= Streetcars in Atlanta =

Aspect of the history of Atlanta, Georgia, USA

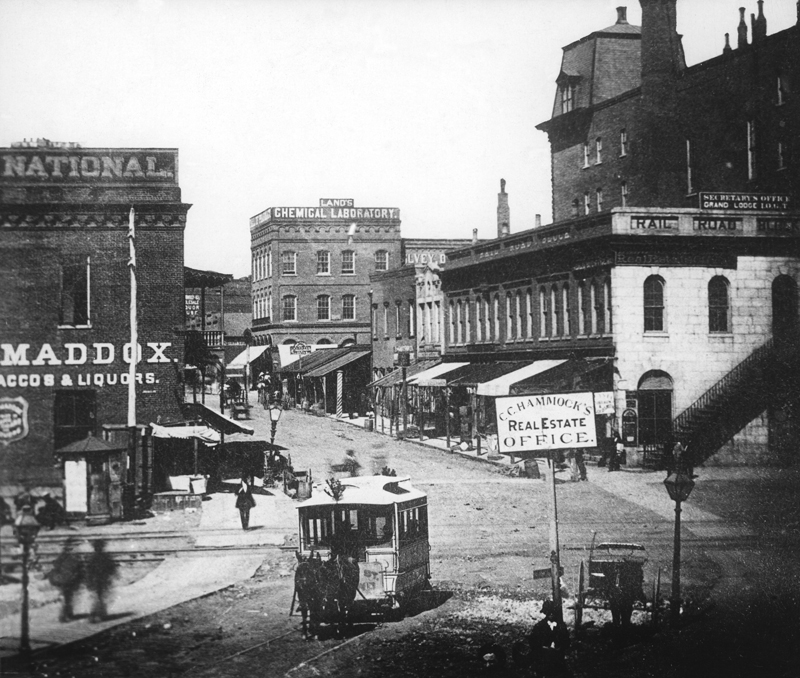
A view of a horsecar on Peachtree Street in 1882

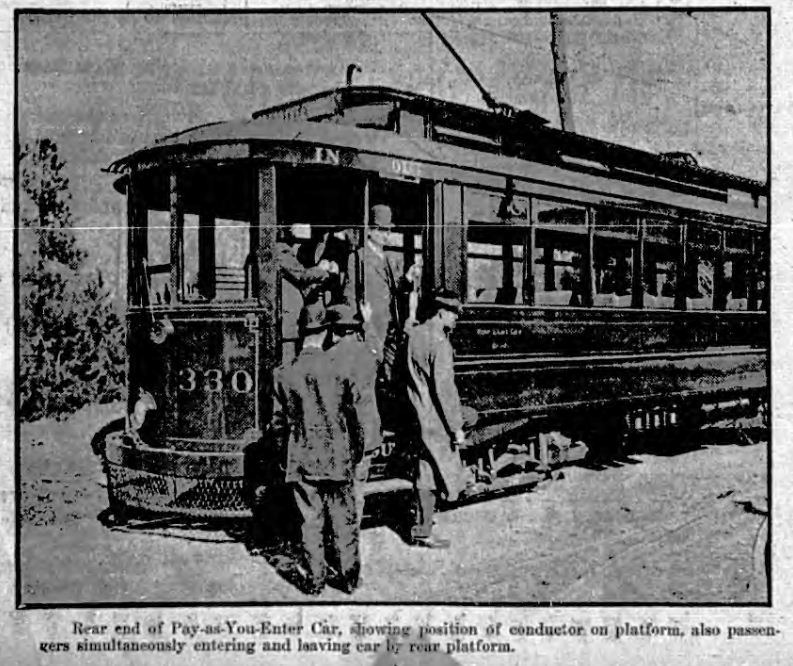
Atlanta streetcar, 1910. Pay-as-you-enter cars were being introduced at the time

Streetcars in Atlanta originally operated between Downtown Atlanta and the surrounding areas from 1871 until the final line's closure in 1949.

The first such transportation began with horsecars in 1871, and electric streetcar service started in the 1880s. In addition to streetcars in Atlanta proper, there were also interurban railways from Atlanta to outlying towns. The last streetcar service on the old network ended in 1949; the streetcar system was quickly replaced by a trolleybus system and with buses.

After decades of planning, construction of a new streetcar system, the Atlanta Streetcar, began in early 2012. Consisting initially of a single route, this new streetcar line opened in December 2014. Planning for a larger network, including on an abandoned loop of intown rail tracks now known as the Beltline is under way.

== Streetcars 1871–1949 ==
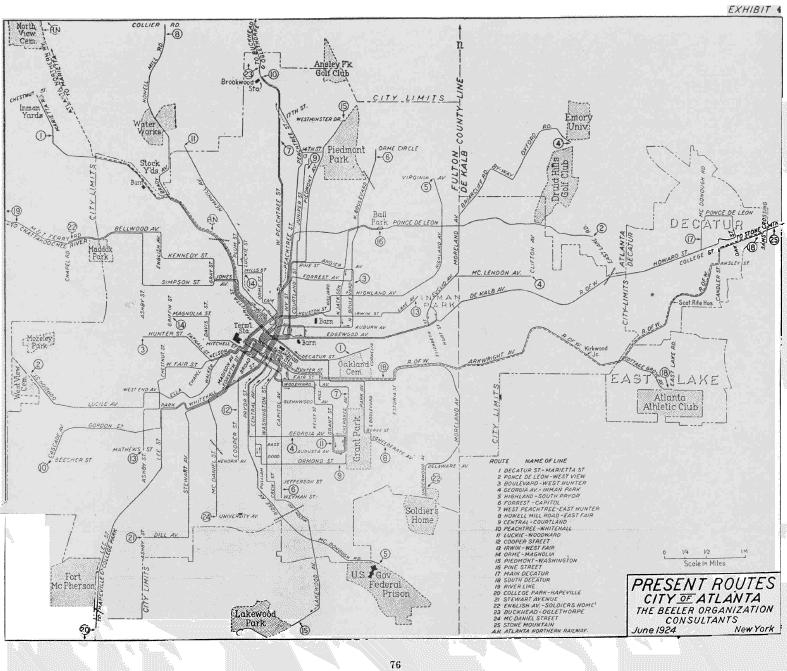
Map of Atlanta's streetcar system in 1924

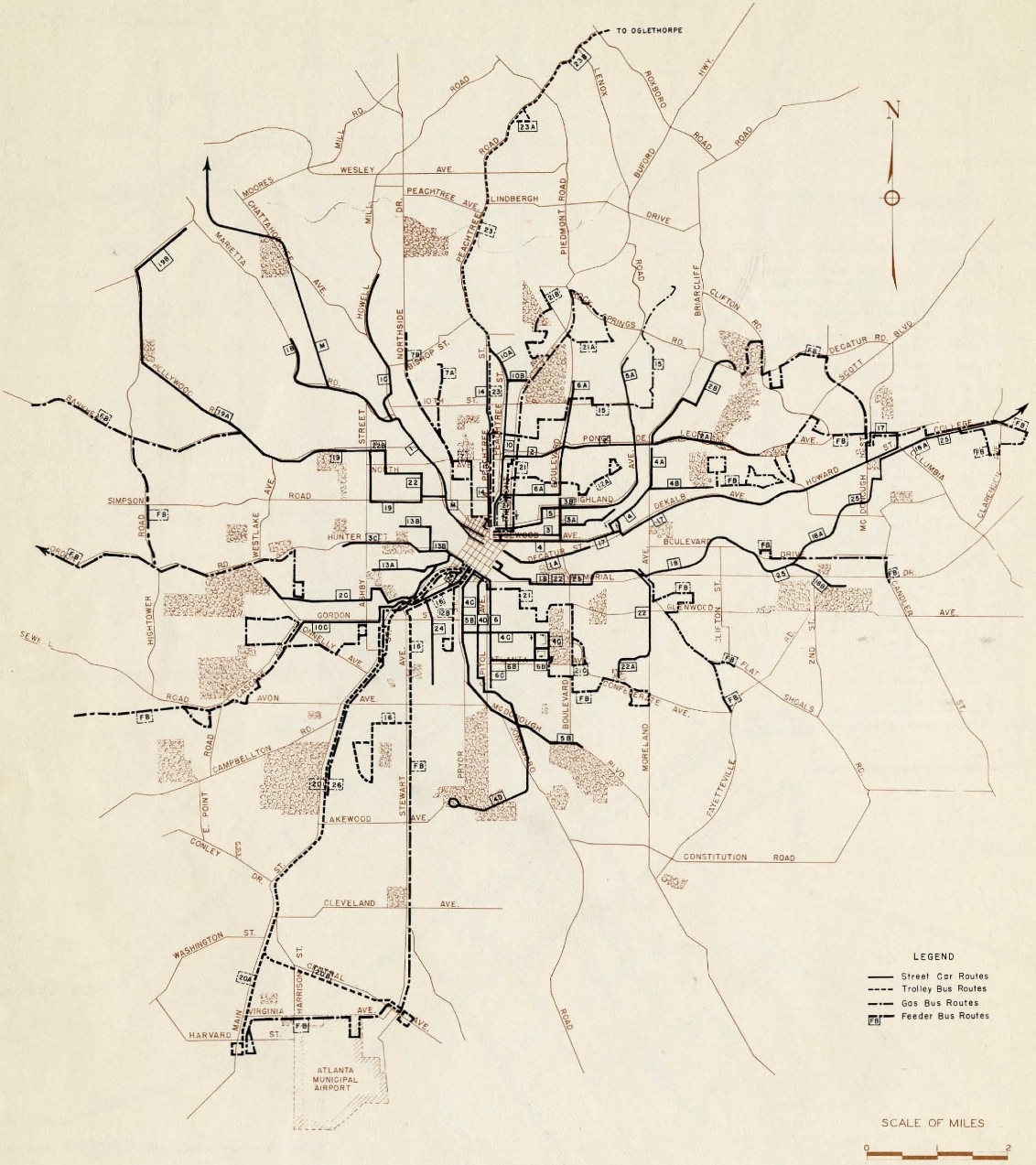
Map of Atlanta's streetcar system and other transit in 1946

=== Timeline and streetcar operators ===
- 1871 Richard Peters and George Adair ran the first streetcars on the Atlanta Street Railway, service to West End
- 1872 West End & Atlanta Street Railroad Co. formed, service to West End and Westview Cemetery
- 1878 Adair sold out to Peters
- 1879 Gate City Street Railroad Co. formed, service to Angier Springs and Ponce de Leon Springs
- 1882 Metropolitan Street Railroad Co. formed, lines to the Confederate Soldiers' Home near Ormewood Park and to Decatur
- 1883 Fulton County Street Railroad Co. formed, lines would include the Nine-Mile Circle
- 1886 Joel Hurt formed the Atlanta & Edgewood Street Railroad Co., service out Edgewood Avenue to Hilliard and Highland and to Inman Park
- 1889 Hurt's streetcar - Atlanta's first electric line - began to run between Five Points and Inman Park and control of Peter's company passed to son Edward C. Peters; Fulton County Street RR Co. began its Nine-Mile Circle line to what is now Virginia Highland, powered by the electric Thomson-Houston system.
- 1890 Atlanta, West End & McPherson Barracks Ry. Co. began, powered by the electric Sprague system
- 1891 Law passed requiring segregation on streetcars "as much as practicable" and at the enforcement of streetcar conductors. Prior to this, it was common for Black and white passengers to sit next to each other on streetcars.
- 1891 (May) Atlanta Consolidated Street Railway Company formed, instigating the Second Battle of Atlanta
- 1892 Atlanta City Street Railway Co. began, powered by the electric Detroit system
- 1902 All street railways consolidated as Georgia Railway and Power Company
- 1916 Atlanta streetcar strike of 1916 began September 30 and ended January of the next year
- 1924 The Beeler Report issued to advise the financially ailing company
- 1926 Peak of passenger service (96,794,273)
- 1937 Trackless trolleys introduced
- 1949 Georgia Power ran its last streetcar (on the River Line to Riverside, leaving only trackless trolleys and buses

=== Routes ===
From 1889–1901, the famed Nine-Mile Circle line ran from Downtown Atlanta to Ponce de Leon Springs and what is now Virginia Highland.

In 1924, Georgia Power operated the following streetcar lines (see map above):

- 1 Decatur St.-Marietta St-Marietta Rd
- 2 Ponce de Leon-West View (east terminus: Ponce at East Lake Rd.)
- 3 Boulevard-West Hunter
- 4 Inman Park-Georgia Ave. (alternative eastern termini: McLendon at Clifton and Emory)
- 5 Highland-South Pryor (north terminus: Virginia Ave. at N. Highland Ave.)
- 6 Forrest-Capitol (Forrest Ave. is now Ralph McGill Blvd.) (north terminus: Boulevard at Orme Cir.)
- 7 West Peachtree-East Hunter
- 8 Howell Mill Road-East Fair
- 10 Peachtree-Whitehall
- 11 Luckie-Woodward
- 12 Copper-Pine
- 13 Irwin-West Fair St.
- 14 Orme St.-Magnolia St.
- 15 Piedmont-Washington
- 16 Pine Street (see route 12) (eastern terminus: Ponce de Leon Park)
- 17 Main Decatur
- 18 South Decatur-East Lake
- 19 River Line
- 20 College Park & Hapeville
- 21 Stewart Ave. (see route 1)
- 22 English Ave.-Soldiers' Home
- 23 Buckhead & Oglethorpe
- 24 McDaniel St.

=== Former interurban lines ===
Georgia Railway and Power Company ran lines on private rights-of-way from Atlanta to:

- Marietta, the 16-mile Atlanta Northern line, from 1905–1947
- Hopewell and Stone Mountain, 16 miles, 1913–1947
- College Park and Fairburn, 19 miles, 1915-1945

== Proposed streetcar lines (21st century) ==
=== Peachtree ===
A much longer route along Peachtree Street, the city's main street. Originally, the line was to run from the Oakland City neighborhood through Downtown Atlanta, Midtown and Buckhead. However a more recent (2010) pared-down proposal would run between the Arts Center MARTA station in Midtown and the Five Points MARTA station downtown.

In 2015, Buckhead business leaders and city councilpersons successfully had the portion of along Peachtree Road, from Piedmont Hospital to Lenox Mall, removed from the long range plan.

=== Beltline routes ===
Streetcar routes that would have been funded by 1-cent sales tax, which was voted down in July 2012

In July 2012, there was a referendum on a 1-cent sales tax (SPLOST) to fund traffic and road improvements. If it had been approved, the tax would have funded several streetcar routes along portions of the Beltline trail and connections onto MARTA stations and with the Downtown Loop streetcar. The final list of projects to have been funded included 2 routes:

- Midtown to Northeast: from North Ave. MARTA station (1) east along North Ave. to the Beltline, then north along Beltline to 10th and Monroe (southeast corner of Piedmont Park) (2) and south to Edgewood St. (3) and connection to the Downtown streetcar at its eastern terminus (which would be extended from it current proposed terminus at Jackson St.)
- Downtown/Midtown to Southwest:
  - branch from North Ave. station to Luckie St. (4)
  - branch from the western terminus of the Downtown streetcar at Centennial Olympic Park/CNN to Luckie St. (4)
  - from Luckie St. (4) along North Avenue, Northside Drive, out Donald L. Hollowell Parkway to the Bankhead neighborhood (5), then south along the Beltline to Abernathy and Cascade in West End/Westview (6).

The earlier proposal in March 2011 included two lines that did not make the final list for the July 2012 vote:

- Bankhead MARTA to Midtown: From Bankhead MARTA station north along the Beltline, then east along 17th St. past Atlantic Station to Arts Center MARTA station
- Armour Yard to Midtown: From Armour Yard (proposed new transit station near I-85/Monroe exit), south along the Beltline, then west along North Ave.

The proposal was defeated in the 10-county Metro Atlanta region, as a region 63% against and 37% for. In Fulton and DeKalb Counties the results were 52% against and 48% for.

=== C-Loop (abandoned concept) ===
In 2005, MARTA analyzed - in addition to the Beltline - the "C-Loop" (C-shaped rail line) linking Emory University, Lindbergh Center, Atlantic Station, Georgia Tech, the Georgia Dome, the AUC, Turner Field, Grant Park, and proceeding eastward along I-20 to South DeKalb Mall. The route originated from the efforts of Reps. John Lewis, Denise Majette and Cynthia McKinney, who obtained funding from the Dept. of Transportation for a $2 million feasibility study. The concept no longer appears in proposals from the various Georgia transportation authorities, however the part of the route is now part of the Clifton Corridor initiative to build either MARTA rail, light rail, and/or bus rapid transit between Lindbergh and Emory and on to Avondale MARTA station.

=== Northern Crescent ===
In June 2011 the Gwinnett, Cobb, and North Fulton Chambers of Commerce held a summit to promote light rail transit in the northern metropolitan area. It was especially remarkable in light of decades-long opposition to rapid transit in the area. Proposed routes (see map) would form a "W" and connect:

- Kennesaw, Marietta and the Cumberland edge city with the Arts Center MARTA Station along I-75
- Alpharetta with the Dunwoody MARTA Station along Georgia 400
- The Suwanee area in Gwinnett with the Doraville MARTA Station
- Doraville, Dunwoody, and the Cumberland area in an arc along the northern Perimeter

== Modern streetcar line ==
The Atlanta Streetcar, also known as the Downtown Loop, opened after three years of construction and 18 month of delays on December 30, 2014.

The route runs 2.7 miles (4.3 km) east-west from Centennial Olympic Park to the Martin Luther King, Jr. National Historic Site, with tracks that converge at Woodruff Park. The line serves 12 stops.

== See also ==
- Nine-Mile Circle streetcar line to Virginia Highland
- Timeline of mass transit in Atlanta
- Trolleybuses in Atlanta
- List of streetcar systems in the United States (all-time list)
