= Timeline of mass transit in Atlanta =

Timeline of mass transit in Atlanta:

- 1871 Richard Peters and George Adair run the first streetcars on the Atlanta Street Railway Company
- 1872 West End & Atlanta Street Railroad Company formed
- 1878 Adair sells out to Peters
- 1879 Gate City Street Railroad Company formed
- 1882 Metropolitan Street Railroad Company formed
- 1883 Fulton County Street Railroad Company formed
- 1886 Joel Hurt forms the Atlanta & Edgewood Street Railroad Co.
- 1889 Hurt's streetcar begins to run between Five Points and Inman Park and control of Peter's company passed to son Edward C. Peters; Fulton County Street RR Co. begins powered by the electric Thomson-Houston system.
- 1890 Atlanta, West End & McPherson Barracks Ry. Co. begins powered by the electric Sprague system
- 1891 (May) Atlanta Consolidated Street Railway Company formed instigating the "Second Battle of Atlanta"
- 1892 Atlanta City Street Railway Co. begins powered by the electric Detroit system
- 1902 All street railways consolidated as Georgia Railway and Power Company
- 1916 Atlanta transit strike of 1916 began at 6pm on Saturday, September 30 and ended that Monday evening, but the strike started after sundown those three days so the city wasn't completely paralyzed
- 1924 The Beeler Report issued to advise the financially ailing company
- 1926 Peak of passenger service (96,794,273)
- 1937 Trolleybuses introduced
- 1949 Georgia Power runs its last streetcar, leaving only trackless trolleys and buses
- 1950 Five week Atlanta transit strike of 1950
- 1950 Control of all transit passed to Atlanta Transit Company (ATC)
- 1959 System officially desegregated
- 1963 Trackless trolleys phased out leaving only buses
- 1965 MARTA formed (March) and Cobb County votes against joining
- 1971 Clayton and Gwinnett counties vote against joining MARTA with 4-1 margins
- 1972 MARTA purchases ATC for $13 million thus assuming control for all public transit
- 1975 Construction begins on MARTA rail system
- 1979 Operation begins on MARTA rail system
- 2000 Most recent MARTA station opens at North Springs, with no funding available for expansion since then
- 2006 (July) all 38 MARTA stations converted to Breeze Card digital fare system
- December 2014 The new Atlanta Streetcar begin service from downtown to the Sweet Auburn district, and Clayton county joins MARTA

== See also ==
- Streetcars in Atlanta
- Trolleybuses in Atlanta
