= City Building =

City Building may refer to:

- City Building (Illinois), a historic Illinois building
- City Building (series), a series of video games published by Sierra
- City-building game, a genre of video games
- City hall, the chief administrative building of a city
- City Building in the New South, a 1983 nonfiction book
