= Atlanta Transit Company =

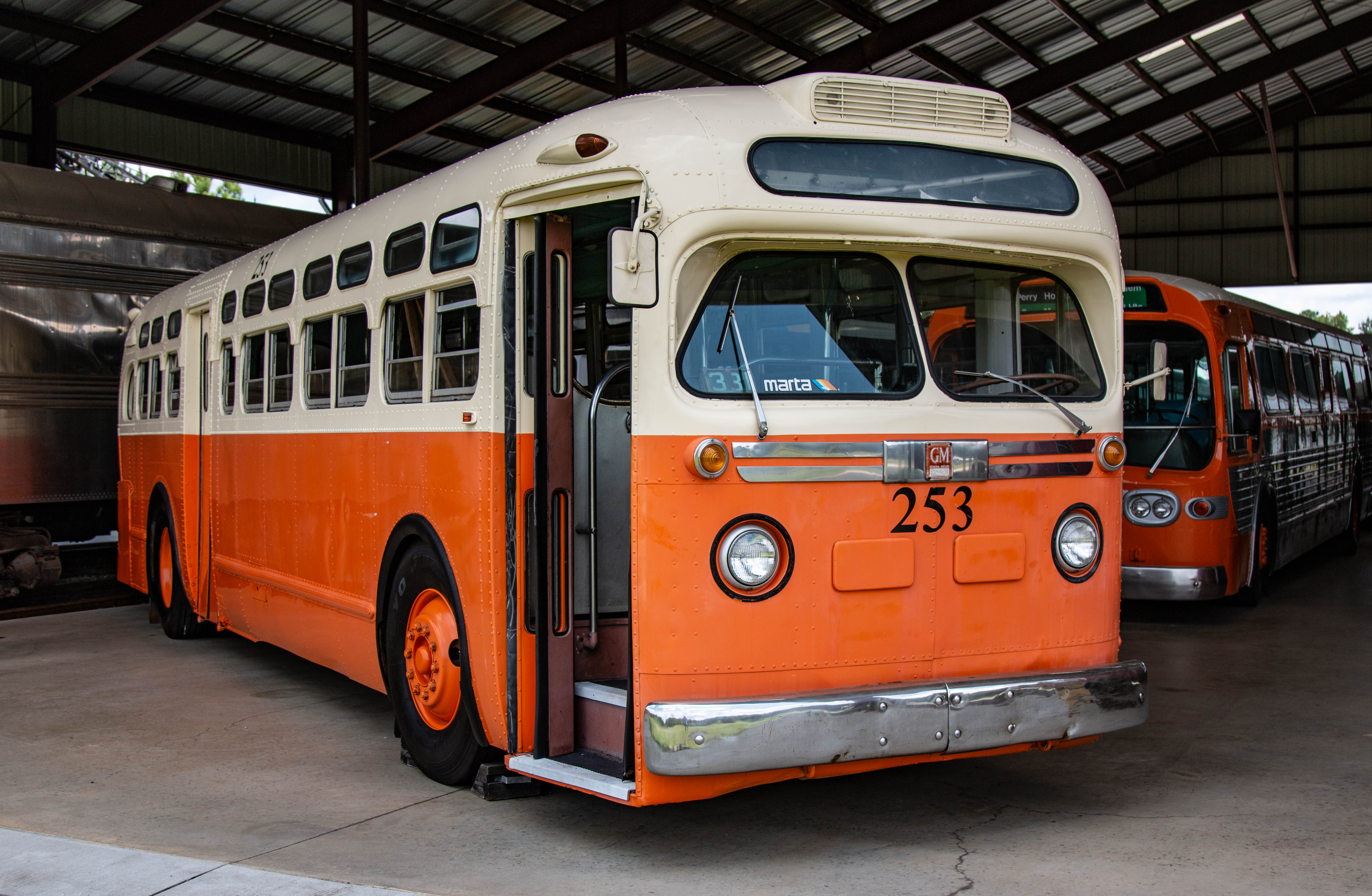
- ATC bus at the Southeastern Railway Museum
- Commenced operation: 1950; 75 years ago
- Ceased operation: 1972; 53 years ago (acquisition by MARTA)
- Locale: Atlanta, Georgia

The Atlanta Transit Company (ATC) was a public transport operator based in Atlanta, Georgia, which existed from 1950 to 1972. It was the immediate predecessor of the Metropolitan Atlanta Rapid Transit Authority (MARTA).

== History ==
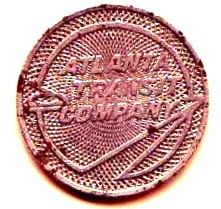
Obverse of Atlanta Transit Company token, with logo.

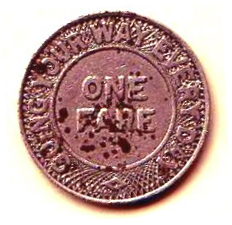
Reverse of Atlanta Transit Company, which says "Going your way every day. One Fare."

Since the 1920s, the Georgia Railway and Power Company (now Georgia Power, a part of Southern Company), had been losing money on transit. It commissioned a study from Beeler in 1926, but the suggestions were not enough to help. In the late-1940s most years saw double-digit percentage losses of ridership: from 125 million in 1946 down to 100 million in 1948 and finally 86 million in 1949.

In April 1949, Georgia Power ran the last streetcar on Atlanta's original network, and in May of the next year its drivers went on strike. During the five-week-long work stoppage, Georgia Power sought for a buyer for its increasingly troubled transit business. In response to this, Atlanta businessmen Clement Evans, Granger Hansell and Inman Brandon, along with Leland Anderson of Columbus, Georgia, formed the ATC and purchased the transportation properties on June 23, 1950, just over a month into the strike. More than 1,300 employees signed on to the new company and ended their strike. Anderson became the president of the ATC, and in September 1950 a Georgia Power vice president, Jackson Dick, joined to become the chairman of the board.

The system consisted of the trolleybus (trackless trolley) system as well as regular (diesel) transit buses. The former was phased out in 1963, allowing the city to remove its overhead wires. The city's drivers and mechanics were part of Amalgamated Street Car Union Local 732. One of the company's promotional drives was called Orchids for Operators, in which customers could nominate a helpful or courteous employee for that honor.

In 1965, the newly formed MARTA began plans for a new rapid transit system. By 1972, when planning was mostly finished, Fulton and DeKalb counties had signed on to the new rail system. As a result, MARTA purchased ATC for US$13 million, making it the sole mass transit entity in the area.

== See also ==
- Streetcars in Atlanta
- Trolleybuses in Atlanta
