= Ponce de Leon Springs (Atlanta) =

Former mineral springs in Atlanta, Georgia

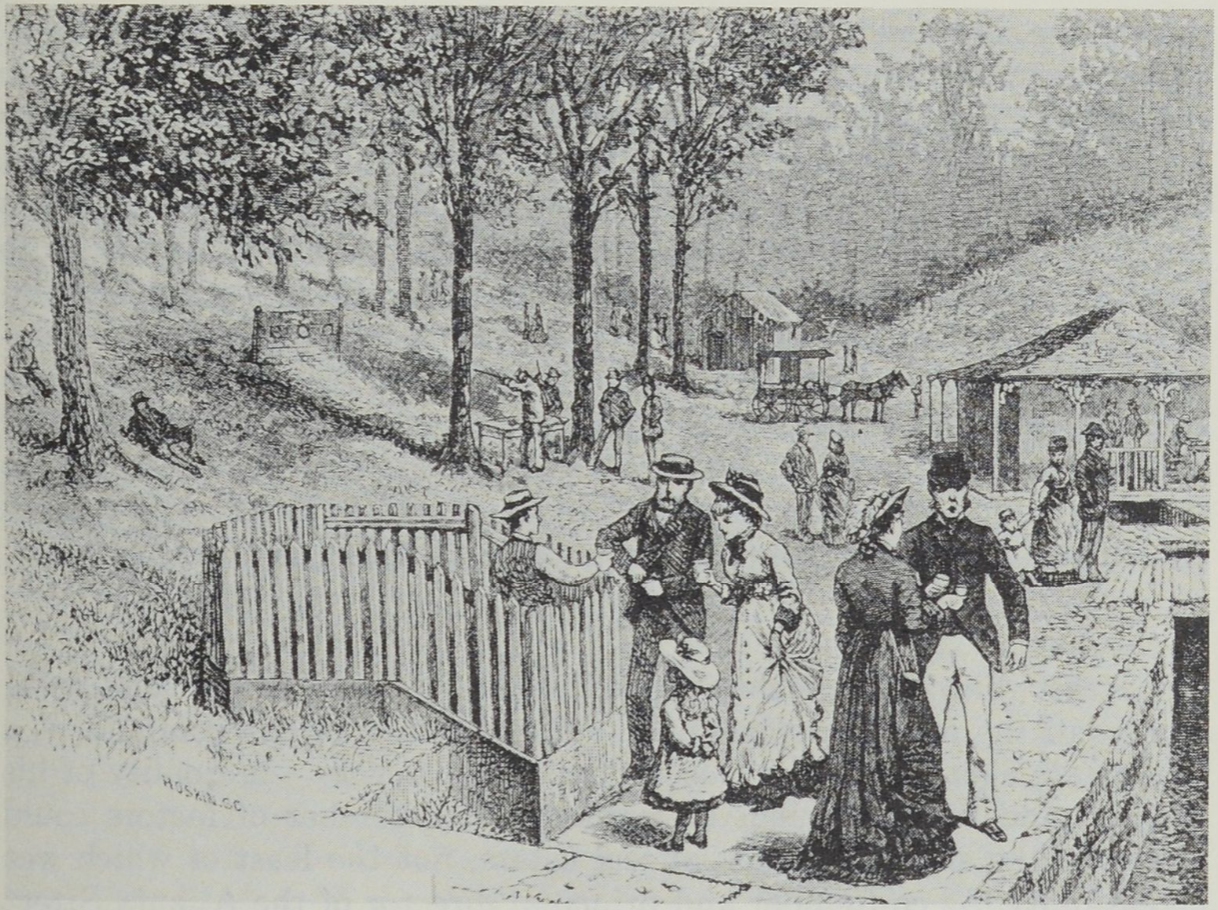
- An engraving of the spring in 1879
- Interactive map of Ponce de Leon Springs
- Type: Mineral spring
- Location: Atlanta, Georgia, United States
- Coordinates: 33°46′20″N 84°22′0″W

Ponce de Leon Springs was a mineral spring in Atlanta, Georgia, in the United States. The spring was a popular tourist destination from the mid-1800s through the early 1900s. Around the turn of the century, the land surrounding the spring was developed into an amusement park. By the 1920s, the amusement park was demolished, and the area was developed for industrial and, later, commercial properties.

Residents of Atlanta had known of the spring, which was located about 2 miles (3.2 km) northeast of downtown Atlanta, since the early 1800s, though it was not until the mid-1800s that they became a popular tourist area as a local destination spa. The mineral content of the water was thought to provide health benefits to drinkers, and the spring was named in reference to the legend of Spanish explorer Juan Ponce de León's search for the Fountain of Youth. By the 1870s, there was a streetcar line extending from downtown to the spring, following a route that would later become Ponce de Leon Avenue, one of the city's busiest thoroughfares. In the early 1900s, the spring was sold to developers who created an amusement park on the site, nicknaming it "the Coney Island of Atlanta". By the 1920s, the amusement park's popularity began to wane and the land was eventually sold to Sears, Roebuck and Co., who built their regional distribution and retail headquarters on the site. Today, the building is Ponce City Market, a mixed-use development, and some of the original land that was home to the spring has been developed into the Historic Fourth Ward Park.

== History ==
=== Early history ===
In the United States in the 1800s, numerous mineral spas were developed around naturally occurring mineral springs. These locations, such as Saratoga Springs in New York and White Sulphur Springs in Virginia, were very popular tourist locations as destination spas, while the mineral water produced at the springs was sought out for its perceived health effects. In the U.S. state of Georgia, there were eleven such mineral springs that had been commercially developed prior to the American Civil War, though many of those resorts were destroyed during that conflict. In Atlanta, Georgia, around the mid-1800s, there were several natural springs that provided the city's residents with fresh drinking water and leisure areas, such as the Atlanta Mineral Spring. Another spring located in the Atlanta metropolitan area was the Ponce de Leon Springs. This spring was located northeast of the city, about 1 mile (1.6 km) outside of the city limits and 2 miles (3.2 km) away from Downtown Atlanta. The area was a low-lying vale where two creeks met, and the spring itself was surrounded by a grove of beech trees. Not far from the area to the southeast was another well-known spring called Angier Spring. People in the area had known of the Ponce de Leon Springs since at least the early 1800s. (Note: Several sources mention that residents of Atlanta had known of the spring since the early 1800s. However, in a 2016 book, Ryan Gravel, one of the founders of the BeltLine in Atlanta, said that railroad workers constructing the Atlanta and Richmond Air-Line Railway in 1871 may have discovered the spring.) Between 1818 and 1820, John Young, a cattle rancher from the area, built a house near the spring, and by the 1830s, the spring was being used as a source of drinking water for some local residents. The water originated from a source rock of gneiss and biotite, with the water being chalybeate. The water was considered medicinal and good for health because of its mineral quality. As a result, in the 1860s, Henry L. Wilson, a retired physician from Atlanta, named the spring the Ponce de Leon Springs as a reference to the legend of Spanish explorer Juan Ponce de León and his search for the Fountain of Youth.

=== Popularity as a trolley park ===
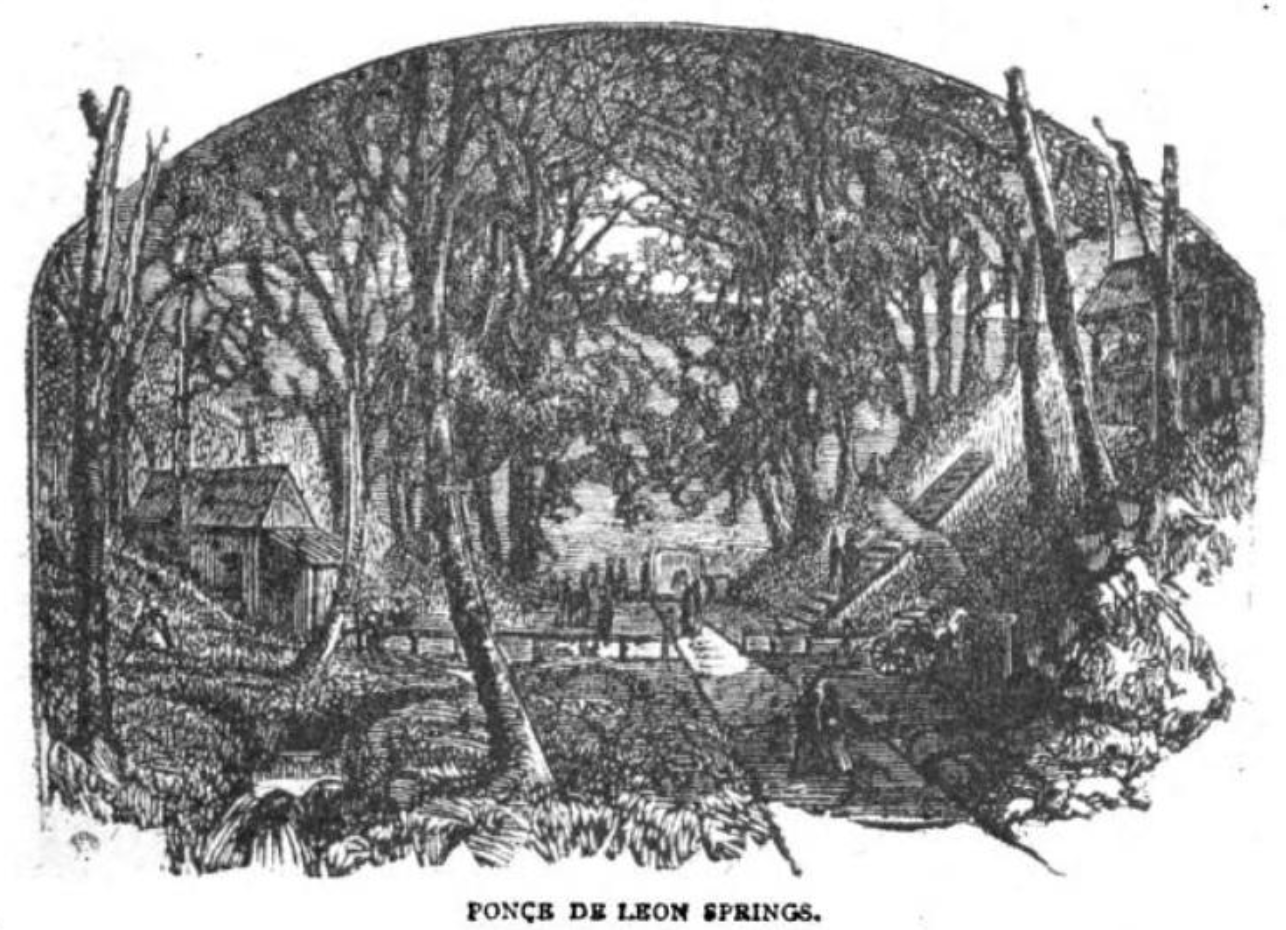
Illustration of the area in 1881

By the 1860s, the spring was under the private ownership of John Armistead. Around this time, the spring started to become a major source of Atlanta's water supply after Yancey Springs, another freshwater spring in the city, had been filled in during 1868 to make way for a new railroad in the city. By 1870, Ponce de Leon Springs had also become a popular day trip destination for Atlanta citizens. With the spring's popularity well-established, Armistead began bottling the water and established a residential water delivery service by 1871. That same year, the Atlanta and Richmond Air-Line Railway constructed a railroad near the spring, which was located at the foot of its embankment. This railroad would later come under the ownership of Southern Railway. In 1872, an amphitheater with a dance pavilion was constructed near the spring, and that same year, a local businessman established a horse-drawn omnibus service to the spring, with a one-way fare of $0.50. The service ran between the spring and Kimball House in downtown and helped to increase tourism to the spring. At the time, it was one of only a handful of public parks in the area, alongside Oglethorpe Park, Oakland Cemetery, and a small park near Atlanta City Hall. Around this same time, Richard Peters, a co-owner of the Atlanta Street Railway, took notice of the increasing popularity of the spring and had a route created to the location. This route, a part of the railway's Nine-Mile Circle, was an extension of their Peachtree Street line and followed a path that would later become known as Ponce de Leon Avenue, one of the most traveled thoroughfares in the city. The line opened in June 1874 and charged a fare of $0.10, which was twice the amount the railway charged for their other routes. This increased price was due to the remote location of the spring, which was in a sparsely populated area, and the line only ran for six months out of the year, as few people visited the spring during the winter. Additionally, the railway had had to construct a bridge across Clear Creek to reach the spring. By 1884, another rail company, the Gate City Street Railroad, had also established a line to take people from downtown to the spring. In 1875, an article in The Atlanta Constitution called the spring "Atlanta's Charming Suburban Resort". By this time, a bath house had also been built at the spring, and there were numerous vendors selling fruit and ice cream to the visitors. A ten-pin bowling alley was added by 1879, the same year that the spring was discussed in the national publication Harper's New Monthly Magazine, and by 1881, the spring was receiving several thousand visitors annually. The popularity of the spring during this time was part of a larger nationwide trend of trolley parks that had become popular in large cities throughout the United States.

=== Purchase by the Atlanta Street Railway ===
In May 1886, Armistead, who still owned the land, began to charge visitors $0.05 to drink water from the spring. Armistead's decision was met with resistance from the Atlanta Street Railway, whose management worried that customer frustration over the charge could hurt their business. However, the following year, the railway purchased the land from Armistead. In January 1888, the railway leased the land to N. C. Bosche, a local businessman who planned to convert the area into a beer garden, though this plan never came to fruition. Two years later, in 1890, W. A. Hemphill, the president of the railway, hired Julius Hartman, a local landscape designer, to renovate the area. Hartman had previously worked on developing Little Switzerland, an amusement park near Grant Park that would later be known as the White City. Hartman proposed enhancing the natural beauty of the area by adding walking paths and by creating a 4-acre (1.6 ha) large artificial lake called Ponce de Leon Lake. This lake, as well as a smaller pond called Pairs Pond, were created in mid-1890. Around the same time that the railway company had purchased the land, African Americans began to be denied entry to the area. Throughout the early 1880s and before, the parkland had previously been open to both African Americans and white Americans, though they were required to use separate venues while at the park. However, by 1887, black people who were taking the streetcar to the spring were told by police that they would not be allowed to enter the land.

=== Amusement park ===
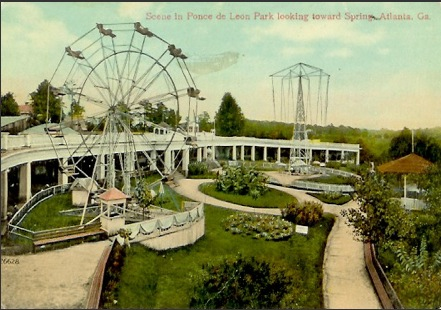
The amusement park, c. early 20th century

In January 1903, 47 acres (19 ha) of land surrounding the spring was purchased by a company that would eventually be known as the Ponce de Leon Amusement Company, which intended to develop the land as an amusement park. Construction began the following month and saw the creation of several new buildings, a theater, a carousel, and a casino. The owners also brought in many other amusement rides and attractions similar to those found at the resort areas of Coney Island, New York, and Atlantic City, New Jersey, such as a ping pong parlor, a gravity railroad, a Ferris wheel, and a penny arcade, among others. The new area soon became known as "the Coney Island of Atlanta". The park was scheduled to open for its inaugural season in May 1903, but this opening was postponed by about a month. The casino opened on June 1 with a performance of The Lady Slavey operetta, and the park as a whole opened to several thousand visitors several days later on June 6. Like with the spring area before it, this amusement park enforced a policy of racial segregation, only allowing African Americans entry if they were servants for white guests. In 1906, the park was purchased by the Ponce de Leon Park Association, which was run by casino lessee Jack Wells as president, Joseph Whitehead as treasurer, and Hugh L. Cardoza as secretary and manager. The association invested $50,000 into renovations for the park (equivalent to $1,791,667 in 2025), which added new attractions and ushered in the park's heyday. In 1907, the lake was filled in and a ballpark, Ponce de Leon Park, was built on the location. This ballpark served as the home venue for the Atlanta Crackers, the city's Minor League Baseball team, who debuted at the park on May 23 of that year before 8,000 spectators. The ballpark would later also serve as the home venue for the Atlanta Black Crackers, the city's Negro league baseball team.

=== Later land use ===
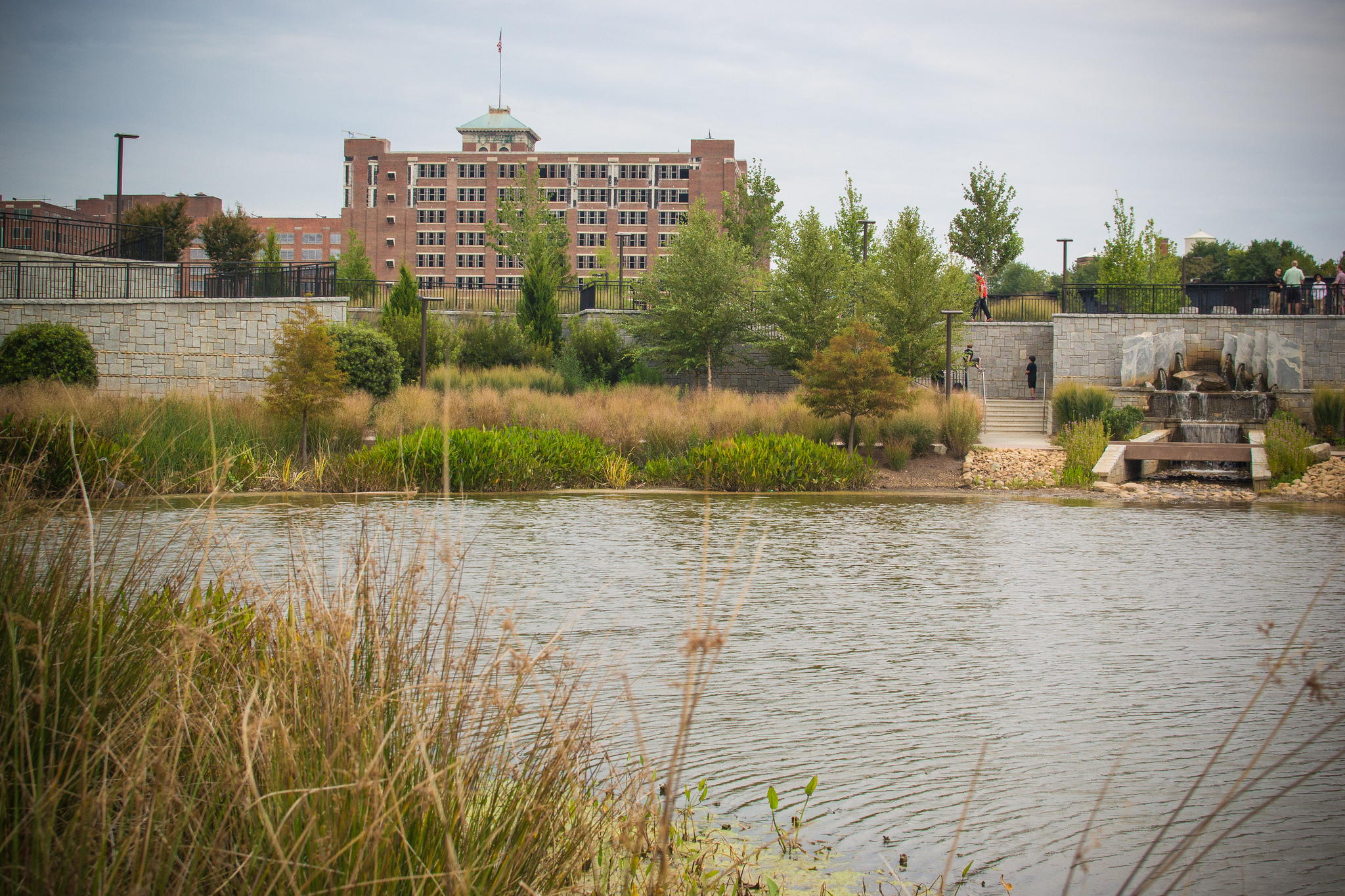
Historic Fourth Ward Park with Ponce City Market in the background, 2012

While the spring and accompanying amusement park remained a popular retreat throughout the early 1900s, by the 1910s, the area around the spring began to see substantial development. In 1914, the Ford Motor Company built a headquarters for their operations in the southeastern United States near the spring. This building served as a factory, showroom, and office for the company until they sold the building to the United States Department of War in 1942. By the early 1920s, the amusement park had fallen out of fashion and, in 1924, Sears, Roebuck and Co. purchased the land that contained the spring and the amusement park in order to construct their new retail and distribution headquarters for the southeast. In 1966, following the construction of Atlanta Stadium, the ballpark was demolished. Following its demolition, the area was converted into commercial real estate and is currently home to Midtown Place, an outdoor shopping mall. In 1990, Sears sold this building to the government of Atlanta, which operated the building for several years as "City Hall East". In 2011, the building was sold by the city to developers who converted it into a mixed-use development called Ponce City Market. Additionally, as of 2016, the Ford building has been converted into an apartment complex called the Ford Factory Lofts. Also in the 2000s, a significant amount of land just south of Ponce City Market in what had previously been the spring area was converted into the Historic Fourth Ward Park, while the railroad right of way that ran next to the spring area has undergone redevelopment as part of the BeltLine, a series of shared-use paths and urban green spaces that surround the city.

== See also ==
- List of springs

== Sources ==
- "Everything you need to know about Ponce City Market". The Atlanta Journal-Constitution. Cox Enterprises. January 9, 2020. ISSN 1539-7459. Archived from the original on May 30, 2022.
- Clarke, E. Y. (1881). Atlanta Illustrated (3rd ed.). Atlanta: J. P. Harrison.
- Davis, Ren; Davis, Helen (2012). Atlanta's Oakland Cemetery: An Illustrated History and Guide. Introduction by Timothy J. Crimmins. Athens, Georgia: University of Georgia Press. ISBN 978-0-8203-4313-6.
- Garrett, Franklin M. (Spring 1981). "A Short History of Land Lot 49 of the Fourteenth District of Originally Henry, now Fulton County in Georgia". Atlanta Historical Journal. XXV (1). Atlanta Historical Society: 17–40.
- Grant, Donald L. (1993). The Way it was in the South: The Black Experience in Georgia. Edited with a foreword by Jonathan Grant. Athens, Georgia: University of Georgia Press. ISBN 978-0-8203-2329-9.
- Gravel, Ryan (2016). Where We Want to Live: Reclaiming Infrastructure for a New Generation of Cities. New York City: St. Martin's Press. ISBN 978-1-4668-9053-4.
- "The City of Atlanta". Harper's New Monthly Magazine. LX (CCCLV): 30–43. December 1879.
- Herrick, S. M.; LeGrand, H. E. (1949). Geology and Ground-Water Resources of the Atlanta Area, Georgia. The Geological Survey: Bulletin Number 55. Atlanta: Georgia State Division of Conservation Department of Mines, Mining and Geology.
- Irvine, William Stafford (April 1938). "Terminus and Deanville". Atlanta Historical Bulletin. III (13). Atlanta Historical Society: 101–119.
- Janes, Thomas P., ed. (1876). Hand-Book of the State of Georgia: Accompanied by a Geological Map of the State (2nd ed.). Atlanta: Georgia Department of Agriculture.
- Johnson, Adam C. (March 31, 2020). "Solved: The case of Midtown's missing, historic magnolias marker". Curbed Atlanta. Vox Media. Archived from the original on June 2, 2022.
- Johnston, Andy (May 23, 2016). "Ponce lofts were once Ford plant". The Atlanta Journal-Constitution. Cox Enterprises. ISSN 1539-7459. Archived from the original on October 20, 2020.
- King, Augusta Wylie (October 1939). "Atlanta's First Car Barn (1874)". Atlanta Historical Bulletin. IV (19). Atlanta Historical Society: 252–255.
- Klima, Don L. (Summer–Fall 1982). "Breaking Out: Streetcars and Suburban Development, 1872–1900". Atlanta Historical Journal. XXVI (2–3). Atlanta Historical Society: 67–82.
- MacDougald, Louise Black (April 1940). "A Trip Down Peachtree Street in 1886". Atlanta Historical Bulletin. V (21). Atlanta Historical Society: 134–145.
- McMahon, Doreen (October 1944). "Pleasure Spots in Old Atlanta". Atlanta Historical Bulletin. VII (29). Atlanta Historical Society: 220–234.
- Mixer, Adam (October 1906). "A Yankee Druggist in Dixie". The Spatula. XIII (1). Boston: 7–8.
- Partridge, Croom (October 1951). "Remember? or Atlanta During the Spanish–American War". Atlanta Historical Bulletin. IX (35). Atlanta Historical Society: 39–64.
- Peale, Albert C. (1886). Lists and Analyses of the Mineral Springs of the United States [A Preliminary Study]. Bulletin of the United States Geological Survey, No. 32. United States Department of the Interior. Washington, D.C.: United States Government Printing Office.
- Rabinowitz, Howard N. (1994). "From Exclusion to Segregation: Southern Race Relations, 1865–1890". Race, Ethnicity, and Urbanization: Selected Essays. Columbia, Missouri: University of Missouri Press. pp. 137–164. ISBN 978-0-8262-0930-6.
- Toton, Sarah (January 15, 2008). "Vale of Amusements: Modernity, Technology, and Atlanta's Ponce de Leon Park, 1870–1920". Southern Spaces. Archived from the original on February 20, 2022.
- Williamson, June; Dunham-Jones, Ellen (2021). Case Studies in Retrofitting Suburbia: Urban Design Strategies for Urgent Challenges. Hoboken, New Jersey: John Wiley & Sons. ISBN 978-1-119-14919-4.
- Wright, Wade Hampton (July 1938). "Georgia Power Company". Atlanta Historical Bulletin. III (14). Atlanta Historical Society: 195–217.
- Zaring, Russell A. (Fall 1987). "Cascade Springs: An Atlanta Urban Spa". Atlanta History: A Journal of Georgia and the South. XXXI (3). Atlanta Historical Society: 42–56.
