= List of springs =

This is a list of springs.

== Asia ==
- Baotu Spring, Jinan, Shandong, China ("City of Springs")
- Duenmang Tshachu, Bhutan
- Gihon Spring, Jerusalem
- Wolmyeongdong Spring, South Korea
- Al-Hasa Springs, Saudi Arabia
- Beitou District, Taiwan
- Su'ao Cold Spring, Yilan, Taiwan

== Europe ==
- Vrelo Bosne, Ilidža, Bosnia
- Farmakas, Troodos Mountains, Cyprus
- Bath, England
- Buxton, England
- Harrogate, England
- Kiikunlähde, Hollola, Finland
- Fontaine de Vaucluse, France
- 20-Pipe Well, Altleiningen, Germany
- Aachtopf, Germany
- Sachsenbrunnen, Bad Harzburg, Germany
- Castalian Spring, Delphi, Greece
- Pierian Spring, Pieria, Greece
- Spring of Juturna, Roman Forum, Rome, Italy
- Afyonkarahisar, Turkey
- Termal, Yalova, Turkey

== North America ==
- Ice River Spring, Nunavut, Canada
- Bagby Hot Springs, Oregon
- Barton Springs, Texas
- Berkeley Springs, West Virginia
- Bennett Spring, Missouri
- Big Spring, Texas
- Big Spring, Missouri
- Big Springs, Idaho
- Blue Spring, Florida
- Comal Springs, Texas
- Crow Seep, Utah
- Giant Springs, Montana
- Grand Prismatic Spring, Wyoming
- Greer Spring, Missouri
- Homosassa Springs, Florida
- Hot Springs, Virginia
- Mammoth Spring, Arkansas
- Maramec Spring, Missouri
- Montezuma Well, Arizona
- Niagara Springs, Idaho
- Poland Spring, Maine
- Ponce de Leon Springs, Georgia
- Kitch-iti-kipi, Michigan
- Las Estacas, Morelos
- Little Salt Spring, Florida
- Radium Hot Springs, British Columbia
- Rainbow Springs, Florida
- San Marcos Springs, Texas
- Sanlando Springs, Florida
- Saratoga Springs, New York
- Silver Springs, Florida
- Sparkling Springs, Virginia
- Tide Spring, Virginia
- Wakulla Springs, Florida
- Warm Springs, Georgia
- Warm Springs, Virginia
- Wekiwa Springs, Florida
- Weeki Wachee Springs, Florida

== Oceania ==
- Hanmer Springs, Canterbury, New Zealand
- Hot Water Beach, Waikato, New Zealand
- Innot Hot Springs, Queensland, Australia
- Paeroa, Waikato, New Zealand
- Te Waikoropupu Springs, Tasman, New Zealand
- Tjuwaliyn (Douglas) Hot Springs, Northern Territory, Australia

== South America ==
- Cacheuta Spa, Argentina
- Puritama Hot Springs, Chile
- Puyehue Hot Springs, Chile
- São Lourenço, Minas Gerais, Brazil
