= Roosna-Alliku Landscape Conservation Area =

Protected area in Estonia

- Location within Estonia
- Location: Estonia
- Coordinates: 59°01′40″N 25°42′00″E
- Area: 0.43 km^{2} (0.17 sq mi)
- Established: 1981 (2005)

Roosna-Alliku Landscape Conservation Area is a nature park which is located in Järva County, Estonia.

The area of the nature park is 0.43 km^{2}.

The protected area was founded in 1981 to protect Roosna-Alliku Springs. In 2005, the protected area was designated to the landscape conservation area.
