= Beeler =

Beeler is a surname. Notable people with the surname include: Swiss Origin: In Switzerland, “Beeler” can be variant of “Bühler” a surname derived from the German word “Bühle” meaning “hill” or “mound”.

- De E. Beeler (1915–2007), American aerospace engineer
- Jodie Beeler (1921–2002), American baseball player
- Joe Beeler (1931–2006), American illustrator, artist and sculptor
- Kathleen Beeler, American cinematographer
- Rolf Beeler, Swiss affineur
- Selby Beeler, American children's writer
