= Charles Thomas Swift =

American businessman

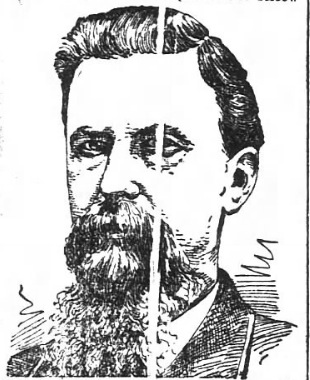
Charles Thomas Swift

Charles Thomas Swift (December 10, 1846 in Morgan County, Georgia – December 30, 1890 in Atlanta) was a prominent Atlanta businessman who became rich marketing the S.S.S tonic, still in production today by S.S.S. Company. The tonic was reportedly an "old [American] Indian remedy for blood poison".

In 1879, he founded S.S.S as a partnership with Henry J. Lamar of Macon, Georgia and Jesse W. Rankin, a co-founder of the Metropolitan Street Railroad horsecars in Atlanta. The company became one of the wealthiest patent medicine concerns in the country, and S. S. S. had been introduced into every "nook and corner" of the US.

His mansion at the 215 Capitol Avenue (NW corner of Crumley Street) in the then-affluent Washington-Rawson neighborhood was later used as the Piedmont Sanitorium, which would become Piedmont Hospital. The Washington-Rawson neighborhood was razed in the early 1960s to make way for Atlanta–Fulton County Stadium and its parking lots; now the site is part of the large Turner Field parking lot.
