= Fulton County Street Railroad =

Defunct streetcar company in Atlanta, United States

The Fulton County Street Railroad Company of Atlanta, Georgia was organized in 1883 by:

- James W. English, businessman and once mayor of Atlanta
- J. Henry Porter, who was once a city councilman
- William T. Newman, Confederate war hero, U.S. district judge and city attorney; father of writer Frances Newman
- William A. Hemphill, who was once mayor
- Dr. Henry Lumpkin Wilson, physician and city councilman who was active in the city's expansion and development
- Maj. William D. Luckie, "prominent secret order man" and cashier of the Merchant's Bank
- Robert A. Bacon, secretary of the railroad commission
- David C. Black, and
- Augustus Shaw, "well-known railroad man and veteran of the Confederacy"

The first lines authorized were to go from the Union Station to what is now Midtown Atlanta along West Peachtree St. and Jackson St.

The primary route became the Nine-Mile Circle which was intended to develop the newly subdivided neighborhood of Copenhill, where the Carter Center now stands.

It was merged into the Atlanta Consolidated Street Railway in 1891.

The trolley barns on 5 acres (2.0 ha) on Virginia Avenue on the east side of the BeltLine (today's Virginia Highland Apartments), remained in service into the 20th century, servicing city buses until 1977. In 1988, the trolley barns were torn down despite the City Council and Virginia Highland Civic Associations's attempts to save them. Although previously assuring local residents that he avowed saving the historic structures, Mayor Andrew Young then vetoed the resolution, and the Council's vote of 11–3 was not enough to override it. Young cited the discovery of asbestos in the buildings and other hazardous materials on the property.

== See also ==
- Streetcars in Atlanta
- Timeline of mass transit in Atlanta
