= Jesse W. Rankin =

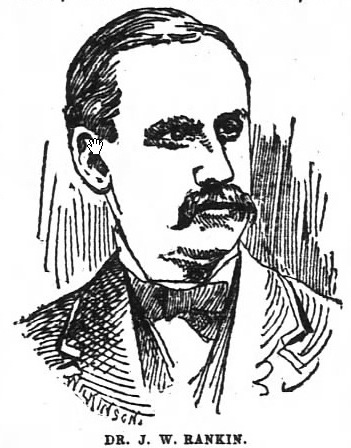
Dr. Jesse W. Rankin

Jesse Willis Rankin (1839 near Tallahassee, Florida – February 25, 1892, in Atlanta) was a leading Atlanta businessman of the 19th century. He cofounded the S. S. S. Company along with Charles T. Swift, which would become at one point the country's largest patent medicine company (its namesake "S. S. S. Tonic" is still in production). He also cofounded (and, for a time, led) the Metropolitan Street Railroad. The Metropolitan Street Railroad brought horsecar (and, later, electric streetcar) lines to the Washington-Rawson and Grant Park neighborhoods and to Clark Atlanta University.
