= City Building in the New South =

History book about Houston, Texas

City Building in the New South: The Growth of Public Services in Houston, Texas, 1830-1910
- Author: Harold L. Platt
- Language: English
- Genre: Non-fiction
- Publisher: Temple University Press
- Publication date: 1983
- Publication place: United States

City Building in the New South: The Growth of Public Services in Houston, Texas, 1830-1910 is a 1983 non-fiction book by Harold L. Platt, published by Temple University Press.

It is the second book of the publisher's "Technology and Urban Growth" series, which debuted in 1980. William H. Wilson of North Texas State University (now University of North Texas) wrote that the audience would be narrow, mostly people interested in the fields of the history of Texas and the history of urban areas. Wilson identified the main themes as the increasing international interconnectivity in utilities and how it related to the city's growth, the involvement of politics and urban development in utilities, and how the South continued to have a regional identity and special development even though the United States itself was becoming more intra-connected.

Dr. Robert Fisher, a University of Houston associate professor of history, quoted in a document in a U.S. Congressional report, stated that the book "carefully documents" a conflict between those who wanted more social services and those who wanted fewer, with the latter party being victorious and representing wealthy interests. Instead the wealthier interests wished to use infrastructure to get funding from entities in the Northern United States. The pro-social services types wanted equality between citizens. Electrical and waste management services are focuses of this work. Barry J. Kaplan of Houston wrote in the Pacific Historical Review wrote that the secondary conflict was between professionals and non-professionals but "For in the mid-nineteenth century the dividing line between the two was quite tenuous."

Carl Abbott of Portland State University wrote that the content is balanced according to the conflict in the political sphere and the activity in the city government. He also wrote that the coverage multiple generations of policy instead of a single one "shows the essential continuity between the ambitions and actions of Houston's commercial-civic elite in the 1840s and 1850s and their program for the metropolis of the twentieth century." Abbott noted that the book uses a different definition of "city planning", referring to the political process, from what is customarily used, regarding specifically land use.

== Contents ==
The initial section, "City Building by Amateurs", discusses the establishment of infrastructure up until the 1880s, while the latter one, "Urban Planning by Experts", happened afterward and with actual experts as cities could no longer work with amateur implementation.

== Reception ==
Abbott concluded that it was a "commendable study" that met standards for proper research. Abbott argued that the municipal politicians were not removed from effects elsewhere in the country like the book implied and that "the book does not clearly describe the actual neighborhood service effect" from politics.

Timothy J. Crimmins of Georgia State University wrote that the book had a "clear and concise narrative" and that its interdisciplinary focus is the primary "strength"; other previous works had individually studied the relevant aspects. He wrote that while Houston's relative size and economic strength was not relevant to the book's content itself, he stated the book makes Houston's economic strength sound more significant than it was, as it had fewer than 25,000 residents circa 1860-1890.

David R. Goldfield of University of North Carolina, Charlotte gave the book a positive review, stating "Platt has established a solid standard for research" in the field. Goldfield praised the "impressive" "command of the sources and data" while he criticized the lack of biographical data which would explain the divergence of the political factions. Goldfield also stated "I question that the metropolitans possessed a "holistic perception of the city.""

Kaplan wrote that the author "has done an excellent job of reconstructing pre-twentieth century Houston", and that the work is "well researched and detailed".

Martin V. Melosi of Texas A&M University wrote that the author did an "important task" as there had been little research in the field beforehand and that "More books like City Building in the New South need to be written."

Howard N. Rabinowitz of the University of New Mexico praised the book's "thorough and imaginative approach" and concluded it is a "valuable source" for those interested in the field. He criticized how the book attributes too much of the conflict to "neighborhood interests" instead of "other factors such as race, class, or patronage", how the book does not have "analysis of the political factions that allegedly divided over public policy options" and how the author labeled too many people as "reformers" without specifying who the "conservatives" are.

Jeffrey K. Stine, Congressional Fellow of the American Historical Association, stated the book is "thoroughly researched and well reasoned", and he praised how the book discussed "economic, legal, and political contexts" of technological development, "a task too frequently shunned by historians of technology." He criticized how the book did not "treat technology and/or its effect on the city as its primary concern".

Wilson stated that the book is "a provocative analysis of Houston's growth" and that "There is much else in this book to commend it". He stated that the scope is narrower than what the title implies and that the prose is sometimes "heavy".
