= Riverside, Atlanta =

Neighborhood of Atlanta, Georgia

Coordinates: 33.813°N 84.472°W

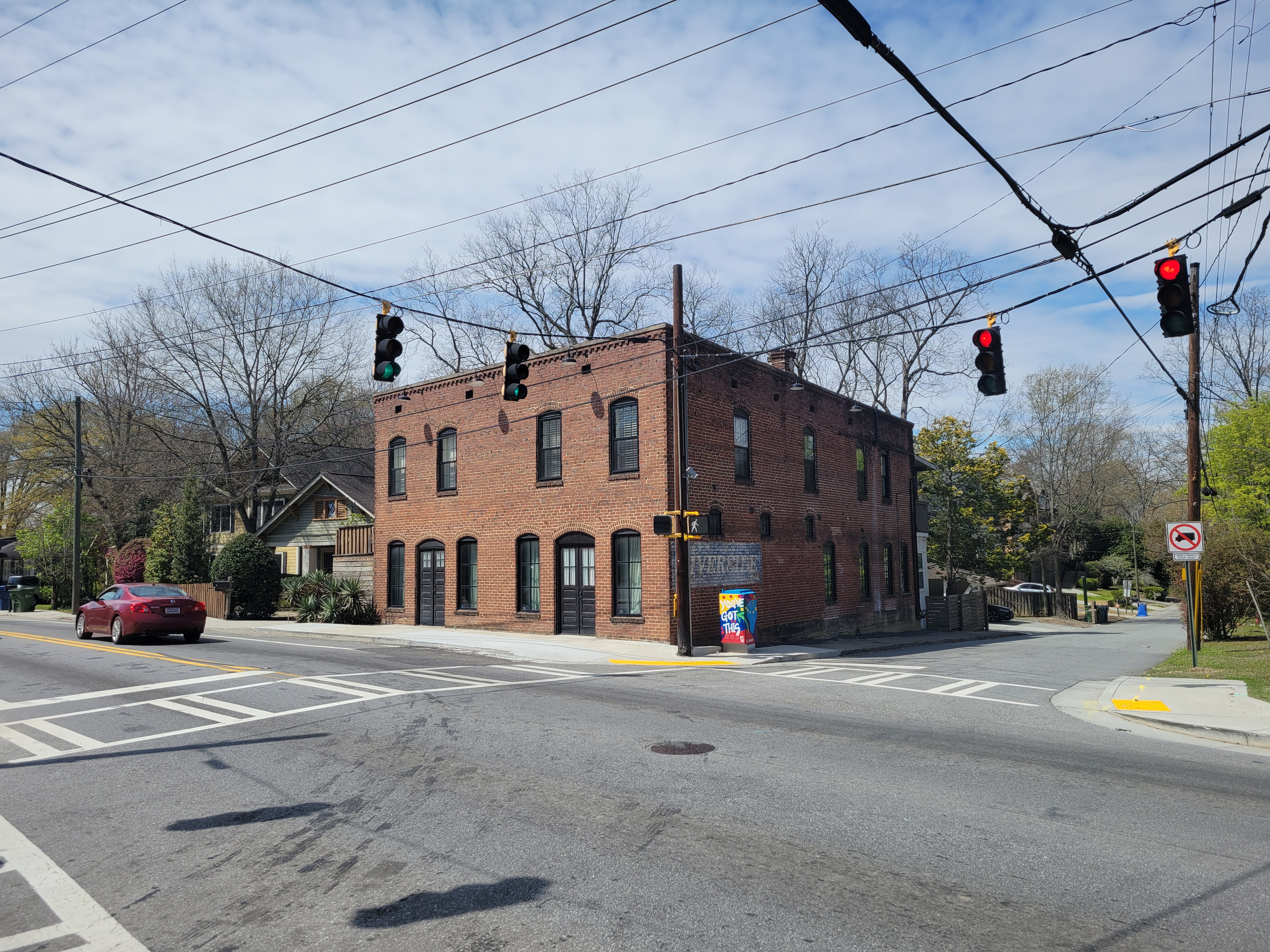
Corner of Bolton Road and Main Street

Riverside is an intown neighborhood located on the Upper Westside of Atlanta. It is so named because it is situated along the Chattahoochee River.

== Geography ==
Riverside is bordered by the Chattahoochee River to the north, Jackson Parkway to the west, Southern Railway train tracks to the south and Paul Avenue to the east. Bolton Road is the main arterial street that runs through the neighborhood and at the intersection with Main Street is a small village center with a restaurant, car dealership, antique stores and a variety of places to shop. The racial make up of the neighborhood as of the 2010 census is 90.1% white, 3.6% black or African American, 4.1% Spanish or Latino, 0.2% Native American or Hawaiian, 1.1% Asian, 4.6% mixed races. The neighborhood is encompassed in the 30318 zip code.

== History ==
The area that is now known as Riverside started as a working plantation, known as the Spink Estate after its owner, James W. Spink. Spink sold the first lots, which are now occupied by the residence and carriage house at the intersection of Spink Street and Hollywood Road, for the start of this new community in 1892. An article in the Atlanta Constitution dated June 9, 1892 was titled “Atlanta on the Chattahoochee – The City Has Gone Clear To the River – The Sale at Riverside.” One of the main streets of the neighborhood is named Spink Street. Spink died suddenly in 1906 and Spink’s widow, Elizabeth, continued to live in Riverside until her death in 1910. In 1914, the remainder of the Spink Estate was sold as 300 lots and 20 small farms. In time, the farms gave way to more houses. Riverside was annexed into the city of Atlanta in 1952. Today, Riverside is a prosperous community.

== Streetcar ==
The River Line was an Atlanta streetcar line that ran from 1892 to 1949. The line ran out Bellwood Ave. (now Donald Lee Hollowell Pkwy.) to Almond Park and then on to the Riverside community. The line ceased operation in 1949 with the last ride to Riverside.

== Education ==
Riverside, like all areas of the City of Atlanta, is part of the Atlanta Public Schools district. It is served by Bolton Academy (Elementary), Sutton Middle School, and North Atlanta High School.

== Sources ==
- https://www.niche.com/places-to-live/n/riverside-atlanta-ga/
