= List of springs of Estonia =

This is list of springs of Estonia. The list is incomplete.

Name in Estonian	Name in English	Location (county, parish)	Daily discharge (during high water)	Further info	Image	Coordinates
Aegviidu Siniallikad	Aegviidu Bluesprings	Lääne-Viru County, Tapa Parish				
Aravete allikad	Aravete Springs	Järva County, Järva Parish				
Müräläte	Kõõru sacrificial spring	Võru County, Setomaa Parish				57°50′8″N 27°26′39″E
Pähkla allikas	Pähkla spring	Saare County, Saaremaa Parish				
Roosna-Alliku allikad						
Salajõe allikad	Salajõe springs	Lääne County, Lääne-Nigula Parish				
Tuhala nõiakaev	Tuhala Witch's Well	Harju County, Kose Parish				

== See also ==
- List of springs
