= Westview, Atlanta =

Coordinates: 33°44′23″N 84°26′23″W

Westview, Atlanta, Georgia
- CDP
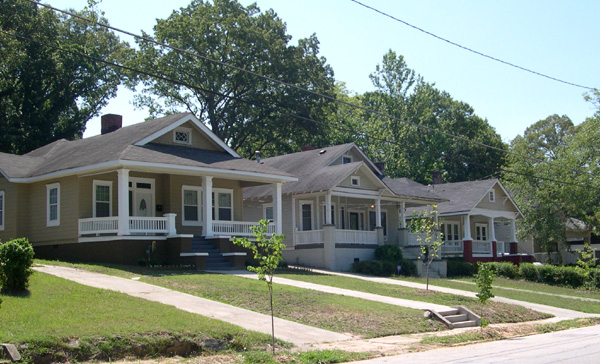
- 1910/20s bungalows are the most common house style in Westview
- Interactive map of Westview, Atlanta, Georgia
- Country: United States
- State: Georgia
- County: Fulton

Population (2010)
  - Total: 3,020
- ZIP code: 30310
- Area code: 404

Westview is a historic intown neighborhood located in southwest Atlanta, Georgia. It is named for the Westview Cemetery that borders the neighborhood to the northwest. The neighborhood is made up of a mixture of architectural styles including Arts & Crafts bungalows, Four-Squares, Tudors, Minimal Traditional, and Ranch style houses.

== Location ==
Westview's bordering streets are I-20 and Derry Avenue to the north, Langhorn Street and Cascade Avenue to the east, Beecher Street to the south, and South Gordon Street and Westmeath Drive to the west. Ralph David Abernathy Boulevard runs through the Westview neighborhood and houses a small historic commercial village center at the corners of East Ontario Avenue, Inman Street, and Lucile Avenue.

== History ==
Plan for Westwood Park, a subdivision that did not materialize

Westview is an example of an Atlanta streetcar neighborhood. In 1884 land was purchased to create the new Westview Cemetery. This, in turn, encouraged the West End and Atlanta Street Car Company to start grading in 1886 to extend its street car line 2 (the Ponce de Leon – Westview line) to the Westview Cemetery. Line 2 came from downtown Atlanta along Lucile Avenue to Ralph David Abernathy Boulevard and terminated in front of the Westview Cemetery gate. Thanks to the convenient connectivity the street car provided to the area development naturally continued to occur.

In 1888 the Ontario Land Company purchased several tracts of land for their newly planned suburban neighborhood named Westwood Park. Some of Westwood Park's original street boundaries were New Green's Ferry Avenue (now Westview Drive) to the north, Inman Street, Green's Ferry Road (now Ralph David Abernathy Blvd.) to the east, and Sandtown Road (now Cascade Avenue) to the southeast. The Ontario Land Company graded and beautified the land and promised amenities such as croquet and tennis courts based on the neighborhood plan.

Advertisement in The Atlanta Constitution for West End Park lot sales, June 9, 1910

Nevertheless, Westwood Park never materialized beyond land preparation. It was not until 1910 when William J. Davis bought portions of the Ontario Land Company parcel and hired civil engineer and landscape expert Solon Zachery Ruff (who also designed the Ansley Park neighborhood) to turn the area into a "residence park" known as West End Park. Streets in West End Park included East and West Ontario Avenue, Ontario Avenue, Willard Avenue, and the eastern portions of Stokes Avenue, South Gordon Street, Westwood Avenue, and Rogers Avenue. Davis continued to improve the land by laying water mains, gas mains, and adding cemented sidewalks before auctioning off subdivided parcels of land through Forrest and George Adair, leading to the construction and population of West End Park.

When the West End Park Company (led by Davis) applied for its charter with the superior court in 1909 it also applied for an extension of the City of Atlanta city limits so as to include the newly planned neighborhood within its boundaries. And so in 1910, the same year in which Davis created a housing boom by selling the subdivided Westwood Park lots, the City of Atlanta expanded its city limits to include West End Park within its boundaries. The neighborhood's changing architectural housing styles and seven additional city limit expansions (in 1922, 1923, 1925, 1926, 1930, 1940, and 1952) towards the west make it evident how the neighborhood naturally continued to grow over the years.

West End Park flourished for many years with an active neighborhood commercial district along Ralph David Abernathy Blvd. Many longtime and former residents still recall fond memories of the grocery store, butcher store, sundry, Clyatt's drug store with a soda fountain, and the Teddy Bear Grill at the intersection of Ralph David Abernathy Blvd. and Cascade Avenue.

Today West End Park is known as Westview, due to its proximity to the adjacent Westview Cemetery. Many neighborhood real estate listings still appear under the name West End Park.

The neighborhood has benefited from the renewed interest of living intown. Senior citizens that have lived in the neighborhood for the last 30 to 40 years are now joined by young professionals who enjoy the conveniences and amenities of intown living. As a result, neglected and vacant homes are being restored and the neighborhood in general is benefiting from renewed activities. In August 2005, the Westview Lofts, a mixed-use development including retail storefronts opened in the village. In December 2005, Westview was chosen to be the neighborhood of the month by the Atlanta Development Authority. After decades of decline, Westview rebounded with growing demand and property values. Also Westview has strongly increased in diversity since the 2000s.

== Government ==
The neighborhood belongs to neighborhood planning unit T (NPU-T) and has an active neighborhood association. Westview is in zone 4 of the Atlanta Police Department.

== Beltline ==
The Beltline passes through the eastern edge of the Westview neighborhood as part of the Beltline's "Model Mile". (See the map displaying the proposed areas.) The first trail to be built on the Beltline, the 2.4-mile West End Trail, was opened in 2008. It edges the neighborhood of the same name as well as serving Mozley Park and Westview. The trail stretches from White Street to Westview Cemetery. In Westview the trail is anchored by Enota Park. In February 2025, it was announced Enota Park will undergo a $2 million expansion. The expansion will include a large pavilion covered by a solar shade structure, an activity field, splash pad, passive gardens, a new playground, recreation areas, walking trails, board walk, large lawn, and a basketball court. The expansion is scheduled to be completed in 2026.

== Education ==
Westview contains both public and charter schools. Atlanta Public Schools service pre-k through grade 12 at Tuskegee Airmen Global (TAG) Academy, Herman J. Russell West End Academy, Booker T. Washington High School. Tuskegee Airmen Global Academy is located on Westhaven Drive SW and serves pre-k up to grade 5. Herman J. Russell West End Academy is located on Peeples Street SW and serves grades 6 through 8. Booker T. Washington High School is located on White House Drive and serves grades 9 through 12.

KIPP STRIVE Academy and KIPP STRIVE Primary are free charter schools located in Westview adjacent to the BeltLine corridor on Lucile Avenue in the former J.C. Harris Elementary School building. KIPP STRIVE Academy opened starting with the 2009 school year and serves grades 6 through 8. KIPP STRIVE Primary opened in 2012 and serves kindergarten through 5th grade.

== Neighborhood Organizations ==
There are two active neighborhood organizations within Westview:

Westview Community Organization (WCO) – The Westview Community Organization, which formed in 1974, is the largest and oldest neighborhood organization in Westview and encompasses the entire neighborhood. Key committees within the WCO are the Development Committee, which focuses on master planning and neighborhood improvement projects, and the Beautification Committee, which focuses on park maintenance and street cleanups. The WCO organizes a number of festivities throughout the year, such as a summer block party, National Night Out, and a Christmas party at Fire Station #17. Executive committee members are voted into office for one-year terms. The WCO meets the first Monday of every month at 7:00 PM at Calvary United Methodist Church (1471 Ralph David Abernathy Blvd.), the meeting is also broadcast via Zoom.

West End Coalition Group (WEC) – The West End Coalition formed in 1992 when neighbor's organized to prevent housing deterioration, blight and community destabilization. Despite what the name implies, the organization is located in Westview and encompasses a northeastern portion of the neighborhood. Its streets include Laurel Avenue, Wellington Street, Inman Street, Mathewson Place, Altoona Place, Enota Place, and Lucile Avenue. WEC meets the third Tuesday of every month at the Westview Lofts (1530 Ralph David Abernathy Blvd.) at 7:30pm.

== See also ==
- Gentrification of Atlanta
