= Nine-Mile Circle =

Defunct streetcar line in Atlanta

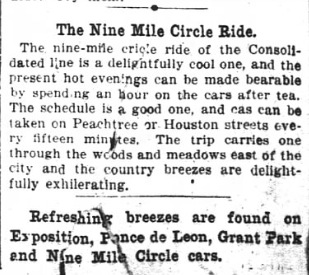
1896 Atlanta Constitution advertorial promoting the Nine Mile Circle

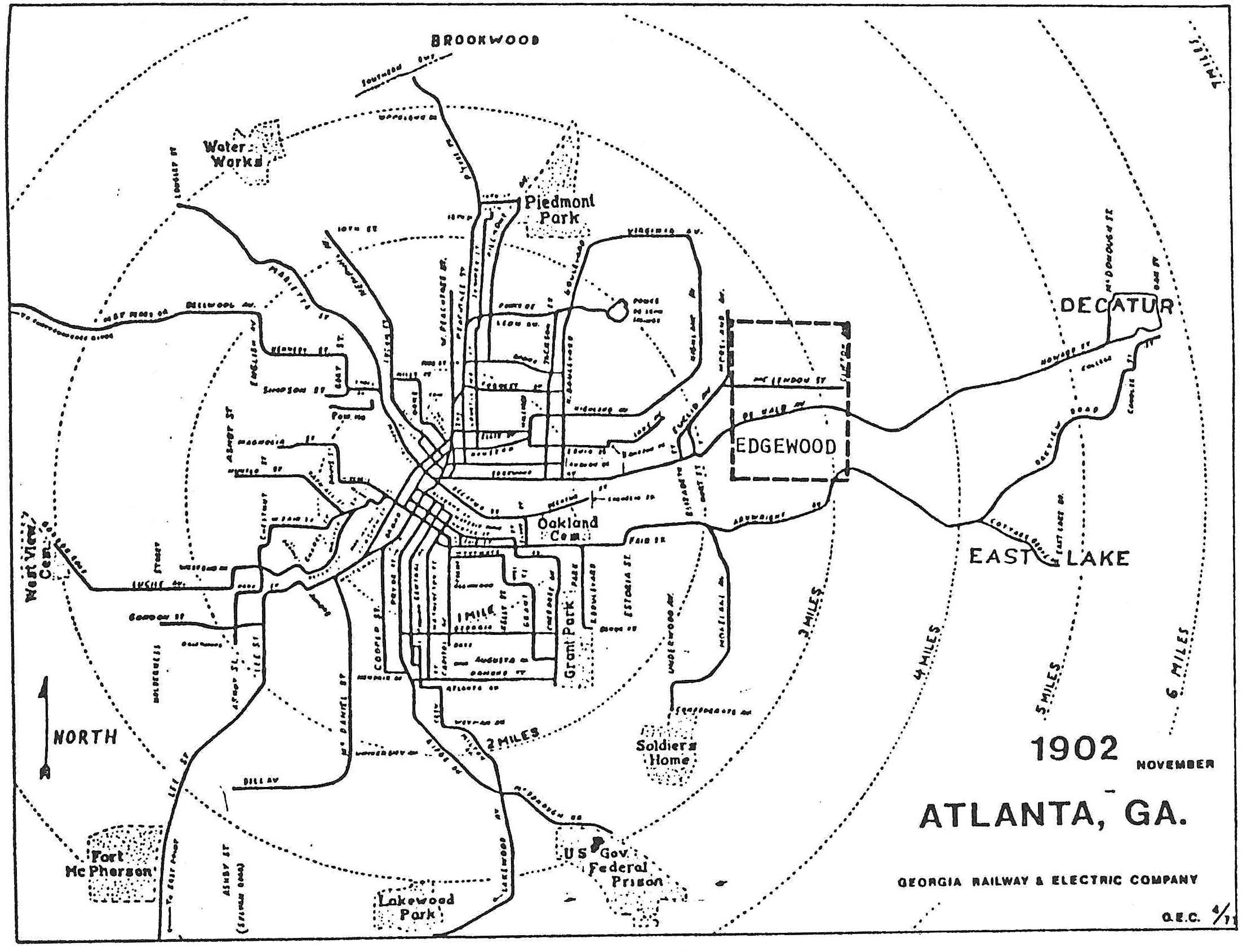
1902 map of Atlanta's streetcar network including Nine Mile Circle route

The Nine-Mile Circle (today often called the "Nine Mile Trolley") was a streetcar line of the Atlanta Street Railway, later the Atlanta Consolidated Street Railway which went from downtown Atlanta to today's Virginia-Highland neighborhood as follows:

- from Marietta and Broad to Peachtree Street and north along Peachtree
- east on what was then Houston St. (now most of which is called John Wesley Dobbs Ave., though parts of Houston St. no longer exist)
- north along N. Boulevard (now Monroe Dr.) to
- Ponce de Leon Ave. from where it made a loop:
  - north along N. Boulevard (now Monroe Dr.)
  - east on Virginia Ave.
  - south along N. Highland Ave., and
  - west on Ponce de Leon back to the intersection of Ponce de Leon and Boulevard.

The line started operation in late 1889, and was the second electric line in Atlanta, after the Edgewood line to Inman Park.

The line was an extension of an earlier horsecar line:

- The original line went from downtown Atlanta up Peachtree to Pine
- Extended in August 1872 to "Ponce de Leon Circle" (today's Ponce de Leon Ave.).
- At some point later it was extended to Ponce de Leon Springs, where the Ponce de Leon amusement park would be built; today, Ponce City Market (formerly the Sears building, then City Hall East) stands on the site.
- Finally in 1889 the line was electrified and extended with the "loop" around what is now Virginia-Highland.

In its heyday in the 1890s, the Nine-Mile Circle line was one of the streetcar lines popular for pleasure trips. It also took visitors to the Cotton States and International Exposition in 1895, held in what is today Piedmont Park.

At some point (it seems around 1901 as the line was frequently mentioned in the Atlanta Constitution and suddenly ceases to be mentioned after June 1901), service in a loop was discontinued (see map). Service to the area did continue as individual lines however:

- Along North Boulevard as far as Orme Circle
- Along Ponce de Leon Ave. from downtown past Druid Hills out to Decatur, and
- Along North Highland Ave. as far north as Virginia Ave.

== See also ==
- Streetcars in Atlanta
