= Augustus M. Reinhardt =

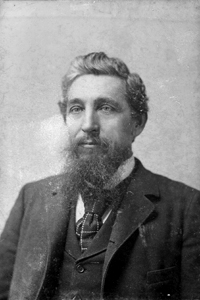
Capt. Augustus M. Reinhardt

Captain Augustus M. Reinhardt (1842–1923) was the namesake of Reinhardt University in Waleska, Georgia and a founder of Atlanta's Gate City Street Railroad Company. He was a Confederate war veteran, and had been a lawyer, city councilman and mayor pro tem.

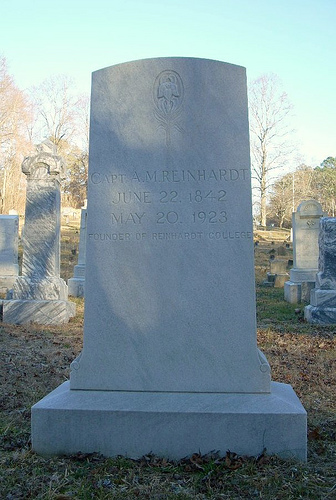
Capt. A. M. Reinhardt's grave located at Dogwood Community Church (formerly Briarpatch Methodist Evangelistic Church, c. 1834), Waleksa, Georgia
