= Levi B. Nelson =

American politician (1838–1903)

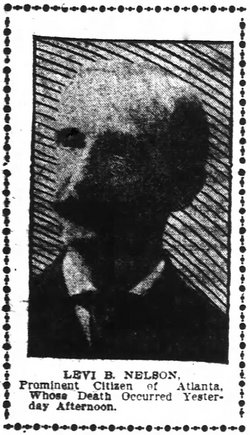
Levi Buell Nelson

Levi Buell Nelson (May 4, 1838 – August 28, 1903) was an Atlanta, Georgia city councilman, founder of the Gate City Street Railroad Company.

== Early life ==
Levi Buell Nelson was born on May 4, 1838, in Chemung County, New York, to Seth B. Nelson. His father was a physician and died when Nelson was 13 years old. After his death, he became as a clerk at a store in Cortland.

== Career ==
Nelson moved to Toledo, Iowa. He lived there from 1856 to 1881. He purchased large amounts of property and served on the city council and as mayor. He also served on the board of education. He served as third sergeant of company C of the 10th Iowa Infantry Regiment. He retired from service due to injuries. He organized and was made the first cashier of Toledo Savings Bank.

In 1881, Nelson moved to Atlanta with his real-estate partner C. P. N. Barker. They formed the real estate firm Nelson & Barker and bought farmland in Georgia. After Barker left the business, Nelson continued to operate the business by himself. In 1886, he was elected to the Atlanta city council. He served on the sanitary, relief, and water works committees. He also served as street commissioner. He served as president of the board of trustees of the Home for the Friendless up until his death. He founded the Gate City Street Railroad Company.

== Personal life ==
Nelson was commander of the O. M. Mitchel post of the Grand Army of the Republic. He was a deacon of the Central Congregational Church. He lived on the Boulevard in Atlanta. His home included 6 acres (2.4 ha) of land. The house was in today's Old Fourth Ward, then an elegant avenue of mansions, burned down in the Great Atlanta fire of 1917. In 1921, the site was acquired by Atlanta Medical Center for its present location.

Nelson married Eliza M. Hendry of New York state in 1866. They had five children, Levi D., Edith, George, Adelaide, and Franckie. His sister married Iowa judge George R. Struble.

Nelson died on August 28, 1903, at his home in Atlanta. He was buried at Woodlawn Cemetery in Toledo, Iowa.
