= West End & Atlanta Street Railroad =

The West End & Atlanta Street Railroad Company of Atlanta, Georgia was organized in 1872 by Thomas Alexander, M. G. Dobbins, B. J. Wilson, Benjamin H. Broomhead, Alvin K. Seago, J. M. Alexander, James Atkins, J. W. Goldsmith, John M. Harwell and Jonathan Norcross. The horsecar route started downtown and went via West End Avenue and Ashby Street (now Abernathy) to West End and Westview Cemetery.

== See also ==
- Streetcars in Atlanta
- Timeline of mass transit in Atlanta
