= Ormewood Park =

Neighborhood in Atlanta, Georgia, United States

Coordinates: 33.734°N 84.355°W

Ormewood Park is a historic neighborhood on the east side of Atlanta, Georgia, United States.

== History ==
This area was the territory of the Creek Indian Nation until approximately 1825 when the Treaty of Indian Springs was signed under Governor George Troup. He then began forcing the Creek from their lands and by 1827, they were all gone. Any white settler could enter a land lottery for the cost of $4.00, and 160 or 200-acre (0.81 km^{2}) parcels were awarded. Most of these lots were working farms until the late 19th century. In 1892, some of the farms were further subdivided into building lots of approximately 2 acres (8,100 m^{2}) in size. The Confederate Soldiers' Home was constructed on what is now the area occupied by the complex of Georgia National Guard and other State buildings on United Avenue.

A trolley line extension was constructed in 1891 by the Metropolitan Street Railroad Company running north–south along Underwood Avenue, from Confederate Avenue (renamed United Avenue in 2018) and the Confederate Soldiers' Home, turning east on Delaware Avenue and then connecting to the line that ran along Moreland Avenue, eventually ending in downtown. The line was originally run with steam operated “dummy” trains and was upgraded to electric trolleys in 1894. Its path can still be seen by examining the acute wall angles of the commercial buildings at the northeast corner Woodland and Delaware. The new retail development at the Ormewood and Moreland intersection makes use of this old path by providing rear access along the old right-of-way and bridge.

Ormewood Park was initially developed in 1892, when a 100-acre plot was subdivided by Samuel W. Goode and Company and put on the market for sale. After World War I there was a construction boom. There are even prefabricated and catalog homes from this era that survive to this day. In 1922, the City of Atlanta annexed the area and construction of Anne E. West Elementary School, located in the heart of Ormewood Park, began around that time. Anne E. West's classic building got a new life, new name, and new mission this century: it is home for the middle school campus of the neighborhood's charter school, which serves both the Grant Park and Ormewood Park neighborhoods.

Another period of growth took place after World War II. The wood-sided cottages scattered between the older Victorian and Craftsman homes are typical of this era. During the late 1950s and early 1960s a number of brick ranch-style homes appeared.

The neighborhood experienced a period of decline until the 1990s, when it began to gentrify. In the 2000s, Ormewood Park experienced a notable increase in renovations, property values, demand, and new housing stock as the surrounding areas improved and supporting retail and commercial centers were developed. In 2003, the northwest corner of the neighborhood was redeveloped as Glenwood Park, with townhomes, single-family homes, and retail establishments.

In 2016, the Ormewood Park Civic association, led by Festival founder Hannah Thompson, created the first Ormewood Park Makers Festival, which was attended by almost two thousand people. The festival celebrates local craftsman, live music, workshops and more. The Ormewood Park Makers Festival continues as part of SAND (South Atlantans for Neighborhood Development).

== Geography ==
Ormewood Park is east of Grant Park (separated by the Atlanta Beltline), south of I-20, west of East Atlanta, and north of United Avenue.
