= Rolf Beeler =

Swiss affineur

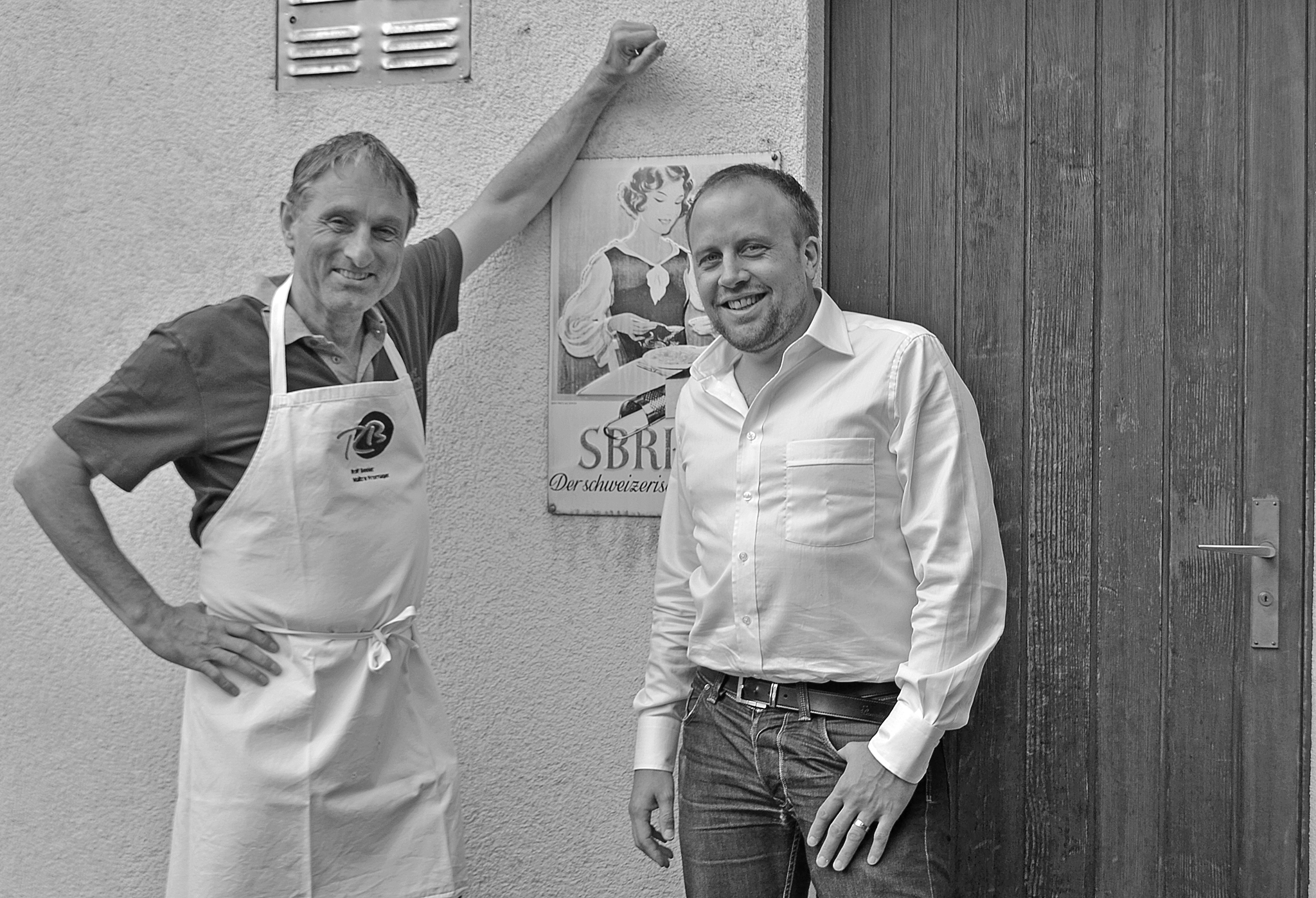
- Maitre Fromager Rolf Beeler and his Australia/New Zealand importer Tom Merkli
- Occupation: Affineur

Rolf Beeler is a Swiss affineur known for his raw milk artisan cheeses. While he does not make cheese himself, Beeler collects terroir-based cheeses from small artisanal cheesemakers and then ages them to create the final product.

== Career ==
After completing his education, Rolf Beeler worked as a school teacher and DJ. He ran his own grocery store for a time before selling it to instead work directly with cheese makers abroad, including French cheesemaker Bernard Antony.

Beeler turned his house basement into a small cheese cellar and started to age and ripen his favourite cheeses, which he bought from small local producers.

After succeeding in production of traditional Swiss cheeses, he started to develop new cheese recipes in collaboration with his fellow cheesemakers, beginning with wine-washed Hoch Ybrig. He became known in Switzerland as “the Pope of cheese”.

== Sélection ==
By the end of the 1990s, Beeler decided to expand to foreign markets and introduced his Sélection Rolf Beeler at the Slow Food Fair Salone del Gusto in Turin, Italy, in 1998. By 2013, Sélection could be found on the menus of more than 120 top restaurants in Germany, England, Switzerland, Scandinavia, USA and Australia.

== Awards ==
- Toggenburger Sélection Rolf Beeler won gold medal at World Cheese Award 2009 held in Gran Canaria.
- Jersey Blue by Willi Schmid won the gold medal at the 2010 and 2012 World Jersey Cheese Awards.
- Max McCalman rated 186 cheeses in his book, Cheese: A Connoisseur's Guide to the World's Best. 17 of the top 30 are from Rolf Beeler with the top spot going to Beeler's Sbrinz.
