= Leland I. Anderson =

American technical writer and electrical engineer (1928–2021)

Leland I. Anderson (1928 – October 15, 2021) was a technical writer and electrical engineer who was credited with helping renew interest in the work of Nikola Tesla. His long-time interest in Nikola Tesla took root in the early 1950s, and his activities since then have resulted in his recognition as one of the world's foremost Tesla historians. He founded the Tesla Society and edited the Tesla Society Newsletter Tesliana for many years, beginning in the 1950s.

His extensive archive on Nikola Tesla and his work, the largest in the United States and second only to that of the Tesla Museum in Belgrade, Yugoslavia, has been acquired by the Historical Society of Western Pennsylvania in Pittsburgh and is now open for public access. Mr. Anderson's Nikola Tesla Photograph Archive is being acquired by the Tesla Science Center at Wardenclyffe and is now available for commercial use.

Anderson was a resident of St. Paul, Minnesota, when he died on October 15, 2021, at the age of 93.
