= 1950 Atlanta transit strike =

1950 labor strike in Atlanta, Georgia, United States

The Atlanta transit strike of 1950 was a lengthy transit strike that lasted from May 18, 1950, to December 16, 1950, in Atlanta, Georgia.

A month after author Margaret Mitchell was struck and killed by a taxi during a year when trolleys had killed five, there was a call in the city to increase safety on city streets. The city council passed an ordinance which required all cab and trolley drivers to apply for a permit.

It required a $5 fee and a fingerprint which was the only method at the time to trace criminal records.

The fingerprinting in particular was fought by Jesse Walton, president of Amalgamated Street Car Local 732, first in court cases which losses he appealed up to the United States Supreme Court (who declined to hear).

Still not willing to comply, Walton called for a strike which began on May 18, 1950.

Police Chief Herbert Jenkins suspended all force vacations to staff downtown intersections all day long to handle the great increase in automobile traffic.

Mayor William Hartsfield called for legalized jitneys (which required a similar permit) to help reduce some of the traffic.

The strike was to last 37 days and as Hartsfield's law was written, jitney permits were immediately revoked.

The union voted to get permits on November 16, 1950, and found themselves working for a new company, the Atlanta Transit Company, as the former transit operator in Atlanta, Georgia Power, used this opportunity to get out of the transit business.
