= Confederate Soldiers' Home =

Former care home in Atlanta, Georgia, US

Coordinates: 33.727473°N 84.363212°W

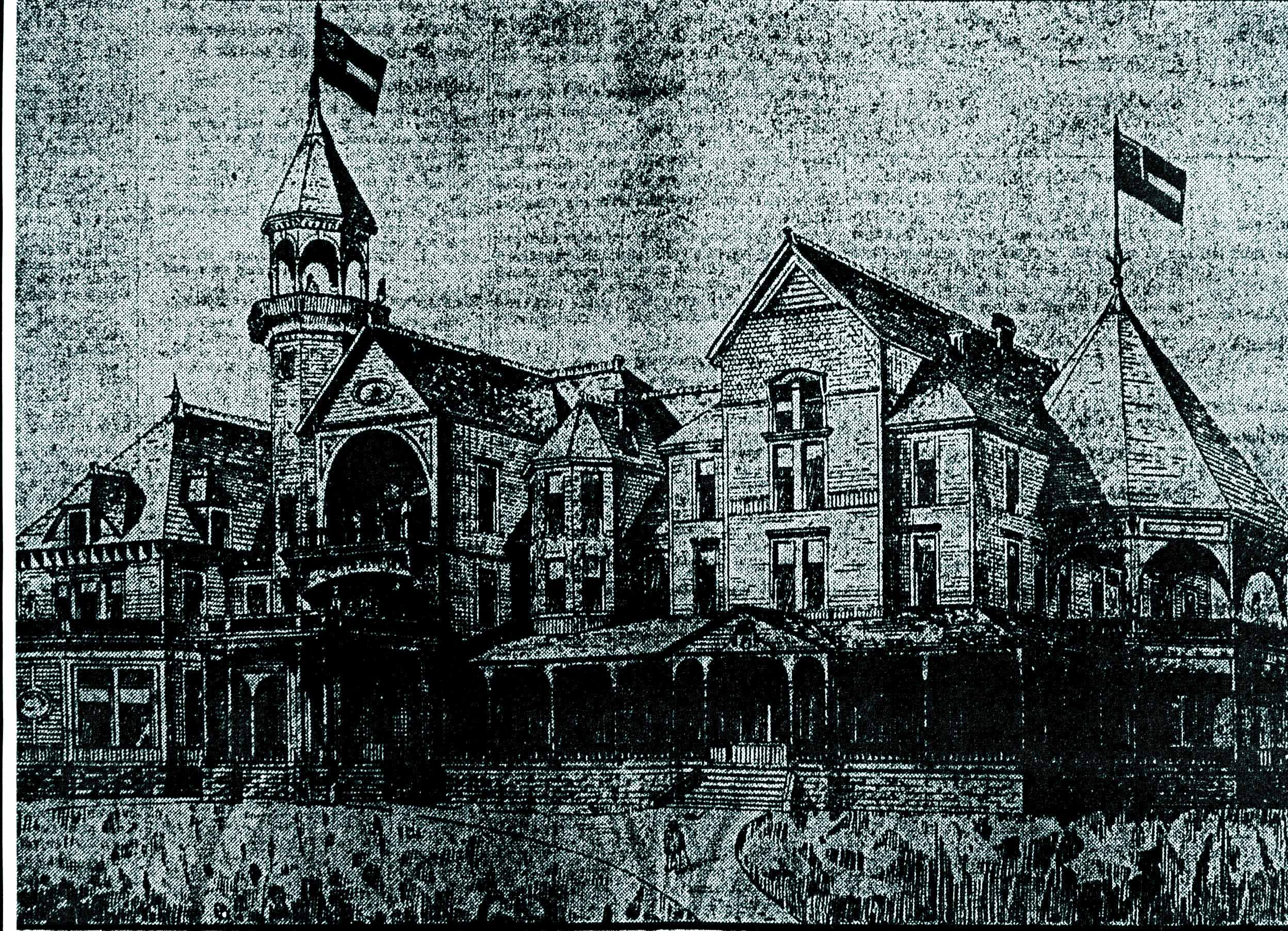
First Confederate Soldiers' Home (built 1890)

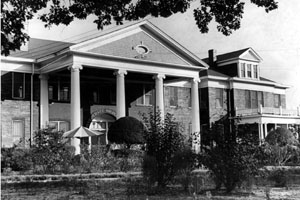
Second Confederate Soldiers' Home (built 1902)

The first Atlanta Confederate Soldiers' Home (also called the Old Soldiers' Home) was built in 1890 with the support of Henry W. Grady at a cost of $45,000. Grady proposed the idea first in 1889, and began to raise funds through "subscriptions". Due to lack of funds the home did not open until 1900. It stood at 410 E. United Avenue (formerly Confederate Avenue) on the south edge of the Ormewood Park neighborhood of Atlanta, Georgia. In September, 1901 it burned down, shortly after it was occupied. and was rebuilt in 1902 at the same location with support from the Inman family.

In 1924 a scandal arose over mistreatment of the soldiers at the home. The oldest veteran of the Civil War, Lorenzo Grace, died there in 1928. The last veteran to share the home was Henry Taylor Dowling whose entry was recorded on April 17, 1941. The Home housed widows of Confederate veterans beginning in the 1940s before closing in 1963. It was demolished in late 1963 or early 1964. Georgia National Guard and other state offices occupy the site.
