= Selby Beeler =

American writer

Selby Beeler is the author of the books Throw Your Tooth on the Roof: Tooth Traditions Around the World and How Many Elephants? A Lift the Flap Counting Book.

== Biography ==
She grew up in Rochester, Minnesota, moved to New York for college and work, on to Alabama with her husband and then back to Rochester, Minnesota, where they live with one hand-me-down cat. In addition to raising two above-average children, Selby has, at various times, taught swimming and canoeing, rescued baby birds, worked for a fashion magazine, drawn a weekly cartoon for an Army newspaper, written weekly newspaper articles, and co-owned two children's stores for which she wrote and illustrated all the advertising.

== Books ==
- Throw Your Tooth on the Roof: Tooth Traditions Around the World Illustrated by G. Brian Karas; Houghton Mifflin, 1998; Ages 4–8; ISBN 0-395-89108-6 -- "It happens to everyone, everywhere, all over the world. 'Look! Look! My tooth fell out! My tooth fell out!' But what happens next? What in the world do you do with your tooth?" The answer depends on the traditions of your parents and grandparents and great-grandparents. Do you throw your tooth at the sun? Leave it for a mouse? Hide it by a bush? Put in under your pillow? or Feed it to a dog? As Redbook Magazine wrote, this book "... turns a seemingly ordinary custom into a window on the world."

This book has also been published in Japanese, Greek, Korean, and simplified Chinese.

- How Many Elephants? A Lift the Flap Counting Book illustrated by Barney Saltzberg; Candelwick Press, 2004; Ages 2–5; ISBN 0-7636-1583-8. -- How many elephants are in your closet? That's ridiculous! Elephants don't go into people's closets ... or do they? This, as it says on the back cover, is a "... seriously silly lift-the-flap counting book."

== Magazines ==
- Round and Round in Time - The History of Carousels Cricket Magazine
