= City Building (Illinois) =

- U.S. National Register of Historic Places
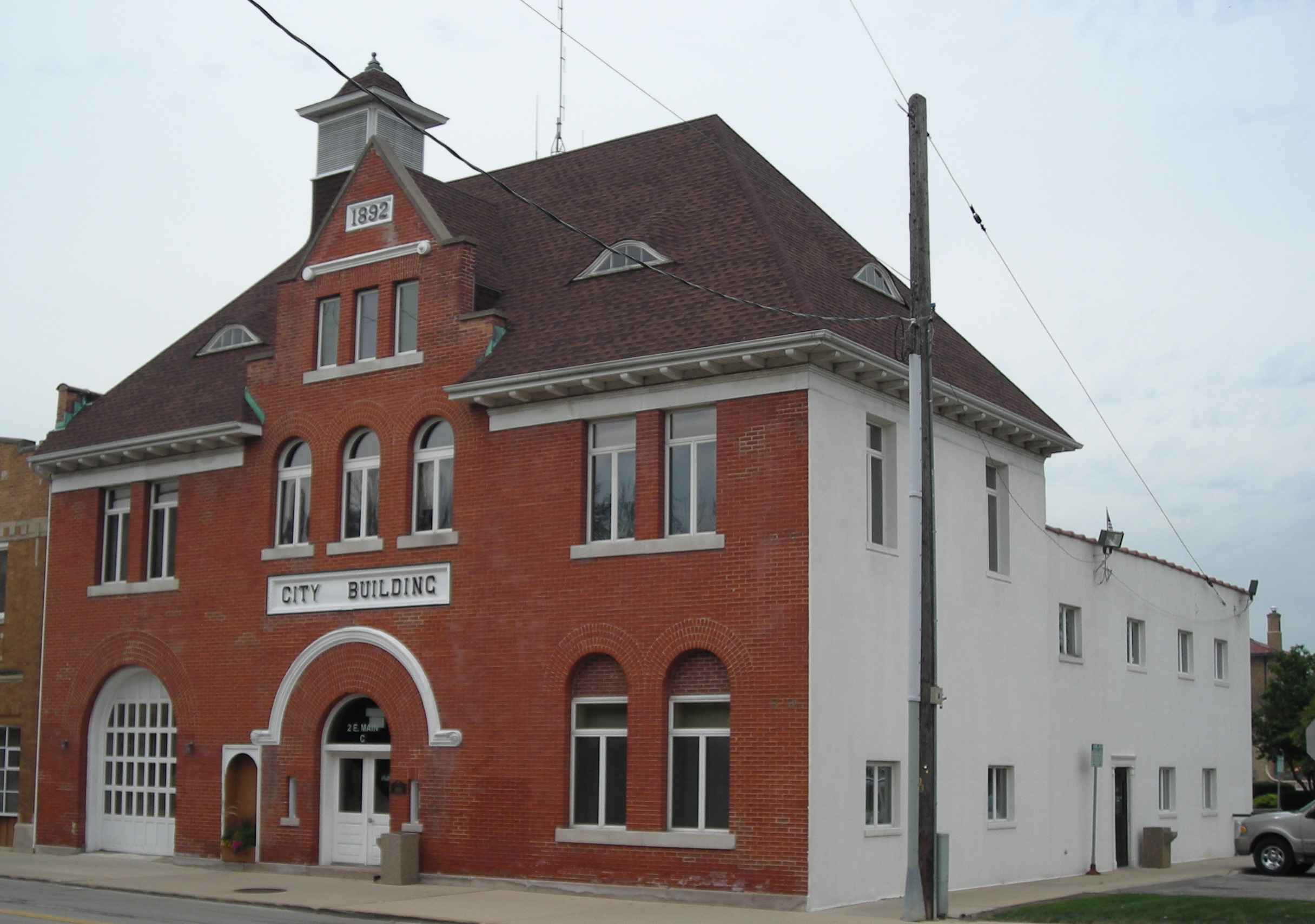
- Location: St Charles, Kane County, Illinois, United States
- Coordinates: 41°54′50.8″N 88°18′45.51″W
- Built: 1892
- Architect: F. W. Alexander
- Architectural style: Romanesque
- NRHP reference No.: 79000847
- Added to NRHP: March 21, 1979

The City Building is a Registered Historic Place in St. Charles, Illinois. It was the first structure in the city built specifically for government use, and has served variously as town hall, police station, fire house, circuit court, and public works monitoring station.

== History ==
St. Charles, Illinois was first settled in 1833 and was incorporated as a city in 1874. In the early 1890s, it became apparent that the settlement needed a main government building from which to conduct affairs. Mayor A. H. Bennett commissioned the structure that year, authorizing the purchase of the property from B. T. Hunt for $1,500 in 1891. The St. Charles City Council approved the building on March 12, 1892, accepting a bid from local builder F. W. Alexander for $5,496. The building received its common name from the words "City Building" that were carved into the front of the structure. The building functioned as St. Charles city hall until 1941, and still housed police and fire services until 1962. The 16th Judicial Circuit Court also used the building in the 1950s and 1960s. It was listed on the National Register of Historic Places on March 21, 1979.

== Architecture ==
The circular, brick City Building stands two stories tall, and is an example of eclectic influences on Victorian architecture. The building is adjacent to the Fox River (to the west) with its main entrance on the east side at 15 N. Riverside Avenue. The roof is hipped and features a bell tower on the southeastern side, capped with a Byzantine roof. Several shed dormer windows break through the main roof. The soffit is decorated with wood brackets. The front is split into three bays; the middle bay extends beyond the roof to create a large pediment. This dormer allows for an attic. The main set of double doors is beneath a stilted arch. Rectangular, double hung windows on the first floor are also beneath stilted arches, with two large windows north of the entrance and a large door (originally for fire engines) on the south. The second floor has symmetrical pairs of windows on either side of the main bay, with three smaller windows on the center bay. On the interior, a straight staircase leads to the second floor, splitting two large rooms on the first floor. The second floor is similarly split into two rooms, with two small rooms above the entrance.
