= West End, Atlanta =

Historic, mostly African-American neighborhood of Atlanta, Georgia, United States

- West End Historic District
- U.S. National Register of Historic Places
- U.S. National Historic Landmark District
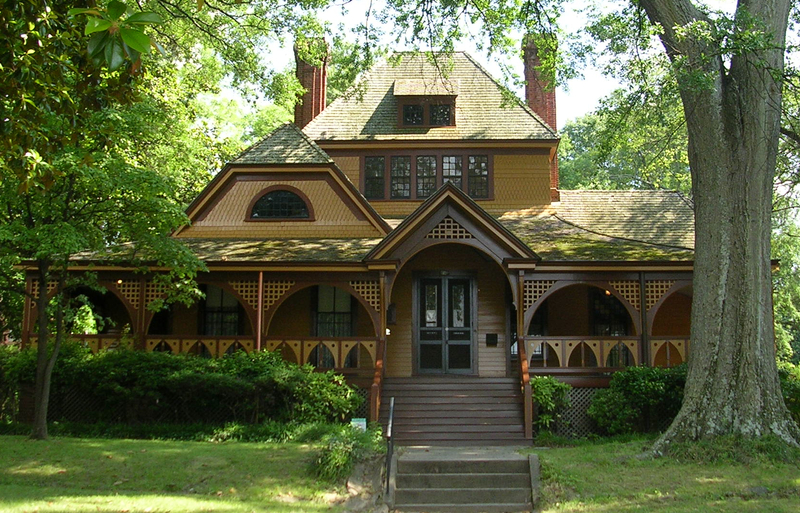
- The Wren's Nest, author Joel Chandler Harris's home in West End

- Location within Atlanta
- Location: Atlanta, Georgia, United States
- Coordinates: 33°44′16″N 84°25′23″W
- Architect: Humprhies, George P.; Adair, G.W., et al.
- Architectural style: Late 19th And Early 20th Century American Movements, Late 19th And 20th Century Revivals, Late Victorian
- NRHP reference No.: 97000621
- Added to NRHP: February 25, 1999

West End is a historic neighborhood in the U.S. city of Atlanta, one of the oldest outside Downtown Atlanta, and is listed on the National Register of Historic Places. West End is located southwest of Castleberry Hill, east of Westview, west of Adair Park Historic District, and just north of Oakland City. Architectural styles within the neighborhood include Craftsman Bungalow, Queen Anne, Stick style, Folk Victorian, Colonial Revival, American Foursquare and Neoclassical Revival.

== History ==
In this century, West End has endured many changes in its metamorphosis to an intown neighborhood while retaining its own distinctive character and vitality. This has been accomplished both by adaptation and participation in change and by its citizens' recognition of the district's special history.

=== Early history ===
Before there was a West End or an Atlanta, the area was a crossroads. Newnan Road connected the town of that name to Decatur and Lawrenceville. Crossing this road was the Sandtown Road going west to an Indian town of that name. Near this junction around 1830, Charner Humphries established an inn/tavern which came to be known as Whitehall due to the then unusual fact that it had a coat of white paint when most other buildings were of washed or natural wood.

From a frontier outpost in the 1830s, the district evolved into an independent political entity closely linked by rail and roads to its neighbor Atlanta.

In April 1871, Richard Peters and George Adair bought out the charter of the Atlanta Street Railway Company (horse-drawn) and on September 1 of that year opened the first section connecting Five Points to the West End – a route that passed by both of their homes. The following year the West End & Atlanta Street Railroad also started service to West End and Westview Cemetery.

By the 1880s many wealthy Atlantans built large estates here and when they came, the main street of Gordon Street became a bustling commercial district. In 1894, it was annexed by Atlanta as a distinct ward following two decades of planned suburbanization. From 1894 to 1930, West End grew rapidly in population and prosperity. An examination of building permits for Peeples, Gordon, Lee and Lawton Streets shows a large number of single family residences being built and increasing commercial buildings and churches going up along Gordon and at the long established business district at Gordon and Lee. National and local prosperity and the mobility created by the automobile in the 1920s helped West End to grow. Approximately fifty businesses were now clustered at Gordon and Lee with branches of Sears, Firestone, Piggly-Wiggly, and Goodyear.

Churches and schools increased to serve the growing population. Schools began to dot West End, the largest being the 1923 Joseph E. Brown High School at Peeples and Beecher. West End became a desirable suburban community in the 1880s, and grew rapidly in population and prosperity, so that by 1930 there were more than 22,000 residents.

Notable residents in this early period included Atlanta mayor Dennis Hammond, Evan Howell, governor James Smith (1872–77), John Conley (son of Governor Benjamin Conley), Thomas Stokes (founding partner of Davison's Department Store), L. Z. Rosser (president of the Atlanta Board of Education), J. P. Allen (clothing store owner), T. D. Longino (medical doctor and alderman), J. N. McEachern (insurance executive), as well as several authors such as Frank L. Stanton, Madge Bigham and Joel Chandler Harris, known for his Uncle Remus Tales. Both during his life and up to the present, Harris has perhaps been West End's most famous resident. He attracted such figures as President Theodore Roosevelt and Andrew Carnegie to Atlanta, the former returning after Harris' death to lecture for the Uncle Remus Memorial Association.

Home of George F. Bolles

Home of Clark Howell, Jr.

Home of Captain Evan Howell

Home of John Thrasher

=== Transition ===
After 1930, West End was an aging but still vital Atlanta community. This vitality is most clearly evident in the West End Businessmen's Association (originally formed in 1927). In 1937, the Association pushed for extension of the National Housing Act title providing for home modernization loans, and in subsequent decades (1950s and 1960s) for economic accessibility and population stabilization, including segregation. With the group's support, Gordon Street was widened, Interstate 20 was built across West End's northern fringe, and the old business district (along with large amounts of residential housing) was demolished in favor of a mall development. Completed in 1973, the mall's accessibility was later augmented by part of the city's latest transportation system, a MARTA station, across the street. The West End Businessmen's Association obviously was successful in many areas, but it failed in stopping "white flight". By 1976, West End was eighty-six percent Afro-American.

The West End is also home to the West Hunter Street Baptist Church was moved to Gordon Street. This church has been one of Atlanta's leading black churches for decades and since 1961 was led, until his death, by the Reverend Ralph David Abernathy. Jesse Jackson came to West End to speak at the opening of the new church. A close friend and confidante of Martin Luther King, Jr., Abernathy participated in most of the civil rights campaigns of the 1960s and 1970s and succeeded King as president of the Southern Christian Leadership Conference. In honor of his nationally recognized contributions to the civil rights movement, Gordon Street was renamed Ralph David Abernathy Boulevard, in 1991. In addition, neighborhood residents formed the West End Neighborhood Development, Inc. (WEND), in 1974, with the goal of improving the socioeconomic position of their community and its residents. In order to increase awareness of the West End neighborhood, WEND has sponsored a tour of homes, a yearly festival in Howell Park, and a driving tour booklet highlighting neighborhood homes and cultural and religious centers.

Former SNCC chairman and Black Panther Party member, H. Rap Brown, relocated to the West End in the late 1970s or early 1980s. By this time, he had embraced Islam and changed his name to Jamil Abdullah Al-Amin. After joining the Muslim community in the West End (part of a national network known simply as The Community), he became known as Imam Jamil. Imam is an Arabic word referring to "leader" in Muslim communities. Imam Jamil became known for seeking to rid the neighborhood of drugs and prostitution. Today, the Muslim community maintains both a mosque and an Islamic center within walking distance of the park in the heart of the neighborhood. Though he was incarcerated in 2000, and given a life sentence, Imam Jamil's influence continues to be felt in the community.

=== Renewal ===
By the 2000s, much of it still looked abandoned and blighted but a growing wave of investment in intown southwest Atlanta began to rejuvenate the area. As West End was once described as one of Atlanta's most socially diverse and culturally rich communities, it is again returning to the tradition of its past, as it relates to the regenerating of community value and revitalization. An example of revitalization in West End is Sky Lofts, which converted a long vacant Sears parking lot. Sky Lofts brought a lot of new residents, especially young professionals, looking for urban lifestyle. Historic houses are being rehabbed and renovated by new and old residents. West End, as its name suggests (named after London's theater district), is also a mecca for artists. West End was chosen by Creative Loafing in 2010 as "Best Neighborhood For Artists."

In addition to being a hub for artists, historically West End has been a hub for Atlanta's Afrocentric community. Afrocentric vegan restaurants, the Shrine of the Black Madonna church, the Hammonds House, the African Djeli, and nearby private historically Black colleges and universities contribute to the West End being one of the more visible hubs of Afrocentric culture in Metro Atlanta. However, in recent years, the neighborhood has been experiencing growing demand and a strong influx of diversity. The West End, as with most of Atlanta, has become more economically, culturally, politically, and racially diverse since the 21st century.

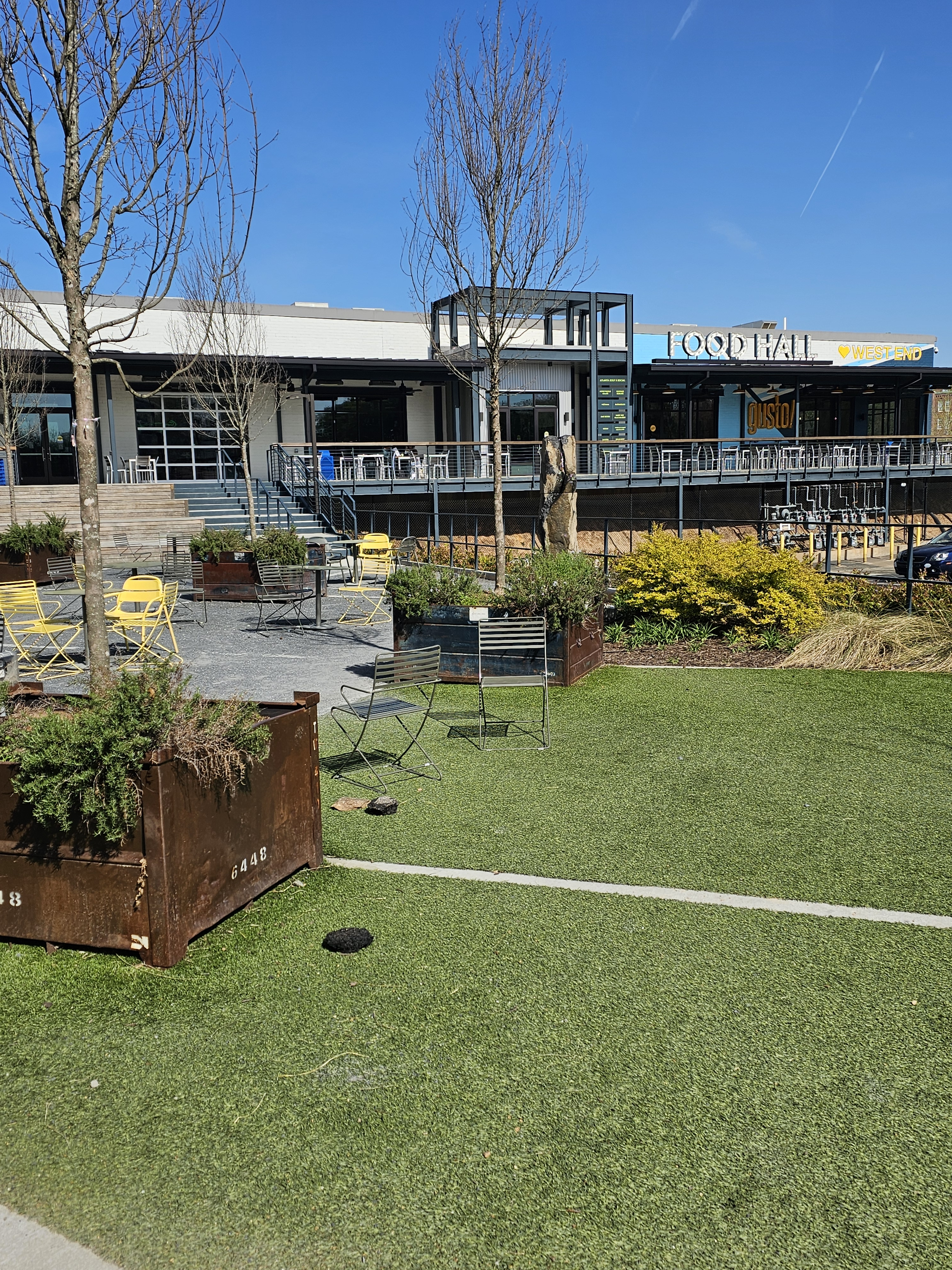
Lee + White

The Lee + White development, which opened in 2018, transformed the former "Warehouse Row," a cluster of large, abandoned warehouses, into a vibrant mixed-use destination. Today, it features a mix of breweries, restaurants, bars, retailers, businesses, food manufacturers, and a food hall.

In October 2024, it was announced that the abandoned warehouse at 1200 White Street would be partly transformed into a pickleball club named Dill Dinkers. Dill Dinkers opened its first Atlanta-area franchise in early 2025. Retail space, office space, and restaurants are scheduled to be added to 1200 White Street.

Mall West End, also known as West End Mall or the Mall West End, was a shopping mall in the West End neighborhood of Atlanta, Georgia. in October 2024, it was announced the deteriorating West End Mall, originally opened in 1972, will undergo a $450 million revitalization. The Mall West End officially closed on January 31, 2025, to make way for the One West End Atlanta mixed-use redevelopment. The redevelopment is being led through a partnership between Atlanta Urban Development and the Atlanta Beltline. The project will introduce a variety of new amenities, including a grocery store, a fitness center, retail space, 900 rental units—many designed for college students, 12,000 square feet of medical office space, and a 150-room hotel. Phase one completion is anticipated by 2026.

== Parks and BeltLine ==
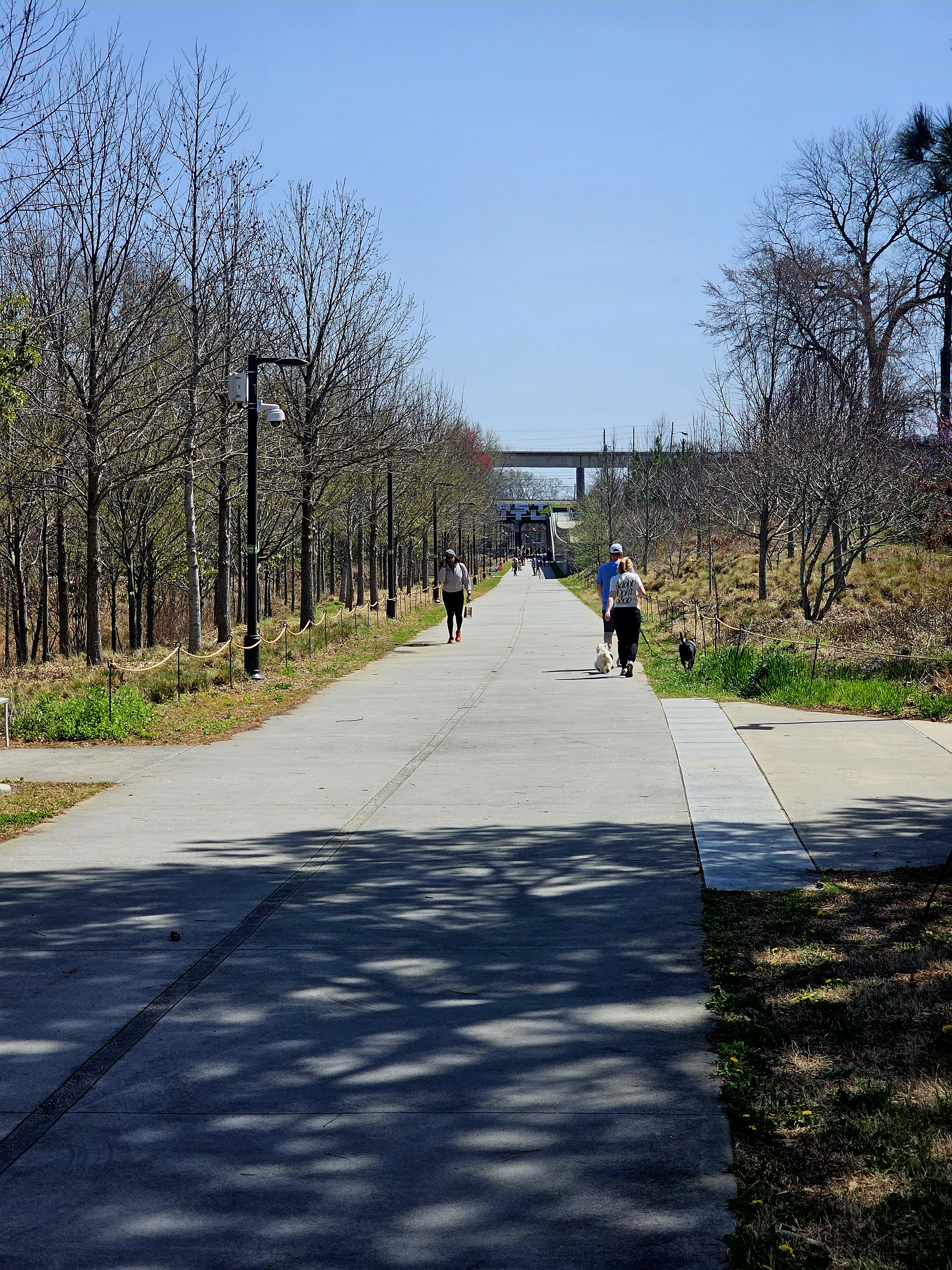
BeltLine in West End

West End is also a pioneer neighborhood for the BeltLine project in Atlanta. The first model mile was completed in the spring of 2008. The model mile consists of the biking and walking path, improvement of Gordon-White Park, and one new park behind Brown Middle School. In addition Trees Atlanta planted 200 trees native to West End which will be part of a 22-mile (35 km) linear arboretum that will follow the BeltLine corridor. Livable Center Initiative (LCI) granted funds for West End to renovate and improve its streetscape to make it a more walkable community. West End is included in the Peachtree Corridor plan. With the Peachtree Corridor, the BeltLine, and MARTA, West End is one of the most transit-oriented neighborhoods in Atlanta. Along the BeltLine in West End is the Lee + White which is a large mixed-use development that has 23 acres of businesses, eateries, and a greenspace. In 2024, it was announced 23 brand new modern townhomes will be built along the BeltLine in the neighborhood. The townhomes were scheduled to be complete in 2026.

== Landmarks ==
- Joel Chandler Harris Home (Wren's Nest) - the home of the writer of the Uncle Remus books
- Saint Anthony of Padua Catholic Church - the third oldest Catholic parish in Atlanta (est. 1903)
- Hammonds House Museum of African American fine art
- Shrine of the Black Madonna Culture Center
- West End Performing Arts Center
- West Hunter Street Baptist Church

== Education ==
Atlanta Public Schools serve the West End.

The Roman Catholic Archdiocese of Atlanta operates area Catholic schools. Saint Anthony of Padua School in the West End was established in 1912. In 1997 it had 125 students. It permanently closed in Spring 2001

Atlanta-Fulton Public Library System operates the West End Branch.

== Transportation ==
West End is located on the south side of Interstate 20 at the Joseph E. Lowery Blvd. exit. It is also served by the West End MARTA station and MARTA buses.

== Trivia ==
- Settled in 1835, the original name of the West End was White Hall (after the White Hall Inn); it was renamed in 1867 after London's theatre district.
- White Hall Inn, located on the corner of Lee Street and Ralph David Abernathy Blvd, was so named because it was painted white when most buildings of the time were unpainted.
- White Hall Inn was also the stagecoach shop, tavern, post office and home of the 503rd Militia district, as well as the election precinct.
- West End officially became a part of Atlanta on January 1, 1894.
- The West End District was the first locally designated historic district in the City of Atlanta.
- The layout of the original West End was a main street and adjacent grid pattern streets; three right turns and you were back where you started
- Outkast made their public debut at Club Fritz, in West End.
- In the successful play Madea Goes to Jail by Tyler Perry, Madea refers to the West End twice; first she says she lives in the West End, then says to the "country pimp" to try to cross Lee street or come to the 4200 block of Avon Avenue.
- West End is mentioned in the 2021 Kanye West single, "Hurricane" by guest artist Lil Baby.
