= Gate City Street Railroad =

The Gate City Street Railroad Company of Atlanta, Georgia was chartered by the state of Georgia on September 26, 1879. The individuals involved in the formation of the company included Laurent DeGive (Belgian consul and opera house owner), Levi B. Nelson (city councilman), Capt. Augustus M. Reinhardt (namesake of Reinhardt University) and John Stephens. In 1884 they built a line which started at the Kimball House and went via Pryor, Wheat and Jackson Streets to Ponce de Leon Springs. The line operated until January 1887, when it was sold.

== See also ==
- Streetcars in Atlanta
- Timeline of mass transit in Atlanta
