= Trolleybuses in Atlanta =

Transit system in Atlanta

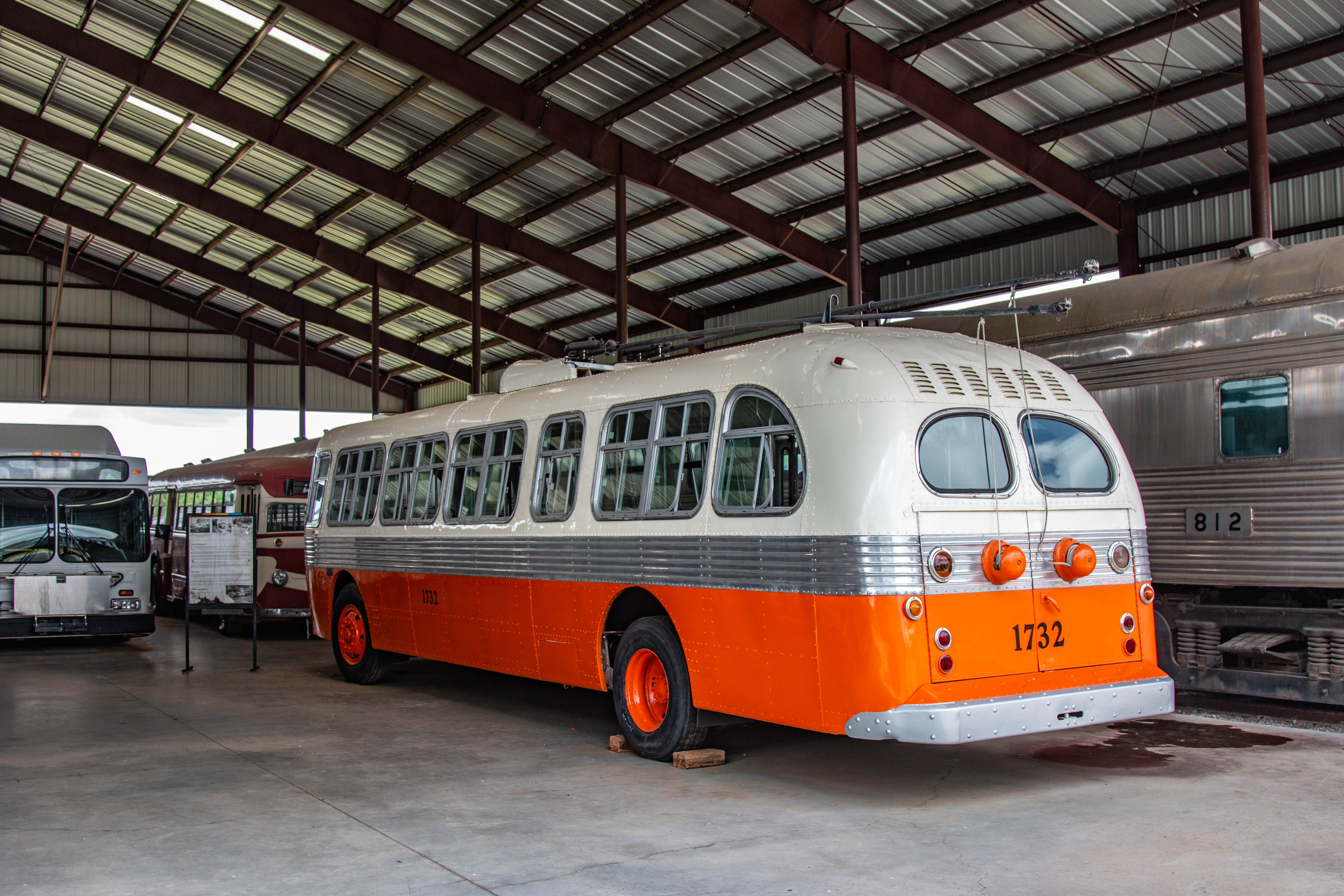
Atlanta trolleybus 1732, built by the St. Louis Car Company, is preserved at the Southeastern Railway Museum.

Trolleybuses in Atlanta, Georgia, generally called trackless trolleys there, were a major component of the public transportation system in Atlanta in the middle decades of the 20th century, carrying some 80 percent of all transit riders during the period when the system was at its maximum size. At the end of 1949 Atlanta had a fleet of 453 trolleybuses, the largest in the United States, and it retained this distinction until 1952, when it was surpassed by Chicago.

== History ==
=== Origins ===
As in many other cities, trolleybuses mostly took over streetcar routes. Some Atlanta streetcar lines were converted to buses starting in 1925. Those early conversions were to "motor buses" (gasoline-powered buses), but starting in 1937 some streetcar lines were converted instead to trolleybuses. The first trolleybus route opened on June 28, 1937, and was a suburban route to East Point and with branches beyond to College Park and Hapeville. A second route opened in 1940. Conversions continued until closure of the last streetcar line, in 1949.

In 1950, 453 trolleybuses served 31 routes. Trolleybuses made up 70% of the fleet, but carried 80% of the transit system's riders.

=== Operation, continued growth ===
The transit system was owned and operated by the Georgia Power Company until June 1950, at which point it was sold to a group of local businessmen, who formed the Atlanta Transit Company (ATC). Trolleybus service continued, and the large network of electric routes remained largely intact for another decade. One of the system's unusual features was express operation, uncommon on trolleybus systems. Express service ultimately was implemented on eight routes, and these were equipped with 250-foot-long (76 m) "sidings" in the overhead trolley wires to enable vehicles on express trips to pass those on "local" trips. Although the pace of expansion slowed after 1950, it did not cease. Extensions continued to be built under ATC, including the conversion of bus line 26-Perry Homes to trolleybuses in November 1956, and extensions of that route in 1960 and 1962. There were 39 trolleybus routes at the end of 1962.

=== Closure ===
In late 1962 Atlanta Transit decided to phase out all trolleybus service the next year, to avoid the expense of having to string new overhead wires when extending service to new areas. Another reason cited was the anticipated high cost and difficulty of obtaining new trolleybuses to replace ATC's large fleet, which ranged in age from 14 to 17 years. Since 1959, when Marmon-Herrington ceased production of trolleybuses, no manufacturer in North America was still making the electric vehicles (a situation which lasted until the late 1960s). At the beginning of 1963 the active fleet included 273 trolleybuses. The entire electric system was converted to diesel buses over a period of less than one month in September 1963. Atlanta's last trolleybus service operated on the night of September 27, 1963.

== Fleet ==
Over the years, Georgia Power (GP) purchased its trolleybuses from four different manufacturers: Twin Coach, the St. Louis Car Company, Pullman-Standard and Brill. The first came in 1937, the last in 1949. GP's successor, Atlanta Transit Company, never purchased a trolleybus.

=== Fleet list ===
Numbers	Qty	Builder	Model	Year	Notes
1001-1027	27	Twin Coach	40RWFTT	1937	
1028-1029	2	Twin Coach	40RTT	1939	
1030-1040	11	Twin Coach	40GTT	1940	
1041-1048	8	Twin Coach	40GTT	1943	
1101-1131	31	St. Louis	Job 1707	1940	
1201-1210	10	Pullman		1941	
1211-1228	18	Pullman		1944	
1229-1234	6	Pullman		1945	
1235-1334	100	Pullman	45CX	1946-47	1296 preserved at the Southeastern Railway Museum
1335-1394	60	Pullman		1948	1386 is now a restaurant in Ball Ground, Georgia.
1501-1540	40	Brill	TC44	1946	
1701-1820	20	St. Louis	Job 1749	1949	1732 and 1756 preserved at the Southeastern Railway Museum
1821-1840	20	St. Louis	Job 1761	1949	
Total	453				

== Routes ==
An early 1950s map of the trolleybus system detailed the following routes:

- 1 Howell Mill Rd via Marietta St to Collier Rd
- 2 Lucile Ave.
  - 2PD Ponce de Leon Avenue-Clairmont Ave-Ponce to Decatur (Poplar)
  - 2G via Lucile to West End (Inman)
  - 2W West View via Lucile Ave to West End via Gordon St to Mozley Park
- 3B, 3WH Hunter St.
- 3I Irwin St.
- 4C Edgewood Avenue-McLendon to Candler Park (Clifton)
- 4L Edgewood Avenue-McLendon to Lake Claire
- 4F Federal Prison
- 4NM North Moreland
- 6 Forrest Ave-Briarcliff Rd.- Oxford Rd to Emory. 6C continues to Decatur/Clairmont
  - 6A (Atlanta Ave.) via Capitol Ave-Atlanta Ave./Ormond to Grant Park
  - 6AM (Amsterdam) Boulevard, Boulevard (now Monroe) almost to Piedmont
  - 6G (Georgia Ave.) via Capitol Ave. and Georgia Ave. to Grant Park
- 10 Gordon St.
  - 10C Cascade Heights
  - 10G, 10S Stewart Ave.to Melrose & Sylvan
  - 10PA Peachtree Street to Ansley Park
  - 10PP to Piedmont Park
  - 10R Richland
- 11 Inman Yard via Marietta Street-Marietta Rd - Hills Park Rail Yard Bridge.
  - 11E English Avenue
  - 11L (Lakewood) via Washington Street, Milton and Lakewood to Stewart-Lakewood Center
- 13W West Fair.
- 15 "Virginia-McLynn": Memorial Drive, Moreland Avenue to Confederate
- 16L, 16N Forrest, Highland - Lanier Place (L)-Noble Park/Morningside (N)
- 16S Sylvan Hills
- 17 Edgewood Avenue, DeKalb Avenue, West Howard to Decatur
- 18S Memorial Drive, Boulevard Drive, 3rd, Hill, McDonough to Decatur
- 18C Memorial Drive, Boulevard Drive to East Lake (Candler at Glenwood)
- 19A Bankhead Ave. to Brook Ave.
- 19R River line Bankhead Ave - Hollywood Rd-Bolton Rd-Marietta Rd to Chattahoochee River
- 20 Lee St. to East Point and via Central to Hapeville

(20C to College Park, 20E to East Point only, 20H to Downtown Hapeville, 20F to Ford Plant)

- 23 West Peachtree Street to Beverly (Midtown), then via Peachtree Street to Brookhaven Country Club (23B Buckhead, 23O Oglethorpe 23W West Peachtree- Peachtree - Oglethorpe University.
- 26 Perry Homes via Marietta St. to Hollywood Rd.
- 27 Stewart Ave

== See also ==
- List of trolleybus systems in the United States
- Streetcars in Atlanta
