= River Line (Atlanta) =

Streetcar line in Atlanta, Georgia, United States

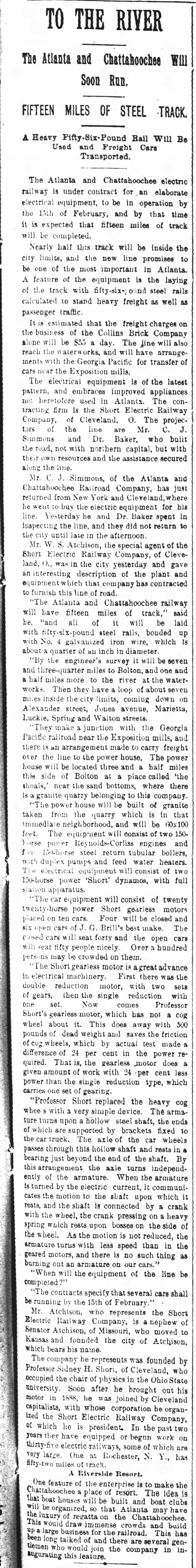
1891 Atlanta Constitution article describing plans for the River Line

The River Line was the last Atlanta streetcar line and ran from 1892 to 1949.

The line ran from Downtown Atlanta via Marietta Street, over the Jones Avenue bridge to the English Avenue neighborhood, through which they proceeded on two routes:

- one via Simpson (now Joseph E. Boone) and Ashby (now Joseph E. Lowry) to Bellwood Ave. (later Bankhead Highway, now Donald Lee Hollowell Pkwy.)
- the other via Kennedy (now Cameron M. Alexander) and English Avenue to Bellwood Ave.

Then the line ran out Bellwood Ave. to Almond Park to the Riverside community at the Chattahoochee River northwest of the city. Originally, the western extension of Bellwood Avenue was known as the "M&T Ferry Road".

It ceased operation on April 11, 1949.
