= Ice River Spring =

High discharge perennial spring on Ellesmere Island, Canada

Coordinates: 81°11′24″N 86°44′12″W

The Ice River Spring on Ellesmere Island, in Nunavut, Canada, is a high discharge perennial spring. As of 2014, it is the highest latitude perennial spring known. The spring is located at 300 m (980 ft) above sea level, on the south-facing slope of an 800 m (2,600 ft) mountain. The spring's discharge has carved a gully, and flows to the Ice River. The spring was originally discovered in 2009, and observed to gush forth all year round. Analysis of the spring water, shows that it originated from the surface, and circulated deep into the Earth before returning through the cryosphere. The spring flows year-round, even in the middle of winter when surface air temperatures reach −50 °C (−58 °F). The gully it carves out is reminiscent of gullies on Mars. The average annual air temperatures in the region is −19.7 °C (−3.5 °F), while the spring's water's average is 9 °C (48 °F). The spring discharges 520 L/s (18 cu ft/s), even though it is located in an area with permafrost over 400 m (1,300 ft) thick.
