= Tjuwaliyn (Douglas) Hot Springs Park =

Coordinates: 13.765°S 131.441°E

Tjuwaliyn (Douglas) Hot Springs Park is a park in the Northern Territory of Australia, located approximately 130 km from Katherine and 200 km from Darwin.

The outstanding features of the park are the thermal springs and wildlife along the river. The park is a popular camping area and resting spot during the dry season.

The park is owned by the Wagiman people, who jointly manage it with the Parks and Wildlife Commission of the Northern Territory.
