= Howard N. Rabinowitz =

American historian (1942–1998)

Howard N. Rabinowitz (June 19, 1942 – July 11, 1998) was a professor at the University of New Mexico and an author who wrote about African American history and the history of Albuquerque, New Mexico, where he lived.

He received his undergraduate degree from Swarthmore College and his M.A. and PhD from the University of Chicago. His thesis was titled The Search for Social Control: Race Relations in the Urban South, 1865-1890.

His work has been described as "painstakingly researched, regularly insightful, and always commonsensical".

== Bibliography ==
- "Albuquerque; City at the Crossroads" in Sunbelt Cities: Politics and Growth since World War II, University of Texas Press (2014)
- "More than the Woodward thesis: assessing The strange career of Jim Crow" (chapter) by Howard N. Rabinowitz in C. Vann Woodward: A Southern Historian and His Critics (1997)
- Race, Ethnicity, and Urbanization: Selected Essays by Howard N. Rabinowitz, University of Missouri Press (1994)
- The First New South, 1865-1920 by Howard N. Rabinowitz, Harlan Davidson (1992)
- Southern Black leaders of the Reconstruction era by Howard N. Rabinowitz, University of Illinois Press (1982)
- Race relations in the Urban South, 1865-1890 by Howard N. Rabinowitz, Oxford University Press (1978)
- "From Exclusion to Segregation: SouthernRace Relations, 1865-1890" by Howard N. Rabinowitz, The Journal of American History Vol. 63, No. 2 (September 1976), pages 325-350
- "The Conflict Between Blacks and the Police in the Urban South, 1865 - 1900" by Howard N. Rabinowitz (November 1976)
