= Metropolitan Street Railroad =

Streetcar system in Atlanta (1882–1892)

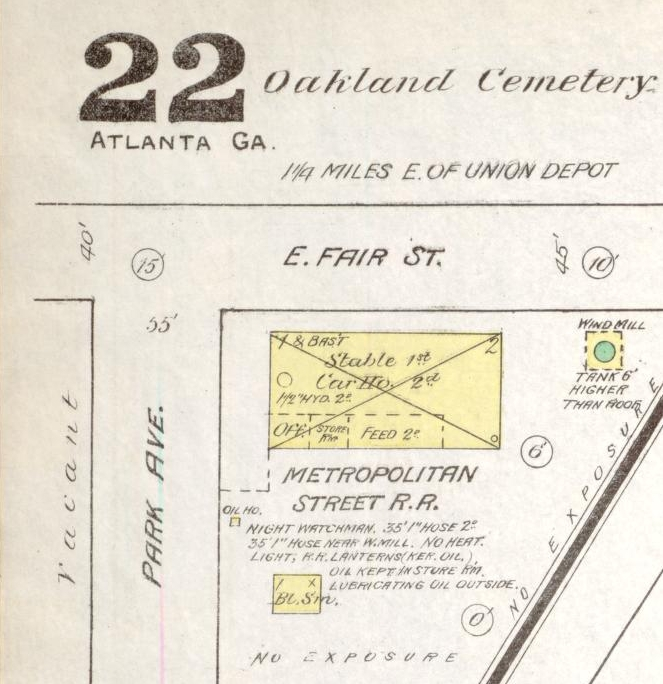
Metropolitan stable and car house

The Metropolitan Street Railroad was an early streetcar company in Atlanta.

The horsecar line was organized in 1882 by Lemuel Grant, Jesse W. Rankin, William L. Abbott, William A. Haygood, and Jacob Haas. The goal was to serve the southeast side of town. It operated two lines:

- Pryor Street Line – south from Union Station on Pryor to Garnett St, to Pulliam St to Clark St, to Washington St, terminating at Crumley Street in the Washington-Rawson neighborhood, now demolished. Later extended out Washington to Georgia Avenue (the north east corner of today's Turner Field) and then east to Grant Park.
- Park Line – south on Pryor to Hunter St (MLK), to Fraser St to Fair St (Memorial Dr), thence east past Oakland Cemetery to the newly laid out Park Ave then south to Grant Park.

The original company did not do well financially and was sold in 1888 to Aaron Haas and W.H. Patterson. They laid new rail along all routes and began running dummies (steam driven engines). Their stables and car-house were on the southeast corner of Fair (now Memorial) and Park Ave, the current location of the Oakland Park lofts.

After passing through receivership, all was purchased by the Atlanta Consolidated Street Railway in 1892.

== See also ==
- Timeline of mass transit in Atlanta
