= Atlanta Street Railway =

The Atlanta Street Railway was the first streetcar system in Atlanta.

Originally chartered by the state of Georgia on February 23, 1866, by George Hillyer, John Westmoreland and John Thrasher soon after the city put such onerous demands on the company – including paving large chunks of the then totally unpaved town – that it lay dormant for years.

On January 1, 1869, the city reduced the bulk of these demands and in April 1871, Richard Peters and George Adair bought out the charter and, months later, on September 1, 1871, opened the first section connecting Five Points to the West End – a route that passed by both of their homes.

In the years to follow they established more of these cast iron rail lines with cars pulled by mules and horses:

- March 30, 1873 – Taylor Hill (high spot one block south of the Georgia Dome) line to the near west side which failed the next year
- May 26, 1873 – Washington St down McDonough St (now Capitol Ave)
- 1874 – Peachtree to Pine. Later to Ponce and Ponce Springs

The car and animal shed was located near Five Points on both sides of Line St (now Edgewood) at Ivy (Peachtree Center Ave). In 1878, Adair sold his interests to Peters giving him 80% control and with Peters's death in 1889 control went to his son Edward Peters. At that time the line owned 15 miles (24 km) of track, fifty streetcars and 200 horses and mules.

In 1891 the company was absorbed into the Atlanta Consolidated Street Railway.

== See also ==
- Streetcars in Atlanta
- Timeline of mass transit in Atlanta
