= Morningside/Lenox Park =

Neighborhood of Atlanta, Georgia

Coordinates: 33.797519°N 84.358295°W

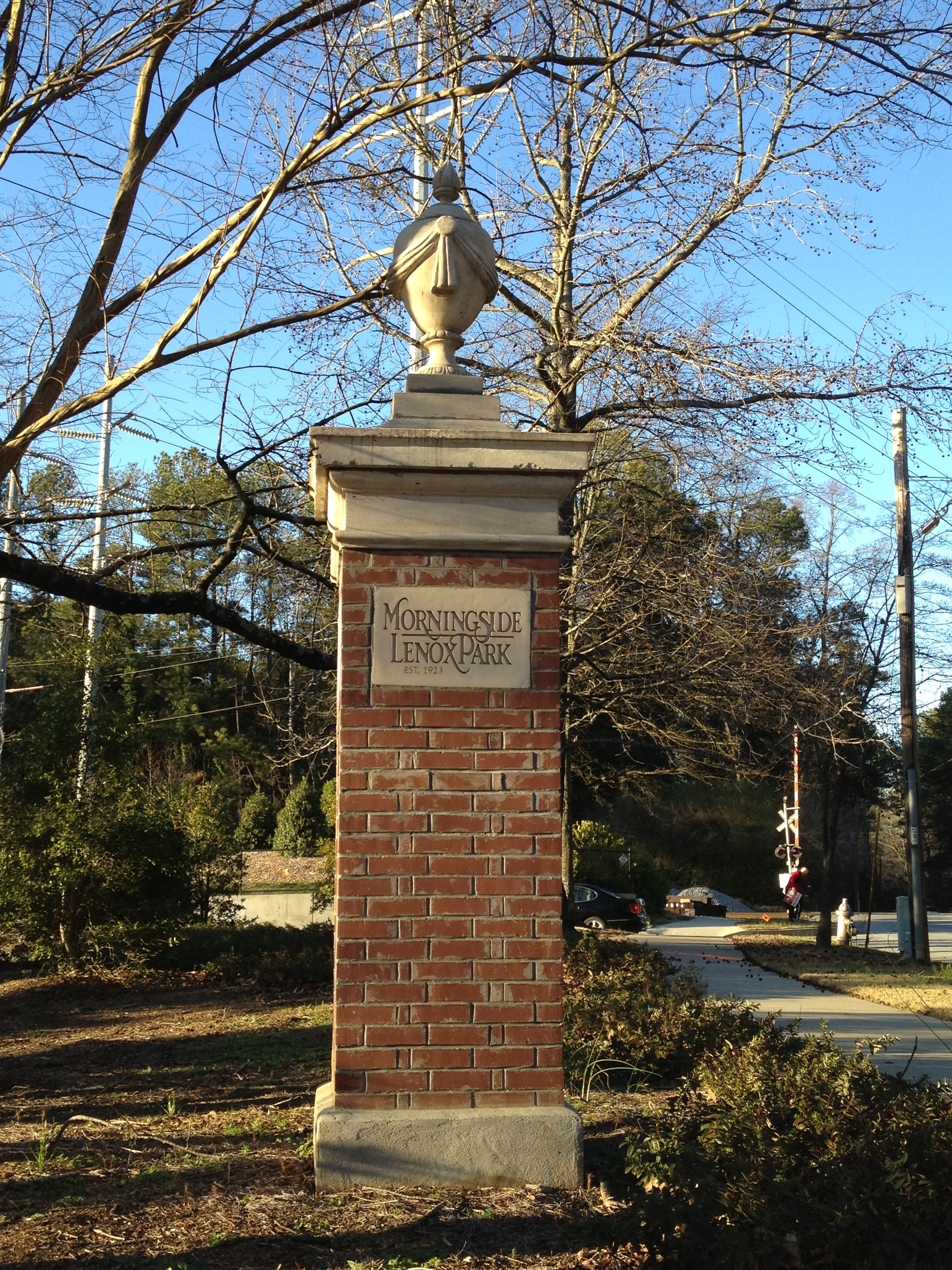
Column marking the neighborhood's border

Morningside/Lenox Park is an intown neighborhood in Atlanta, Georgia founded in 1923. It is located north of Virginia-Highland, east of Ansley Park and west of Druid Hills. Approximately 3,500 households comprise the neighborhood that includes the original subdivisions of Morningside, Lenox Park, University Park, Noble Park, Johnson Estates, and Hylan Park.

== History ==
The area that became Atlanta was once home to the Muscogee indigenous people. Following the Indian Removal Act in 1832, the Creek National Council signed the Treaty of Cusseta, ceding their remaining lands east of the Mississippi to the U.S., and accepting relocation to the Indian Territory. Most of Atlanta's first settlers were from Northeast Georgia, though others came from the Carolinas and Virginia. Some settled in Easton, a farming community at the present intersection of Piedmont Avenue and Monroe Drive. Industrious farmers whose land lay along major creeks established water-powered saw and grist mills. Easton farmers ginned their cotton and ground their corn at Walker's Mill, across from today's Ansley Mall.

In winter 1868, Joel Mable, a devout Scottish Presbyterian, organized the Union Sunday School in the Rock Spring School House. The school was located near the current intersection of Morningside Drive and East Rock Springs Road. Two years later, 27 members organized Rock Spring Presbyterian Church. Their names - Cheshire, Reeder, Luckie, Plaster and others - are familiar to this century's motorists. The first church, a white frame building without a steeple, was built in 1871 on the church's current site at Piedmont Avenue and Rock Springs Road.

In 1876, Easton residents began using the Airline Belle, a steam train that ran between Atlanta and Toccoa for 42 years. Commuters boarded the train at a depot near what is today Ansley Mall. By 1888, Easton was 100 residents strong. By 1900, a number of Eastoners commuted to Atlanta by train.

The new century brought many changes. Easton's post office closed in 1904. By 1911, the neighborhoods of today's Ansley Park and Virginia-Highland were under development. That same year, Plaster Bridge Road in front of Walker's Mill was paved; the road was renamed Piedmont Avenue in 1917.

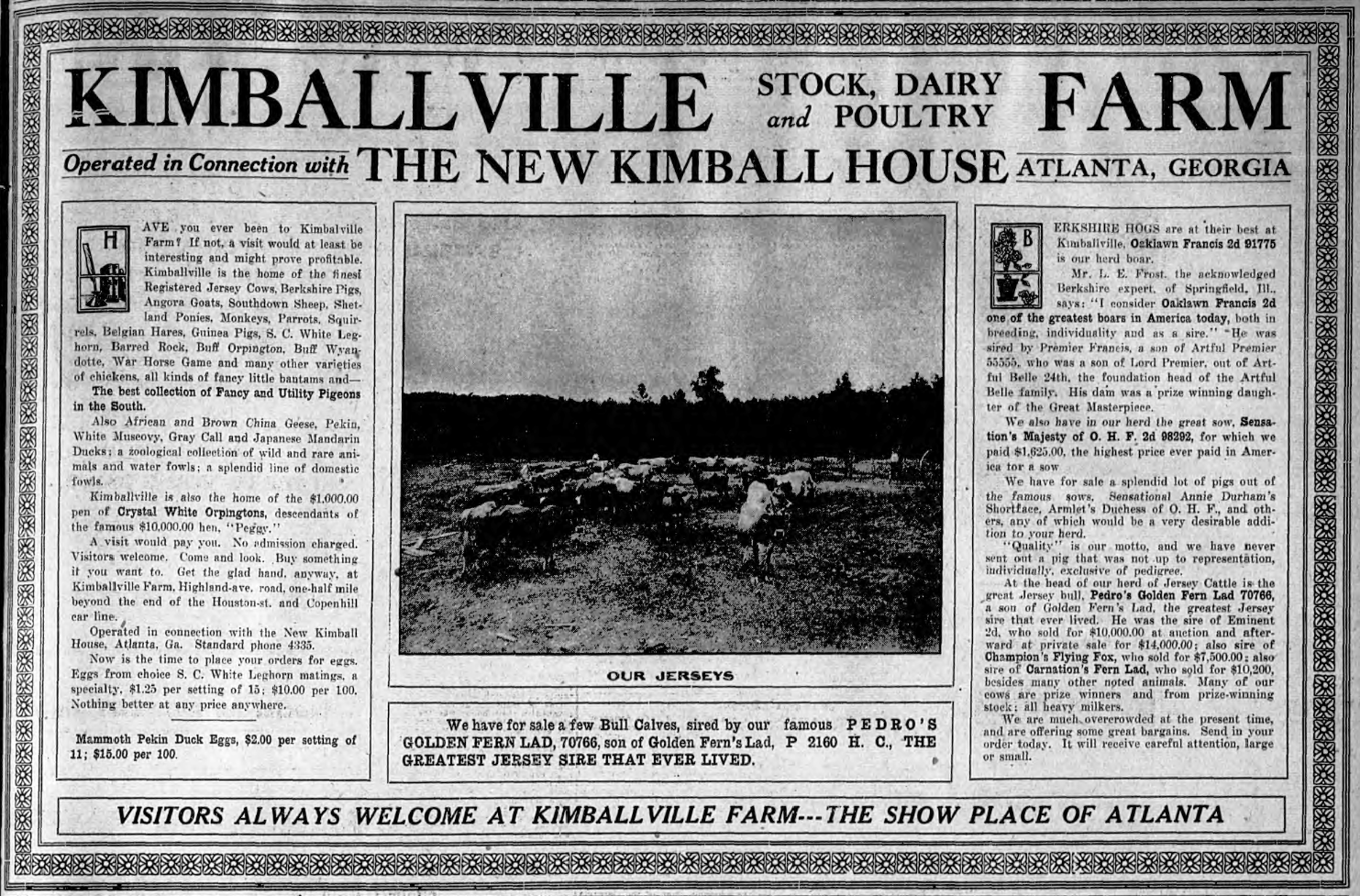
Newspaper ad for Kimballville Farms, 1909

Kimballville Farm was a large farm in the area known for its modern technology and prime livestock. Visitors were invited to come out from Atlanta and spend a leisurely day on the farm and buy livestock or farm products.

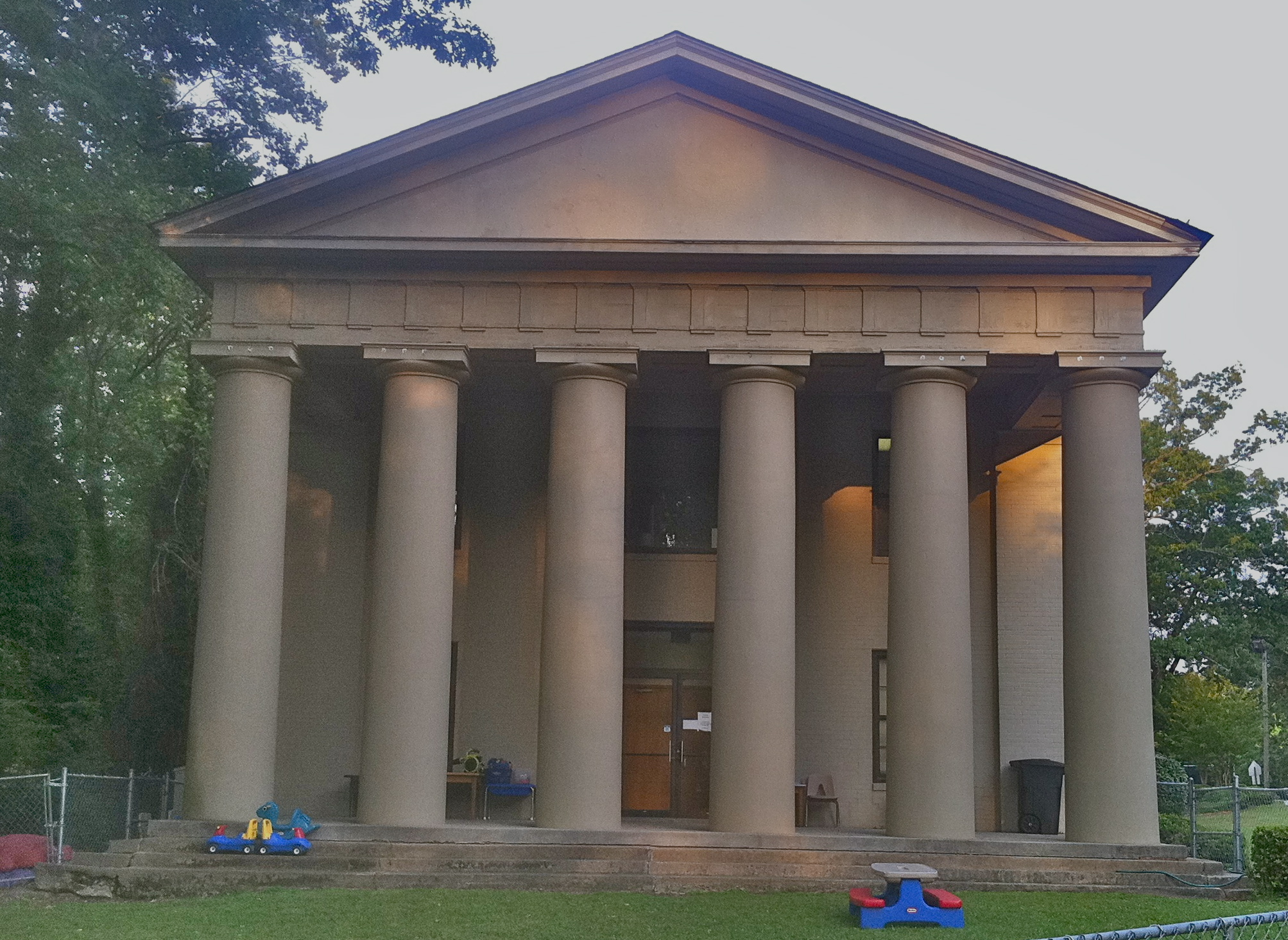
Former Arlington Hall of Lanier University, now the Canterbury School

Charles Lewis Fowler, a Baptist minister, founded Lanier University on University Drive the same year. The University Park subdivision was developed around the university in 1921, and University Drive is also a reminder of that time. But financial problems plagued the school; in 1921 the property was sold to the Ku Klux Klan, which owned it for a year. Ironically, the owners sold it to a Jewish group, and the structure is now part of the Congregation Shearith Israel synagogue.

Two years later, real estate agents James R. Smith and M.S. Rankin build eight homes establishing Morningside Lenox Park. Advertisements stressed a 70-foot (21 m) wide paved street in front of homes with Murphy beds and a servants' toilet in the basement. Morningside was touted as a "new type of suburb." Commuters traveled to and from their homes by streetcar and, if they were fortunate enough, by car.

The new development prospered after the city annexed the area in 1925.

"The section known as Morningside, one of the newest subdivisions around Atlanta, was experiencing a boom. Many new homes had already been built and many others were under construction. The streetcar line and pavement were being extended out North Highland Avenue from Virginia Avenue to Lanier Place. Kimballville Farm, the fields east of Highland Avenue and the woods west of Highland, were being swiftly replaced by new homes and these were being occupied by young families of industrious, hopeful and friendly people." -Mini-history of Haygood Memorial United Methodist Church (1976)

Also in 1925, developer Byron C. Kistner built a row of shops on North Highland. Original tenants included Shackleford's Pharmacy, Henry's Dry Cleaning, Rogers Brothers Grocery and an A&P. In 1927, construction began on Morningside Shopping Center, the storefront strip on Piedmont just north of Monroe Drive.

The growing neighborhood acquired a school when Morningside Elementary opened in 1929. Originally, the school had six classrooms on the lower floor of the western side of the current building. Enrollment grew, and a new building was commissioned and completed in 1935, providing work for the unemployed during the Depression.

Development of Noble Park, Johnson Estates, and Hylan Park began in 1930. A year later Lenox Park opened (not to be confused with the Lenox Park area built in the 1980s only 5 miles further north), featuring model homes with names like "The Barclay", "The Sussex" and "The Chateau". Atlanta architects Ivey and Crook designed the homes in Lenox Park.

In 1934, the Morningside Civic League beautified the neighborhood by planting crepe myrtles and dogwoods. Postwar housing shortages, coupled with FHA and VA loans, spurred more development after World War II. Residents of heavily Jewish Washington-Rawson and Summerhill neighborhoods south of the State Capitol relocated to northeast Atlanta including Morningside - eventually those old Jewish neighborhoods were demolished to make way for the Downtown Connector freeway and what is now Turner Field and its massive parking lots.

The neighborhood faced a similar threat in the 1960s. In 1965, the Morningside Lenox Park Association (MLPA) was incorporated to fight plans to build I-485 through the neighborhood. By the late '60s, the state had bought property and demolished several homes for road right-of-way. The MLPA banded together with other east Atlanta neighborhoods to block the highway. Thanks to their pressure, the state dropped its plans for I-485 in 1973. The following year, Atlanta enacted a new city charter setting up 24 Neighborhood Planning Units (NPUs) to give residents more say in their communities.

In 1985, residents renamed Cumberland-Sherwood Park to honor the late Sidney Marcus, a Morningside resident and state representative who helped block the I-485 project. Mr. Marcus also helped secure the land for the park, which the state had cleared to build the highway.

In the late 1980s, an MLPA committee led by David Robertson undertook a "monumental" project on behalf of their neighborhood. They decided to duplicate the Lenox Park marker at 878 Plymouth Road. Built in the 1920s, it was the only monument that remained intact. The committee raised enough funds to repair six existing markers and build 12 new ones. As the Winter 1989 MLPA Newsletter noted: "The new monuments will help define and unify the Morningside-Lenox Park area and will help focus attention on intown residential living and show our 'pride of place.' A unified look will help keep the freeways out of MLPA and show D.O.T. we are here to stay."

The deterioration of Cheshire Bridge Road into a sort of red-light district concerned residents in the late 20th century, with a 1999 city report stating "the Cheshire Bridge Road corridor continues to fail to reach its potential. While thriving residential neighborhoods, an eclectic business mix and many popular establishments mark the area, the corridor remains a seedy and undesirable locale in the collective Atlanta psyche due, in part, to the proliferation of adult businesses and the unkempt nature of the corridor." In 2005 the city banned new adult businesses on Cheshire Bridge, but existing ones were allowed to stay. In 2013, councilman Alex Wan introduced legislation to remove existing adult businesses from Cheshire Bridge by 2018, but this was not passed, opposed by a mix of gays, strippers and Atlanta's real estate interests – including Scott Selig. Some in the gay community wondered if Cheshire Bridge were "sanitized", "where would people go for sexual expression"? Matthew Cardinale, the editor and publisher of Atlanta Progressive News, and resident of the Road, decried "the ongoing project of gentrification, homogenization, sterilization and capitalization of a historic neighborhood," Atlanta's "red-light district ".

== Education ==
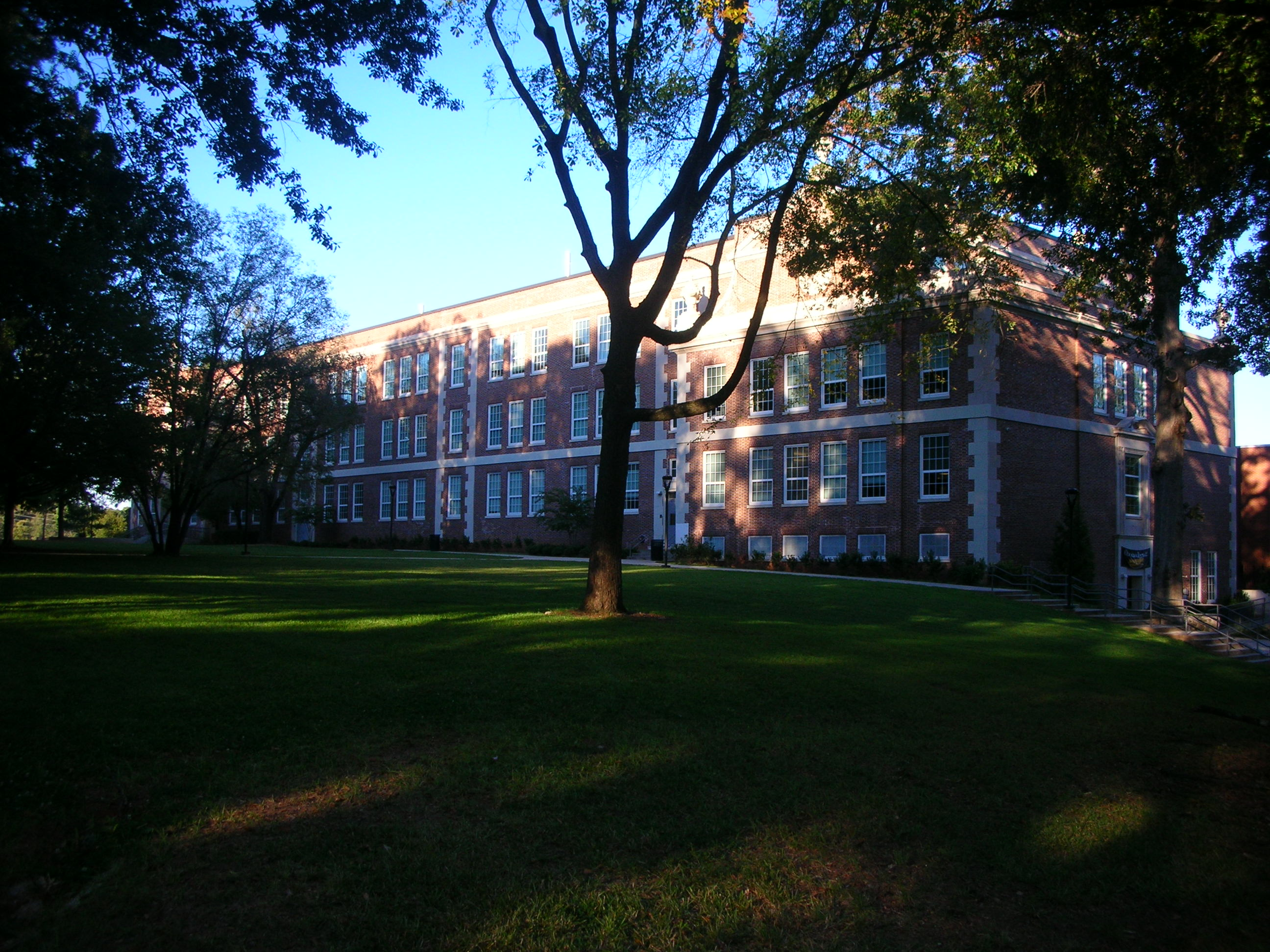
Henry W. Grady High School

The neighborhood is served by the following Atlanta Public Schools campuses:

- Morningside Elementary School
- Inman Middle School
- Midtown High School

The neighborhood is served by the following Atlanta Preschools campuses:

- International Preschools at Virginia Highland
- Intown Montessori

== Parks and trails ==
In addition to several local parks, the Eastside Trail, part of the BeltLine ring of parks and trails around the central city, borders the neighborhood on the west.

== Notable people ==
- Caleb Wiley, professional soccer player
