= Airline Belle =

Overview
- Service type: Inter-city rail
- Status: Discontinued
- Locale: Georgia
- First service: 1879
- Last service: 1931
- Former operator(s): Atlanta and Charlotte Air Line Railway (1879-1894); Southern Railway (1894-1931)

Route
- Termini: Atlanta, Georgia; Toccoa, Georgia
- Stops: 39
- Distance travelled: 93 mi (150 km)

The Airline Belle or Air-line Belle was a steam passenger train running between Atlanta and Toccoa, Georgia, on the Atlanta and Charlotte Air Line Railway (later the Southern Railway) between 1879 and 1931. Its route was 93 miles (150 km) long with 39 stops including (not all in order):

== 39 stops ==
- Terminal Station (Atlanta)
- Easton, a settlement located in today's Ansley Park neighborhood of Atlanta
- Armour Station, mile 6.1
- Ottley, mile 9.8
- Goodwin's Crossing (or "Goodwin's" or "Goodwin Station"), in today's Brookhaven area, mile 11
- Roswell Junction, mile 13
- Doraville, mile 15
- Chamblee
- Norcross, mile 19
- Duluth, mile 25
- Suwanee, mile 31
- Buford, mile 38
- Flowery Branch, mile 44
- Odell's, mile 47
- Gainesville, mile 53
- White Sulphur Springs, mile 60
- Lula, mile 65
- Bellton, mile 66
- Rabun Cap Junction, mile 78
- Mt. Airy, mile 80
- Ayersville, mile 86
- Carolina
- Mechanicsville (Gwinnett County)
- Beaver Dam
- Carolina
- Sugar Hill
- Oakwood
- Cagle
- Raoul
- New Switzerland
- Alto
- Toccoa, mile 93
