= Orelia Key Bell =

American poet and artist (1864–1959)

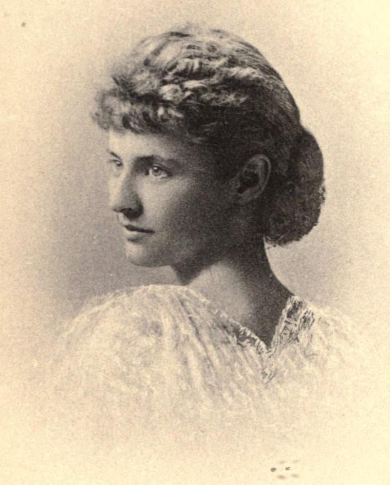
- Orelia Key Bell, ca. 1895
- Born: April 8, 1864; Atlanta, Georgia, C.S.
- Died: June 2, 1959; Pasadena, California, U.S.
- Resting place: Oakland Cemetery, Atlanta
- Known for: Transcribing her poems in gold leaf in china plate
- Notable work: Poems of Orelia Key Bell (1895)
- Partner: Ida Jane Ash

Orelia Key Bell (April 8, 1864 – June 2, 1959) was an American poet and author whose work includes "Millennium Hymn" (1893) and "Poems" (1895). She lived for more than 50 years with her companion, Ida Jane Ash (1874–1948), first in Atlanta and then California, and they are buried alongside each other in the Atlanta's Historic Oakland Cemetery.

== Early life ==
Orelia Key Bell was born in Atlanta, Georgia, on April 8, 1864, to Colonel Marcus Aurelius Bell (1828–1885) and Mary Jane Hulsey (1837–1901), in the Bell mansion, a stately Southern home in the heart of the city built in 1860. The house became historic soon after Bell's birth, as the headquarters of General William Sherman's engineering corps led by Captain Orlando M. Poe, and the room in which she was born and spent the first three months of her life was that used by General Sherman as a stable for his favorite colt. The house was made of "plaster-covered stone marbleized in shades of blue, yellow, and red" and thus nicknamed the "Calico House". The house was demolished in 1925.

== Career ==
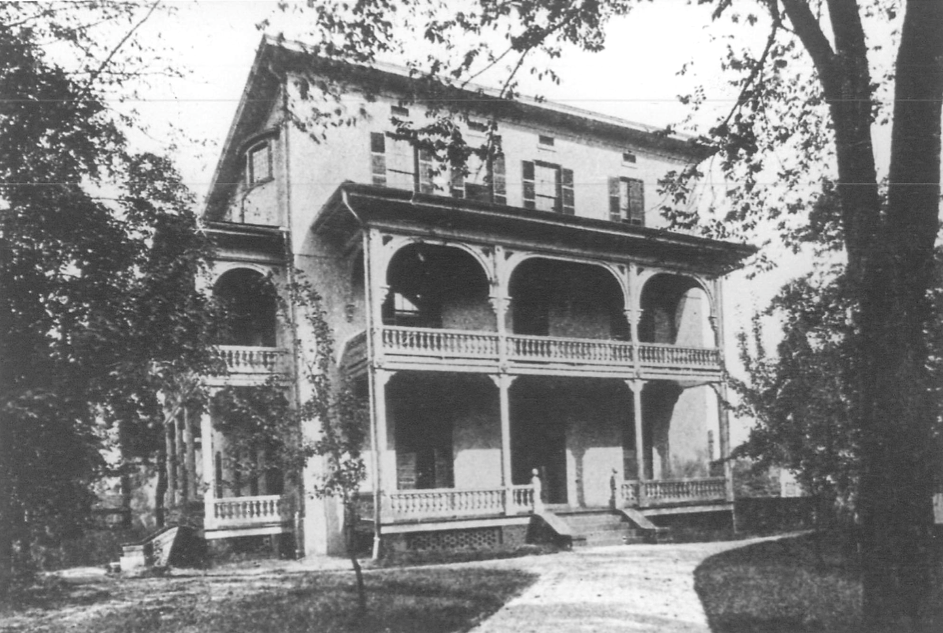
The Calico House

Both sides of Bell's family were from the gentry, and she was very thoroughly educated. Even when her family lost their financial security she managed to support herself and reach the fame through her poetry.

Her warmest recognition from the press came from Richard Watson Gilder of The Century Magazine, Page M. Baker of the New Orleans Times-Democrat, Charles Anderson Dana of the New York Sun, Miriam Leslie, Henry W. Grady, and Thaddeus E. Horton, and her own home paper, The Atlanta Journal-Constitution. Her poem "Maid and Matron" was used by actress Hortense Rhéa during her performances.

Bell was friends with Sue Harper Mims, wife of Atlanta Mayor Livingston Mims. Sue Harper Mims was an influential teacher and lecturer in the early Christian Science movement in the South and founder of the First Church of Christ, Scientist, Atlanta. To her Bell owed the inspiration of her most enduring work, the International Series of Christian Science Hymns. "Millennium Hymn", published in the February 1893 issue of The Christian Science Journal, is one of them.

In 1942 she collaborated with British poet Alfred Noyes to publish a "patriotic leaflet". Her poem, "The Tocsin Sounds" is "dedicated to President Franklin D. Roosevelt as Commander in Chief".

Later in life, she developed the art of transcribing her poems in gold leaf on porcelain. Several works are exhibited at the Atlanta Historical Society, among other venues. She was awarded a bronze medal at the Cotton States and International Exposition in Atlanta.

She was an early active member of Pasadena's Browning Society, a poetry appreciation group.

== Ida Ash ==
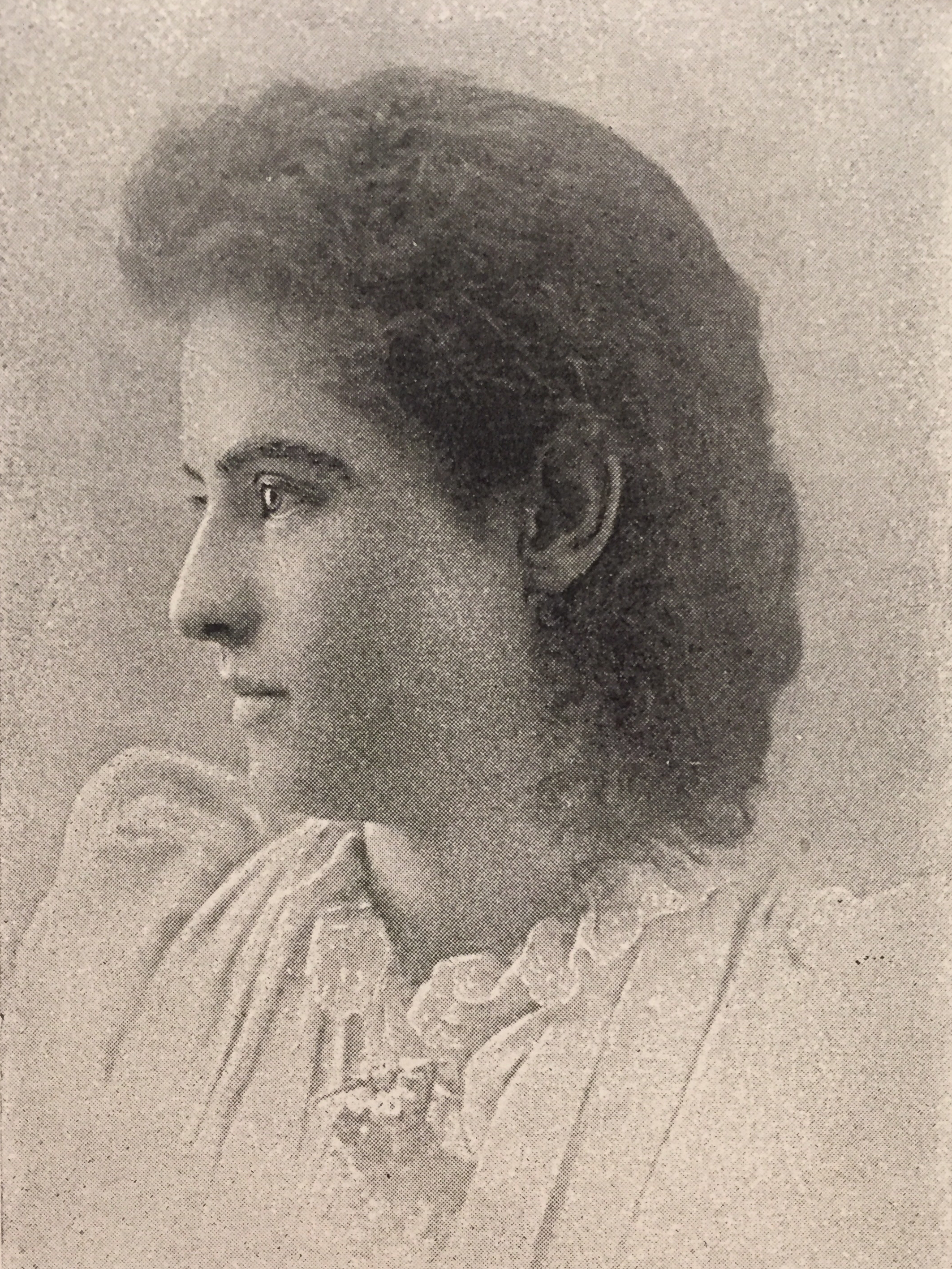
Orelia Key Bell in 1893 book A Woman of the Century

In 1895 Bell published Poems of Orelia Key Bell, and the volume is dedicated, among others, to "Ida Ash, whose affection and encouragement have been among the chief sources of my inspiration".

One poem, "Ida Ash", is under the section "The Heavenly Muse", and Ash is also named in the poem "At Mount Enota's Laurel'd Base" under the section "Melodies in Minor Key":

=== Ida Ash ===
HOW did she come to me ? –or was it I
Who came to her? –or did we come together
Of one accord? I know nor whence nor whither
We twain were journeying was it yesterday,
Or some dim preexistence? –Destiny,
With iron tread –or Chance, blown like a feather–
Or clash of wandering stars or freak of weather,
That brought our hands to clasp in sympathy,
Our eyes to meet in music, and our souls
To leap en rapport? –Nay! as well divine
Which of two intermelting dewdrops rolls
First into the other. Whyfore seek a sign?
I only know, 'twas night: a voice: a flash
Of nereid eyes –then day– and Ida Ash.

=== At Mount Enota's Laurel'd Base ===
AT Mount Enota's laurel'd base,
Where Hiawassee's waters flash,
'Twas there I met a mountain grace,
Beautiful Ida Ash.

As o'er the rocks, nereidianly,
She moved, with lissom step and proud,
Her eyes gleam'd like the Gemini
Beneath a shifting summer cloud.

The east-wind left its mourning cave
To nestle, dove-like, in her locks;
Tamed by her step, each madcap wave
Caress'd the conscious rocks.

The skylarks left their aery thrones
Amidst the serenading stars,
To catch her accent's Orphean tones
And beat its elegiac bars.

Ah, I have sigh'd to rest me, sang
She from II Trovatore; and thro'
A poet's heart the echo rang,
Ah, I have sigh'd to rest me, too.

Sweet Ida Ash! life's hills are steep,
And Art a glad toil at its best;
Then rest thou in my heart, and I
Sweetly in thine will rest.

Teach me to sing as thou dost live,
A simple life of love and duty;
Then I at least to Art may give
One song of everlasting beauty.

On October 12, 1895, at the closing session of the Professional Work of Women National Council's Work, a selection of poems by Bell were recited by Ash and by her pupils, Lucille Atkinson and Mamie Tolbert. A newspaper noted that Bell's "popularity in the literary world was evident from the representative number of literary people present who heard with deep appreciation the delicate expressions of her poetic mind".

== Personal life ==
Orelia Key Bell never married and but lived with Ida Jane Ash. Newspapers tagged Ash as a lifelong friend and amanuensis. They moved to Pasadena prior to World War I and later lived at 2533 Greenbriar Lane, Costa Mesa, California. Bell died on June 2, 1959, and is buried at Oakland Cemetery in the Bell family plot alongside Ash.
