= Evan Howell =

American military officer (1839–1905)

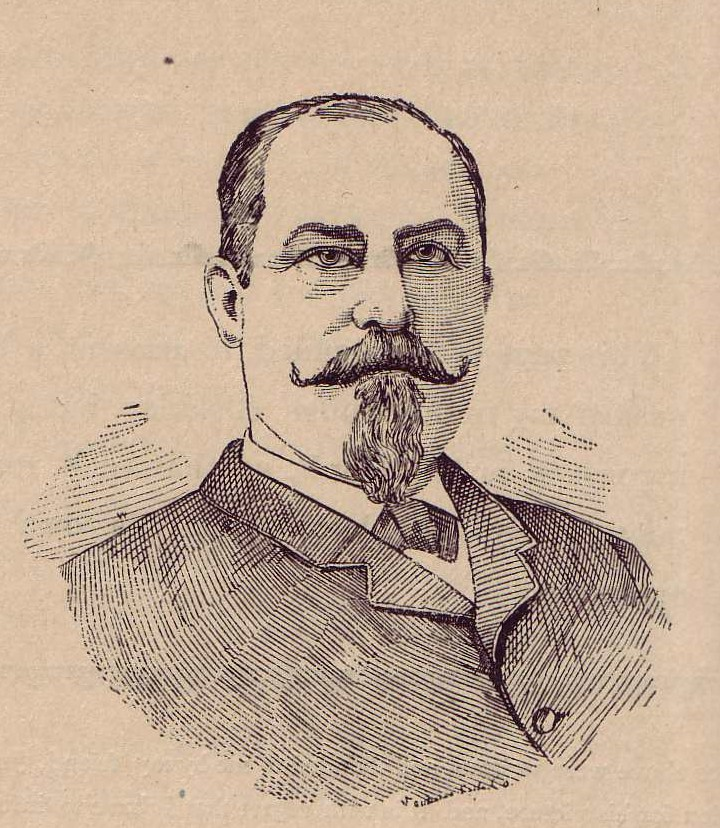

36th Mayor of Atlanta
- In office January 1903 – January 1905
- Preceded by: Livingston Mims
- Succeeded by: James G. Woodward

Personal details
- Born: Evan Park Howell; December 10, 1839 Warsaw, Georgia, US
- Died: August 6, 1905 (aged 65) Atlanta, Georgia, US
- Resting place: Westview Cemetery, Atlanta, Georgia
- Spouse: Julia Adelaide Erwin
- Education: Georgia Military Institute

Military service
- Allegiance: Confederate States
- Branch/service: Confederate States Army
- Rank: Captain
- Unit: 1st Georgia Infantry; Georgia Light Artillery
- Battles/wars: American Civil War

Evan Park Howell (December 10, 1839 – August 6, 1905) was an American politician and early telegraph operator, as well as an officer in the Confederate Army during the American Civil War.

== Early years and education ==
Evan Howell was born on December 10, 1839, to Effie Howell (née Park) and Atlanta pioneer Clark Howell, Sr. in Warsaw, Georgia (then in Forsyth County, now Fulton County) on December 10, 1839. He became a runner and pupil of Atlanta's first telegraph operator, D.U. Sloan, at the age of twelve. In 1855, he attended Georgia Military Institute in Marietta. He read law in Sandersville, and briefly practiced law in Atlanta before the outbreak of war.

== Military service ==
In 1861, he joined the infantry, enlisting in Georgia's First Regiment. Within 2 years, Howell was promoted to first lieutenant. He fought under Stonewall Jackson in Virginia, and then was sent west, where he fought in the Battle of Chickamauga and the Atlanta campaign, in which he defended the city as a captain of artillery. He ended the war in Hardee's Corps as captain of Howell's Battery, Georgia Light Artillery.

== Business and political career ==
Upon his return, he farmed for two years, clearing and selling lumber on his father's land near Atlanta. Then for a year he was a reporter, then city editor, of Atlanta's Daily Intelligencer. In 1869, he returned to practicing law and served in a number of political positions including member of city council, member of the state Senate, and solicitor-general of the Atlanta circuit. One of his law clients was The Atlanta Constitution, where he learned E.Y. Clarke was willing to sell his one half interest in the paper. In 1876, Howell purchased the 50% interest in The Constitution and became its editor-in-chief. For the next 25 years, the paper was owned by Howell and the managing partner, William Hemphill. Both Hemphill, and later Howell, would go on to serve as Mayor of Atlanta.

With Richard Peters, Samuel M. Inman, Lemuel Grant, and James W. English, he purchased the buildings on the site of the International Cotton Exposition of 1881 and made it the Exposition Cotton Mills, which were successful for many years.

While editor of the Constitution in 1895, he sent out transcripts of Booker T. Washington's separate as the fingers speech across the country.

He served on the Atlanta City Council numerous times, and served as mayor shortly before his death there on August 6, 1905, aged 65, in Atlanta. His son Clark Howell took up his mantle at the Constitution.

Preceded by Livingston Mims	Mayor of Atlanta; January 1903 – January 1905	Succeeded by James G. Woodward
