= Butler Chapel =

- Location: Buies Creek, North Carolina
- Owner: Campbell University Inc
- Capacity: 300 Seats

Construction
- Groundbreaking: May 7, 2008
- Opened: August 25, 2009
- Cost: $7.8 million

Tenant
- Campbell University Divinity School

Butler Chapel is a chapel located in Campbell University in Buies Creek, North Carolina. It is the first and only chapel on Campbell University's campus.

Completed in 2009, it is named after its initial benefactors, alumni Anna and Robert Butler. The chapel functions to educate divinity students, as a place of worship, and as university offices.

== Interior ==
The chapel has two stained glass windows: the Resurrection and Creation window. Along the sides of the chapel are clear glass windows.

The chapel's organ was built by the Cornel Zimmer Organ Company. It has 20 sets of pipes and 1,198 individual pipes. The chapel also houses a Steinway concert grand piano.

The adjacent Bell Tower is the tallest point on campus at approximately 69 ft tall. It houses 24 bronze carillon bells.
