= First Church of Christ, Scientist (Atlanta) =

Christian Science building in Georgia, US

Coordinates: 33.788874°N 84.383508°W

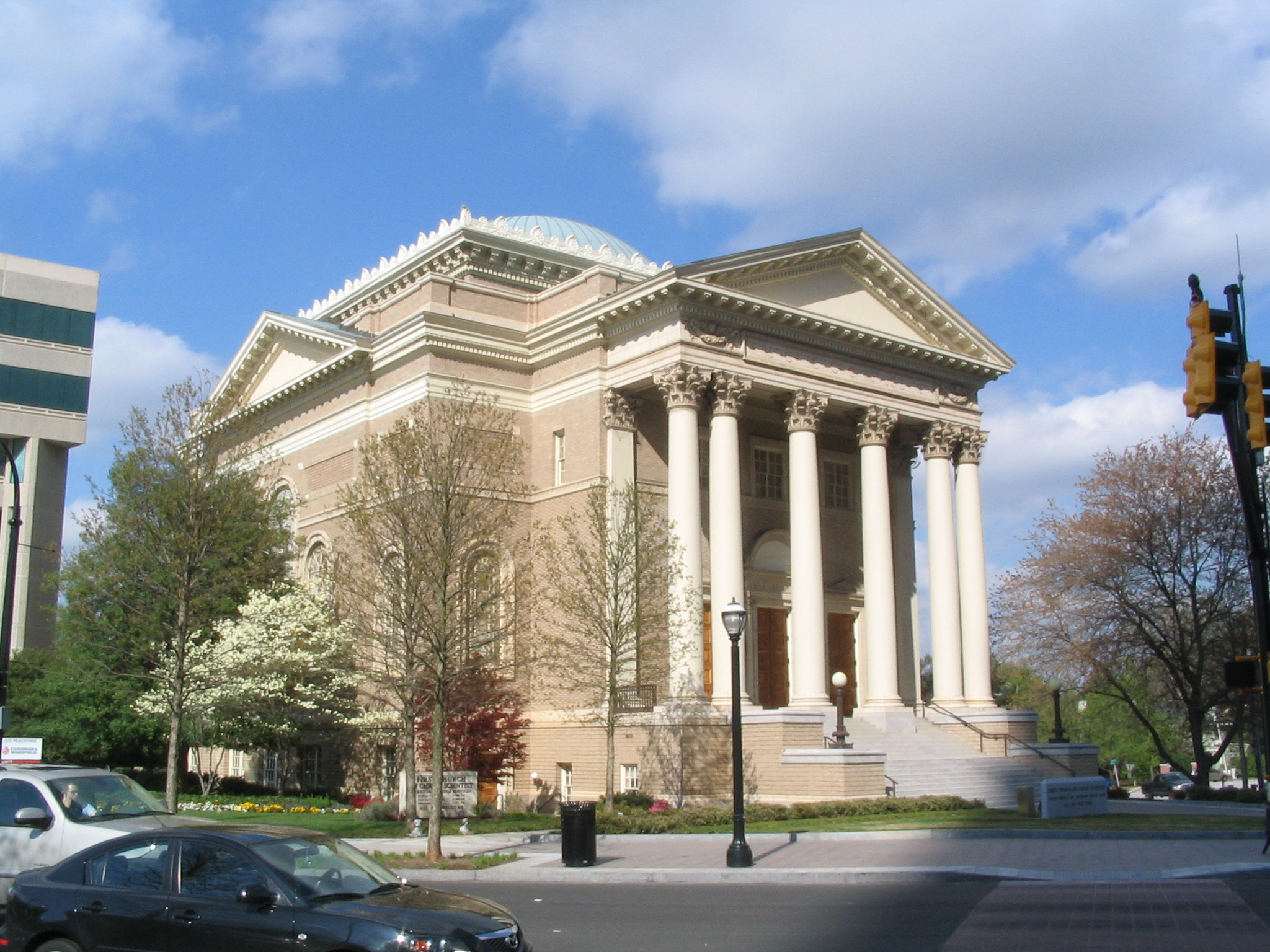
- The church in 2009
- Interactive map of the First Church of Christ, Scientist area

General information
- Architectural style: Greek Revival
- Location: Atlanta, Georgia, United States
- Construction started: 1913
- Completed: 1914
- Client: First Church of Christ, Scientist

Design and construction
- Architect: Arthur Neal Robinson

First Church of Christ, Scientist is the main congregation for Atlanta, Georgia’s Christian Science community. Its historic Greek Revival church edifice is located on the corner of Fifteenth Street, N.E., and Peachtree Street in the city's Midtown section and is a contributing property in the Ansley Park Historic District.

== History ==
Christian Science came to Georgia in 1886 through Julia S. Bartlett, who reportedly healed Atlanta resident Sue Harper Mims from a longstanding illness of 15 years. Mims became an ardent student of Christian Science, organizing church meetings at her residence, and eventually becoming a well-known practitioner and lecturer.

As the Atlanta Christian Science congregation grew, they first held services in a building at 17 West Baker Street, then moved to the current edifice which opened in 1914. The architect of the new building, Arthur Neal Robinson of Edward Emmett Dougherty's firm, was also a member of the church. According to the church's website, it was the first air-conditioned building in Atlanta, having used a primitive system involving fans blowing over blocks of ice placed in the passages beneath the floor of the main auditorium.
