= Easton, Georgia =

Coordinates: 33.797°N 84.369°W

Easton was a farming community located at the crossroads of Plaster Bridge Road (now Piedmont Road) and Monroe Drive, a location where today, three intown neighborhoods of Atlanta come together: Morningside-Lenox Park, Piedmont Heights and Ansley Park. Farmers took their cotton and corn to Walker's Mill, across from what is now Ansley Mall.

Some milestones in Easton's existence:

- 1876: train started stopping in Easton; from 1879-1931 the Airline Belle line ran between Atlanta Terminal Station and Toccoa, Georgia
- 1888: population reaches 100
- 1904: post office closes
- 1911: development begins in Ansley Park and Virginia Highland
- 1911: Plaster Bridge Road paved
- 1917: Plaster Bridge Road is renamed Piedmont Road
