= New Switzerland =

New Switzerland may refer to:

- New Switzerland, Georgia, U.S.
- Highland, Illinois, U.S., formerly New Switzerland
- A fictional colony in the East Indies; setting of The Swiss Family Robinson and The Castaways of the Flag
