= Kimballville Farm =

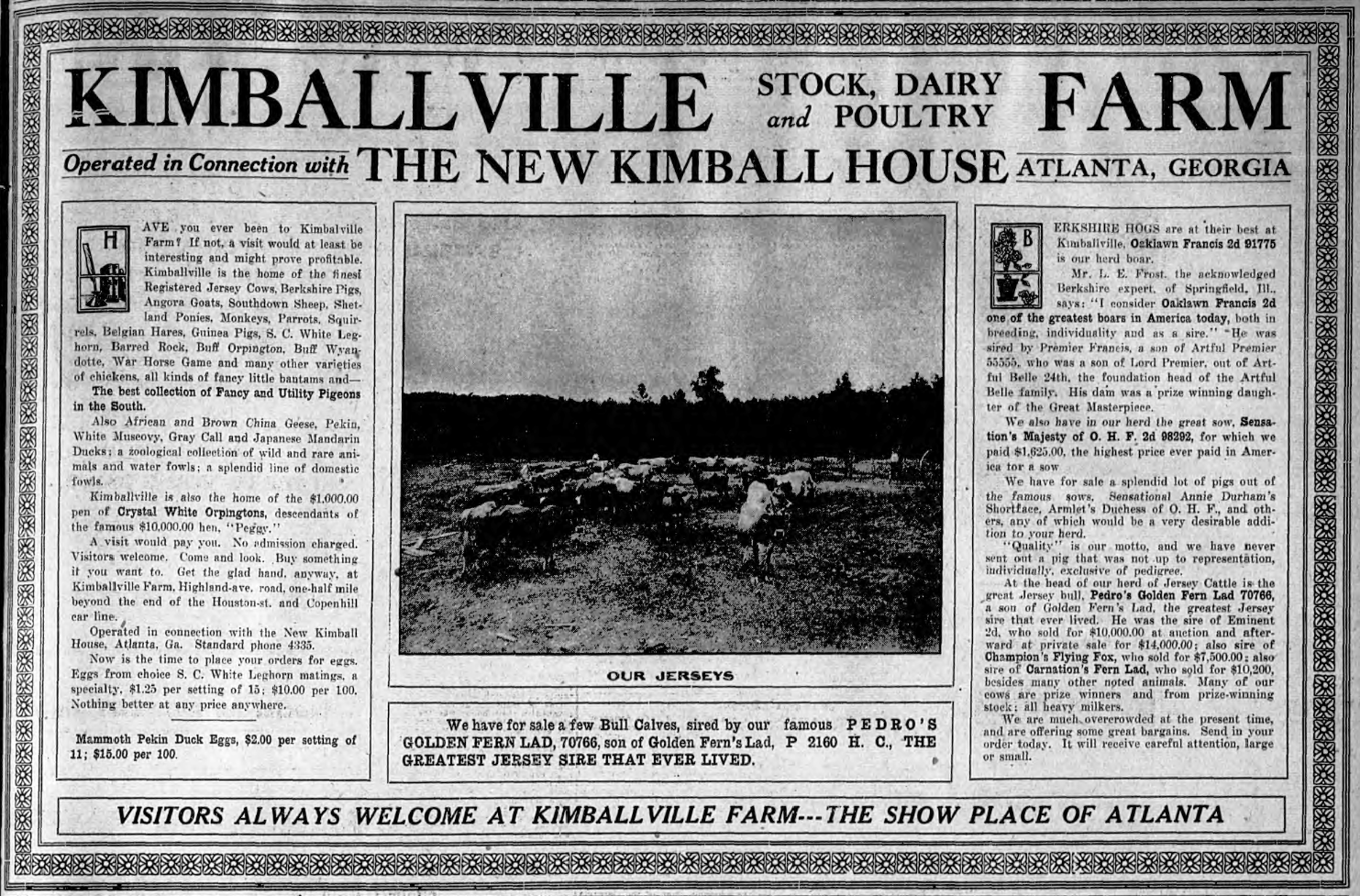
Newspaper ad for Kimball Farms, 1909

Kimballville Farm was a large farm located east of North Highland Avenue in what is today the Morningside-Lenox Park neighborhood of Atlanta, Georgia. It was renowned for its large collection of "the finest live stock" and "the most modern equipment". There is a road in the area, Zimmer Avenue, named after the owner as of 1909, Mr. Zimmer. The farm was a landmark in what was then a rural area. Housing tracts were developed on the site of the farm in the 1920s.
