= Standard Club =

Coordinates: 34.056562°N 84.179411°W

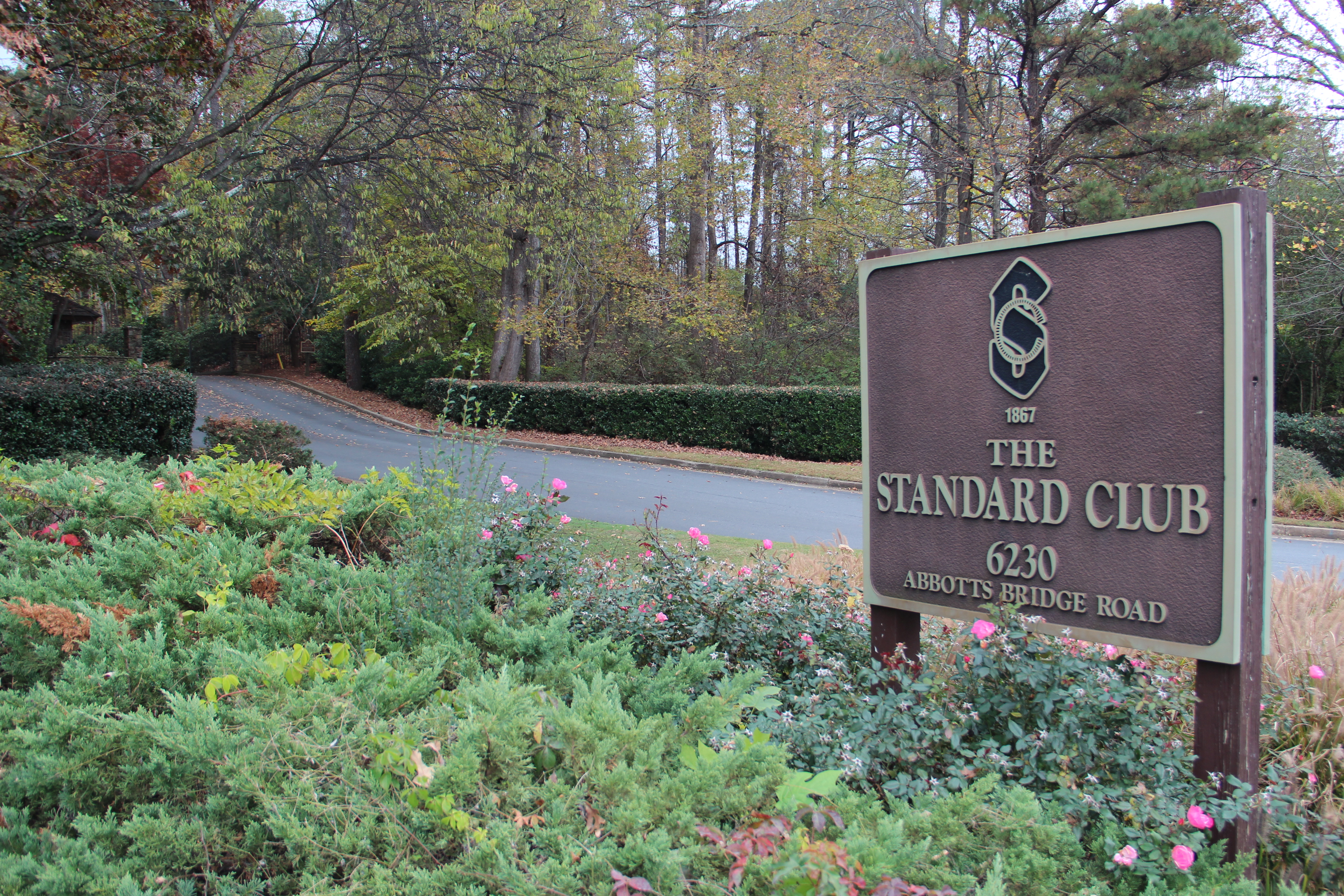
Entrance to the Standard Club off of Georgia State Route 120

The Standard Club is a private country club, founded as the Concordia Association in 1867. Originally located in Atlanta, Georgia, United States, the club is now located in the northern suburb of Johns Creek.

== History ==
The club started as the Concordia Association, a social club for Jews of German descent in 1867 in Downtown Atlanta. Their premises, the 1892 Concordia Hall, are still standing in the Hotel Row historic district. In 1905 it was reorganized as the Standard Club and moved into the former mansion of William C. Sanders on the east side of Washington Street, between Fair Street (now Memorial Drive) and Woodward Avenue. The neighborhood, Washington-Rawson, became the heart of the Jewish community until the 1920s. It was later razed to make way for the Downtown Connector interchange with I-20 and for Atlanta–Fulton County Stadium and its parking lots (now Georgia State Stadium and its parking lots).

In the late 1920s the club moved to Ponce de Leon Avenue in Midtown Atlanta. The site was later acquired by its neighbors, the Yaarab Shrine temple.

In the late 1940s, new quarters opened near Brookhaven, in what is now the Lenox Park business park and was located there until 1983, when Atlanta Inc. and Technology Park redeveloped the land. Today, the five buildings that form the headquarters of AT&T Mobility form a circle overlooking what was once the club's golf course and its lake.

In the 1980s, the club moved to its present location in Johns Creek.
