= Atlanta and Charlotte Air Line Railway =

Railway line in the United States

The Atlanta and Charlotte Air Line Railway emerged from the 1877 re-organization of the Atlanta and Richmond Air Line Railway. Later, in 1894, it became part of the Southern Railway. It was finally merged into the Norfolk Southern Railway in 1996.

The line is currently used by Amtrak's Crescent service, previously known as the Southern Crescent.

== See also ==
- Airline Belle
