= Annie M. Knott =

Christian Science practitioner and teacher

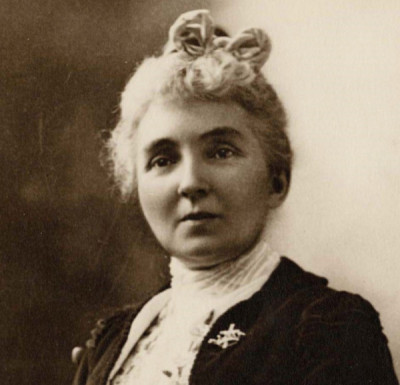
- Born: Annie Macmillan; September 1, 1850; Stewarton, Scotland
- Died: December 20, 1941 (aged 91)
- Occupations: Christian Science practitioner and teacher
- Known for: First woman member of the Christian Science Board of Directors

Signature
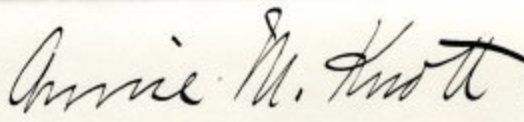

Annie MacMillan Knott (1 September, 1850 – December 20, 1941) was a practitioner and teacher in The First Church of Christ, Scientist. She was a student of Mary Baker Eddy, the founder of the religion, and served the church in various capacities including First Reader, Associate Editor of the Christian Science periodicals, member of the Bible Lesson Committee, one of the first women on the Christian Science Board of Lectureship, Trustee under the Will of Mary Baker Eddy, and the first woman to become a member of the Christian Science Board of Directors.

== Life ==
Born Annie Macmillan, one of three daughters to religious Presbyterian Covenanters William and Catherine Macmillan (née Kerr), in Stewarton, East Ayrshire, Scotland. By the age of eight, she had committed entire chapters of the Bible to memory. Her father was a cousin of the founders of the Macmillan Publishing Company, Daniel and Alexander Macmillan.

Her family emigrated to Ontario, Canada when she was a girl and she grew up there. In 1876, she was married to Kennard Knott. In 1878, they moved to England, where he had been born. While in the London area and acting on a long-held desire to help the sick, she did volunteer work in local hospitals, although she was herself in poor health with bronchitis and other ailments. She began investigating alternatives to medicine, such as homeopathy. In 1881, her little boy died while under the care of a doctor who was a grandson of Samuel Hahnemann, founder of homeopathy.

In January 1882, Knott and her daughters, aged two and four, emigrated to Chicago, where her husband had already relocated. They soon had another child, a boy. One afternoon, when this child was approaching his second birthday, Knott heard him screaming in the kitchen and discovered he'd swallowed much of a bottle of disinfectant, carbolic acid. Doctors arrived shortly and said they didn't expect him to survive and if he did, he'd never be able to swallow normally. Desperate for help, she turned to Christian Science. The child was soon relieved from pain and the next morning, recovered completely, helping himself to an apple he found in the pantry. The experience changed Knott. She had already purchased the Christian Science textbook and had been reading it; after the experience with her son, she began a more intensive study of the book, during which she found her health improving. She then began offering to help others. She also had primary class instruction with Bradford Sherman, a student of Eddy's.

Around this time, her husband abandoned the family. In 1885, having friends in Detroit, Michigan, Knott and her children moved there from Chicago. In 1887 and 1888, she had class instruction with Mary Baker Eddy, who had founded the Christian Science church based upon what she called her discovery of the "Science of the Christ." Afterwards, Knott was given the certificate C.S.D., allowing her to teach Christian Science herself. She also later heard Eddy speak in Chicago.

As a Christian Science practitioner and teacher, and from 1889 to April 1895, pastor, (Note: In April 1895, Mary Baker Eddy ended personal preaching in the Christian Science church, ordaining the Bible and the Christian Science textbook as the permanent pastor of the church.) she became a prominent resident of Detroit and was invited to be one of the people, mostly men, to write letters for the Detroit Century Box, a time capsule organized by the mayor, William C. Maybury. Her letter, along with those from Maybury, James E. Scripps, D. Augustus Straker and more than 50 others, was sealed in a metal box at midnight on December 31, 1900.

In 1919, Knott became the first woman to serve on the church's Board of Directors. She had also been one of the first two women to be appointed to the Board of Lectureship in 1898 along with Sue Harper Mims.
