= Detroit Century Box =

Detroit time capsule from 1900 opened in 2000

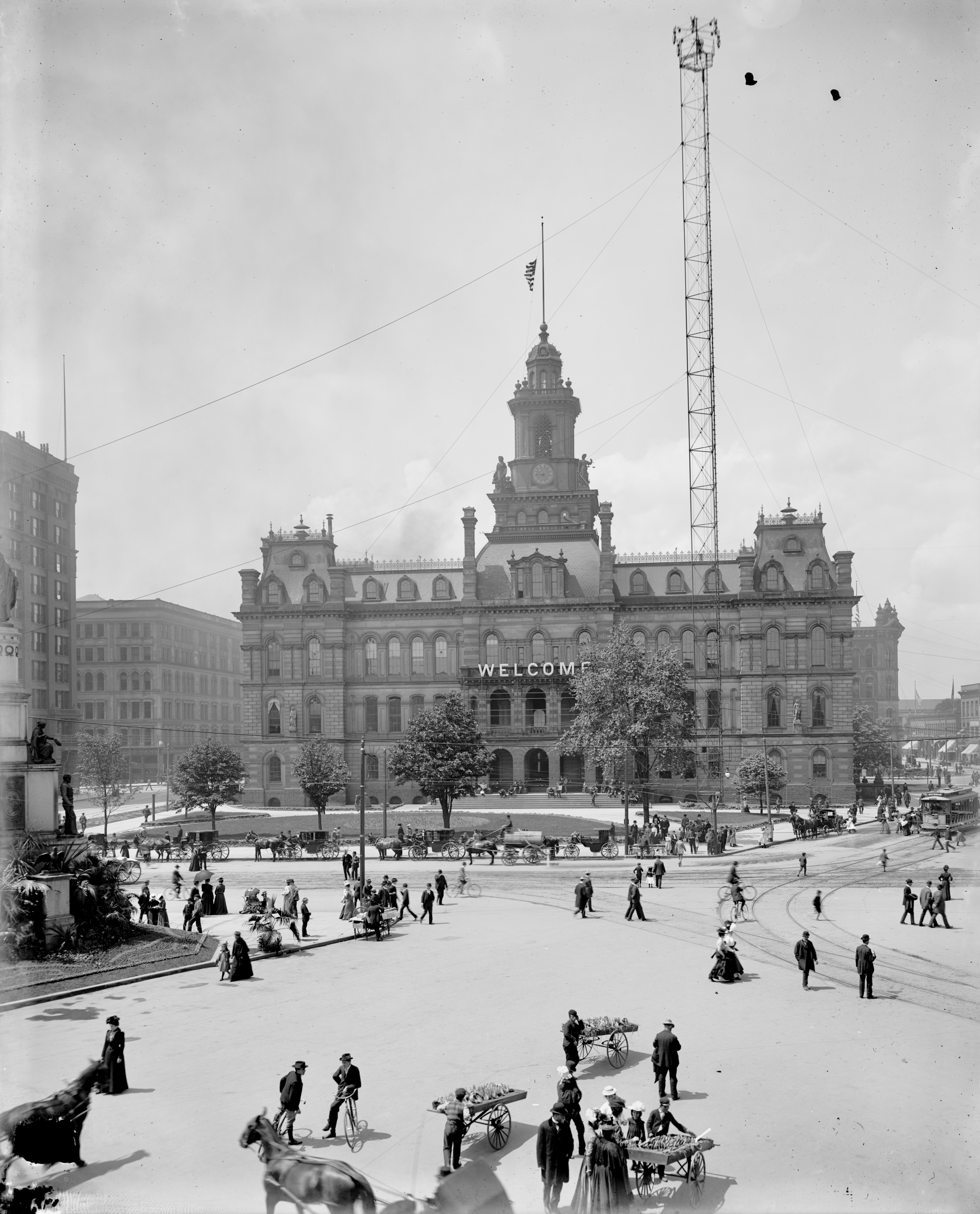
The Detroit City Hall in 1900. It was demolished in 1961.

The Detroit Century Box is a time capsule that was created in the U.S. city of Detroit, Michigan on December 31, 1900. Mayor William C. Maybury organized the capsule which consists of a copper box filled with photos and letters containing the then current state of affairs in Detroit along with predictions for the future. Mayor Dennis Archer presided over the opening of the capsule on December 31, 2000.

== Contents ==
At 11:20 pm on December 31, 2000, Mayor Archer opened the copper "century box" before a ceremony of Detroiters and read a handwritten letter that Mayor Maybury wrote a century earlier:

"How much faster are you traveling? How much farther have you annihilated time and space and what agencies are you employing to which we are strangers?"

He addressed the next century of Detroiters, expressing hope that the letters show "what advancement you have made from the modest beginnings to which we are witnesses."

He ended the letter with "May we be permitted to express one supreme hope - that whatever failures the coming century may have in the progress of things material, you may be conscious when the century is over that, as a nation, people and city, you have grown in righteousness, for it is this that exalts a nation."

== Detroit in 1900 ==
Our buildings of today are equipped with fast running elevators, heating, lighting, power plants...

— John M. Donaldson, Rise of Architecture in Detroit

In the diocese there 218 priests - 44 Regulars - 174 Seculars. 198 Churches and missions...

— John Samuel Foley, Bishop of Detroit, Letter to William C. Maybury

We travel by railroad and with steam power from Detroit to Chicago in less than eight hours...

— William C. Maybury, Letter of William C. Maybury

== Predictions for the future ==
(In) AD 2000 ... I think it not improbable that ... Detroit will enjoy a population of fully four millions.

— James E. Scripps, Letter to William C. Maybury

I predict further that Sandwich, Windsor and Walkerville now in Canada will be a part of the City of Detroit and that Ontario will be a state of the United States of America.

— Orrin R. Baldwin, Letter to William C. Maybury

...fear concerning woman's use of the ballot will have passed away, and by her use of the ballot, there will be less evil and a higher civilization.

— Sara M. Philleo Skinner, Woman's Suffrage - Retrospect and Prophecy

That prisoners instead of being conveyed to the several police stations in Automobile patrol wagons will be sent through pneumatic tubes, flying machines, or some similar process.

— Commissioners of the Metropolitan Police Commission, Letter to William C. Maybury

...that the factory products will be largely transported in Air Ships and discrimination against Detroit shippers will then be a thing of the past; that mechanical skill will control the river's current and the rays of the sun to make power for the industries.

— Orrin R. Baldwin, Detroit's Industrial and Commercial possibilities

== Notable letter writers ==
- Annie M. Knott
- Charles Lang Freer
- Clarence M. Burton
- D. Augustus Straker
- Frederick K. Stearns
- James E. Scripps
- John M. Donaldson
- John Samuel Foley
- William C. Maybury
- William E. Quinby

== See also ==
- List of time capsules
