= Henry R. Durand =

Henry R. Durand (1855–1932) born in Atlanta was president and general manager of the H. R. Durand Restaurant Company, which ran Durand's restaurant at Atlanta's Union Station. In 1919, he was also a director of the Atlanta National Bank.

In 1895, his residence was at 195 Crew Street in the Washington-Rawson neighborhood.
