= Hil'ardin/Sharp-Hardin-Wright House =

Historic house in Georgia, United States

- U.S. National Register of Historic Places
- Location within Georgia
- Location: 212 S. Lee St., Forsyth, Georgia
- Coordinates: 33°01′40″N 83°56′19″W
- Area: 12 acres (4.9 ha)
- Built: c.1836, 1916
- Architect: Dougherty & Gardner
- Architectural style: Classical Revival
- NRHP reference No.: 79000735
- Added to NRHP: June 22, 1979

Hil'ardin, also known as the Sharp-Hardin-Wright House, at 212 S. Lee St. in Forsyth, Georgia, was built in 1836. The house, with two other contributing buildings, was listed on the National Register of Historic Places in 1979.

The visible Classical Revival-style house was created in 1916, enclosing a c.1836 predecessor.
