= Belle Meade Apartments =

- U.S. National Register of Historic Places
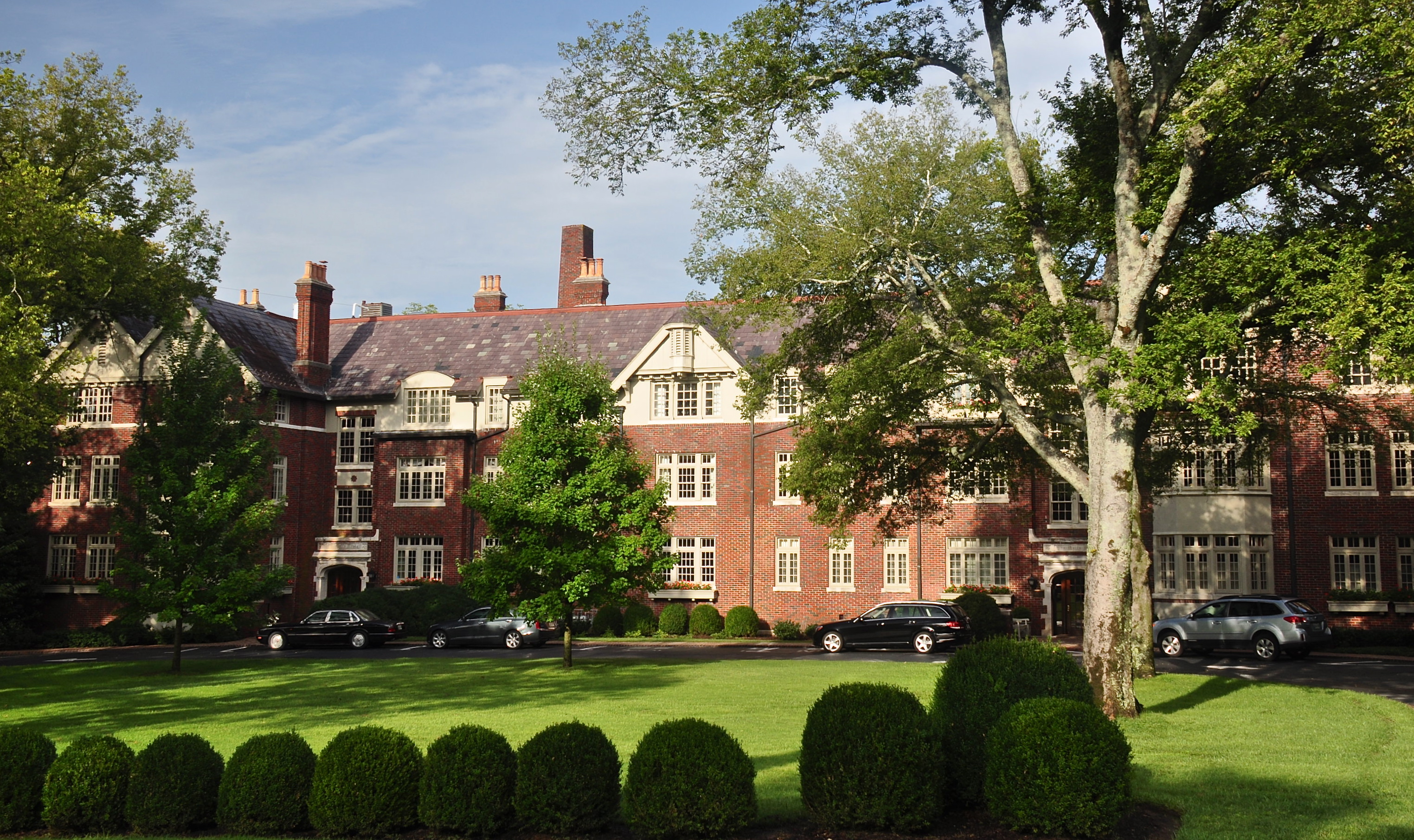
- Belle Meade Apartments in 2014

- Location within Tennessee Location within the United States
- Location: 715 Belle Meade Boulevard, Belle Meade, Tennessee, U.S.
- Coordinates: 36.096389°N 86.857778°W
- Area: 2.5 acres (1.0 ha)
- Built: 1917
- Architect: Edwin Dougherty
- Architectural style: Tudor Revival
- NRHP reference No.: 84003474
- Added to NRHP: April 19, 1984

The Belle Meade Apartments is a historic building in Belle Meade, Tennessee near Nashville. The building is he building is an early example of multi-family residential development in Belle Meade.

== Location ==
The building is located at 715 Belle Meade Boulevard in Belle Meade, a city near Nashville, Tennessee. It stands opposite the Belle Meade Country Club.

== History ==
The Belle Meade Apartments were constructed in 1917. Construction was funded by an investment from Albert Sidney Britt and Herbert H. Corson, two Nashville businessmen. Prominent tenants included William Jackson Elliston and James Cowdon Bradford Sr. (the founder of J.C. Bradford & Co.), Charles Davitt and Joseph Toy Howell, Sr. (then the president of the Cumberland Valley National Bank).

In 1919, Herbert H. Corson purchased the building. After his death, it was inherited by his descendants. The City of Belle Meade was subsequently incorporated to ensure, by the enactment of zoning ordinances, that there would be no further apartment or other commercial development within the vicinity.

== Architectural significance ==
The building was designed in the Tudor Revival architectural style by architect Edwin Dougherty. It has been listed on the National Register of Historic Places since April 19, 1984.
