= St. John's Lutheran Church (Atlanta) =

Church in Atlanta, Georgia, U.S.

Coordinates: 33.7756°N 84.3408°W

- Location: 1410 Ponce De Leon Avenue NE; Atlanta, Georgia 30307
- Denomination: Evangelical Lutheran Church in America
- Website: www.stjohnsatlanta.org

History
- Former name: Die Deutsche Lutherische Germeinde (The German Lutheran Congregation) (1869–1871)
- Founded: July 25, 1869

Architecture
- Architect: Edward Emmett Dougherty
- Style: Gothic Revival
- Completed: 1914

St. John's Lutheran Church is a Lutheran church in Atlanta, Georgia, United States. First organized in 1869, the church moved to its existing location in 1959.

== History ==
Originally named Die Deutsche Lutherische Gemeinde, or "The German Lutheran Congregation", the church was first organized on July 25, 1869, as the first Lutheran church in Atlanta. The name was changed to St. John's Lutheran Church in 1871. In 1873, a small church building housing the congregation was built at the intersection of Forsyth Street and Whitehall Street in downtown Atlanta. In 1885, the congregation moved to a new building in downtown, a former Methodist church building at the intersection of Forsyth and Garnett Street. In 1900, the church joined the German Evangelical Synod of North America. The church experienced a significant decline in membership during World War I, as anti-German sentiment led many members to leave the congregation for the English-speaking Lutheran Church of the Redeemer, which was founded in the city in 1903.

In 1924, the church's building was demolished and the congregation purchased a former Presbyterian church at Euclid Avenue and Druid Circle. In 1945, the church joined the United Lutheran Church in America, which through multiple church unions became the Evangelical Lutheran Church in America, of which St. John's is still a member.

== Stonehenge Mansion ==
In 1959, the congregation again changed locations, purchasing the Stonehenge Mansion on Ponce de Leon Avenue in Eastside, Atlanta. The structure was built in 1914 for Samuel Hoyt Venable, his sister Elizabeth Venable Mason, and her husband and children. It was designed by architect Edward Emmett Dougherty with murals and other artworks painted by Venable's sister Leilla Venable Ellis. The building is an example of Tudor period Gothic Revival architecture and was constructed with granite from Stone Mountain (which at the time was owned by Samuel and his brother William Venable).

The mansion was bought by the church in 1959 for $60,000 and converted into a church building. A sanctuary was added in 1969 based on designs by architects Barker and Cunningham using granite from Stone Mountain. The octagonal shape, used in earlier periods of history to signify the "eighth day of creation" (baptism into the death and resurrection of Jesus), was contemporary in 1969. It seats 300 in five rows around a central altar reflecting "St. John's understanding of the Church as the family of God gathered around the table of God." The four-sided cross above the altar is made of faceted glass and a W. Zimmer & Sons pipe organ was added in 1983.

== Bibliography ==
- Ahrendt, Theodore G. (December 1969). "A History of Lutheranism in Atlanta". Atlanta Historical Bulletin. 14 (4). Atlanta Historical Society: 26–33 – via Atlanta History Center.
