= First Baptist Church (Knoxville, Tennessee) =

Historic church in Tennessee, United States

- U.S. National Register of Historic Places
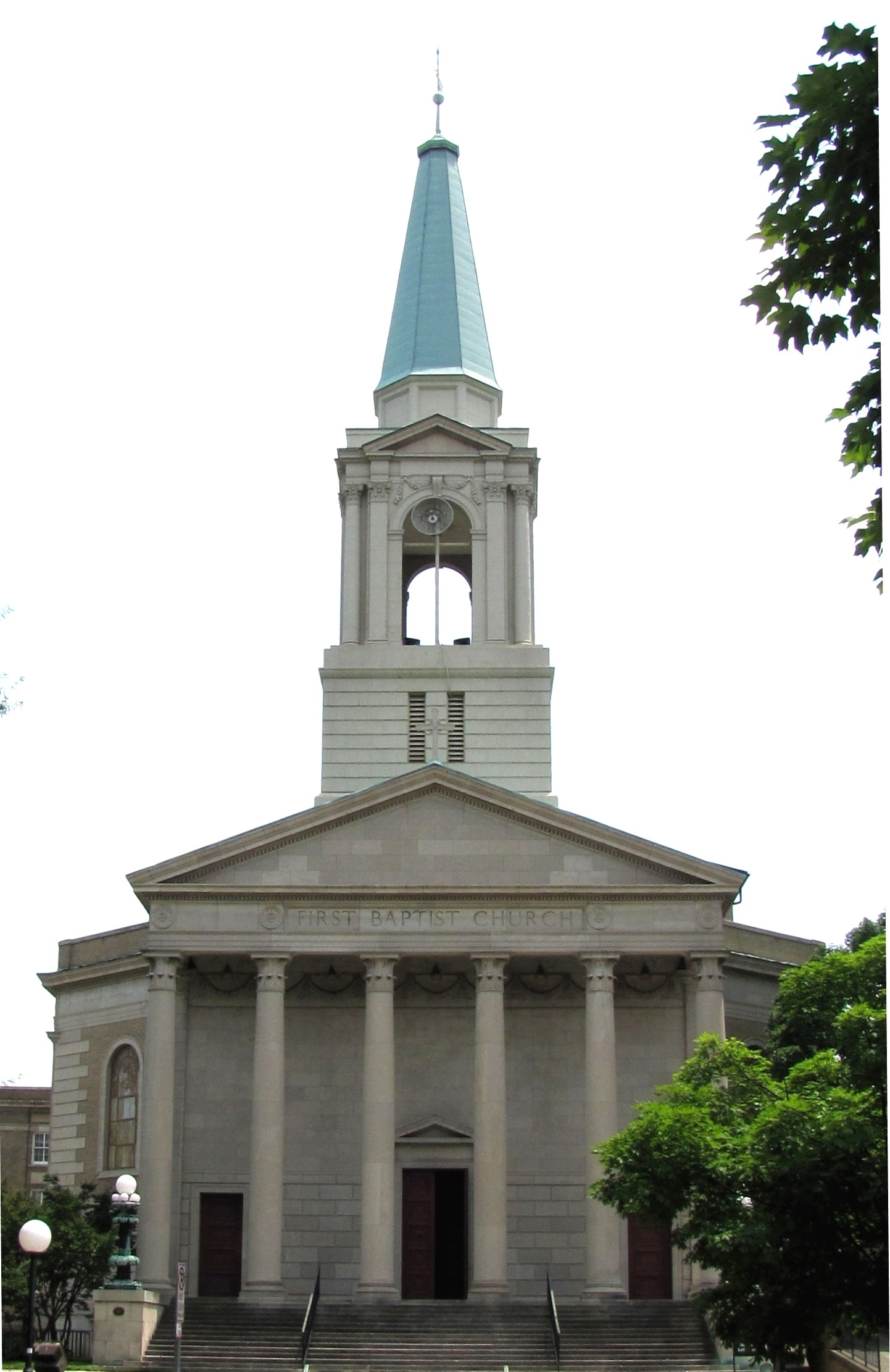
- Church facade in 2010

- Location within Tennessee Location within the United States
- Location: 510 Main Ave., Knoxville, Tennessee
- Coordinates: 35°57′37″N 83°55′7″W
- Area: 3 acres (1.2 ha)
- Built: 1923
- Built by: Worsham Bros.
- Architect: Dougherty & Gardner
- Architectural style: Classical Revival, Octagon
- MPS: Knoxville and Knox County MPS
- NRHP reference No.: 97000223
- Added to NRHP: March 8, 1997

First Baptist Church is a historic church located in Knoxville, Tennessee. It is on the National Register of Historic Places.

The congregation was organized in 1843 by James and John Moses. After its first baptismal service in nearby First Creek, the church had 46 members, including 20 African-Americans. The church organized its first Sunday School in 1845. The first building was constructed on Gay Street in 1844. The second building was built at the same location in 1887.

The third (and present) building was completed in 1923 at the Main Street location, three years after Dr. Frederick Fernando Brown became pastor. A four-manual Hook & Hastings organ was installed, featuring an echo organ located in the tower played from a separate keyboard. This architecturally-significant structure, noteworthy for its Neoclassical design and octagonal sanctuary, was designed by Dougherty & Gardner of Nashville, Tennessee, and is modeled on St Martin-in-the-Fields of London. The exterior of the church sanctuary is sheathed in marble, although the adjoining education space is brick. The congregation is moderate, and is member of the Cooperative Baptist Fellowship, a mainline denomination in the South.
