= Julius L. Brown =

American lawyer

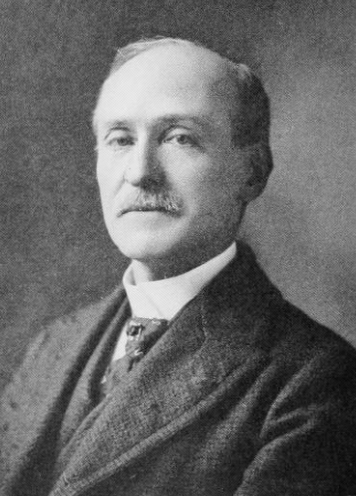

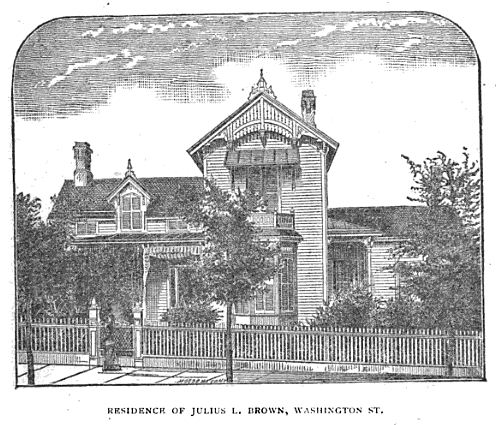
Julius L. Brown residence on Washington Street, 1881

Julius L. Brown (1848–1910) was a prominent Atlanta, Georgia attorney, co-incorporator of the Metropolitan Street Railroad, and brother of Georgia governor and senator Joseph E. Brown.

== Biography ==
Julius L. Brown was born in Canton, Georgia on May 31, 1848. He joined the Confederate States Army in 1864, and remained in it until the end of the Civil War.

He studied at Georgia State University and was admitted to the bar in September 1869. He graduated from Harvard Law School in June 1870. He became general counsel for the Western and Atlantic Railroad in 1872.

His residence was in the Washington–Rawson neighborhood in Atlanta, now demolished. He died there on September 4, 1910.
