= Guildford Dudley, Sr. and Anne Dallas House =

- Guildford Dudley Sr. and Anne Dallas
- U.S. National Register of Historic Places
- Location within Tennessee Location within the United States
- Location: 5401 Hillsboro Pike, Forest Hills, Tennessee, U.S.
- Coordinates: 36°05′07″N 86°50′04″W
- Area: 6.2 acres (2.5 ha)
- Built: 1928
- Built by: Foster & Creighton
- Architect: Dougherty & Gardner
- Architectural style: Tudor Revival, Late Gothic Revival
- MPS: Forest Hills, Tennessee MPS
- NRHP reference No.: 03001080
- Added to NRHP: October 23, 2003

The Guildford Dudley Sr. and Anne Dallas House is a historic house in Forest Hills, Tennessee, United States.

== History ==
The house was built in 1928 for Guildford Dudley Sr, a co-founder of the Life and Casualty Insurance Company of Tennessee, and his wife, Anne Dallas Dudley. Mrs. Dudley was a supporter of women's suffrage in Tennessee. Their son, Guilford Dudley, served as the United States ambassador to Denmark from 1969 to 1971.

The house was purchased by Otto Linderberg and his wife Louise in 1935, and later inherited by Elise and Enid Lindenberg. Elise and her husband, P. D. Houston, who was the president of the First American National Bank, moved into the P. D. Houston Jr. House, and the Dallas house was sold to Paul Montcastle and his wife Lucy in 1951. Montcastle was the president of the Life and Casualty Insurance Company.

== Architectural significance ==
The house was designed in the Tudor Revival architectural style by Dougherty & Gardner. It has been listed on the National Register of Historic Places since October 23, 2003.
