= The Power of Half =

2010 book by Kevin and Hannah Salwen

The Power of Half: One Family's Decision to Stop Taking and Start Giving Back
- Author: Hannah Salwen, Kevin Salwen
- Language: English
- Subject: Consumption (economics) and consumer behavior; Moral and ethical aspects
- Publisher: Houghton Mifflin Harcourt
- Publication date: February 2010
- Publication place: United States
- Media type: Hardcover; audiobook on CD
- Pages: 256
- ISBN: 0-547-39454-3
- Dewey Decimal: 174 22
- LC Class: HC110.C6 S255 2010

The Power of Half: One Family's Decision to Stop Taking and Start Giving Back is a book written by Kevin Salwen and his teenage daughter Hannah in 2010.

The book describes how the Salwen family decided to sell their home so that they could donate half the proceeds to charity. It discusses the initial decision-making, the process of selling the home, making the donation, downgrading to a smaller home, and what they learned in the process. The book details the Salwens' process in choosing a charity partner that would fit their values and effect a lasting change, and how their actions supporting and empowering a village in Ghana differed from their original idea of "direct involvement".

== Synopsis ==
The book details why and how the Salwen family decided to sell their home in 2006. The home was a luxurious, 6,500-square-foot (600-square-meter), 1912 historic dream-house in Ansley Park, in midtown Atlanta, Georgia. It had Corinthian columns, five bedrooms, eight fireplaces, four ornate bathrooms, and a private elevator to Hannah's bedroom.

The family down-graded by replacing their home with a house that was half as expensive and less than half the size. The Salwens donated half the proceeds ($850,000) of the sale of their original home to The Hunger Project.

The book describes the consensus-driven process that the parents and their two children used–over a period of time–to reach the decision to give away half the value of their home, and how they chose the charity from a number of non-profit organizations that they considered. It describes the challenges that the family faced while turning their family project into a reality, from economic ones to keeping the project a secret for a period of time so that they would not appear to be "freaks" to their friends.

Before they embarked on the project, the family members had little contact with one another, other than at meals. Hannah notes that The Power of Half "is a relationships book, not really a giving book." She feels that the project helped her family grow closer to one another. The New York Times Book Review notes how the family "became happier with less—and urges others to do likewise."

"We know that selling a house is goofy, and we recognize that most people can't do it", admitted Kevin Salwen. "We never encourage anybody to sell their house. That was just the thing that we had more than enough of. For others it may be time, or lattes, or iTunes downloads, or clothes in their closet. But everyone has more than enough of something." He clarified:

We want our kids to be idealistic, but we also say, 'Let's not go too nuts here'. We're not Mother Teresa. We're not taking a vow of poverty, or giving away half of everything we own. We gave away half of one thing, which happened to be our house. Everybody can give away half of one thing, and put it to use. You'll do a little bit of good for the world–and amazing things for your relationships.

== Popular reception ==
Archbishop Desmond Tutu praised Hannah and the Salwens for the project, remarking: "We often say that young people must not let themselves be infected by the cynicism of their elders. Hannah inoculated her family with the vision to dream a different world, and the courage to help create it."

Skeptics criticized them for "self-promotion" or for the amount of money they donated to charity. Some critics questioned their choice of charity—finding fault with the family for having donated their money to help needy people in Africa rather than in the United States. Not everyone understood the parents' egalitarian approach with their children, or the family's underlying philosophy. Commented one viewer of a television interview: "What kind of ass clown works his tail off, and busts his hump getting a decent education, only to listen to his kid suggest they give away the house?"

As Kevin Salwen noted: "Most people are supportive. And a few are very uncomfortable." Asked facetiously whether Hannah, then still in high school, had "concocted the world's greatest college-admissions ploy", Kevin laughed and replied: "No. Anyway, wouldn't it be the world's most expensive?"

== Critical reception ==
Reviewing it for The Washington Post, Lisa Bonos wrote that the book, "soaring in idealism, and yet grounded in realism, can show Americans of any means how best to give back." Nicholas D. Kristof, writing in The New York Times, said he found the project "crazy, impetuous, and utterly inspiring", and that "It's a book that, frankly, I'd be nervous about leaving around where my own teenage kids might find it. An impressionable child reads this, and the next thing you know your whole family is out on the street." In the Los Angeles Times, Susan Salter Reynolds wrote: "You feel lighter reading this book, as if the heavy weight of house and car and appliances, the need to collect these things to feel safe as a family, are lifted and replaced by something that makes much more sense."

Lili Rosboch wrote for Bloomberg that it "is an inspiring book about the decision to trade objects for togetherness and the chance to help others." Writing in Grist, Jen Harper said that while she was somewhat skeptical before she started the book, the "compelling and well-written narrative left me both impressed and inspired," and that she found the book "endearing, funny, and uplifting". Courtney E. Martin wrote in The Daily Beast that the book "is highly accessible, sure to be devoured by Oprah devotees and disaffected finance guys hoping for a jolt of optimism." Bill Williams of The Boston Globe called it "spirited". Also writing for The Boston Globe, Joseph P. Kahn said "they're my new role models" – after admitting: "I confess to being fixated on the opposite life formula. Call it the Power of Twice. As in, twice the leisure time, twice the income, twice the sleep. A man can dream, can't he?"

== Subsequent projects ==
The project inspired others to commit to donating half their money, or half of a possession or income, to charity. In an interview in Natural Home Magazine, Hannah noted that "A number of my friends at Atlanta Girls School have started their own Half projects, including a couple who are donating half of their babysitting money to environmental causes. That's pretty flattering."

Rev. Tess Baumberger, the Minister at Unity Church of North Easton, Massachusetts, read the book and announced that in December 2010 the Church would give away half of its Sunday collections to a local charity. Baumberger remarked: "What will we learn by practicing the power of half? What will this program teach our children and youth? I cannot wait to find out."

Melinda Gates, ex-wife of Microsoft founder Bill Gates, said she was inspired by the Salwens' philanthropic efforts. On December 9, 2010, Bill Gates, Mark Zuckerberg, and Warren Buffett signed a promise they called the "Gates-Buffet Giving Pledge", in which they promised to donate to charity at least half of their wealth. After launching the Giving Pledge, the Gates invited the Salwens to Seattle for a photo shoot and conversation about The Power of Half.
