= Sue Harper Mims =

Christian Science practitioner and teacher

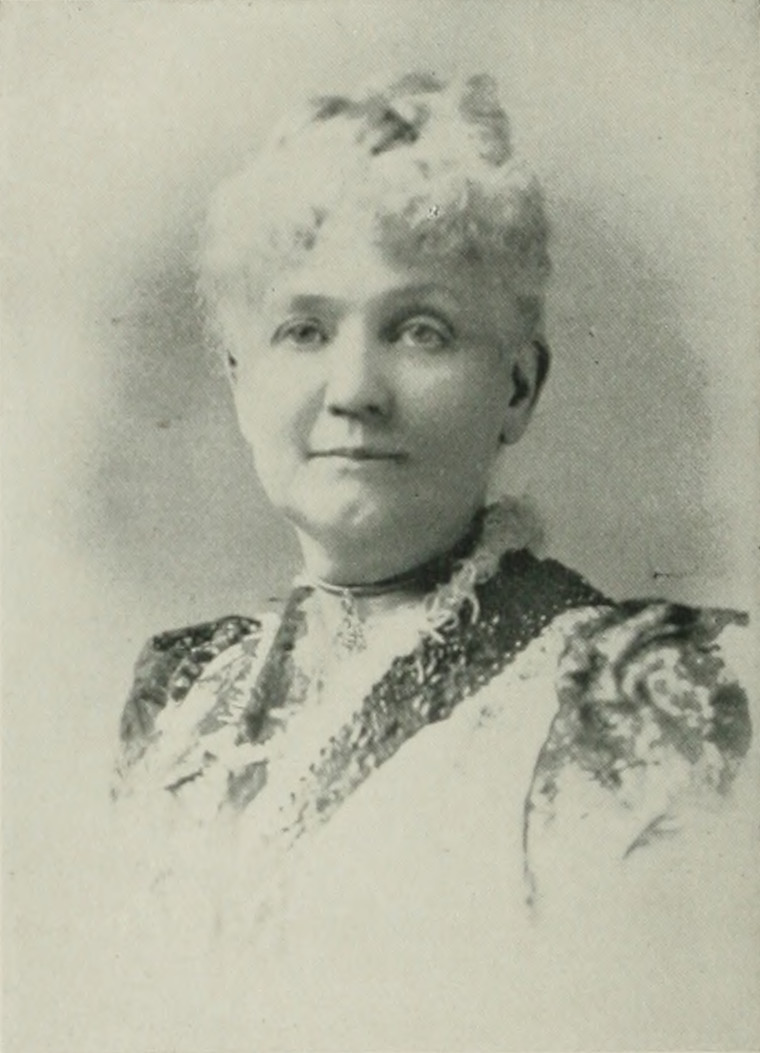
- "A Woman of the Century"
- Born: Susan Harper; May 17, 1842; Brandon, Mississippi
- Died: January 30, 1913 (aged 70); Brookline, Massachusetts
- Spouse(s): Livingston Mims (m. 1866-1906 d.)

Sue Harper Mims (17 May 1842 - 30 January 1913), C.S.D., was a social leader in Atlanta, Georgia and the wife of Livingston Mims, the 37th mayor of Atlanta, Georgia, United States. She was a member of The First Church of Christ, Scientist, and helped found its branch church in Atlanta.

== Biography ==
Sue Harper was born on May 17, 1842, in Brandon, Mississippi to Col. William C. Harper, a lawyer, and his wife Mary C. Johnson Harper. She received a high quality education and traveled extensively, and later in life she was noted for having a significant library of books. She was very religious, and was a member of the Episcopal Church. Harper married Maj. Livingston Mims in 1866, a prominent businessman and civil war veteran who would become the mayor of Atlanta in 1901.

As the wife of Livingston Mims, Sue Harper Mims was known as a social leader in Atlanta. He was the president of the Capitol City Club in Atlanta, and entertained guests such as United States President Grover Cleveland. The Mims household was known as a gathering place for "literary, artistic and musical people", and she had a wide influence on intellectual and ethical culture of the city. She was the first president of Home for the Friendless, an Atlanta charity for youth; and one of the founders of the city's Shakespeare Club.

In 1886, Mims attended a talk in Atlanta given by Julia S. Bartlett, a student of Mary Baker Eddy, the founder of The First Church of Christ, Scientist. At that time, Mims had an illness physicians had not been able to cure for fifteen years, and which apparently "prevented her from walking more than a few blocks." After hearing Bartlett speak, she sought her help. Mims soon recovered and began studying Christian Science and telling others about the faith.

Mims began holding informal church services with four other Christian Scientists at her house at 575 Peachtree Street; The small group grew, and within a few months they rented a small room on the same street, and then a larger one on Broad Street. They officially organized with thirty-two charter members in January 1893 and moved again to the De Give Opera House which seated 250 people.

Mims was taught by Mary Baker Eddy as part of Eddy's last class in 1898. That same year, she and Annie M. Knott were appointed as the first women on the Christian Science Board of Lectureship, and Mims became one of the first teachers of Christian Science in the American Southeast. She remained on the Board of Lectureship for fifteen years and lectured across the United States, and was the first Christian Science lecturer to deliver an official lecture in the southern United States. In her work as a teacher, she taught both black and white students, which was notable in the still segregated south. Mims' students included Etter Haden Foster, Lewis Johnson, and Ides Johnson, who founded First Church of Christ, Scientist in Birmingham, Alabama; Elizabeth Earl Jones, another teacher of Christian Science; and Orelia Key Bell, a poet and author. She also wrote a number of articles for the church periodicals.

Mims remained involved with First Church of Christ, Scientist, Atlanta, which began steps to build an edifice on Baker Street in April 1896, and which was completed in the spring of 1899. The church continued to grow, and after about a decade decided to sell their edifice and build a new one. Mims was again involved in this process, including selecting the lot at 15th and Peachtree Street where it still stands. However, she died in January 1913, two months before ground was broken at the new site. Her husband Livingston Mims, who died in 1906, never became a member of the church, but supported his wife.
