= Edward Emmett Dougherty =

American architect

- Born: March 18, 1876; Atlanta, Georgia, U.S.
- Died: November 11, 1943 (aged 67)
- Education: University of Georgia
- Occupation: Architect
- Spouse: Blanch Carson

Edward Emmett Dougherty, a.k.a. Edwin Dougherty (March 18, 1876 – November 11, 1943) was an architect in the southeastern United States. One of his best known designs was the Tennessee War Memorial Auditorium in Nashville in 1922. The work won state and national design competitions.

== Early life ==
Edward Emmett Dougherty was born on March 18, 1876, in Atlanta, Georgia. He graduated from the University of Georgia in 1895. He then studied architecture at Cornell University and the Ecole des Beaux Arts in Paris.

== Career ==
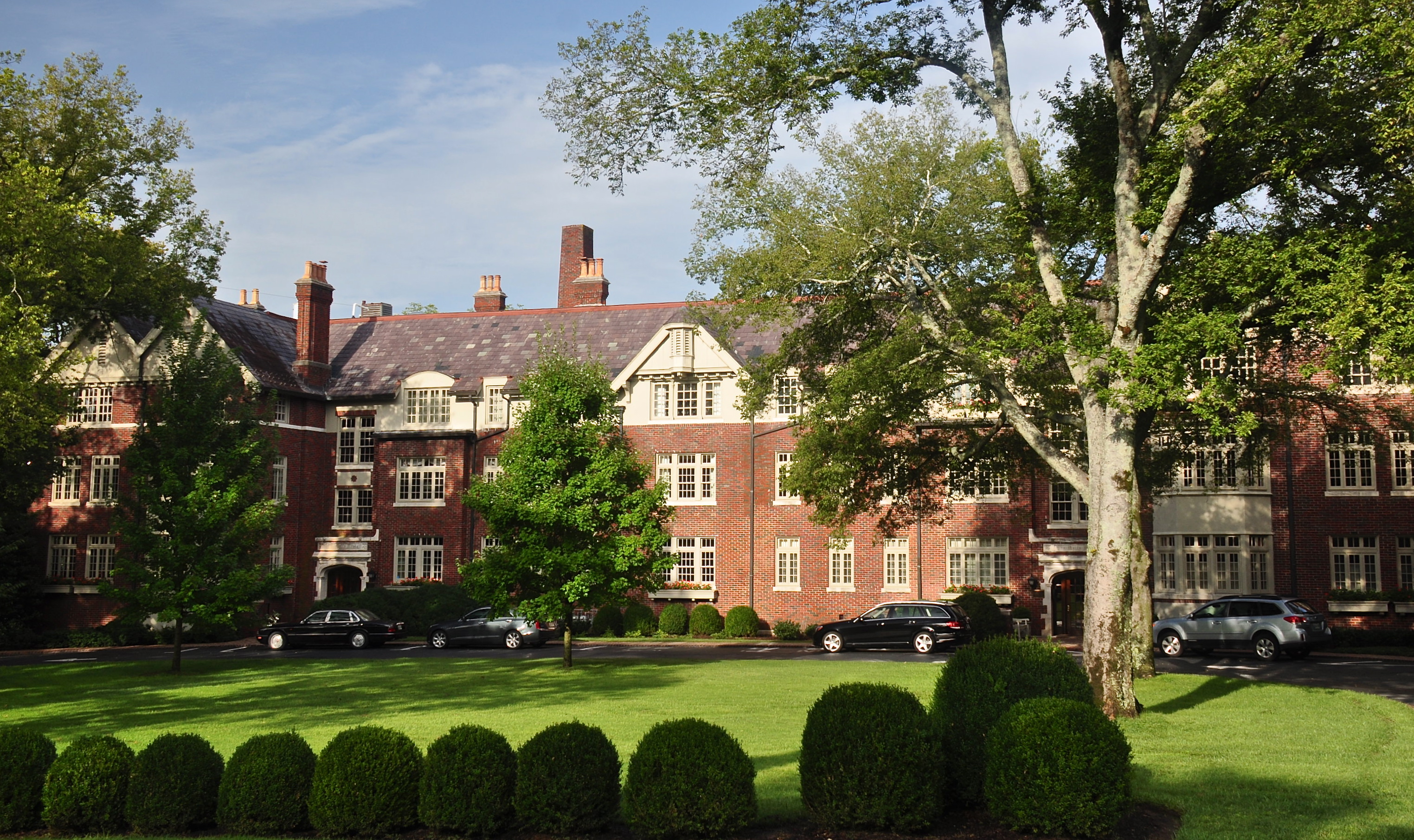
Belle Meade Apartments.

As an architect, Dougherty partnered with Arthur Neal Robinson for a few years. He was also a partner in Dougherty & Gardner and in Dougherty, Wallace and Clemmons.

An impressive string of successful projects in Atlanta brought notice and numerous commissions in Nashville where Dougherty moved in 1916 for the second part of his career. That year he designed Nashville's Belle Meade Country Club. In 1917, he designed the nearby Belle Meade Apartments, listed on the National Register of Historic Places. He designed projects for the Nashville, Chattanooga and St. Louis Railway. Several buildings designed by Dougherty are listed on the U.S. National Register of Historic Places.

== Tennessee War Memorial Auditorium ==
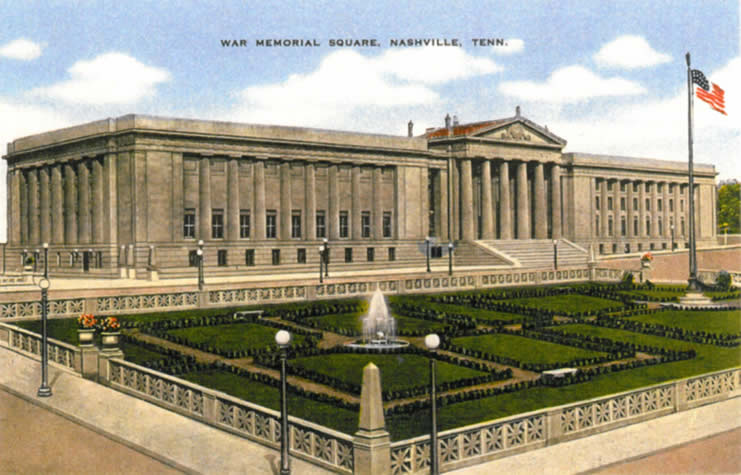
Nashville War Memorial Auditorium

Dougherty received the contract for a 2,000-seat auditorium, Tennessee's War Memorial Building, now known as the War Memorial Auditorium (1922) in a "spirited competition" according to the Nashville Tennessean. A jury of nationally-known architects devised a competition to narrow the competitors to six; three from Tennessee and three from out-of state. The designers were kept anonymous and the choice was made by a commission of local city fathers at the Hermitage Hotel in Nashville on February 14, 1922. Dougherty's design was the unanimous choice.

== Personal life ==
Dougherty married Blanch Carson on June 5, 1907.

== Death ==
Dougherty died on November 11, 1943, at a Nashville Hospital at age 68. He had suffered a heart attack at his apartment the night before.

== Works ==
- One or more works in Adair Park Historic District, bounded by Metropolitan Pkwy., Lexington Ave., Norfolk Southern RR and Shelton Ave., Atlanta, Georgia (Dougherty, Edward E., et al.), NRHP-listed
- Central Baptist Church, 500 N.E. 1st Ave., Miami, Florida (Dougherty & Gardner), NRHP-listed
- Central Presbyterian Church, 201 Washington St. SW, Atlanta, Georgia (Dougherty & Gardner), NRHP-listed
- Doctor's Building, 706 Church St., Nashville, Tennessee (Dougherty and Gardner), NRHP-listed
- Druid Hills Baptist Church (1925–1928) 1085 Ponce de Leon Ave. NE at Moreland Ave., Druid Hills, City of Atlanta
- Druid Hills Golf Club (1912–1914)
- Guildfor Dudley, Sr. and Anne Dallas House, 5401 Hillsboro Pike Forest Hills, Tennessee (Dougherty & Gardner), NRHP-listed
- Belle Meade Country Club Nashville, 815 Belle Meade Boulevard
- First Baptist Church, Winston-Salem, North Carolina (Dougherty & Gardner)
- First Baptist Church, 510 Main Ave., Knoxville, Tennessee (Dougherty & Gardner), NRHP-listed
- Highland School, 978 North Ave., NE, Atlanta, Georgia (Dougherty, Edward E.), NRHP-listed
- Hil'ardin/Sharp-Hardin-Wright House, 212 S. Lee St., Forsyth, Georgia (Dougherty & Gardner), NRHP-listed
- Home Park School, 1031 State St., NW, Atlanta, Georgia (Dougherty, Edward), NRHP-listed
- Imperial Hotel, 355 Peachtree St., Atlanta, Georgia (Dougherty, Edward E.), NRHP-listed
- One or more works in Valdosta Commercial Historic District (Boundary Increase), roughly bounded by Valley, Lee, and Toombs Sts. and Crane Ave., Valdosta, Georgia (Dougherty, Edward E.), NRHP-listed
- Sam Venable home, also known as Stonehedge Mansion and now converted to St. John's Lutheran Church (Atlanta, Georgia)
- Central Baptist Church, 500 NE 1st Ave. Miami, Florida (with Thomas Gardner) It was built on lots donated by Henry Flagler.
- Gateway to Percy Warner Park, Nashville
