= Lenox Park, Brookhaven, Georgia =

Neighborhood of Brookhaven, Georgia

Coordinates: 33°48′00″N 84°21′18″W

Lenox Park is a neighborhood of homes and office buildings located primarily within the city of Brookhaven, Georgia, United States, just east of the northern border of the city of Atlanta.

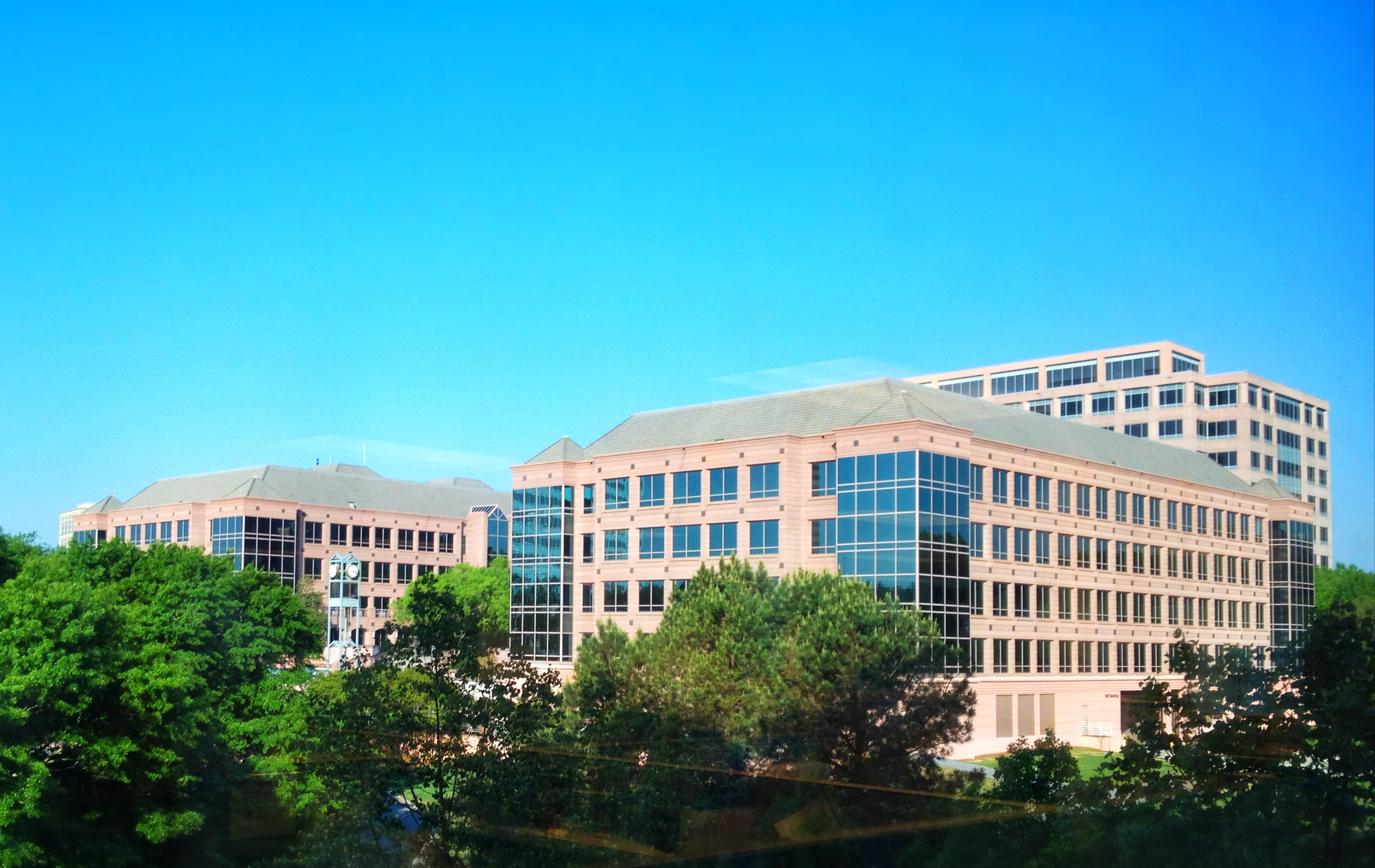
AT&T Mobility headquarters (and other AT&T departments) in Lenox Park

== Location ==
Lenox Park is located in the "Y" formed by Roxboro Road on the west and North Druid Hills Road on the east. The westernmost portion is located in the Pine Hills neighborhood of Atlanta's Buckhead district. The Brookhaven Heights neighborhood borders Lenox Park on the north.

== Park and homes ==
The actual park for which the neighborhood is named is a 22-acre greenspace now known as Central Park. In 2000, the population of Lenox Park, excluding the small portion in Fulton County, was 1,727.

== Office buildings and transportation ==
Most of the office space in Lenox Park is used by AT&T Mobility and other departments of AT&T. Public transportation is provided through a frequent BUC (Buckhead Uptown Connection) shuttle to the Lenox MARTA station during business hours.

The park offers recreational trails. However, it lacks a directly walkable option for residents to the nearby Brookhaven Peachtree road corridor that has numerous stores and MARTA station.

== History ==
The Standard Club, a Jewish country club, opened on what is now Lenox Park in 1940 and was located there until 1983, when it moved to Johns Creek.

== See also ==
- Brookhaven, Georgia
