= Livingston Mims =

Mayor of Atlanta, Georgia, United States

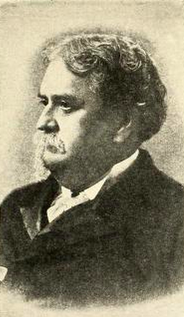

Mayor of Atlanta
- Preceded by: James G. Woodward
- Succeeded by: Evan P. Howell

Personal details
- Party: Democratic
- Spouse: Sue Harper Mims

Livingston Mims (1833 – March 4, 1906) was an American politician who served as the 37th mayor of Atlanta, Georgia during the early 20th century.

== Biography ==
Born in Edgefield, South Carolina, Mims later moved to Mississippi and represented Hinds County in the state legislature from 1859 to 1861. He was the eldest child of Henry Mims and Susan Burr Read of Edgefield, South Carolina. He had 14 siblings.

During the United States Civil War, Major Mims served with the Confederate States Army under General John C. Pemberton and saw action in the Battle of Jackson, Champion Hill and Vicksburg Campaign. He served on the staffs of John C. Pemberton and Joseph E. Johnston and shared friendship with Johnson along with continued business interests until Johnson's death in 1891.

After the war, he became southern manager of the New York Life Insurance Company (since 1868) and he was charter member and served 20 years as president of the Capital City Club, where he entertained notables such as President Grover Cleveland. Following his death in 1906, he was buried in Westview Cemetery. In observance of his death, Atlanta's City Hall was closed for one half day, and free carriage rides were offered from City Hall to the Westview Cemetery.

Politically he was an old school Democrat and he was elected mayor of Atlanta in October 1900. The election came in the midst of Atlanta's streetcar war; he was supported by Joel Hurt (Atlanta Consolidated Street Railway Company) and opposed by Henry M. Atkinson (Georgia Electric Light Company).

On October 9, 1901 he rode in the inaugural streetcar over the Peachtree-Whitehall viaduct – before then it was a dangerous at-grade crossing of many busy railroad tracks.

His two-story residence was on the northeast corner of Peachtree St and Ponce de Leon Avenue (current location of the Georgian Terrace Hotel).

== Personal life ==
Mims married Sue Harper, a native of Brandon, Mississippi, in 1866. Mrs. Mims developed a serious incurable illness that lasted 15 years until in early 1886 Sue Harper Mims was healed through Christian Science. She later became a Christian Science Practitioner and later a Teacher of Christian Science. Mrs. Mims also became a lecturer of Christian Science, traveling around the United States giving talks on Christian Science and Mary Baker Eddy, the Discover and Founder of Christian Science. She was instrumental in the development of Christian Science in Atlanta, Georgia, ultimately hosting church services in her home before the first Christian Science church in Atlanta was built.

Regarding his own religion, Livingston Mims said:

"I do not know exactly the church to which I owe allegiance, as I am a contributor to several. My wife is a Christian Scientist, my daughter is an Episcopalian, my father was a Baptist, my mother was a Presbyterian, and I am a confederate Veteran with inclinations to the Salvation Army."

== Legacy ==
Livingston's onetime Atlanta home became the site of a restaurant by Gary Mennie in 2009. The restaurant is named "Livingston" after the former mayor.

The former Mims Park in Vine City was named after Mims. The park became the site of an elementary school.

== Notes ==
Preceded by James G. Woodward	Mayor of Atlanta; January 1901 – January 1903	Succeeded by Evan P. Howell
