= Warsaw, Georgia =

- Ghost town
- Location within Georgia Location within the United States
- Coordinates: 31°35′24″N 81°29′42″W
- Country: United States
- State: Georgia
- County: McIntosh
- Elevation: 16 ft (5 m)
- Time zone: UTC-5 (Eastern (EST))
  - Summer (DST): UTC-4 (EDT)
- ZIP code: 31323
- Area code: 912
- GNIS feature ID: 333369

Warsaw is an extinct town in McIntosh County, in the U.S. state of Georgia. The GNIS classifies it as a populated place.

== History ==
Variant names are "Darien Junction", "Old Darien Junction", and "Theo". A post office called Theo was established in 1895, and remained in operation until 1907. The most recent name of "Warsaw" was adopted in 1915. The present name may be borrowed from Warsaw, in Poland.

After the town's sawmill burned in 1934, Warsaw's population began to dwindle.
