= Arthur Neal Robinson =

American architect

Arthur Neal Robinson Sr.
- Born: 1886
- Died: 1958 (aged 71–72)
- Occupation: Architect
- Spouse: Flossie J. Robinson

Arthur Neal Robinson Sr. (1886–1958) was an architect in Atlanta, Georgia. He partnered with Edward Emmett Dougherty for a few years. Robinson was born in Atlanta in 1886 and graduated from Hunter's School for Boys in 1902. He attended the University of Georgia and worked as a draftsman for Harry Walker and then for Edward Dougherty beginning in 1907. In 1912, they formed the firm of Dougherty and Robinson. He produced several designs for residences in Druid Hills and Morningside neighborhood and worked on church designs with Dougherty.

Robinson's son Arthur Neal Robinson Jr. trained at Georgia Tech and Yale to become an architect and formed the firm of Arthur Neal Robinson Sr. and Jr., Architects and Engineers with his father. It lasted until 1958.

He married Flossie Jap of Cincinnati.

== Work ==
- Second Church of Christ Scientist in Cincinnati, Ohio
- First Church of Christ, Scientist in Atlanta, Georgia (15th and Peachtree Street)
- Arthur Neal Robinson House (1912), a Prairie architecture style house with Arts and Crafts movement elements at 924 Springdale Road
- Dr. Frank Huss Cottage at 1047 Oakdale (1920)
- C. S. Carnes Cottage at 1296 Fairview Road (1926) Morningside. Robinson's reputation grew, and George Willis hired Robinson to be the primary architect for his new city of Avondale Estates. Based on Stratford-Upon-Avon, Robinson designed the commercial core and community center in the Tudor style. The residence for Lee Hagan at 916 Springdale Road (1920) shows Robinson's use of the Renaissance inspired work that was also popular at that time.
