= Ayersville, Georgia =

Unincorporated community in Georgia, U.S.

Coordinates: 34°33′39″N 83°24′48″W

Ayersville is an unincorporated community in Stephens County, in the U.S. state of Georgia. A variant name was "Ayers".

== History ==
Ayersville was named after Nathaniel and his son Jeremiah Ayers, pioneers who arrived c. 1810. Nathaniel Ayers was the son of Moses & Abigail Ayers. The post office called Ayersville was established in 1874, and remained in operation until 1955. In 1900, the community had 79 inhabitants. Nathaniel's log cabin is still there and a National land mark being the oldest house in the area.
