= Mechanicsville, Gwinnett County, Georgia =

Unincorporated community in Georgia, U.S.

- Unincorporated community
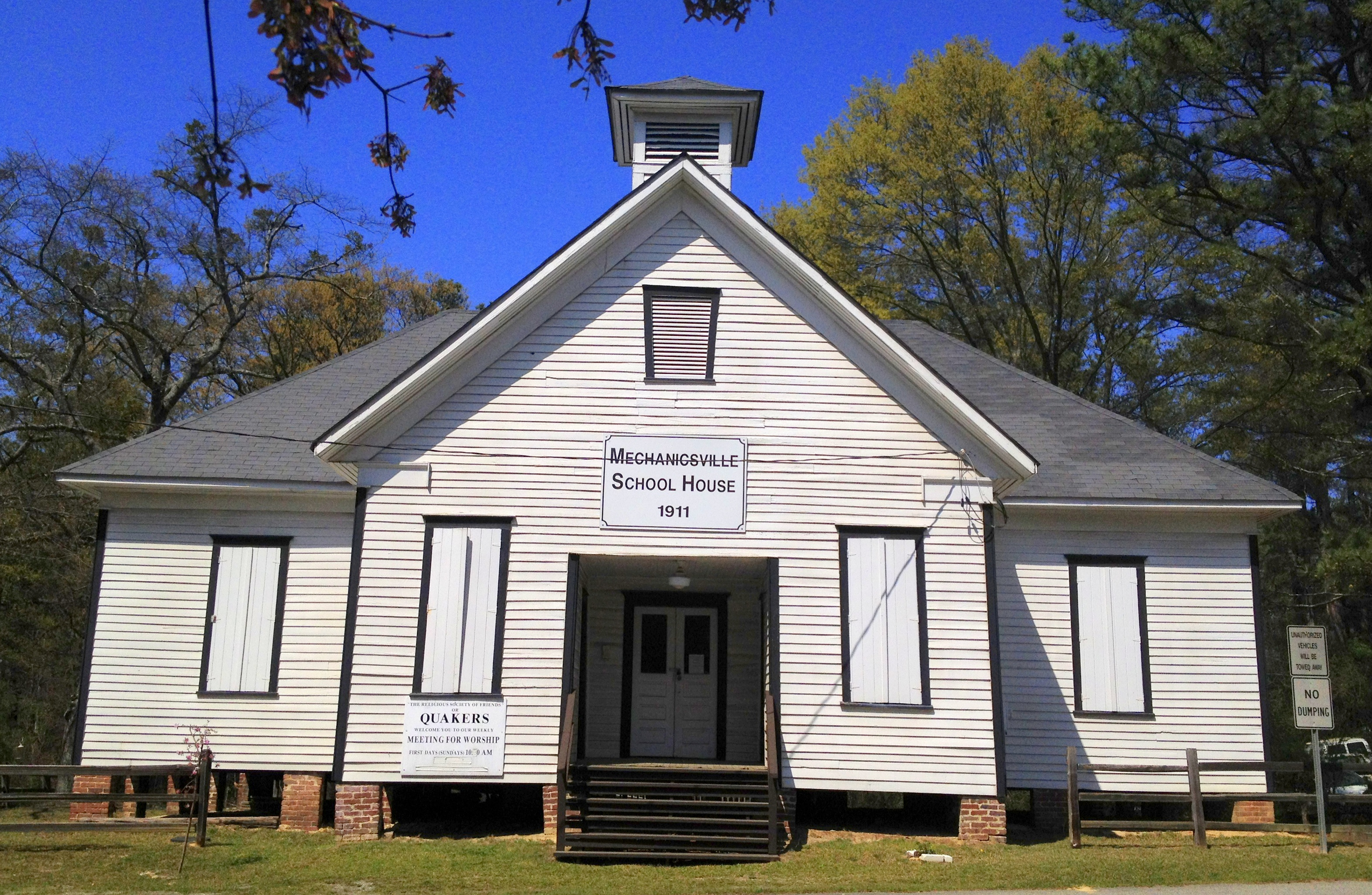
- Mechanicsville School House

- Location in Metro Atlanta
- Coordinates: 33°55′39″N 84°14′33″W
- Country: United States of America
- State: Georgia
- County: Gwinnett
- Elevation: 1,060 ft (320 m)
- GNIS feature ID: 332366

Mechanicsville is an unincorporated community in Gwinnett County, Georgia, United States, just south of Buford Highway around Button Gwinnett Road. It is located roughly 3.5 miles away from Interstate 285, and 10 miles north of Atlanta city limits.

The Mechanicsville schoolhouse, built in 1911, is located at the intersection of 3rd Street and Florida Avenue. As of 2011, it was under restoration.
