= Cornel Zimmer Organ Builders =

American organ building company

Cornel Zimmer Organ Builders, distinct from W. Zimmer and Sons, is an organ manufacturer in Denver, North Carolina. The business is run by Cornel Zweifel Zimmer (born 13 June 1961 in Potchefstrom, South Africa. Cornel Zimmer is a fourth generation organ builder.

Zimmer organs are at many churches including notable sites such as Cathedral of Our Lady of Perpetual Help (Oklahoma City) and St. John's Lutheran Church (Atlanta, Georgia).

== History ==
With the help of two of Wilhelm Zimmer's brothers already living in the United States, the family moved to Charlotte, North Carolina from South Africa in May 1964. They established W. Zimmer & Sons, Inc. and became citizens in 1971. Cornel Zimmer was born in South Africa in 1961.
