= Venable Brothers =

American quarrying business

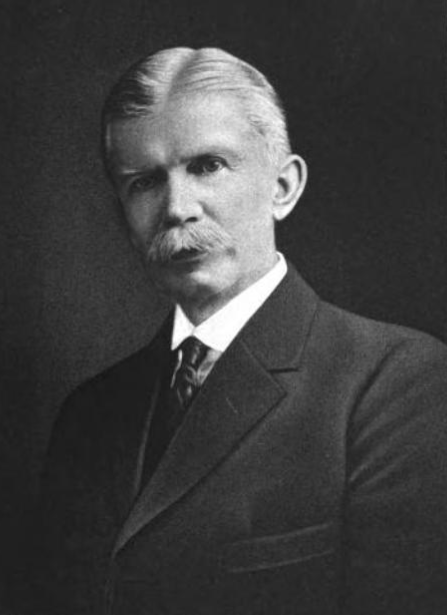
Samuel Hoyt Venable

The Venable Brothers was a business venture formed by brothers William Hoyt Venable (1852–1905) and Samuel Hoyt Venable (1856–1939) in DeKalb County, Georgia. The brothers owned rock quarries. Sam Venable was involved in the resurgence of the Ku Klux Klan and in the creation of the Confederate memorial on Stone Mountain, Georgia. He owned Stone Mountain, where a cross burning was held in 1915, and granted the Klan an easement to the mountain in 1923. The Venable brothers granted a 12-year lease to Stone Mountain for the carving of the Confederate memorial carving started by Gutzon Borglum.

The State of Georgia purchased the Stone Mountain property in 1958.

Granite from Stone Mountain was used for the steps to the U.S. Capitol Building, U.S. Treasury vaults, and Panama Canal locks.

Stone Mountain itself, after several transfers of ownership, was quarried for its granite, which is now found also in the capitol building in Havana, among other places.

== History ==
The Venables bought Stone Mountain in 1887 for $48,000. The brothers donated granite from Stone Mountain for a church on Peachtree and North Avenue in Atlanta.

Sam Venable's home on the northeast corner of Ponce de Leon Avenue and Oakdale Road was bought in 1959 for $60,000 by St. John's Lutheran Church.
