= New Switzerland, Georgia =

Unincorporated community in Georgia, U.S.

Coordinates: 34°32′09″N 83°27′55″W

New Switzerland is an unincorporated community in Habersham County, in the U.S. state of Georgia.

== History ==
A post office called New Switzerland was established in 1882, and remained in operation until 1889. The community was named after Switzerland, the native land of a large share of the first settlers.
