= Ansley Park =

- Ansley Park Historic District
- U.S. National Register of Historic Places
- U.S. Historic district
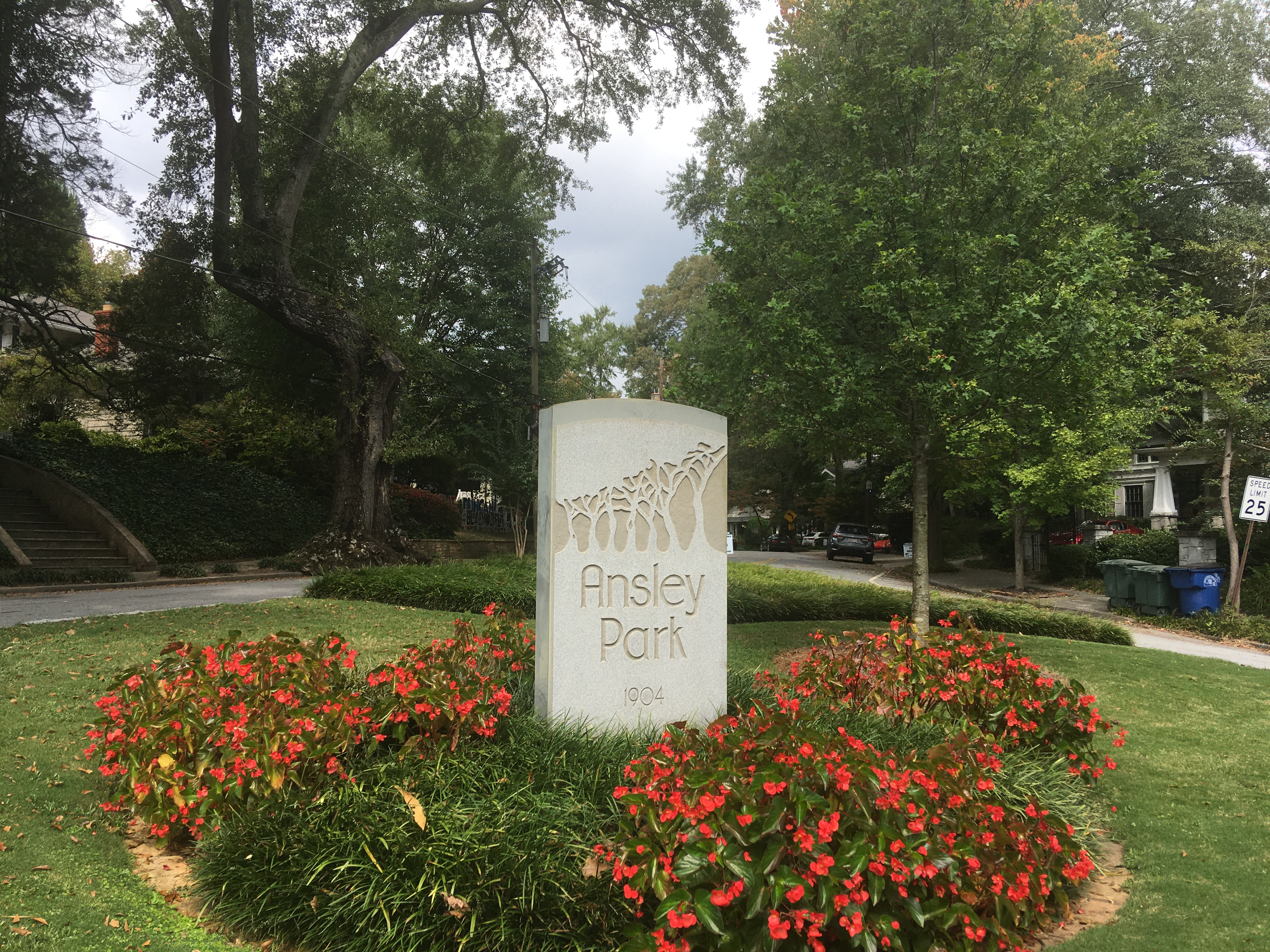

- Location within Atlanta Location within Georgia Location within the United States
- Location: Atlanta, Georgia
- Coordinates: 33°47′44″N 84°22′45″W
- Built: 1904
- Architect: Ruff, S.Z.; Reid, Neel
- Architectural style: Late 19th And Early 20th Century American Movements, Late 19th And 20th Century Revivals, Queen Anne
- NRHP reference No.: 79000717 (original); 15000466 (increase)

Significant dates
- Added to NRHP: April 20, 1979
- Boundary increase: July 27, 2015

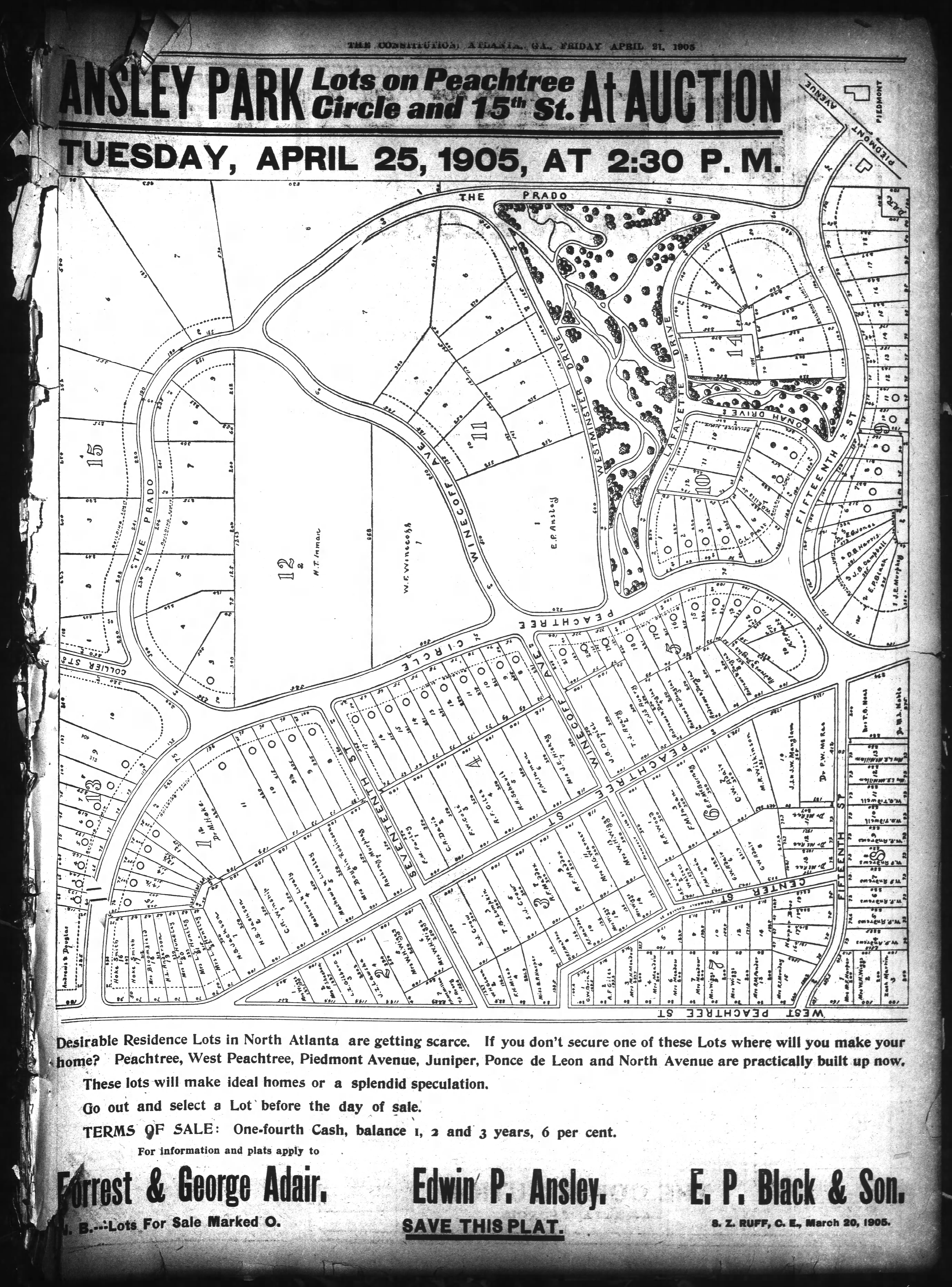
Ad from the Atlanta Constitution of April 23, 1905, featuring Ansley Park lots for sale

Ansley Park is an intown residential district in Atlanta, Georgia, located just east of Midtown and west of Piedmont Park. When developed in 1905–1908, it was the first Atlanta suburban neighborhood designed for automobiles, featuring wide, winding roads rather than the grid pattern typical of older streetcar suburbs. Streets were planned like parkways with extensive landscaping, while Winn Park and McClatchey Park are themselves long and narrow, extending deep into the neighborhood.

Ansley Golf Club borders the district. The neighborhood was largely completed by 1930 and covers 275 acres (1.11 km^{2}). It has been designated a Historic District on the National Register of Historic Places. In 2008, the median household income for the neighborhood was $226,335. To the immediate east of the golf course is the Eastside Trail interim hiking trail, part of the BeltLine ring of parks and trails around the central city.

== History ==
The area was developed by rail and real estate magnate Edwin P. Ansley, while George W. Adair, Jr. and Forrest Adair marketed the lots. It was marketed as an alternative for the city's elite to Inman Park, the most fashionable residential neighborhood in the city at the time. It was more fashionably located, astride Peachtree Street and adjacent to the city's largest public park. With Edwin Ansley's former residence serving as the governor's mansion and the Piedmont Driving Club adjacent, the area remained upscale until the 1960s when a slight decline was experienced with some residences turning into boarding houses. However, residents turned this decline around and the area never experienced the deep decline in the 1950s-1960s due to suburbanization, as neighborhoods like Inman Park did.

== Historic district ==
Contributing properties in the Historic District include:

- First Church of Christ, Scientist

== Education ==
Ansley Park residents are zoned to schools in the Atlanta Public Schools.

Zoned schools include:

- Morningside Elementary School
- Inman Middle School
- Midtown High School

== Notable people ==
- Charles Brewer, founder of MindSpring
- Tom Gugliotta, former NBA player
- Al Horford, member of the Atlanta Hawks, and wife Amelia Vega, former Miss Universe
- Lonnie Johnson, inventor of the Super Soaker, and Nerf Guns
- Hannah Salwen and Kevin Salwen, authors of The Power of Half
- Elbert Tuttle, federal judge who played a prominent role in civil rights cases
