= Virginia Highlands =

Virginia Highlands may refer to:

- Virginia-Highland, a neighborhood of Atlanta, Georgia ("Virginia Highlands" is a very common though incorrect variation of the name)
- the correct name of one of the original subdivisions of the Virginia-Highland neighborhood of Atlanta, Georgia
- the southwesternmost region of the US state of Virginia around Abingdon
- Virginia Highlands Park in Arlington, Virginia
