= Clear Creek (Atlanta) =

Stream in northeast Atlanta, Georgia, U.S.

Coordinates: 33°47′34.5″N 84°22′14.8″W

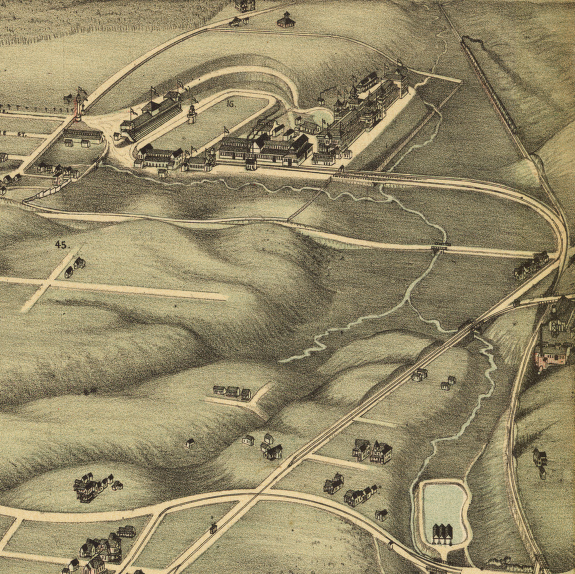
Detail from bird's-eye view of northeast Atlanta showing tributaries that form the headwaters of Clear Creek.

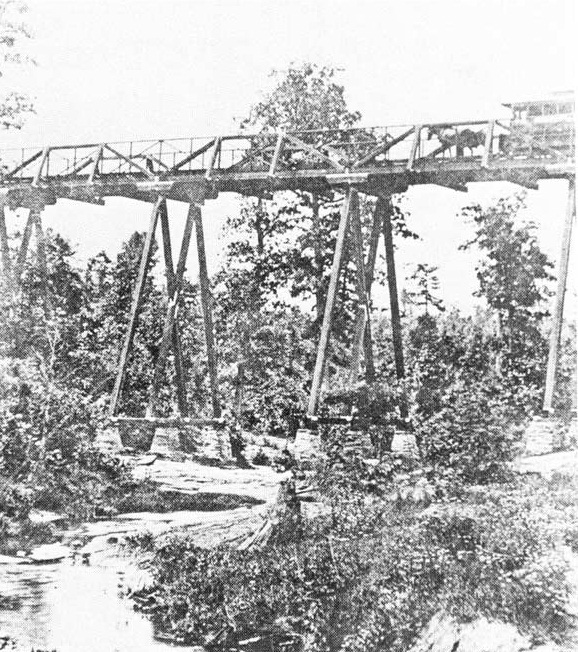
Streetcar along North Ave. crossing western branch of Clear Creek, near today's intersection of North and Penn at the boundary of what are now Midtown and the Old Fourth Ward. (Atlanta History Center)

Clear Creek is a stream in northeast Atlanta that serves as a tributary to Peachtree Creek and is part of the Chattahoochee River watershed. It has two main branches: one originating east of the high ground along Boulevard and another to the west, originating on the northeast side of downtown Atlanta.

The eastern branch of Clear Creek begins in several springs and streams located in what are now Inman Park and the Old Fourth Ward. Flowing northward, the creek is joined by additional springs and branches, including Angier Springs near the end of Belgrade Avenue and the Ponce de Leon Springs. The latter, "discovered" during railroad construction in the 1860s, inspired the name of the adjacent park and avenue.

The western branch of Clear Creek originated in the northeast quadrant of downtown Atlanta, between Decatur and Peachtree Streets. It flowed through the lowlands east of Piedmont Avenue, where the Atlanta Civic Center was constructed in the mid-1960s.

In the fall of 1864, the Union Army camped along this branch of the creek, and for several decades, it was referred to as Shermantown Branch. Flowing in a northeasterly meander through the eastern side of the Midtown neighborhood, it eventually joined the eastern branch of the creek near the site of the present-day Midtown High School stadium.

From there, the creek flows in a northerly direction, joined by several smaller tributaries. One of these tributaries originates from at least two springs—one near the Federal Reserve and another northeast of the intersection of Eighth and Juniper Streets. The water from these springs combines to form a branch that was dammed in 1894 to create Clara Meer in Piedmont Park. Today, six springs are located in the restored wetlands below the dam.

A somewhat larger branch drains Orme Park, a significant portion of the northwest side of Virginia-Highland, and the southwest side of Morningside. Known in the 19th century as Stillhouse Branch, it merges with Clear Creek a few hundred feet west of the dead end of Dutch Valley Road.

Another smaller branch drains most of Ansley Park, emptying into Clear Creek within the Ansley Golf Club's course east of Montgomery Ferry Road. Additionally, a branch from Sherwood Forest flows into Clear Creek just east of the Interstate 85 bridge.

In the mid-nineteenth century, a grist mill was located just downstream from where the BeltLine crosses the creek at the northern end of Piedmont Park. Known as Jones Mill, it was a landmark on maps from the Civil War but is often referred to as Walker's Mill, after a later owner.

For decades in the late nineteenth and early twentieth centuries, the creek was used as a sewer and polluted by industrial waste. The western branch was completely buried by the 1930s, and much of the eastern branch was buried by 1950. North of Tenth Street, the creek emerges on the east side of Piedmont Park and flows northwards, part of the way flowing through stretches of concrete channel in both Piedmont Park and the Ansley Golf Course.

== Recent efforts to improve water quality, habitat, access, and opportunities for nature appreciation ==
=== Clear Creek Basin at Historic Fourth Ward Park (2011) ===
Historic Fourth Ward Park covers 17 acres of headwaters greenspace and is located just south of Ponce City Market and just west of the BeltLine trail. Designed to provide stormwater management for an area undergoing intensive redevelopment, it was one of the first completed urban park elements of the Atlanta BeltLine project.

Construction includes a two-acre detention pond that provides relief to the City of Atlanta's combined sewer system, a 24-inch tap into the existing 9' x 9' Clear Creek trunk sewer, and the installation of nearly 1,000 linear feet of 6' x 3' box culvert. The project also involves rerouting and reconstructing city streets, building elevated walkways, extensive walls, ramps, various hardscapes, decorative railings, site lighting, wetlands plantings, and landscaping.

The pond generates a minimum of 425 gallons per minute from the submerged Clear Creek water table, which is used to maintain the park's lawns and playing fields. Additional water features include a ten-foot waterfall to aerate and recycle the pond water, and a stone water cascade that runs alongside one of the park's walkways.

=== Stream and wetland rehabilitation at Piedmont Park (2011) ===
Recent parkland expansion and multimillion-dollar green infrastructure developments (2011, 2013) managed by the Piedmont Park Conservancy are designed to improve Clear Creek's water quality and enhance biodiversity. Educational signage along the waterway provides information about the importance of healthy watershed systems.

=== Clear Creek CSO Treatment Facility at 1320 Monroe Drive (1996) ===
Comprising approximately 3,086 acres and having a maximum overflow capacity of about 5,060 million gallons per day (mgd), the Clear Creek CSO Facility serves the largest combined sewer shed of the city's seven CSO facilities, including the Downtown Business District and Midtown Atlanta. Dry weather flow (less than 40 mgd) is routed to the Peachtree interceptor, which then directs the flow to the R.M. Clayton WRC for treatment. Wet weather flow is routed to the Clear Creek CSO facility for treatment before being discharged into an open channel that leads to Clear Creek. The existing treatment process includes coarse screening, fine screening, and disinfection by sodium hypochlorite.

=== Clear Creek Nature Preserve & City of Atlanta Greenway Acquisition Project (1998 - 2007) ===
The City of Atlanta Greenway Acquisition Project was a $25 million program aimed at acquiring and protecting properties adjacent to selected rivers and creeks within the Metro Atlanta area. Once acquired, these greenway properties are to be maintained in a natural, undisturbed state permanently.

The Clear Creek Nature Preserve of the Brookwood Hills Community Club comprises 70 acres of privately held riparian bottomland, protected by a conservation easement through the Greenway Acquisition Project. The conservation of greenway properties helps protect water quality in rivers and streams, as well as animal habitats, plant habitats, and wetlands. Land adjacent to the waterways is safeguarded from erosion, flood damage, and clear-cutting.

== New urbanism style planning and redevelopment within the Clear Creek watershed and BeltLine corridor ==
=== Greater Piedmont Heights Master Framework Plan (2012) ===
Objectives:

1. Unify the various plans from different stakeholders in and around Piedmont Heights into a single, implementable Master Framework Plan that leverages community assets, respects the interests of all individuals, and follows the Hannover Principles.*

2. Modify Buford Highway, Monroe Drive, and Piedmont Road to better interface with adjacent neighborhoods and divert through traffic away from residential areas.

3. Transform the open space under I-85 and along the Peachtree Creek waterway into cultural and environmental assets.

4. Alter internal streets and intersections to improve safety and walkability, minimize vehicle/pedestrian conflicts, and encourage appropriate new development.

5. Create a plan for additional green space and a pedestrian network that connects the neighborhood to the BeltLine, nearby trails, parks, creeks, and open spaces.

6. Integrate existing and proposed public transit systems to ensure minimal disruption and optimal access.

=== Ponce City Market (2014) ===
Located where the BeltLine crosses Ponce de Leon Avenue in the Old Fourth Ward, a mixed-use development occupies the historic Sears, Roebuck & Co. building. The 2,100,000-square-foot structure is one of the largest by volume in the Southeast United States, and the building's lot spans 16 acres.

=== Armour Yards and Sweetwater Design District (2015) ===
The SweetWater Design District (2010), located around Armour Circle, Ottley Drive, and Plasters Avenue NE, was established to foster a welcoming atmosphere for visitors and to strengthen the community among businesses and organizations.

Armour Yards (2015), located near SweetWater Brewery and a future BeltLine connection, is a 6.5-acre, mixed-use, West Coast-style loft office campus developed by Third & Urban, a real estate development and investment firm.
