= Virginia–Highland Tour of Homes =

- 2012 logo
- Frequency: annually
- Inaugurated: 1972
- Organiser: Virginia–Highland Civic Association
- Website: www.vahitourofhomes.com

The Virginia–Highland Tour of Homes is an annual two-day event that happens each December in the Virginia–Highland neighborhood of Atlanta. During the event, houses around the neighborhood are open to visitors. The Virginia–Highland Civic Association organizes the event.

These include Craftsman bungalows for which Virginia–Highland is known, but may also include other styles present in the neighborhood, such as English Vernacular Revival and Colonial Revival, English Cottage and American Foursquare homes.

Local restaurants provide food tastings in each of the homes.

The 2012 tour raised about $36,000 including sponsorships, The 2011 tour was reported to have raised $27,000 in ticket sales and $33,000 overall. About $19,000 was raised in 2010, and about $16,000 in 2009. Money raised goes towards community-oriented projects such as park improvements, traffic concerns, planning and preservation.

== History ==
The Tour began in 1972 with the "Virginia–Highland Bungalow Tour", modeled after a similar tour in Inman Park, the first Intown Atlanta neighborhood to gentrify after decades of decline. Over 1000 people toured the 13 homes that were open. Bungalow-focused tours continued through 1977 and then again from 1980 to 1982. The event was revived in 2004 around a "Homes for the Holidays" theme. No tours happened in 2020.
