= 780 N. Highland Ave. =

Historic building in Atlanta, Georgia

780 North Highland Avenue
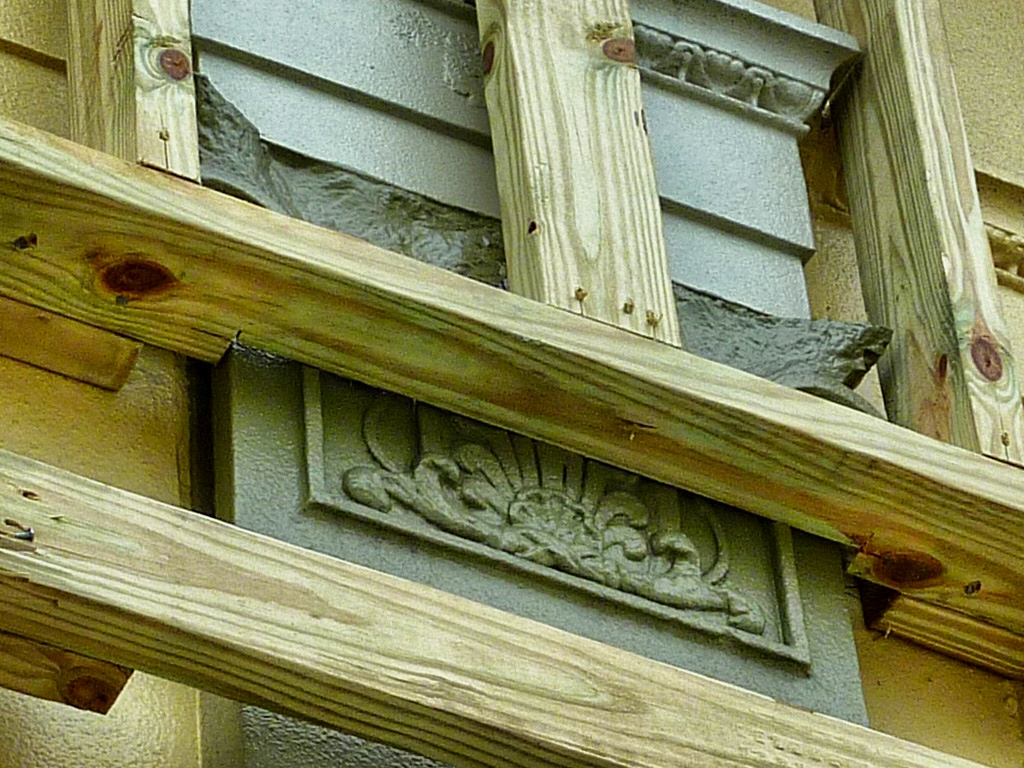
- 2012 renovation

- Location within Atlanta

General information
- Location: 780 N. Highland Ave. NE, Virginia-Highland, Atlanta, Georgia, United States
- Coordinates: 33°46′33″N 84°21′10″W
- Current tenants: Glamour Paws
- Completed: c. 1920s
- Renovated: 2012
- Landlord: Doug Landau

780 North Highland Avenue is a historic building in the Virginia-Highland neighborhood of Atlanta, Georgia. It is a contributing property to the Virginia-Highland Historic District, registered on the National Register of Historic Places. The NRHP designation, however, affords no prevention of either demolishing the building or altering its exterior—only designation as a local historic district does so.

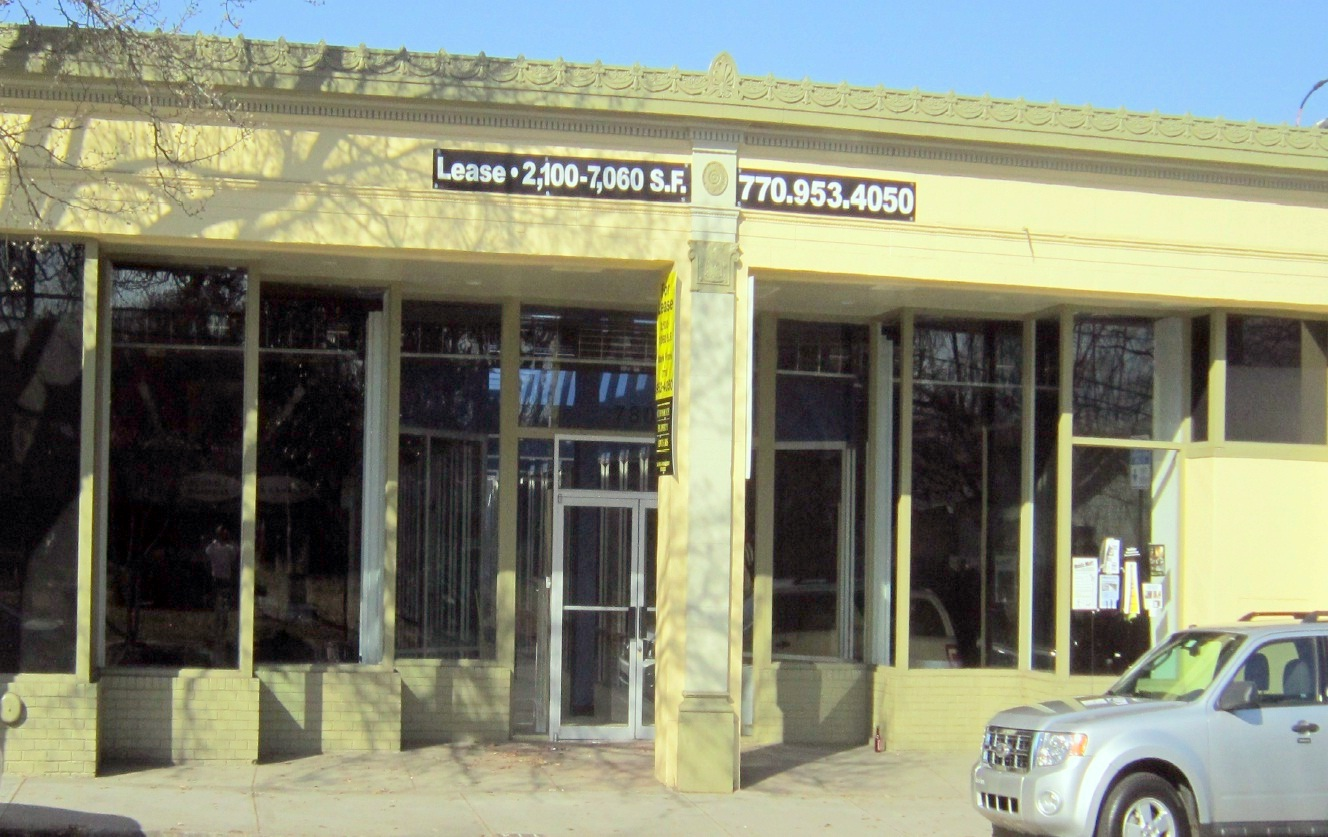
780 N. Highland Ave. in 2011 before 2012 renovation

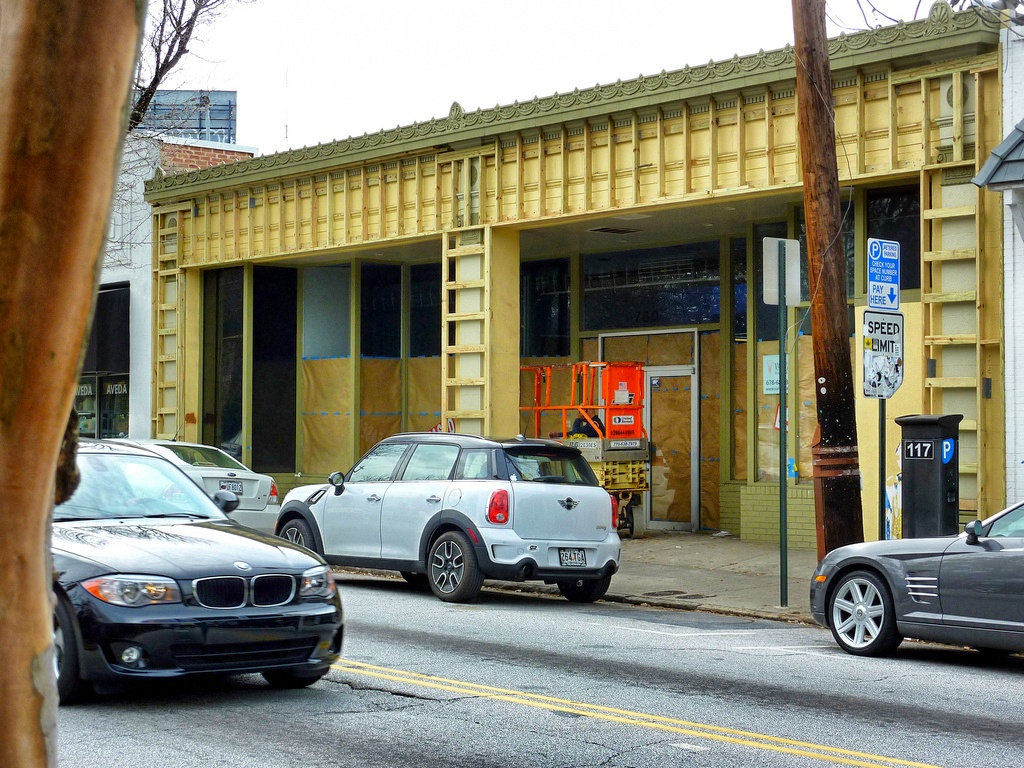
780 N. Highland Ave. during its 2012 renovation

== History ==
In June 1999, developer Doug Landau had bought the building, then known as "The Alley", and had plans to demolish it make a parking structure. The Virginia-Highland Civic Association fought against those plans, which eventually failed.

A Wolf Camera store on the site closed in 2007. In April 2012 Glamour Paws, a pet boutique, opened in the space after a controversial renovation lasting several months.

== Controversy ==
In February 2012 controversy surfaced over the renovation of the building, in which the historic details of the building were covered up under a layer of wood, over which a new façade was to be constructed. Though the historic façade was not legally protected, dozens of local residents expressed dismay at its being covered up, while a smaller group defended the merchants' right to design their storefront as they deemed best.

== Filming on location ==
In April 2012 portions of the pilot for the B.E.T. network's Being Mary Jane were filmed here.

Portions of the Bravo television series Married to Medicine were filmed here in 2013.
