= Maiden Trail =

Maiden Trail is a privately owned trail, formerly an unpaved alley, in the Atlanta neighborhood of Virginia-Highland. In 2014, residents cleaned up and beautified the unpaved alley between St. Charles Avenue and Ponce de Leon Avenue, between Frederica and Barnett avenues.
