= Green B. Adair =

American politician

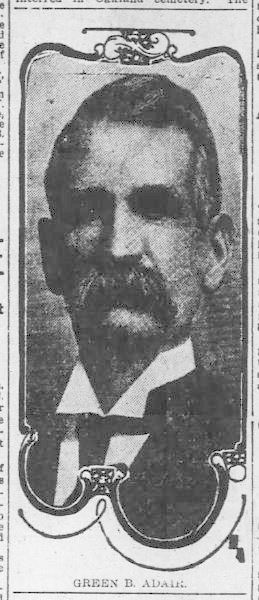
- Born: 1840; Talladega County, Alabama, U.S.
- Died: April 20, 1914 (aged 73)
- Resting place: Oakland Cemetery (Atlanta)

Green Buren Adair (1840 - April 20, 1914) was a prominent cotton merchant in Atlanta, conducting business there from the Civil War era until the turn of the 20th century. He was a cousin of George Washington Adair, another prominent real estate mogul in Atlanta.

Adair was born in Talladega County, Alabama. He served in the Confederate Army including the Battle of Appomattox Courthouse. Adair settled in Atlanta in 1866 and entered the wholesale commission and fertilizer business together with his brother Augustus D. Adair (1835–1922), and in a few years became one of Atlanta's most successful merchants. 1890 property tax records indicate that he owned $26,500 worth of property. He retired from active business in 1891, when his eldest son, Green B. Adair Jr. (b. 1887 d. 1968), was still a toddler, but remained active in Atlanta charities and business affairs.

In the 1880s and 1890s he served on the Atlanta City Council. He was instrumental in building the Second Baptist Church, which was located at Washington and Mitchell streets, and later joined the Highland Park Baptist Church, which opened in 1908 on Highland Avenue at the northwest corner of Highland and Greenwood avenues.

The Adairs lived on fashionable Washington Street as of 1891, but in 1892 Adair acquired 16 acres (6.5 ha) of land for $17,000 at the southwest corner of Highland and Virginia avenues in what is today Virginia-Highland neighborhood of Atlanta. The land was in the country at the time, but easily accessed by the new Nine-Mile Circle streetcar line. Adair had a summer house built on the site, which was completed in 1895. In 1911 the family moved in permanently. The Adair Mansion remains a landmark and is divided into apartments. (It is now located on Rupley Avenue as bungalows were built on the land between the mansion and the Virginia-Highland intersection.)

He died in Atlanta on April 20, 1914, of a paralytic stroke. His obituary described him as "one of Atlanta’s most beloved citizens," known for his acts of charity and in the business world as a man of sterling character, energetic and progressive." He was buried in Oakland Cemetery.
