= New Highland Park =

Park in Atlanta, Georgia, United States

Coordinates: 33.7756°N 84.3523°W

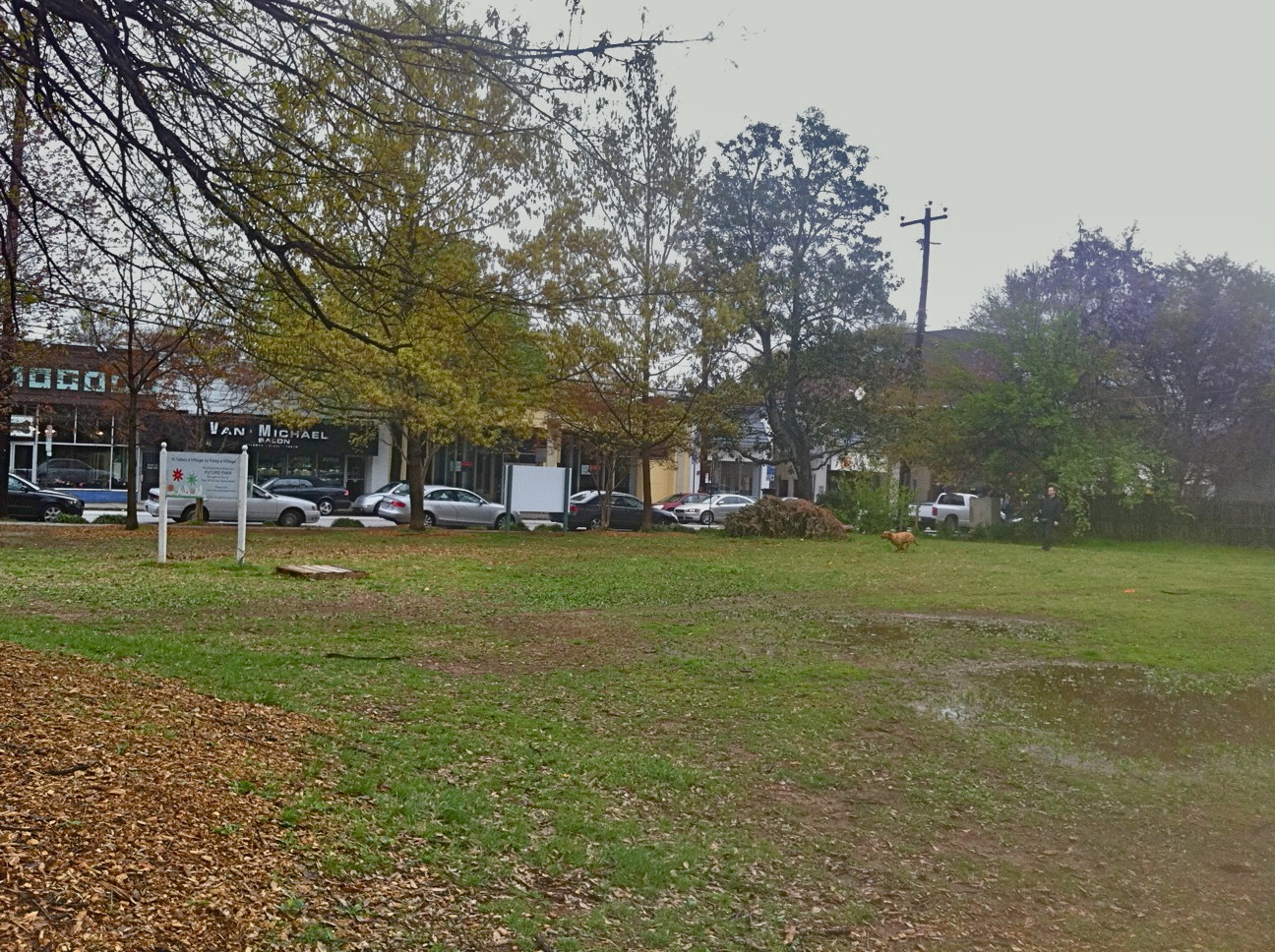
View towards N. Highland Ave. from St. Charles Pl.

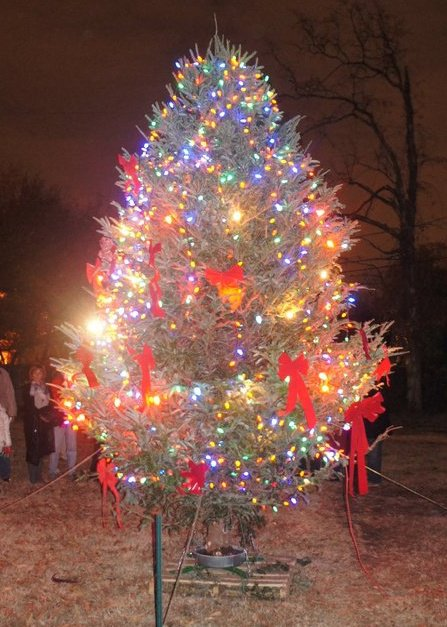
Christmas Tree at New Highland Park, December 2010

New Highland Park is a small 0.41 acre park at the northeast corner of North Highland Avenue and St. Charles Place in the historic Atkins Park neighborhood of Atlanta, often considered a part of the larger Virginia Highland neighborhood.

The park was originally the site of two adjacent lots, 1076 and 1082 St. Charles Place. 1082 was a house. In 1952 the house was demolished and the Highland Branch of the Atlanta Public Library was built on the two lots. The library was enlarged in 1976 and demolished in 1990. In December 2008 the Virginia Highland Civic Association bought the land.

The park is undeveloped as of March 2011. However, there are plans to develop it into an eco-friendly park and rain garden. The project is planned to function as a demonstration project for managing storm water through bioretention. Bioretention involves capturing the water on site with the help of native Georgia plants, which naturally remove pollutants from water. The water goes back into the water table instead of into storm drains and being lost.
