= The Colonnades =

Condominium buildings in Atlanta, Georgia, US

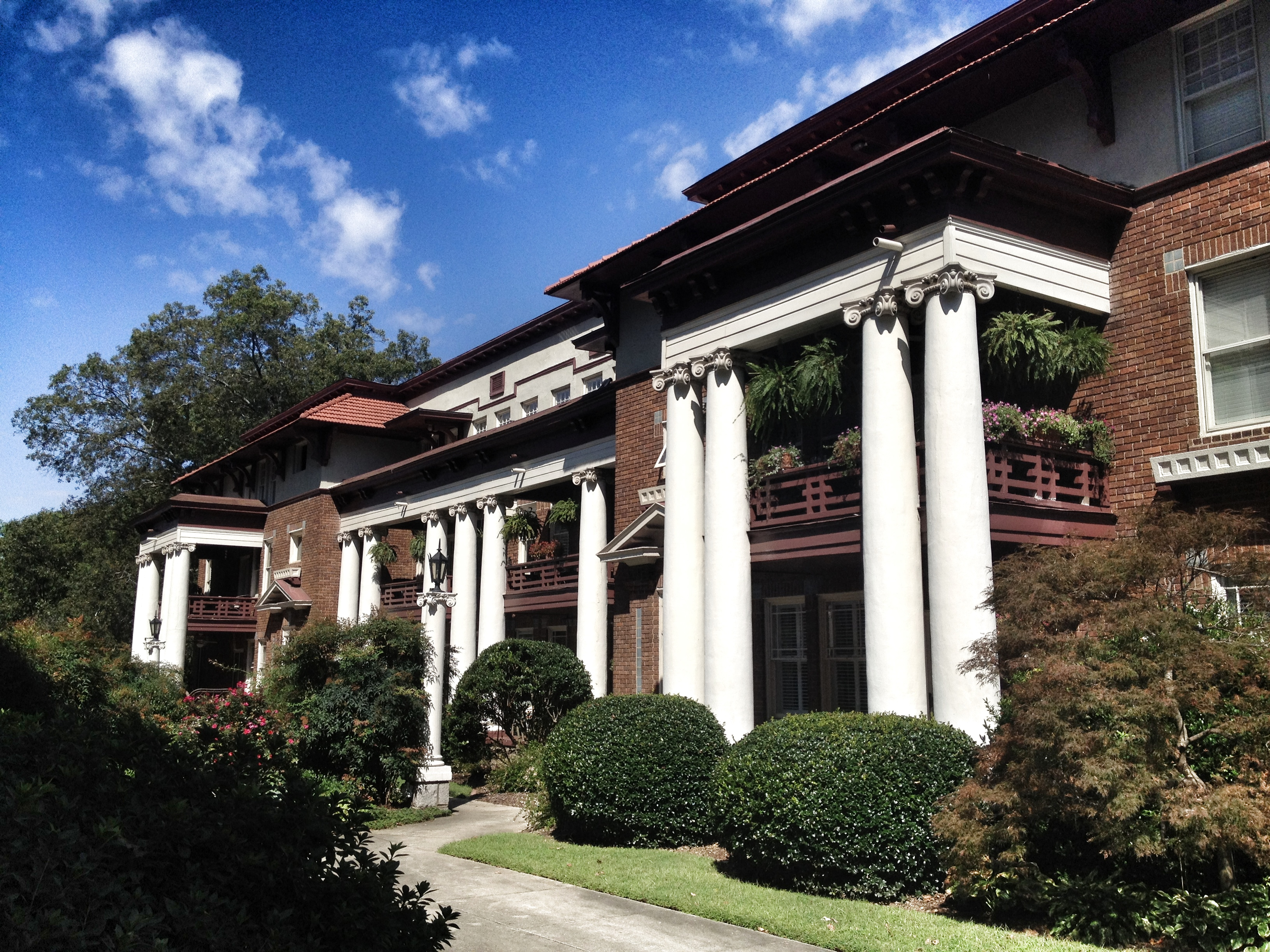
- Interactive map of the The Colonnades area

General information
- Coordinates: 33.7747°N 84.3529°W
- Construction started: 1916
- Completed: 1918

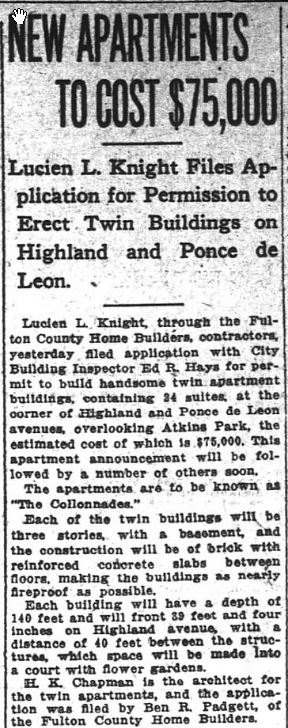
Atlanta Constitution article from February 12, 1916 about The Colonnades

The Colonnades are condominium buildings at 734–746 North Highland Avenue in the Virginia-Highland neighborhood of Atlanta, Georgia. They are a contributing property to the Virginia-Highland Historic District, registered on the National Register of Historic Places.

The complex consists of two three-story buildings with 12 apartments each. The American Institute of Architects' guide to Atlanta architecture states that they are one of the best examples of garden apartment in Atlanta:

Two structures perpendicular to North Highland Avenue, frame a hansomely landscaped courtyard with Mediterranean-style shrubbery. An Italianate flavor is further enhanced by the tiles of the boldly projecting decorative roofs and the stucco of the attic, pierced with smaller openings than the two floors below

Furthermore, the AIA notes the complex's eponymous overscaled white columns which contrast prominently against the red brick background. It characterizes some elements as prescient of postmodern architecture, such as the broken pediments enhancing the raised doorways and the brick and terra-cotta frame of the square openings.

In 1916, Lucian Lamar Knight inherited land near Ponce de Leon Avenue and St. Charles Ave. and subdivided it. On two adjacent lots he built the Colonnades at a cost of $75,000. Knight was a historian, prominent journalist and literary editor for the Atlanta Constitution, as well as founder and first director or the Georgia Archives.
