= North Highland Mile =

Annual race & block party in Atlanta, Georgia, USA

The North Highland Mile (formerly Morningside Mile) is an annual race and block party that takes place in March or April in the Virginia Highland and Morningside neighborhoods of Atlanta along North Highland Avenue.
