= Atkins Park =

- Atkins Park District
- U.S. National Register of Historic Places
- U.S. Historic district
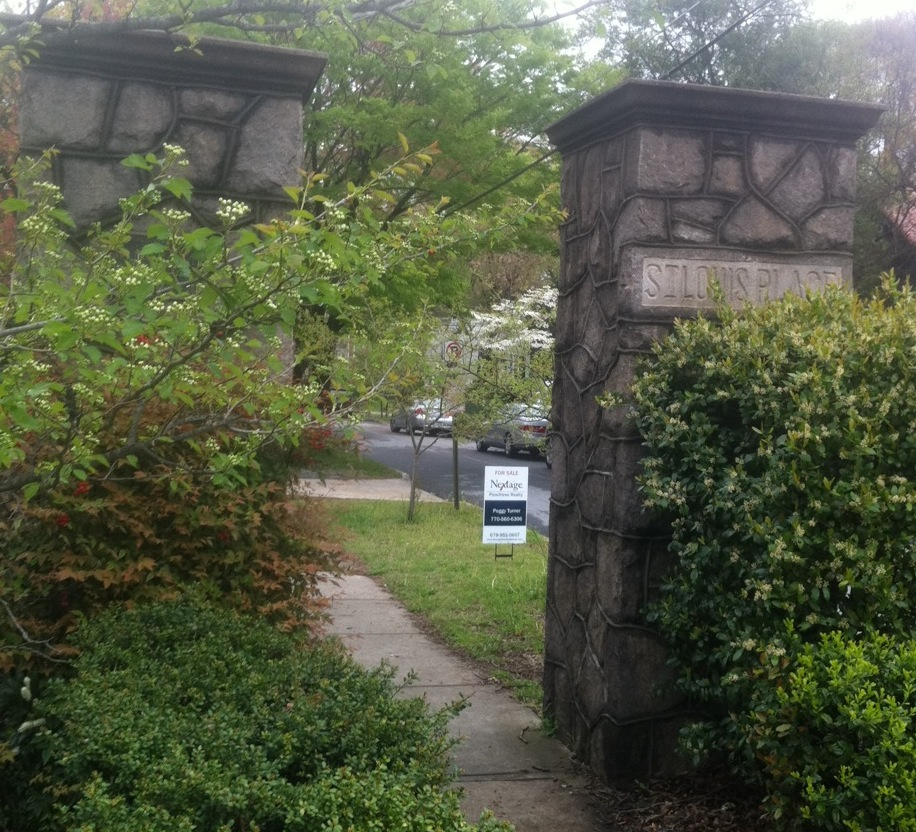
- Atkins Park gateway at St. Louis Place

- Location within Atlanta Location within Georgia Location within the United States
- Location: St. Augustine Place, St. Charles Place, and St. Louis Place between N. Highland Ave. and Briarcliff Rd., Atlanta, Georgia
- Coordinates: 33°46′31″N 84°21′1″W
- Area: 27 acres (11 ha)
- Built: 1912
- Architect: Edwin Wiley Grove, Knox T. Thomas
- Architectural style: Colonial Revival, Bungalow/Craftsman, Tudor Revival
- NRHP reference No.: 82004619
- Added to NRHP: August 30, 1982

Atkins Park is an intown neighborhood of Atlanta, Georgia, nestled against the southeast corner of the neighborhood of Virginia-Highland, west of Briarcliff Avenue and north of Ponce de Leon Avenue ("Ponce"). It consists of just three streets—St. Louis Place, St. Charles Place, and St. Augustine Place—as well as an internal sidewalk known as Malcolm's Way (in honor of the local citizen most associated with it) that bisects them from St. Charles to St. Louis. It was originally designed to give quicker access to the streetcar stop at Ponce.

== History ==
The first use of the land after its formal platting was farmland. Between 1902 and 1905, Edwin Wiley Grove (a St. Louis businessman who later developed the famous Grove Park Inn and the Grove Arcade in Asheville, North Carolina) purchased the land. Grove plowed profits from his pharmaceutical company into real estate for the development of neighborhoods. Development of Atkins Park began in 1912 as a streetcar suburb of Atlanta, linked to downtown via the Nine-Mile Circle streetcar line. The original name was St. Louis Park; it was changed "to honor a family friend and mentor": Colonel John DeWitt Clinton Atkins, a representative of Tennessee in both the U.S. Congress and the Confederate Congress.

A 27-acre (11 ha) section of Atkins Park has been listed on the National Register of Historic Places since 1982.

== Government ==
Atkins Park has its own community association, called APNA. For purposes of formal civic participation in matters that go before the city's Neighborhood Planning Unit (NPU-F, in this case), Atkins Park is part of the Virginia-Highland neighborhood and its association Virginia-Highland Civic Association (VHCA). APNA provides a member of its own choice to the VHCA Board.

== Park ==
North Highland Park, a small 0.41-acre park purchased by the VHCA in 2008 and formally opened in 2012, is located on the site of a former public library at the northeast corner of St. Charles Place and North Highland Avenue.
