= Orme Park =

Park in Atlanta, United States

Coordinates: 33.785632°N 84.361603°W

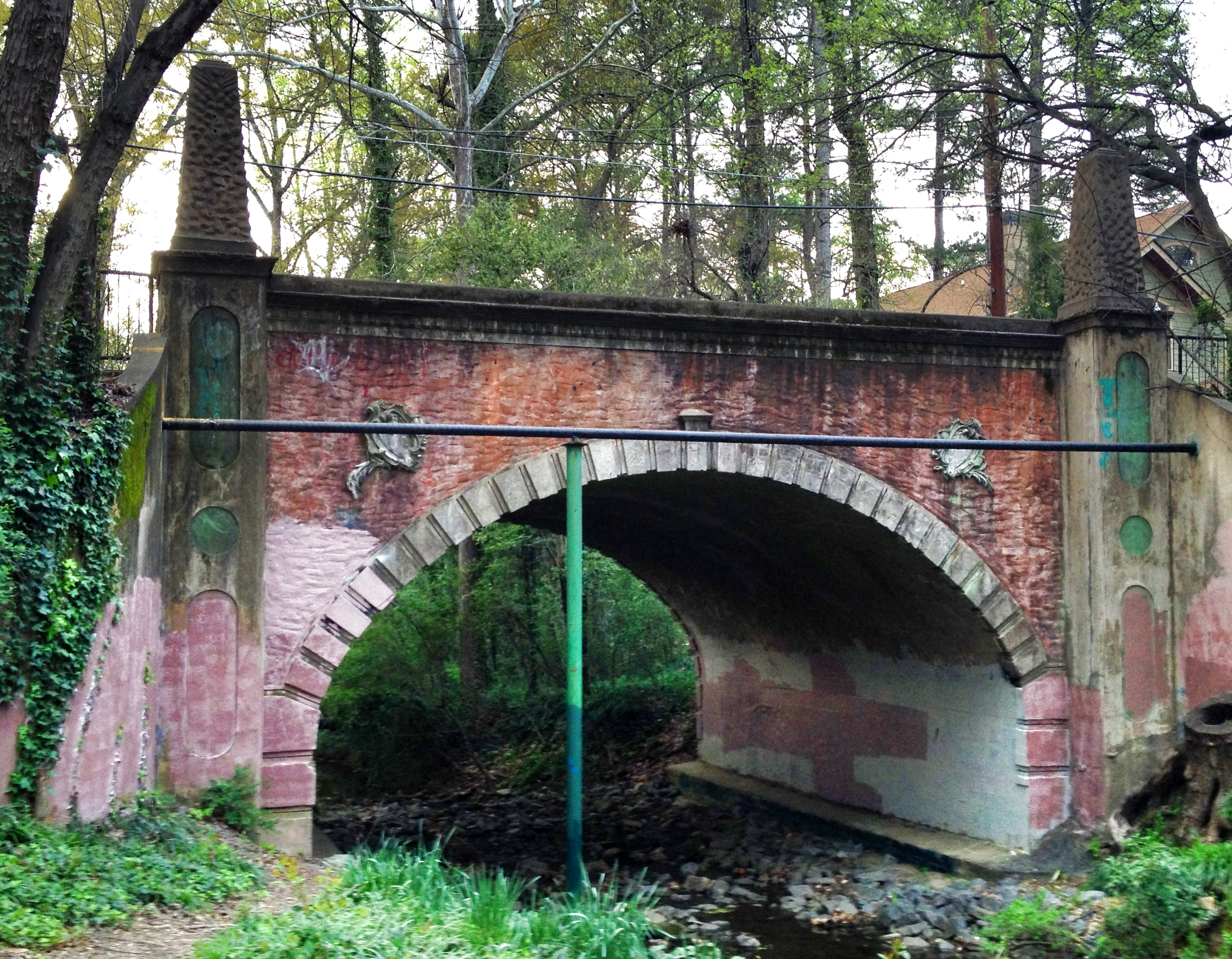
Bridge over Stillhouse Branch in Orme Park

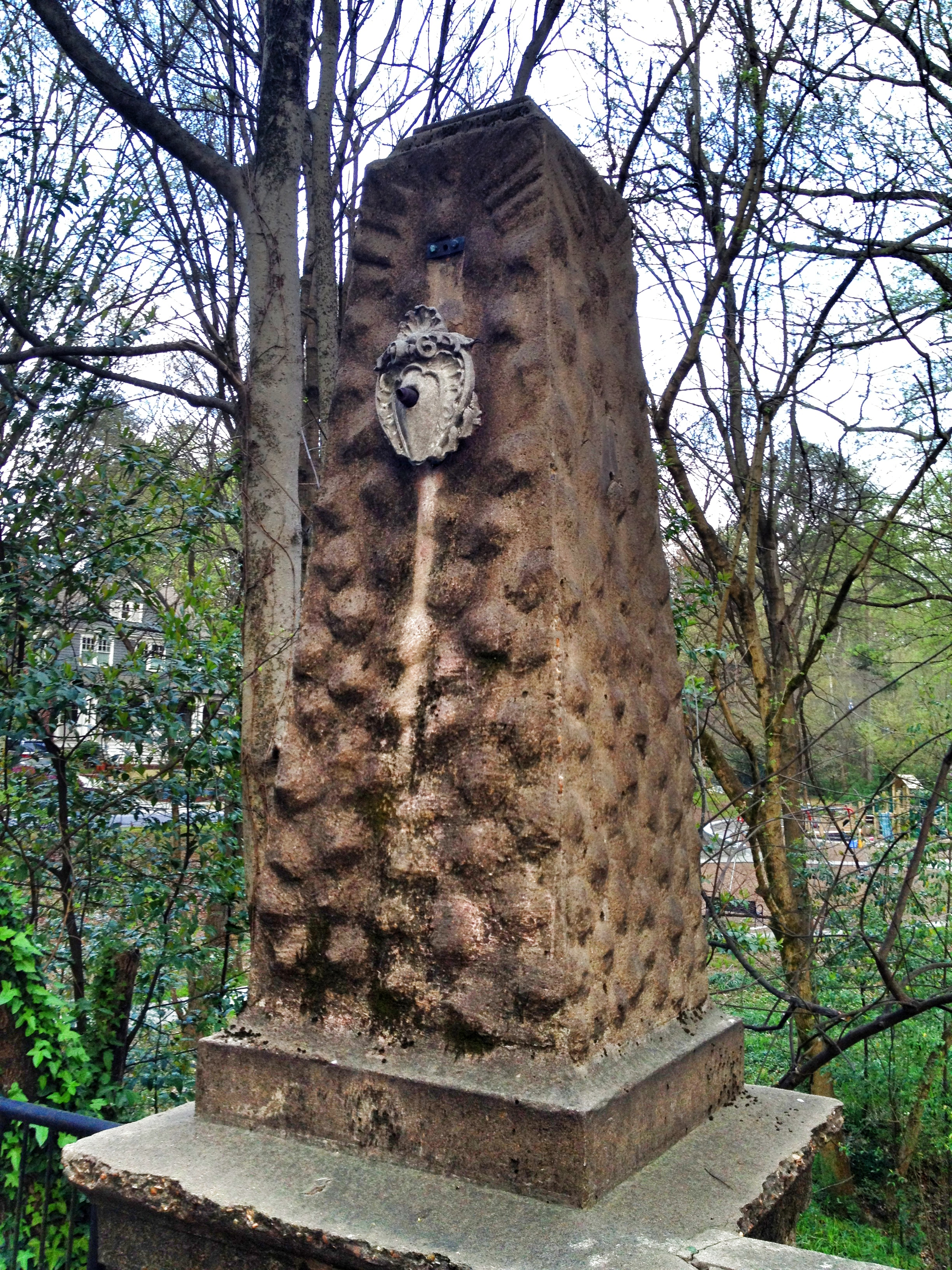
Column of bridge

Orme Park is a 6.6-acre (2.7 ha) park in Atlanta, Georgia. It is located along Stillhouse Branch, also called Orme Creek, in the Virginia Highland neighborhood.

== 2011 renovation ==
In 2011 a $203,000 renovation was completed, funded by "Friends of Orme Park", the Virginia-Highland Conservation League, the City of Atlanta, and a grant from Park Pride. This change consisted of a new entry plaza, stairway, and gently sloping sidewalks that provide wheelchair access and a safer landing area for entry into the park off Brookridge Drive. The playground was relocated and a granite seating wall was built. A walkway connecting the two entrances on Brookridge Drive was constructed where a dirt path previously existed. An additional Park Pride grant will enable completion in 2012 of tree recompense, a rain garden and granite seat wall, additional plantings, and a new masonry sign.
