= Fire Station 19 (Atlanta, Georgia) =

Fire station in Georgia, United States

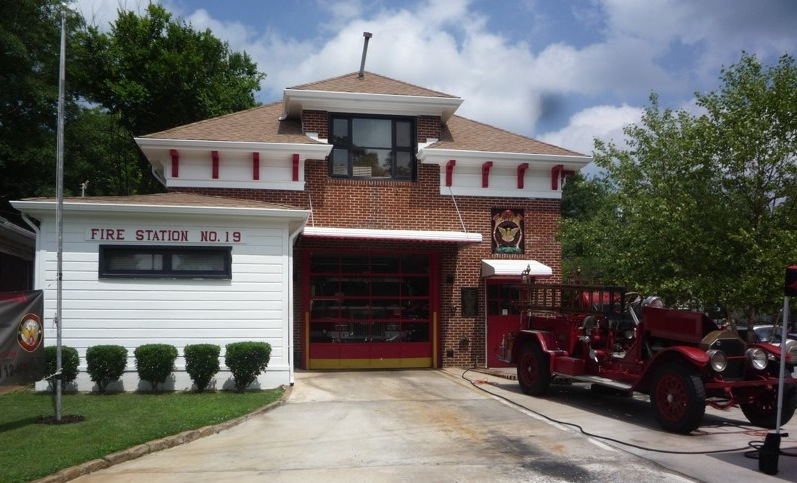
- Fire Station 19
- Interactive map of the Fire Station 19 area

General information
- Location: Atlanta, Georgia, United States
- Coordinates: 33.7836°N 84.3543°W
- Inaugurated: 1924

Website
- http://www.vhfirecompany.com

Fire Station 19 is Atlanta's oldest operating fire station. It is located at 1063 N. Highland Ave. in the heart of the Virginia Highland neighborhood of Atlanta. It was built in 1924 in the bungalow style prevalent in Virginia Highland, and is considered a neighborhood landmark.

The fire station provides a number of additional community services such as a car-seat installations and safety checks, blood-pressure monitoring, safe shelter for women in need, and a monthly storytime for children. The station is part of the Atlanta Fire Department.

== History ==
Subdivisions were built in Virginia Highland starting in 1909, with most completed by 1926. The rise in population led to the need to build a fire station to "furnish adequate fire protection to that rapidly growing community". In September and October 1924 the city and county appropriated funds for the $28,000 project.

== Restoration and renovation project ==
As of 2010, maintenance on the firehouse has been deferred for years. There is termite damage to the staircase, there are holes in the ceiling, and water collects on the floor of the garage due to lack of a drain.
