= St. Charles-Greenwood =

Coordinates: 33.776°N 84.359°W

St. Charles-Greenwood is a former neighborhood of northeastern Atlanta, named after St. Charles and Greenwood avenues. Ponce de Leon Place and North Highland Avenue were the western and eastern boundaries. The neighborhood It had its own neighborhood association in the 1980s, and in the 1990s had its own seat on the Virginia-Highland Civic Association board. Around 2003 the neighborhood was fully absorbed into the Virginia-Highland neighborhood. Atlanta city maps up to approximately 2007 still show the neighborhood, but current city maps and neighborhood lists do not.
