= Green B. Adair Mansion =

Coordinates: 33.780986°N 84.354993°W

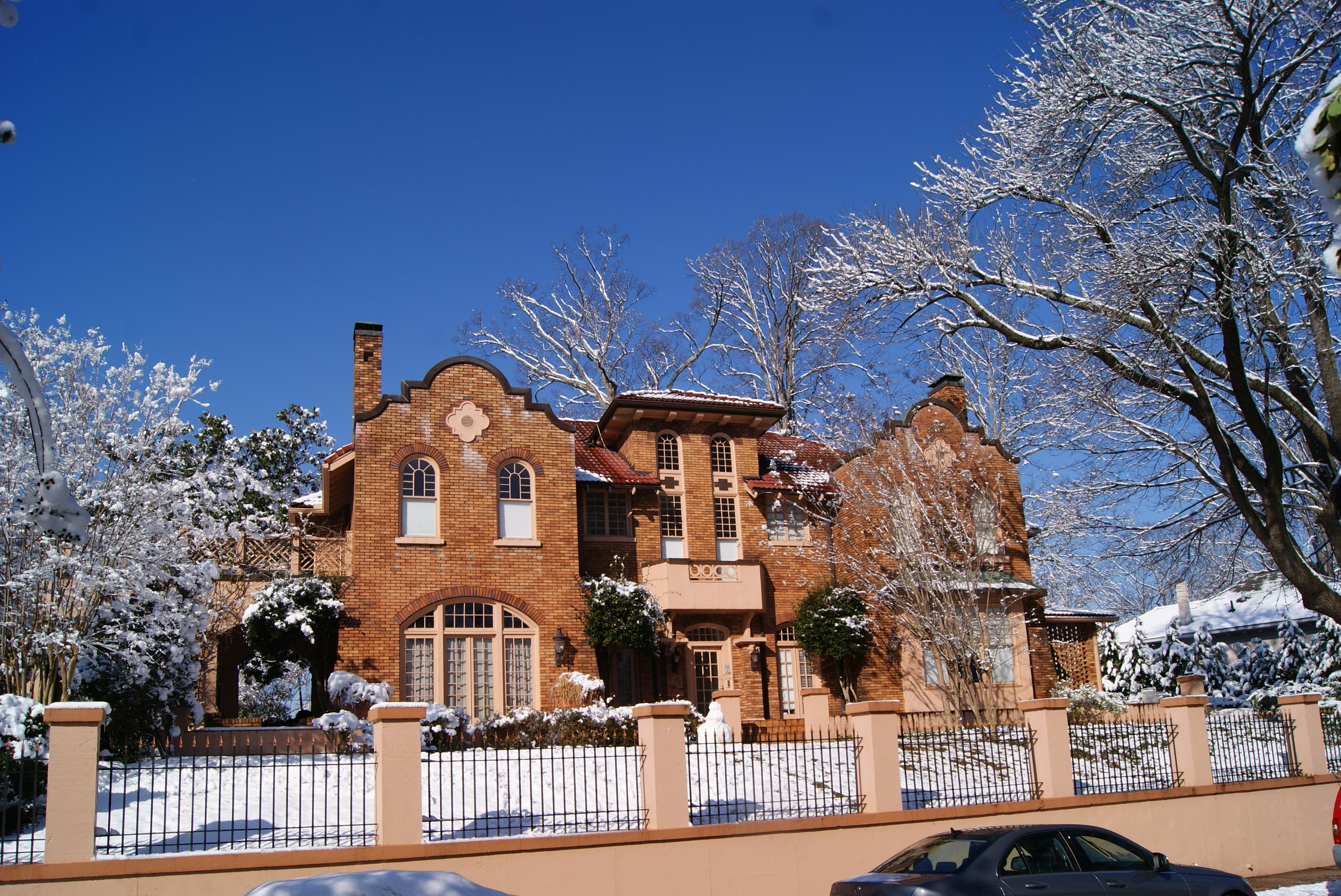
Adair Mansion at 964 Rupley Dr. in the Virginia Highland neighborhood of Atlanta

The Adair Mansion, originally named Wood Cliff (1895) is located in the Virginia Highland neighborhood of Atlanta, Georgia at 964 Rupley Drive, and is as of 2011 divided into upscale apartments.

Green Buren Adair (c. 1837-1914, Atlanta), a wholesale commission and fertilizer tycoon, acquired the 16 acres (6.5 ha) of land in 1892 for $17,000. The land was in the country at the time, but easily accessed by the new Nine-Mile Circle streetcar line. The house was completed in 1895 and served as the family's summer house until 1911 when they moved in permanently.

The Mediterranean-style house and grounds were nearly turned into a country club with tennis courts and a golf course. Instead, the grounds were turned into the Vineyard Park subdivision in 1911. This is an area of bungalow-style houses bounded by Adair Ave., Todd Rd., Virginia Ave., and N. Highland Ave.
