= Hardy Ivy =

Hardy Ivy (1779–1842) is said to be the first person of European descent to permanently settle in what is now the city of Atlanta, Georgia.

== Settlement ==
By 1821 the last of the Native Americans who held claim to the land east of the Chattahoochee River ceded their land to the state of Georgia in the "Creek Indian Cession of 1821". West of the Chattahoochee remained Cherokee territory. Shortly thereafter the land was divided into square land lots of 202½ acres each. In 1833 Ivy, from the Abbeville district of South Carolina, purchased Land Lot 51 of the 14th district of what was then Dekalb County from James Paden for the sum of $225.

Ivy built a double log cabin near where the Marriott Marquis hotel now stands at the corner of Courtland and Ellis Street presumably shortly after he acquired the land. At that time DeKalb County included all of what is now Fulton County in which most of Atlanta City limits currently resides and the lot itself is now bounded by Edgewood on the south, Park Pl. and Peachtree on the west, a line south of Ralph McGill on the north and old Fort St. on the east. His land lot was on the northeastern edge of the heart of the original downtown Atlanta. It is presumed that Mr. Paden had not occupied the land previous to selling it to Mr. Ivy.

At the time Ivy could not have known that his new real estate acquisition was destined to become the center of a major city. As the driving force behind the growth of the town that eventually became Atlanta was its location as the terminus point of the Western and Atlantic Railroad which was chartered by the State Legislature of Georgia on December 21, 1836.

Surveying for the railroad was begun in 1837 and by 1838 the now famous 'zero mile post' marking its termination was placed in Land Lot 78 - just west of Ivy's holdings.

== Death ==
He was thrown from his horse and killed during the winter of 1841–1842. His estate was valued at $714.67.

Ivy Street which is in the immediate vicinity of his cabin was named in his honor and remained so named until late in the 20th century when Ivy Street was renamed Peachtree Center Avenue to honor the newly developed mixed use building complex designed by John Portman. Hardy Ivy Park (33°45′46″N 84°23′15″W) in Downtown Atlanta also commemorates Ivy.

== Other early settlers ==
Even though Ivy and his wife (Sarah Todd Ivy 1782–1886) were the first settlers within the area which was to become downtown Atlanta there were earlier settlers in the immediate vicinity, most notably Sarah Todd Ivy's brother and his wife - Richard Copeland Todd and Martha Todd. The Todd family had settled nearby in 1823, ten years before Hardy Ivy purchased his land. But their landlot was just outside the original Atlanta city limits when the city was incorporated by charter on December 29, 1847. The Todd's land lot (17 of the 14th district, also 202½ acres) encompassed much of what is now known as the neighborhood of Virginia-Highland and is well within the present city limits of Atlanta. One of the oldest known roads in Atlanta 'Todd Road' is clearly indicated on many civil war maps and its route is a direct connection between the Ivy Homestead and the Todd's. A small portion of 'Todd Road' still exists in Virginia Highland.

== Bibliography ==
- Shavin, Norman (1984). Whatever Became of Atlanta?. Capricorn.
