= Richard Copeland Todd =

American pioneer from Chester, South Carolina

Richard Copeland Todd (1792–1852) was an American pioneer from Chester, South Carolina.

In 1822 he and his wife Martha settled in what is now the Virginia Highland neighborhood of Atlanta, buying their farm from William Zachary, who had bought it in 1812. Their descendants resided on the original Todd homestead site at 816 Greenwood Avenue until the 1960s. The Todds were buried nearby, but their graves were relocated to an actual cemetery in the 1950s. A large stone "log" approximately 6 feet (1.8 m) long and bearing the inscriptions "Martha Todd 1802–1896" and "Richard Todd 1792–1853" (it was marked with the incorrect death year) was left behind because it was too heavy to move at the time.

Todd's older sister Sarah (d. 1865) was married to Hardy Ivy, the first European-American settler within the original Atlanta city limits. The road between their two farms was known as Todd Road, a portion of which still exists in Virginia Highland.
