= Virginia–Highland =

Neighborhood in Atlanta, Georgia

Virginia-Highland
- Neighborhoods of Atlanta
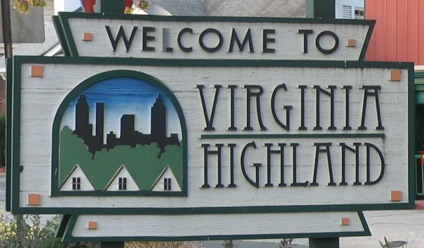
- Sign at Virginia Ave. and N. Highland Ave.
- Nickname: VaHi
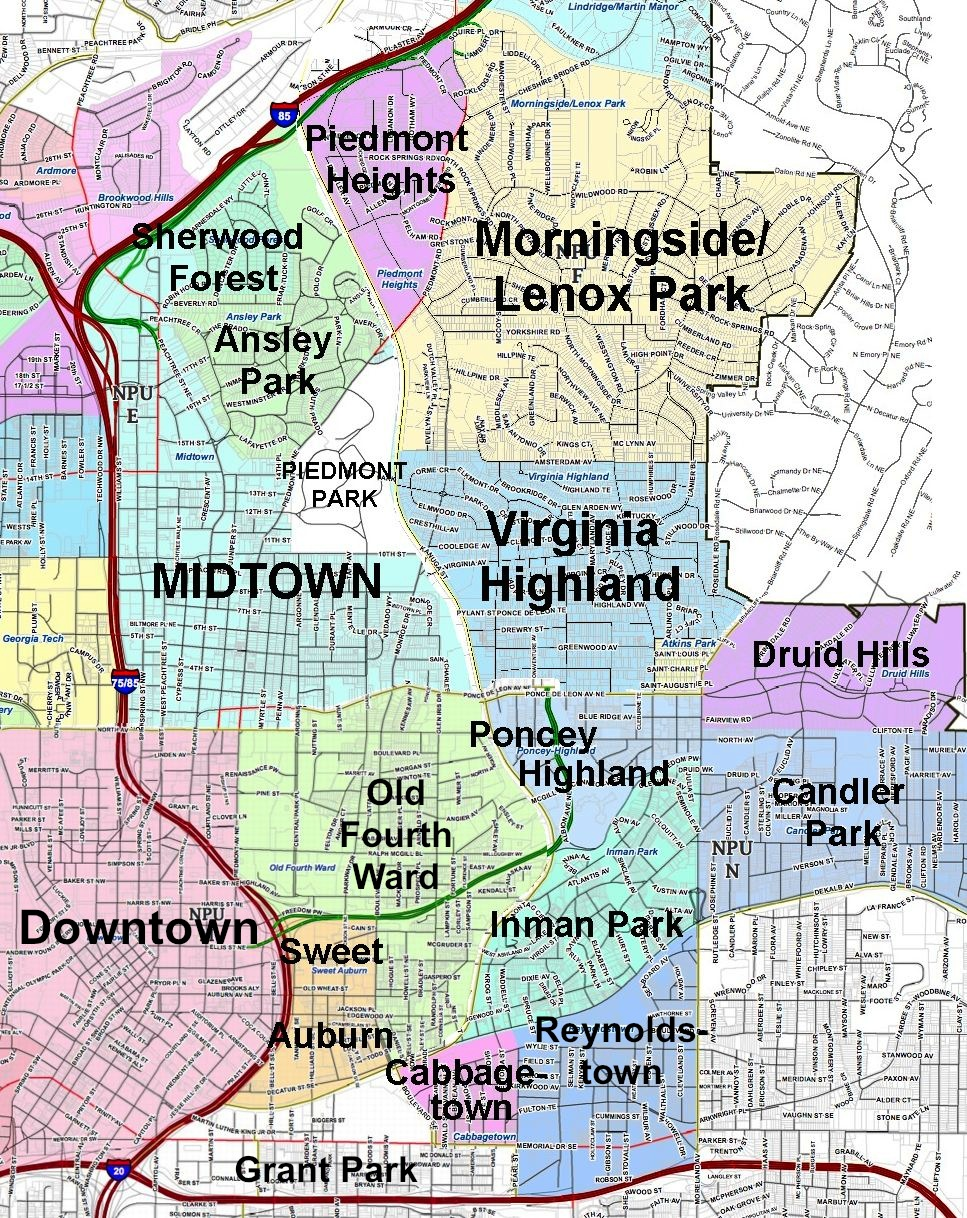
- Virginia Highland location relative to downtown Atlanta
- Coordinates: 33°46′56.64″N 84°21′15.48″W
- Country: United States
- State: Georgia
- County: Fulton County
- City: City of Atlanta
- Council District: 6
- NPU: F

Government
  - City Council: Alex Wan

Area
  - Total: 0.95625 sq mi (2.4767 km^{2})

Population (2010)
  - Total: 7,800
  - Density: 8,200/sq mi (3,100/km^{2})
- Source: 2010 U.S. census figures as tabulated by WalkScore
- ZIP Code: 30306
- Website: Virginia Highland Civic Association
- Virginia Highland Historic District
- U.S. National Register of Historic Places
- U.S. Historic district
- Location: bounded roughly by Amsterdam Ave., Rosedale Rd., Ponce de Leon Avenue and the BeltLine Eastside Trail, Atlanta, Georgia
- Coordinates: 33°46′56.64″N 84°21′15.48″W
- Area: 612 acres (248 ha)
- Built: 1899-1955
- Architect: A. Ten Eyck Brown, G. Lloyd Preacher, Owens James Southwell, Leila Ross Wilburn
- Architectural style: Bungalow/Craftsman
- NRHP reference No.: 05000402
- Added to NRHP: May 10, 2005

Virginia–Highland (often nicknamed "VaHi") is a neighborhood of Atlanta, Georgia, founded in the early 20th century as a streetcar suburb. It is named after the intersection of Virginia Avenue and North Highland Avenue, the heart of its trendy retail district at the center of the neighborhood. The neighborhood is famous for its bungalows and other historic houses from the 1910s to the 1930s. It has become a destination for people across Atlanta with its eclectic mix of restaurants, bars, and shops as well as for the Summerfest festival, annual Tour of Homes and other events.

In 2011, readers of Creative Loafing voted Virginia–Highland "Best Overall Neighborhood." In June 2011, Atlanta Magazine designated Virginia Highland "favorite neighborhood overall". In 2012, readers of Creative Loafing voted VaHi "Best Walkable Neighborhood". In 2020, Southern Living editors named Virginia–Highland number 4 on their “The South’s Best Neighborhoods” list.

== Name ==
Newspaper articles from the early 1920s refer to the "Virginia Highland" section of Atlanta with regard to the area around the intersection of Virginia and Highland avenues. Later in the 1920s, southeast of this intersection, the "Virginia Highlands" (with an "s") subdivision was built. However, neither term appeared again in the press until the 1970s.

During the revolt against the construction of the I-485 freeway through Morningside and what is now Virginia–Highland, a pro-highway group called themselves the "Highland–Virginia Civic Association", claiming to speak for the neighborhood. When Joe Drolet and other residents formed a group to oppose the highway in Fall 1971, they chose the name "Virginia–Highland Civic Association". With the victory of the anti-highway forces, the Virginia–Highland name stuck and the press started to use it to refer to the entire neighborhood between Amsterdam, Ponce, Piedmont Park and Druid Hills.

Around Atlanta, "Virginia–Highland", "Virginia Highlands" and "the Highlands" are all commonly heard. However, "Virginia–Highland" is the official name of the neighborhood. The other terms are included in some business names, but are technically incorrect.

The term VaHi, imitating the New York style of naming neighborhoods (SoHo, TriBeCa), first was used in the Atlanta newspapers in 1998. It is now in common use as a shortened, playful form or in URLs of neighborhood media and organizations (examples are www.vahi.org).

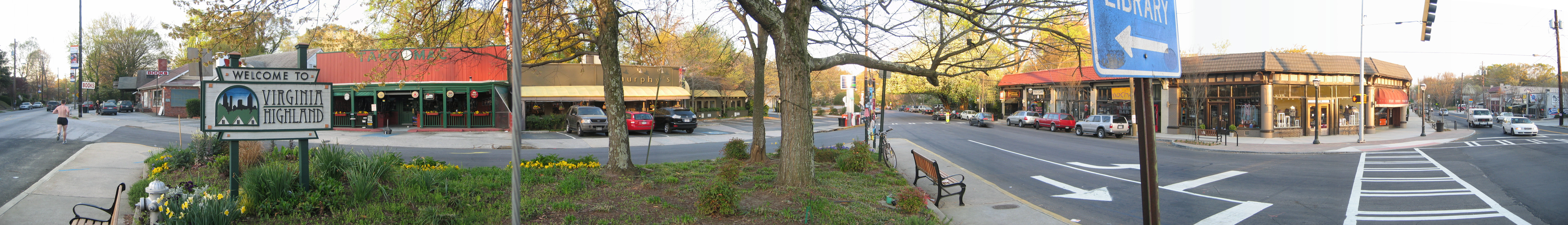
Intersection of Virginia and North Highland avenues, March 2007

== History ==
The first record of settlement of the area that is now Virginia–Highland was in 1812, when William Zachry bought and built a farm on 202.5 acres (0.819 km^{2}) of land there. In 1822, he sold his farm to Richard Copeland Todd (1792–1850). Todd's brother-in-law Hardy Ivy settled in 1832 in what is now Downtown Atlanta and the road between their two farms came to be known as Todd Road (a portion of which still exists in Virginia–Highland).

=== "Nine Mile Circle" ===
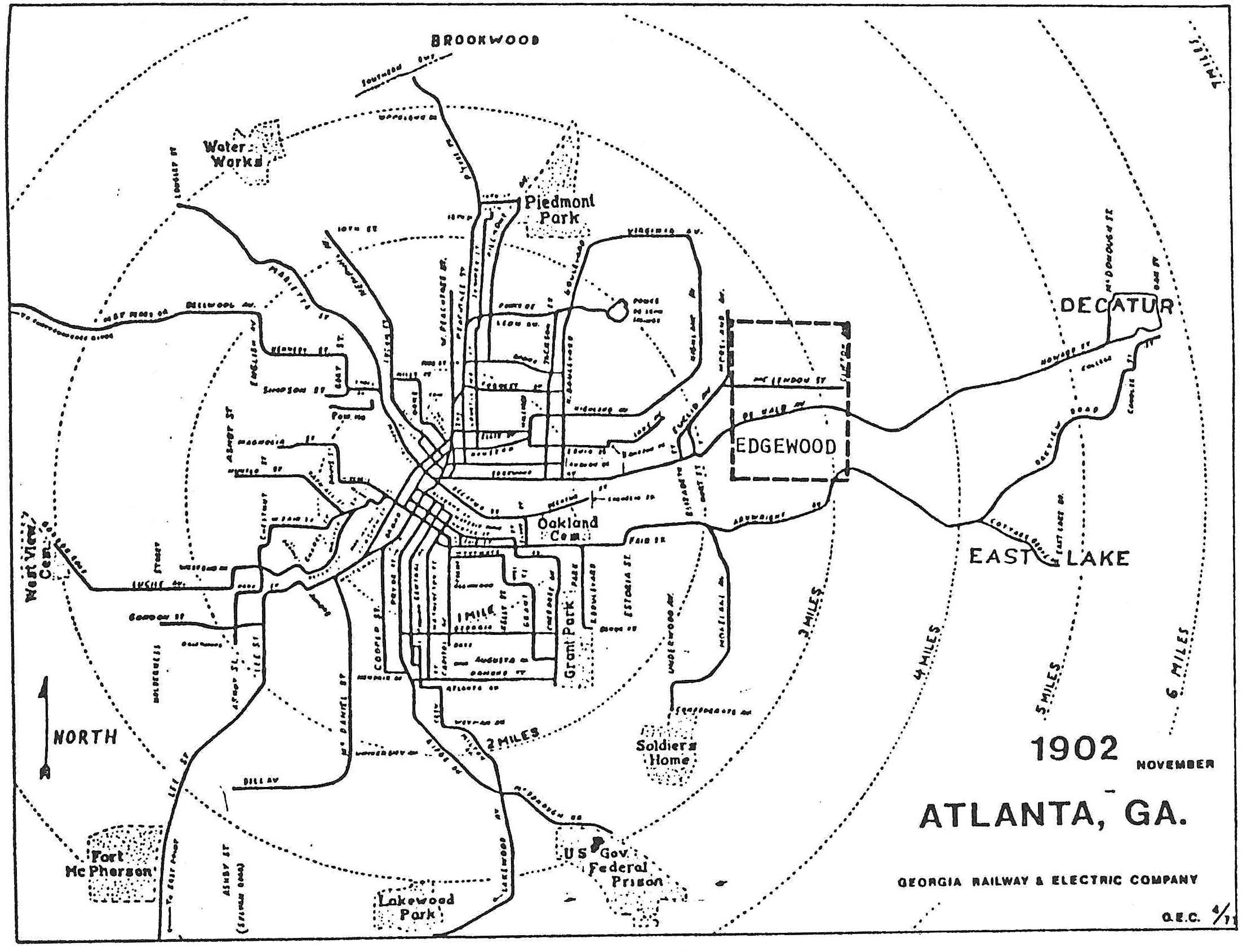
1902 map of Atlanta's streetcar network including Nine Mile Circle route

In the 1880s, Georgia Railroad executive Richard Peters and real estate developer George Washington Adair organized the Atlanta Street Railway Company. Their first project was the Nine Mile Trolley, which started serving the area sometime between 1888 and 1890. At first, patrons used this streetcar line to visit "the countryside" outside the city, and the line stimulated later development in the area. Adair built his home at 964 Rupley Drive (still standing and divided into upscale apartments). The iconic curves in the street at the intersections of Virginia Ave. with N. Highland and Monroe are remnants of the trolley line, which required gentle curves. The Trolley Square Apartments (now "Virginia Highlands [sic] Apartments") near Virginia and Monroe were built on the site of trolley maintenance facilities.

=== Residential development ===
The first land to be subdivided in what is now Virginia–Highland was Highland Park in the 1890s, located on either side of Ponce de Leon Ave. between today's Barnett St. and N. Highland Ave. The majority of the houses and streets in Virginia–Highland were constructed between 1909 and 1926. In 1916, the Arc Light Controversy raged between neighbors on Adair Ave. and N. Highland Ave.

=== Commercial development ===
Some businesses opened around the intersection of Virginia and N. Highland starting in 1908, with many more opening starting in 1925. At the same time development started in the Atkins Park commercial district around St. Charles. Ave. and N. Highland, including the present-day Atkins Park Restaurant (1922), which reportedly got what is now Atlanta's oldest liquor license when it became a bar and restaurant in 1927. Between 1928 and 1930, the Howard Dry Cleaning Company and the Phelps Millard Grocery opened, anchoring the Amsterdam and N. Highland business district. The Samuel N. Inman School, named after the nineteenth-century cotton merchant, was built in 1923. In 1924, fire station 19 was built on N. Highland at Los Angeles Ave.

Streetcar service to Virginia–Highland ended around 1947, along with all of the other trolley lines into and out of central Atlanta.

=== Decline ===
Virginia–Highland, like most intown Atlanta neighborhoods, suffered decline starting in the 1960s as residents moved to the suburbs. Less-affluent residents moved in, some single-family houses were turned into apartments, and crime increased. Some businesses closed and were replaced by lower-rent tenants such as pawn shops. Others, such as Moe’s and Joe’s (which opened in 1947) and Atkins Park Restaurant, stayed open. Many buildings deteriorated.

=== Failed proposal of I-485 and alternative development ===
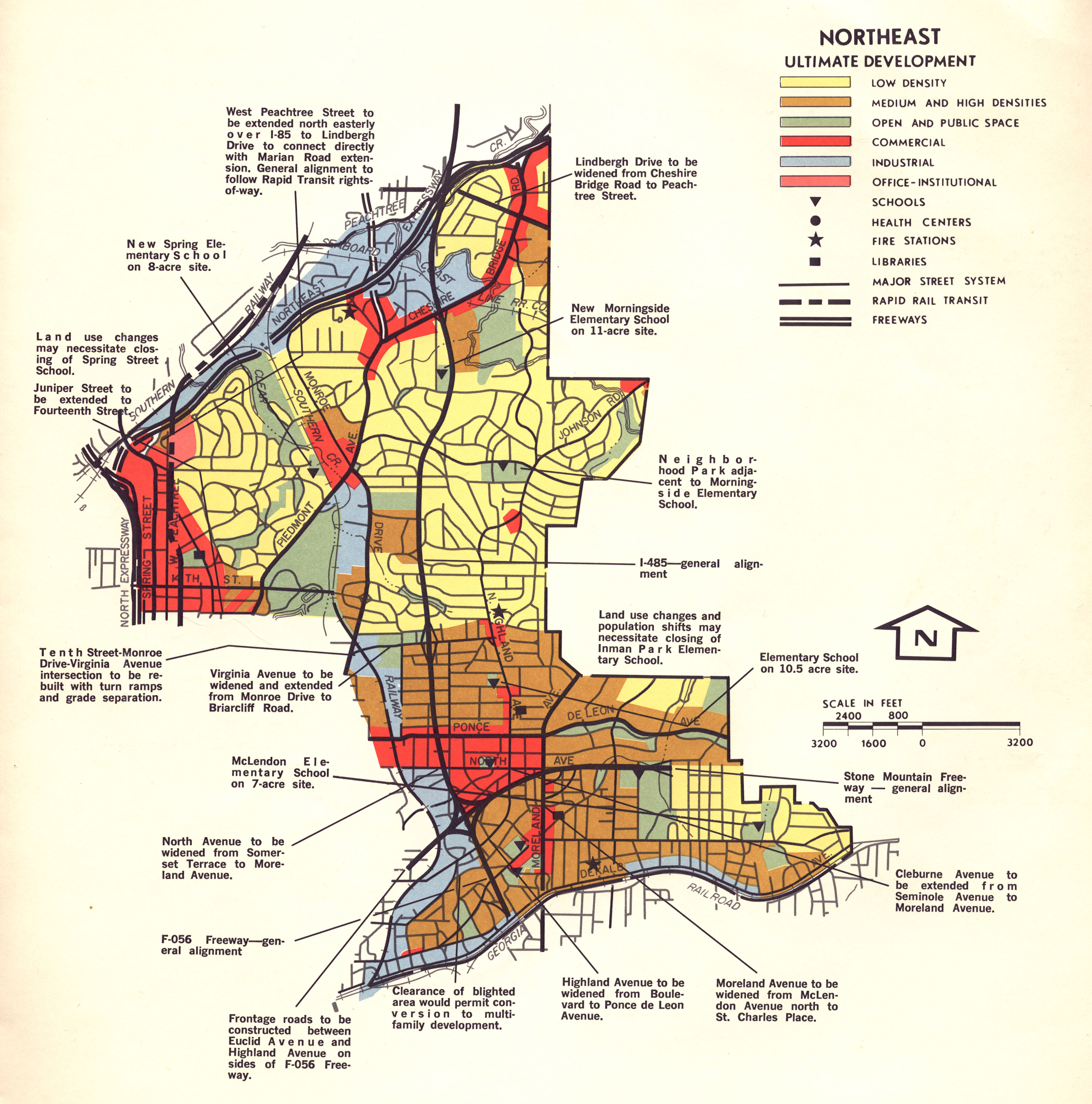
1970 map of proposed route of I-485 through northeast Atlanta

What could have been the death knell for the neighborhood sounded in the mid-1960s, when the Georgia Department of Transportation proposed building Interstate 485 to connect what is now Freedom Parkway through the neighborhood and to what is now Georgia 400 at Interstate 85. It would have included an interchange at Virginia Avenue where John Howell Memorial Park is today. Despite the I-485 proposal moving forward, a few middle-class families began moving back into the neighborhood, renovating homes.

In Fall 1971, Joseph (Joe) Drolet and others founded the Virginia–Highland Civic Association (VHCA), whose mission was to defeat I-485, and registered the association with the Georgia Secretary of State on August 22, 1972. They along with residents of Stone Mountain, Inman Park, and Morningside finally defeated I-485, and became a political force to be reckoned with. The current Neighborhood Planning Unit (NPU) system is an outgrowth of these events. In 2009, the original north/south freeway (connecting 675 to 400) was again put on GDOT's to-do list, but this time running in a tunnel underneath the neighborhoods, with buildings to vent exhaust fumes and smog above ground.

Between 1972 and 1975, property values increased from 20 to 50 percent. Home ownership levels rose 20 percent. A tour of renovated homes started in 1972. The Georgia Department of Transportation began selling properties it had acquired for I-485, virtually all of them for infill housing. The 3 acres (12,000 m^{2}) of land on Virginia Avenue where 11 houses had been taken and demolished to make way for a Virginia Avenue exit, however, was finally opened in 1988 as John Howell Memorial Park, in memory of Virginia–Highland resident and anti-freeway activist John Howell, who died from complications of HIV in 1988.

In the early 1980s, Atkins Park restaurant was renovated. Meanwhile, Stuart Meddin bought and renovated the 1925 commercial block at North Highland and Virginia.

In 1988, the turn-of-the-century trolley barns on 5 acres (2.0 ha) on Virginia Avenue on the east side of the BeltLine Eastside Trail (today's Virginia–Highland Apartments) were torn down despite the City Council and VHCA's attempts to save them. Although previously assuring local residents that he favored saving the historic structures, Mayor Andrew Young then vetoed the resolution, and the Council's vote of 11-3 was not enough to override it. Young cited the discovery of asbestos in the buildings and other hazardous materials on the property.

=== Metro-wide destination ===
As the neighborhood continued to regentrify, property values increased rapidly; the shops and restaurants became progressively more upscale. Towards the end of the 1990s, the neighborhood-oriented character of the business districts gave way to businesses serving patrons from across greater Atlanta. Virginia–Highland wrestled with traffic and parking issues. Apartments affordable to students became more difficult to find.

In 2000, a spat among organizers and a shakeup in the organizing committee made local headlines. However, Summerfest did continue as usual in 2001 as one of Atlanta's highest profile neighborhood festivals.

=== Preservation and balance ===
In November 2006, the Georgia Trust for Historic Preservation added Virginia–Highland to its list of "places in peril" due to an acceleration of teardowns and infill projects by real estate developers and newcomers to the area. However, Virginia–Highland remains one of the most architecturally historic, distinct and vibrant neighborhoods in Atlanta.

Residents, through the VHCA, succeeded in getting the city council to pass zoning legislation prescribing development that fits the scale of the streets, rolling back loose zoning ordinances passed in the 1960s. The new zoning also prescribes a maximum number of each type of establishment – restaurants, bars, retail and other types.

The zoning aims to preserve a vibrant mix of enterprises while keeping control noise, parking and traffic issues but also addresses specific problems which came up in 2005-2008:

- Avoiding Virginia–Highland suffering the same fate as Buckhead Village, where a large number of bars opened, eventually attracting crime from other areas of the city.
- Fighting a liquor permit for the 700-seat Hilan Theatre).
- Opposing "The Mix@841" project at 841 N. Highland Ave., originally proposed to be 80 feet tall.

In December 2008 the VHCA bought the land for New Highland Park, a small 0.41 acres (0.17 ha) park at N. Highland and St. Charles.

In Autumn 2010, a rash of seven muggings occurred. These statistics were far lower than those of the 1980s, when the neighborhood was rougher, but the news shook up the neighborhood in 2010. Partly in response, the local security patrol, FBAC, expanded patrol coverage to the entire neighborhood. Shortly thereafter, in November 2010, Charles Boyer was murdered during a mugging, for which the "Jack Boys" were indicted in Jan. 2011. Police continued to step up patrols and since then Virginia–Highland has returned to its status as one of Atlanta's lower-crime neighborhoods.

Currently the neighborhood is enjoying adjacent development projects including a new biking and walking trail along the BeltLine Eastside Trail from Piedmont Park to Inman Park, as well as the redeveloped Ponce City Market, the old Sears building, now a major multi-use development. Behind Ponce City Market is Historic Fourth Ward Park, opened in 2011.

In July 2014, the Atlanta City Council accepted the Virginia–Highland Civic Association's master plan, as a result of which the plan becomes part of the City of Atlanta’s Comprehensive Development Plan.

== Location ==
Virginia–Highland is bounded on the north by Amsterdam Avenue and the neighborhood of Morningside, on the east by the Atlanta city limit/Briarcliff Road and the Druid Hills neighborhood, on the south by Ponce de Leon Avenue and the Poncey–Highland neighborhood, and on the west by the BeltLine Eastside Trail which is the border with Piedmont Park and Midtown.

=== Atkins Park ===
Within these boundaries is Atkins Park, a neighborhood listed on the National Register of Historic Places. The City of Atlanta recognizes Atkins Park as a separate neighborhood, however, Atkins Park is a part of the Virginia–Highland Civic Association.

=== St. Charles-Greenwood ===
St. Charles-Greenwood had its own neighborhood association in the 1980s, but was then absorbed into Virginia–Highland.

== Commercial districts ==
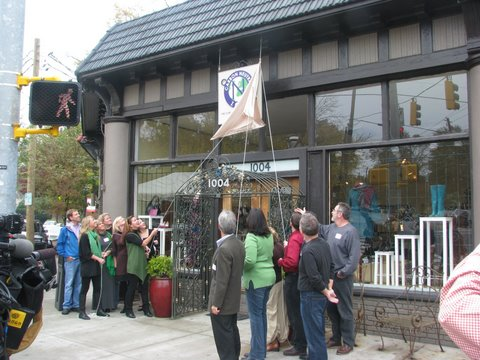
Virginia and N. Highland commercial node

Virginia–Highland is one of many intown Atlanta neighborhoods characterized by commercial space of two sorts:

- groups of small commercial units clustered at corner where the streetcars used to stop (e.g. N. Highland Ave. at St. Charles and Virginia)
- commercial space in former warehouses and industrial buildings, especially, but not exclusively, along the BeltLine Eastside Trail (e.g. Amsterdam Walk and Ponce de Leon Place)

Such "streetcar corner" nodes are located at Virginia at North Highland — the neighborhood's namesake and main shopping and dining area, well known since the 1990s for its restaurants, St. Charles at North Highland, Amsterdam at North Highland, and Virginia at Rosedale Drive. Amsterdam Walk, a shopping and entertainment complex built in what was originally part of the Campbell Coal Company warehouse. Ponce de Leon Place also has a concentration of warehouse space converted to commercial use.

Just across the BeltLine Eastside Trail from the western border of Virginia–Highland are two major strip malls, Midtown Place and Midtown Promenade. Adjacent is the former Sears building, now Ponce City Market, with office, retail and residential space, and a gourmet food hall.

== Architecture ==
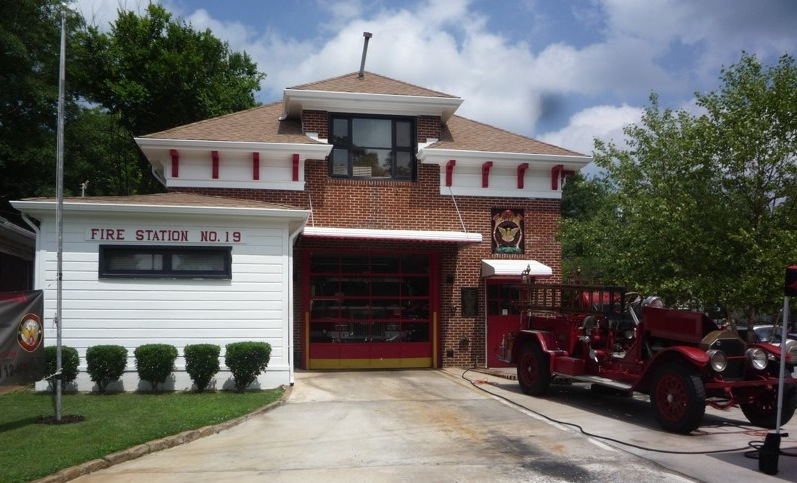
Fire Station #19

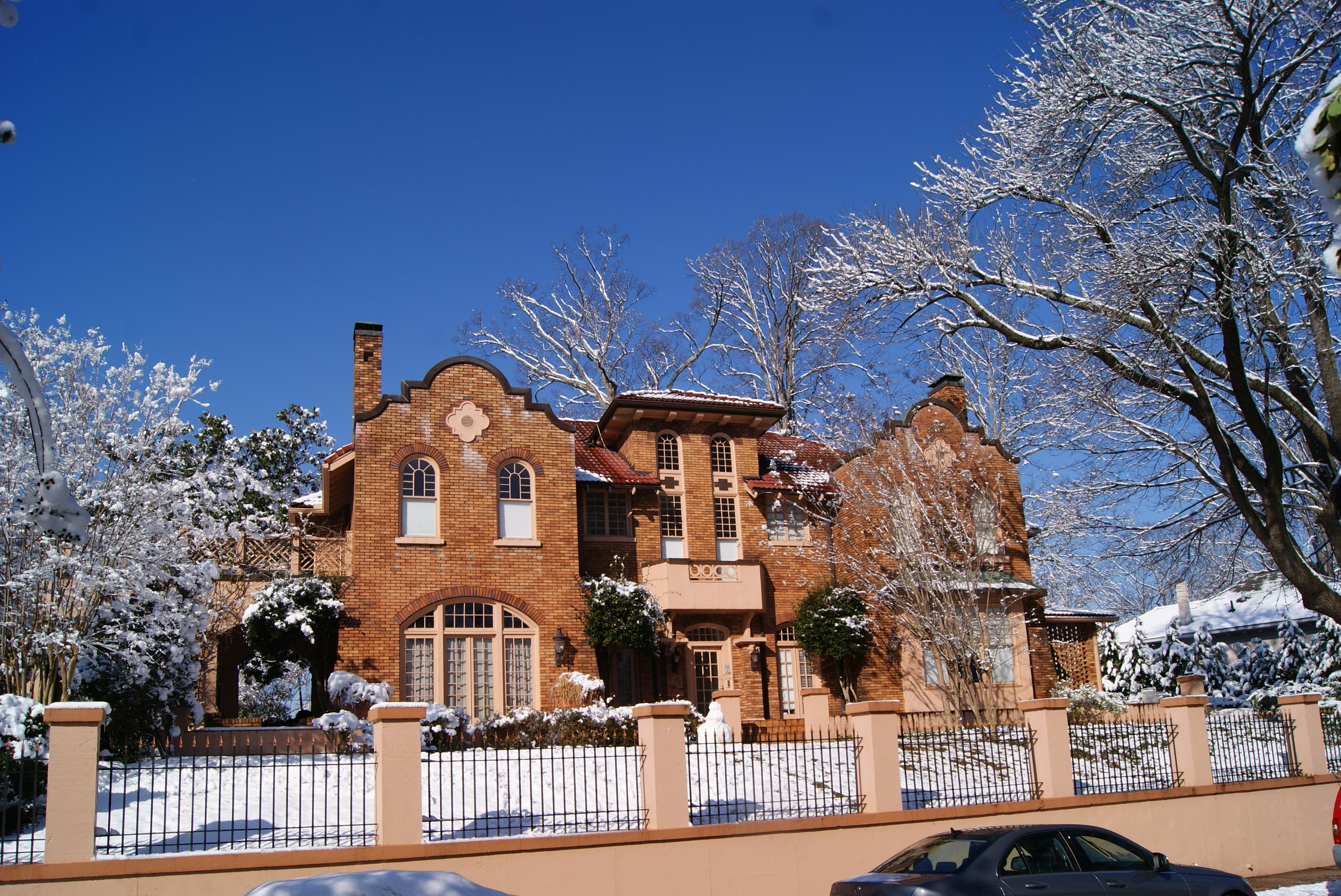
Adair Mansion

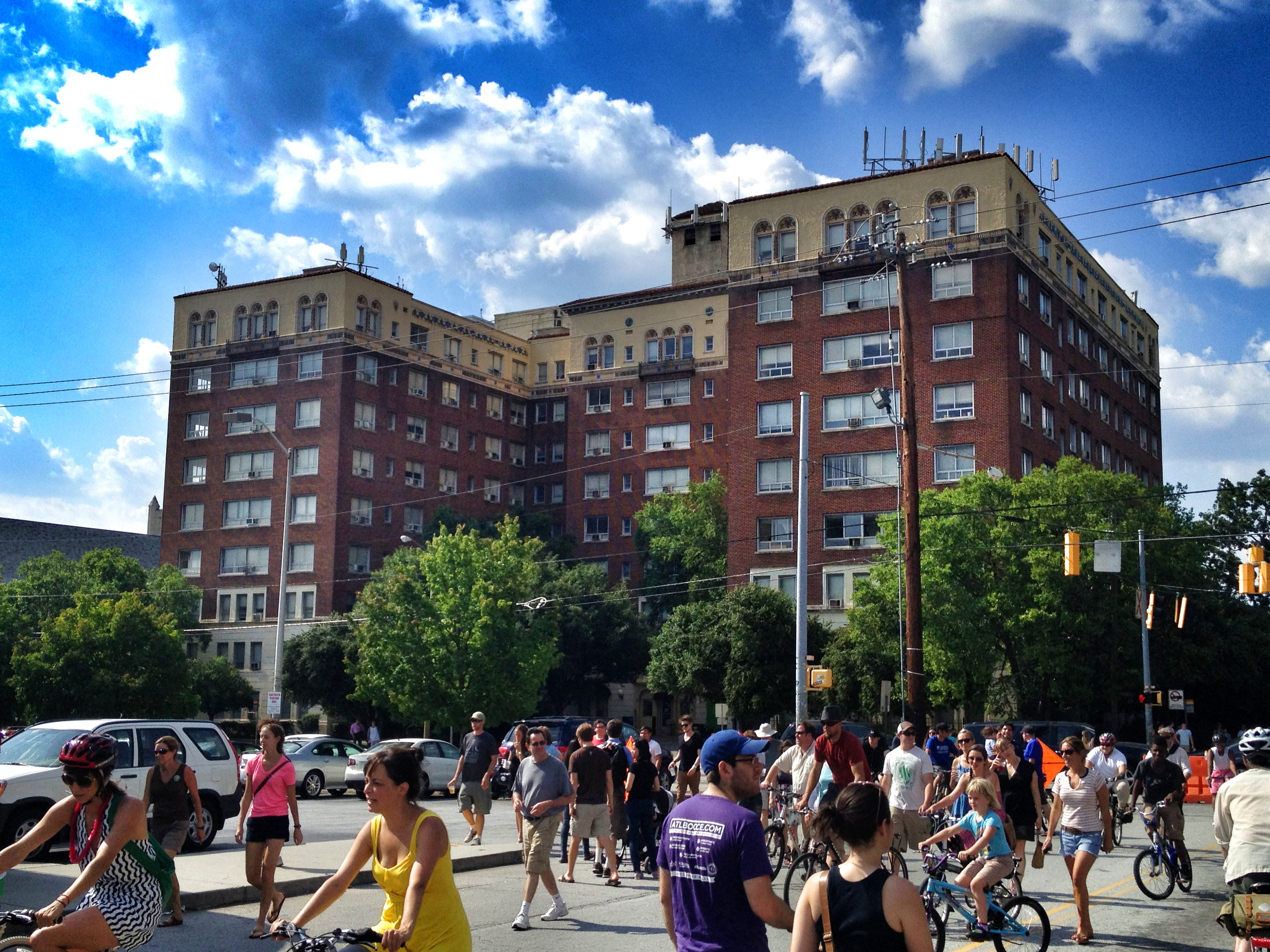
Briarcliff Hotel, now Briarcliff Summit apartments

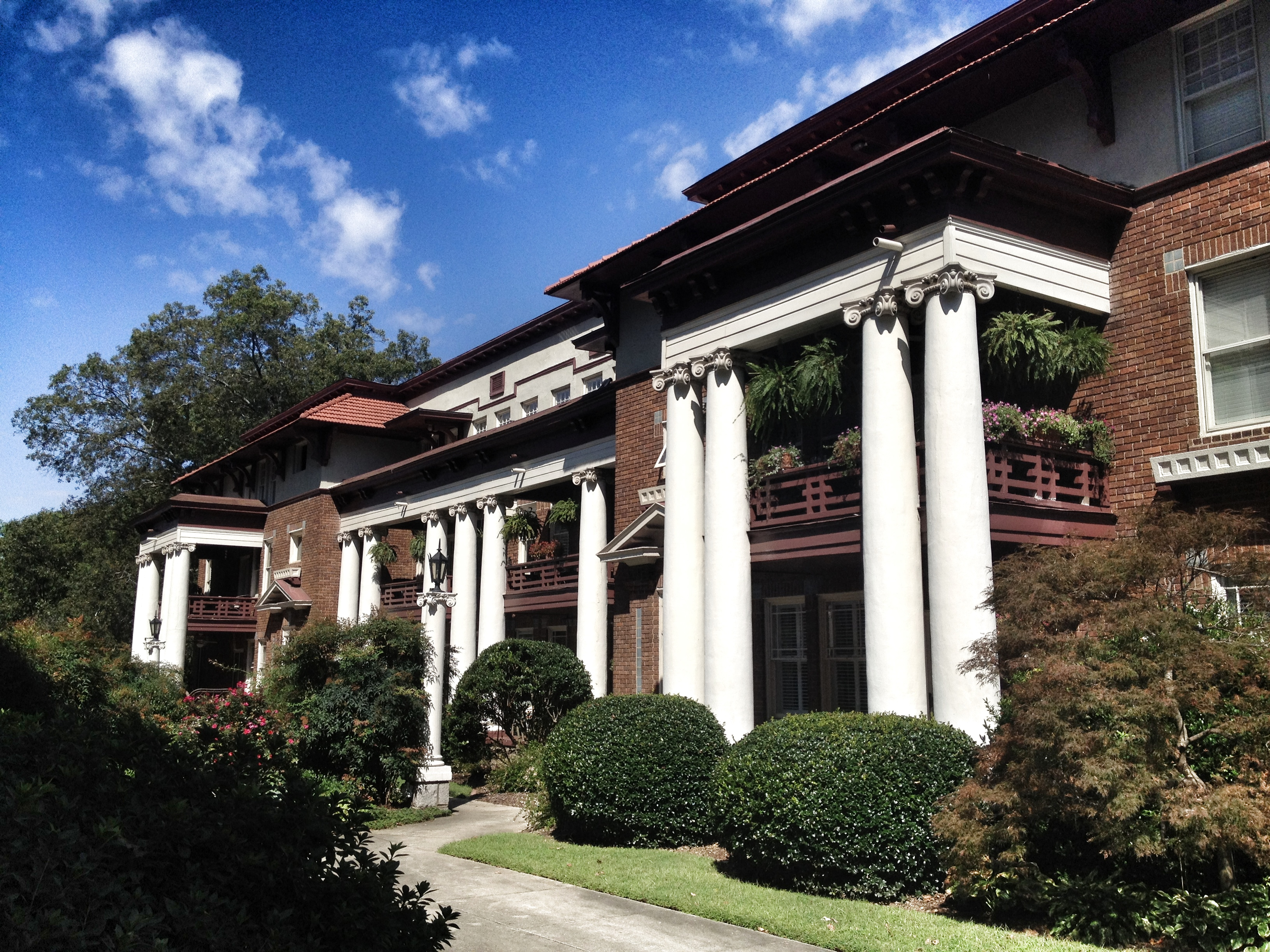
The Colonnades apartment complex

Virginia–Highland is best known for its oldest residences – the Craftsman bungalows that line the streets closest to which or on which the Nine Mile trolley ran: Virginia Avenue, North Highland Avenue, St. Charles Avenue, etc. Other architectural styles include English Vernacular Revival and Colonial Revival, and other house types include English Cottage and American Foursquare.

Besides the churches noted below, some other landmarks of note are:

- Fire station 19 (1924), built in 1924 in the bungalow style. Atlanta's oldest operating fire station at 1063 N. Highland Ave.
- The Adair mansion at 964 Rupley Drive, now divided into condominiums.
- Briarcliff Hotel (1925) (photo), 1050 Ponce De Leon Ave. at N. Highland.
- The Colonnades residential building
- the Hilan Theatre (1932)
- Atkins Park Tavern (1922)
- Belly, a delicatessen, formerly the Atkins Park Pharmacy (1914), later Fleeman's Pharmacy

Virginia–Highland and Atkins Park are both listed on the National Register of Historic Places (NRHP), with Atkins Park having in addition the status of historic overlay district which, unlike a NRHP listing by itself, actually provides for measures to enforce preservation. The VHCA is investigating the possibilities of designating Virginia–Highland a historic overlay district as well.

== Law and government ==
=== Government ===
Virginia–Highland is a neighborhood of Atlanta, which unlike in many other cities, are officially defined and organized and given specific areas of control. The Virginia–Highland Civic Association consists of a volunteer board and oversees matters controlled at the neighborhood level such as community festivals, community safety, beautification, and efforts to improve parks, sidewalks, etc. As noted above, the Atkins Park neighborhood, while having its own neighborhoods association, participates in the VaHi association much as if it were part of VaHi. Planning, building permits, etc. are controlled by the Neighborhood planning unit F, which also includes Morningside-Lenox Park, Piedmont Heights and Lindridge-Martin Manor.

=== Crime prevention ===
Virginia–Highland serves as a model for other neighborhoods of Atlanta in implementing a comprehensive range of safety measures:

- Virginia–Highland is part of APD patrol zone 6.
- FBAC is the neighborhood security patrol, funded by members, run by volunteers and staffed by off-duty APD officers.
- The VaHi Civic Association organizes a neighborhood watch program via its Safety Team.
- VHAlerts is a system which leverages the text-message features of Twitter to allow members to text-message all other members in case of a dangerous situation in the neighborhood.

== Culture and recreation ==
=== Parks ===
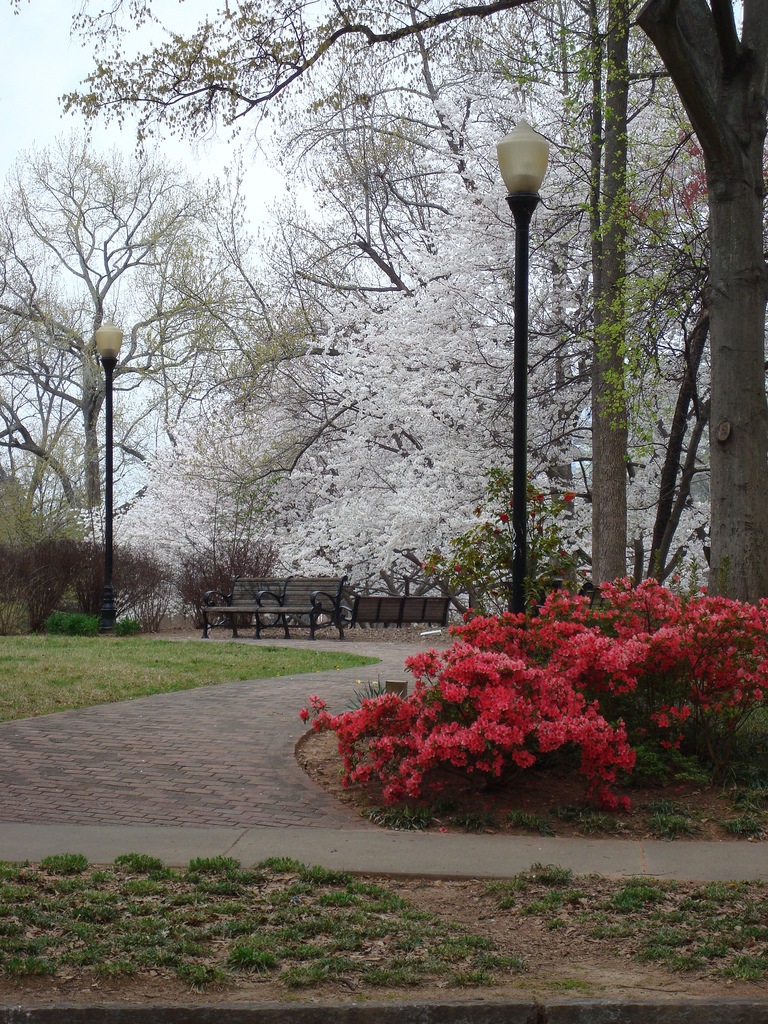
John Howell Memorial Park

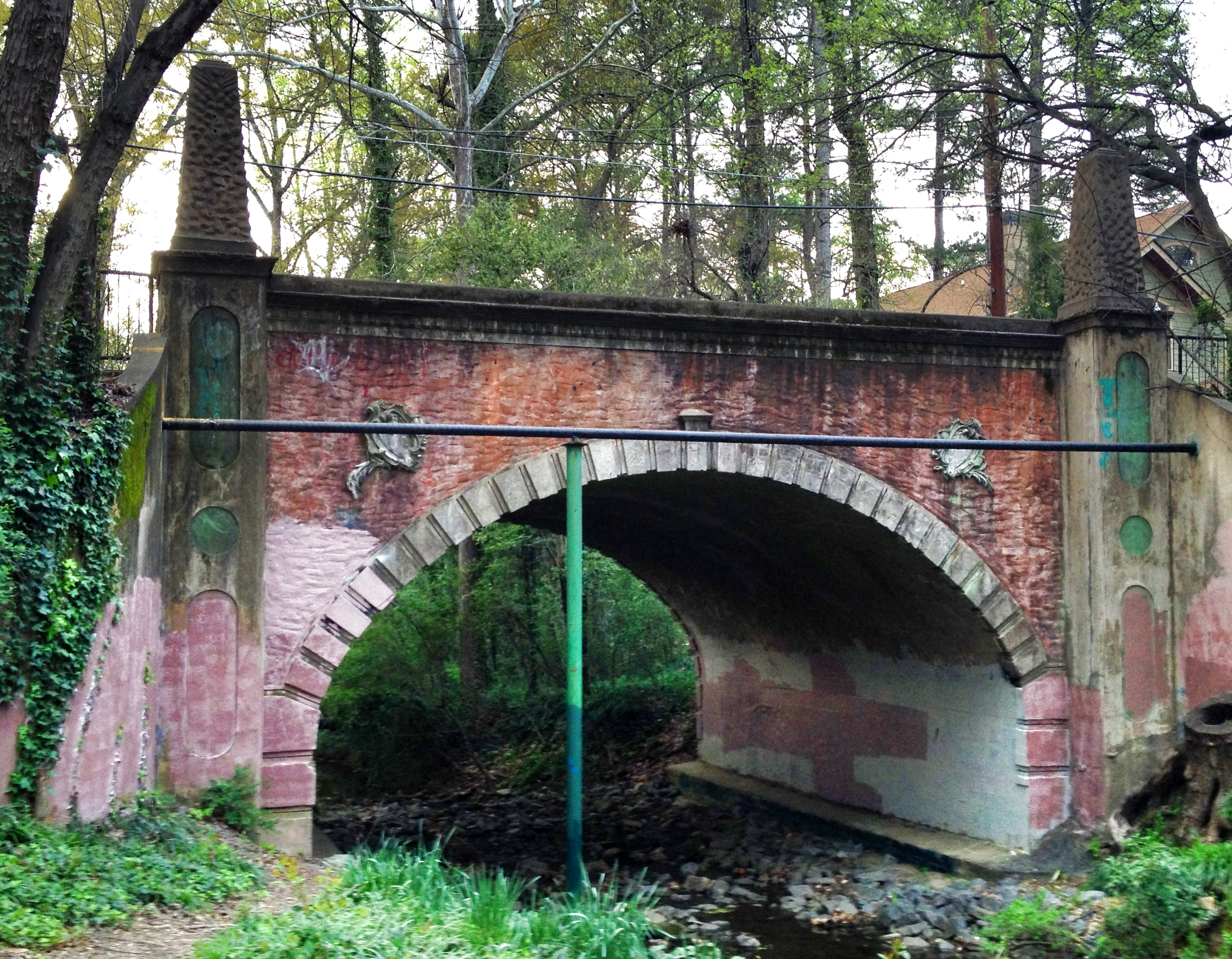
Bridge in Orme Park

Virginia–Highland borders:

- Atlanta's landmark Piedmont Park (vastly expanded in 2011)
- the Eastside Trail, part of the BeltLine, a former railroad line, now a 22-mile trail around the central neighborhoods of Atlanta. The BeltLine features dozens of outdoor artworks along its length through the Art on the BeltLine project.

Within the boundaries of Virginia–Highland are:

- John Howell Memorial Park, along Virginia Ave. between Barnett and Arcadia Streets
- Orme Park, bounded by Brookridge Dr. and Elkmont Dr., through which Clear Creek runs
- North Highland Park, which the civic association bought in 2008 and were developed in 2012 as an eco-friendly park and rain garden

In 2014, residents cleaned up and beautified the unpaved alley between St. Charles Avenue and Ponce, and it is now known as Maiden Trail.

=== "Neighborhood Arboretum" ===
Virginia–Highland has one of seven Atlanta "neighborhood arboreta", which are in fact walking routes of trees (identified by markers) in yards, sidewalk planting strips, and parks. A brochure maps out the route and the trees along each route, as well as educating visitors about the trees.

=== Festivals ===
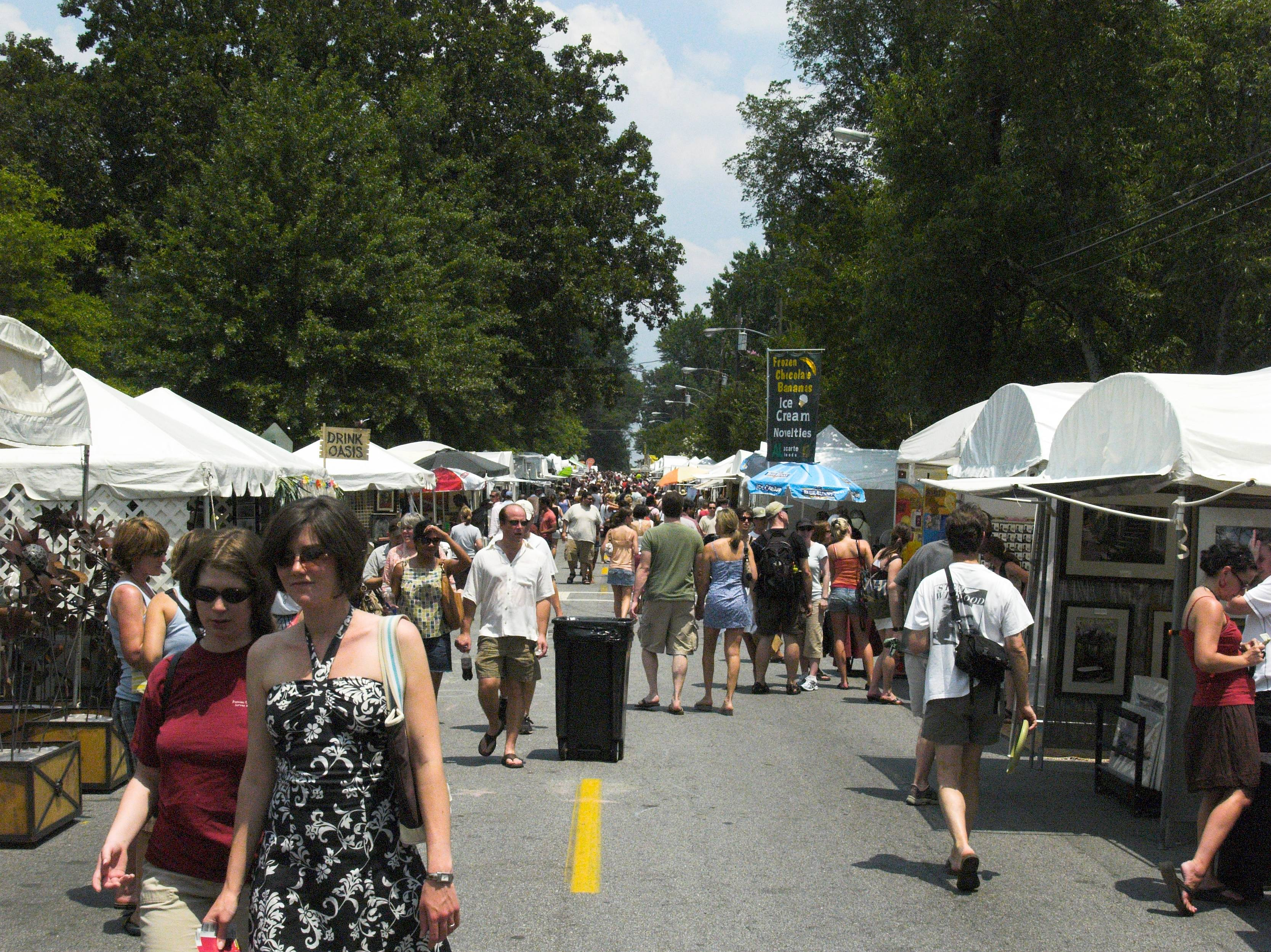
Virginia–Highland Summerfest

On the first weekend in June, the Virginia–Highland Civic Association (VHCA) hosts the yearly Virginia–Highland Summerfest arts and music festival, which also includes a popular road race, and is one of the largest art festivals in the Southeastern United States and one of Atlanta's most popular neighborhood festivals. VHCA also organizes the annual Virginia–Highland Tour of Homes in December. In May, A Taste of the Highlands in John Howell Park features samplings from favorite neighborhood restaurants and live music. Every March or April, the North Highland Mile (formerly Morningside Mile) race and block party takes place.

=== Film and television ===
Portions of the films Life as We Know It (the bakery portrayed was the real-life Belly General Store) and Trouble with the Curve (George's restaurant) were filmed in Virginia–Highland. Portions of the pilot for the "B.E.T." network's Being Mary Jane were filmed at 780 N. Highland Ave. in April 2012.

=== Religion ===
Virginia–Highland is home to a number of churches:

- Church of Our Saviour (Anglo-Catholic Episcopalian) – current building mid-1930s
- Druid Hills Presbyterian Church – built 1923, expanded 1940, 1963
- First Associate Reformed Presbyterian Church – built 1924
- Virginia–Highland Church UCC – built 1923

The Chabad Intown synagogue is located on Ponce de Leon Place.

==== Eruv ====
The Virginia–Highland eruv covers nearly all of Virginia–Highland as well as part of the Morningside-Lenox Park neighborhood up to E. Rock Springs Road/E. Morningside Drive. The eruv is "marked off" by defining utility poles as "sides of the doorways" and the wires as the "lintels" (tops of doorways). Within its boundaries observant Jews are allowed to do certain things on the Sabbath that they would not normally be allowed to do outside the home, such as carry keys or food.

== Education ==
The community is zoned to Atlanta Public Schools.

Zoned schools include:

- Springdale Park Elementary
- David T. Howard Middle School
- Midtown High School

== Transportation ==
Virginia–Highland is served by the following MARTA bus routes which also connect it to MARTA rail lines:

- 2 along Ponce de Leon to North Avenue rail station or to both Inman Park and Candler Park/Edgewood rail stations
- 6 along Briarcliff to Emory or to Inman Park rail station
- 16 along N. Highland (southbound turns onto Ralph McGill ending at Five Points rail station)
- 36 from Midtown rail station, Virginia Avenue, north on N. Highland, east on Decatur to Emory, Decatur and Avondale rail station
- 99 west from Monroe and Virginia along 10th Street to Midtown rail station; south from Monroe and Virginia along Boulevard

The neighborhood was long served by streetcar line #15 which later became bus line #45. Bus line 45 was discontinued in 2010.

== Noted residents ==
Noted residents of Virginia–Highland, past and present, include:

- Margaret Edson, 1999 Pulitzer Prize winner for the play Wit, as of February 2012 a social-studies teacher at Inman Middle School
- Don Lemon, CNN journalist, author
- Isabel Wilkerson, author of The Warmth of Other Suns, the story of African American migration from the South to the North
- Dr. Leila Denmark lived on Kentucky Avenue and then Hudson Drive in the 1930s and 1940s. Dr. Denmark was the world's oldest practicing pediatrician until her retirement in May 2001 at the age of 103. At her death in 2012 she was the 4th-oldest verified living person in the world.
- Green B. Adair (c. 1837-1914), fertilizer magnate, had his summer house at what is now the Adair Mansion from 1895-1911.
- Richard Copeland Todd (1792–1852), Atlanta pioneer. In 1822 Todd and his wife Martha settled a homestead located at what is now 816 Greenwood Avenue.
