= Intown Atlanta =

Loosely-defined region of Atlanta, Georgia, US

Approximate extent of intown Atlanta (high-certainty core). The boundary is approximate. Base map © OpenStreetMap contributors.

Intown Atlanta (or as an adjective, "intown") is a loosely defined term used in metro Atlanta to designate an area containing parts of the City of Atlanta and bordering communities. The definition of "intown" varies.

== Strictest definition ==
The strictest definition of "intown" includes only Downtown, Midtown, and the surrounding mostly pre-World War II neighborhoods that contain unique destinations that draw customers from across metro Atlanta.

- Examples of such neighborhoods include:
  - Grant Park with Zoo Atlanta
  - Virginia-Highland and Edgewood with their concentrations of shops and restaurants
  - West Midtown, Cabbagetown and Reynoldstown with their industrial architectural heritage
- City of Decatur is included in this definition.
- West End was referred to as an intown neighborhood as early as

1982.

Buckhead is excluded from this definition of "intown"; note that Buckhead was not at pre-WWII neighborhood and was annexed in 1952.

Sources using this definition include Intown Elite Real Estate, Intown Drew and Keen Team.

== Occasionally included ==
Some sources extend "intown" to immediately adjacent areas. Avondale Estates, just east of Decatur, appears in Intown Elite's intown neighborhood guide and is described by Atlanta Magazine as "intown living—with space". It is not, however, universally counted as intown.

== Loose usage ==
"Intown" is sometimes used informally as a synonym for "ITP" ("inside the Perimeter"), i.e. anything inside I-285. Intown Elite acknowledges the term "could be loosely defined as anything inside of the perimeter" but describes its own focus as "more refined to the neighborhoods closer to the city center".

== Streetcar-era development ==
Intown Atlanta boundary over 1940s streetcar network

Many of the Intown Atlanta neighborhoods developed as streetcar suburbs in the late 19th and early 20th centuries. This is apparent when looking at the boundary overlaid against the streetcar map. From New Georgia Encyclopedia, streetcars "allowed for the suburban expansion of Atlanta in the early years of the twentieth century".

Inman Park, developed by Joel Hurt from 1889 and connected to downtown by a trolley line he built, was the city's first planned suburb. Streetcar lines also served Decatur, West End (from 1871), and Ormewood Park (1880s), and Virginia-Highland via the Nine-Mile Circle (1889).

The streetcar system was replaced by trolleybuses and buses in the 1940s. The last streetcar ran on April 10, 1949, and Georgia Power sold its Atlanta transit operations the following year.
