= John Howell Memorial Park =

Memorial park in Atlanta, Georgia, United States

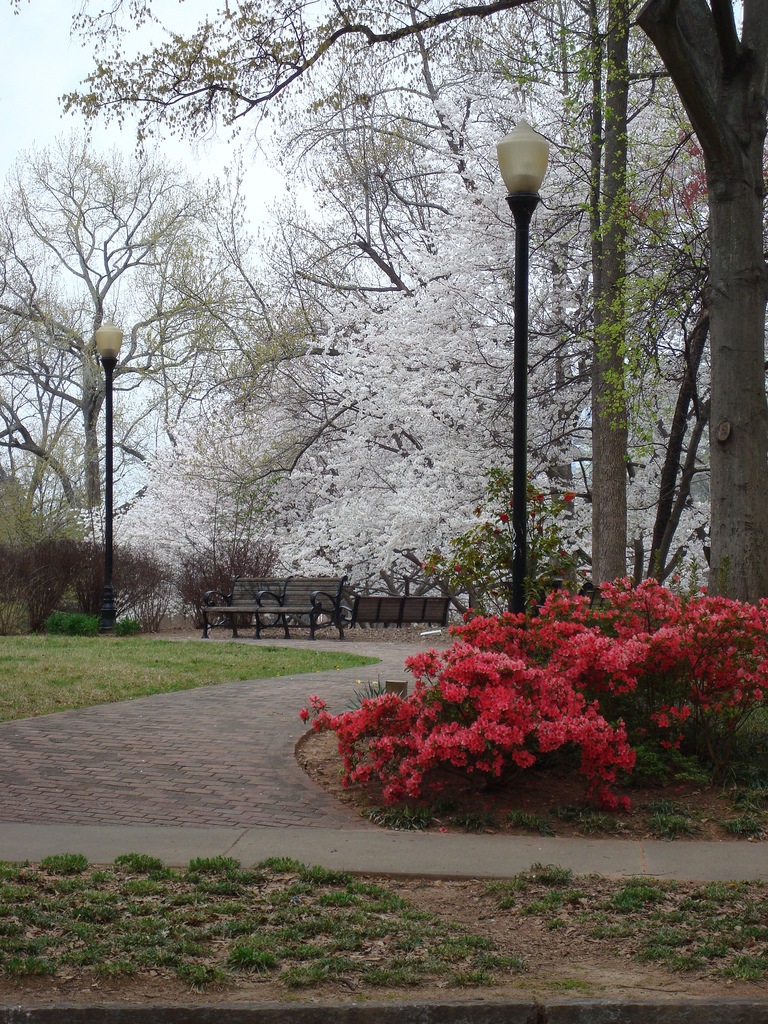
- John Howell Park

- Location within Atlanta
- Type: Urban park
- Location: Virginia Avenue, Virginia–Highland, Atlanta, Georgia
- Coordinates: 33.7817°N 84.36°W
- Designer: Peter Frawley
- Etymology: John Howell
- Facilities: Playgrounds, two sand volleyball courts

John Howell Memorial Park, usually just called John Howell Park, is a park on Virginia Avenue in the Virginia–Highland neighborhood of Atlanta. It is on land where 11 houses were torn down for the I-485 freeway, which was never built. The park is named after John Howell, the first president of the Virginia-Highland Civic Association (VHCA).

== History ==
=== The freeway ===
In the 1960s the Georgia State Highway Department (now the Georgia Department of Transportation) planned a multi-lane divided highway from the Atlanta Medical Center on Boulevard to I-85 near Cheshire Bridge. The state bought up houses along the route and tore many of them down right away, while the fight over the road was still going on. Eleven of them were on Virginia Avenue.

The VHCA was formed in 1972 to fight the road; Howell was one of its founders. Together with other neighborhoods they defeated I-485; see Atlanta freeway revolts.

=== The park ===
Long after the freeway was dead there were still vacant lots and old house foundations along Virginia Avenue. After years of discussion the neighborhood agreed on a park, to be named after Howell, a gay rights activist who had died of HIV complications in 1988. It was dedicated to his memory in 1989. Lola Carlisle and Karri Hobson-Pape, in their 2011 book on Virginia-Highland, call it one of the first parks in the country with an HIV component.

The John Howell Park Project, led by Rick Porter and his longtime partner Jerry Bright, chose landscape architect Peter Frawley and ran the design and construction of the park. The VHCA dates it as the neighborhood's main park from 1991.

=== Renovation ===
In 2022 the VHCA started a push to renovate the park, as its infrastructure was aging and it was getting much more use; the project was later handed over to a new nonprofit, Friends of John Howell Park. The plans call for a rainwater area in place of the lower playground, a bigger playground around the Cunard Playground, and picnic tables; the volleyball courts stay as they are. Friends of John Howell Park is run by volunteers.

The work is split into two phases:

- Phase 1, "The Adventure Zone", on the west side of the park, will improve safety, accessibility and the addition of new playground equipment.
- Phase 2, "The Great Lawn & Oval", on the east side of the park, turns the oval near Barnett into a space for parties, yoga and other events, and restores the great lawn.

== Cunard Memorial Playground ==
On July 10, 2003, a tree fell on the Cunard family's car during a storm, killing Lisa Cunard and her sons Max (3) and Owen (5 months). Her husband Brad was driving and survived. Neighbors raised more than $150,000 for a playground in their memory (later given as over $160,000, with more than 400 volunteers, in five months). Cynthia Gentry headed the playground committee; installation day was November 15, 2003.

The playground is on the west side of the park. It was dedicated on March 28, 2004, with Mayor Shirley Franklin there. Its fire truck play structure is a tribute to the firefighters of the neighborhood's Station 19, the oldest active fire station in Atlanta.

== Features ==
The park is on two levels, and the VHCA calls it the largest and most visited park in the neighborhood. The lower half has the playgrounds, two volleyball courts, two small lawns and winding paths. There is an open lawn at the east end.

The two sand volleyball courts were built by Volleyball Atlanta, which has also maintained them since. The City of Atlanta and the Atlanta Volleyball League have worked together on the courts since the early 1990s. There are no restrooms; parking is on the street along Virginia Avenue.

== Gallery ==
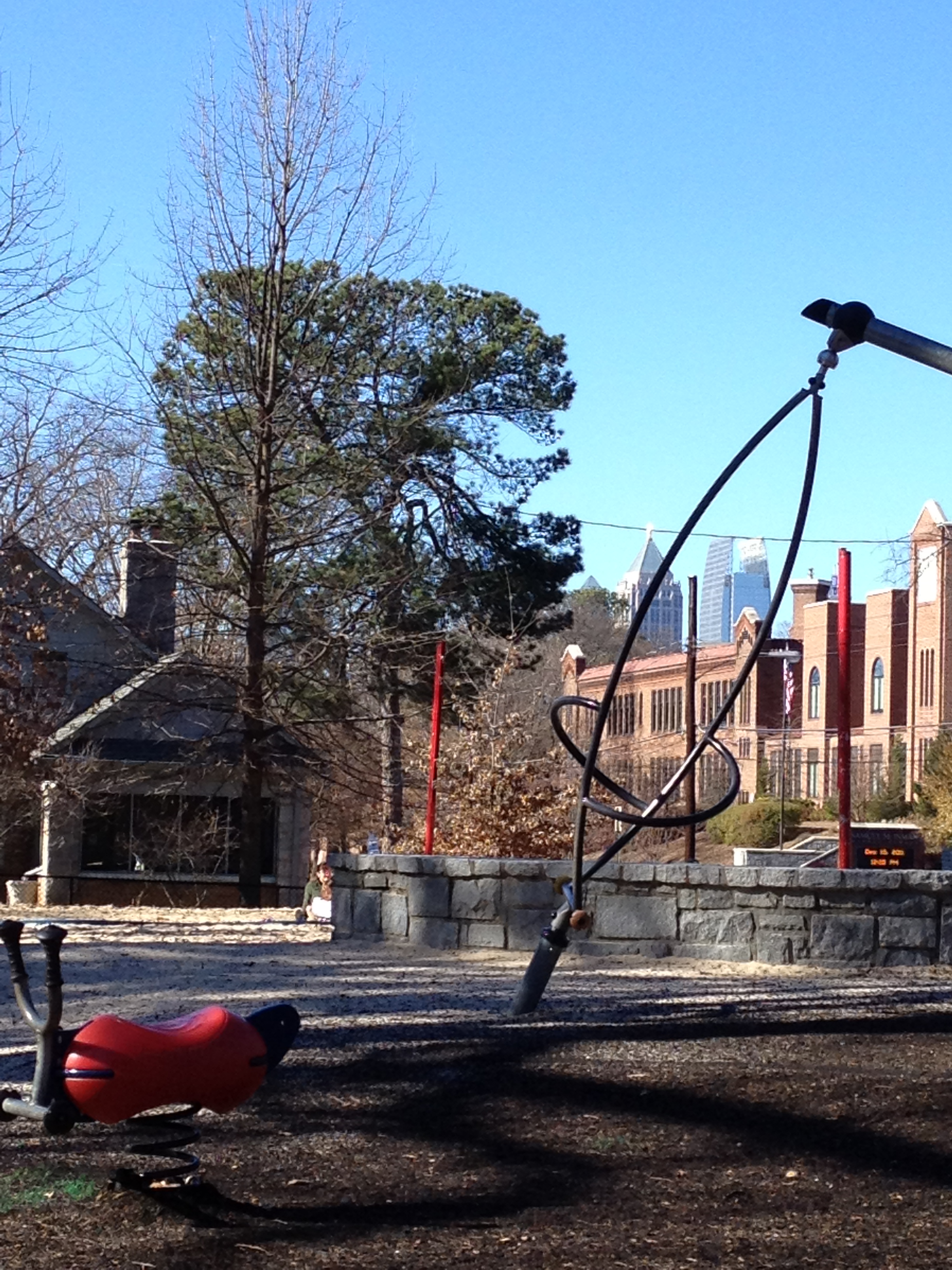
View toward the Midtown skyline

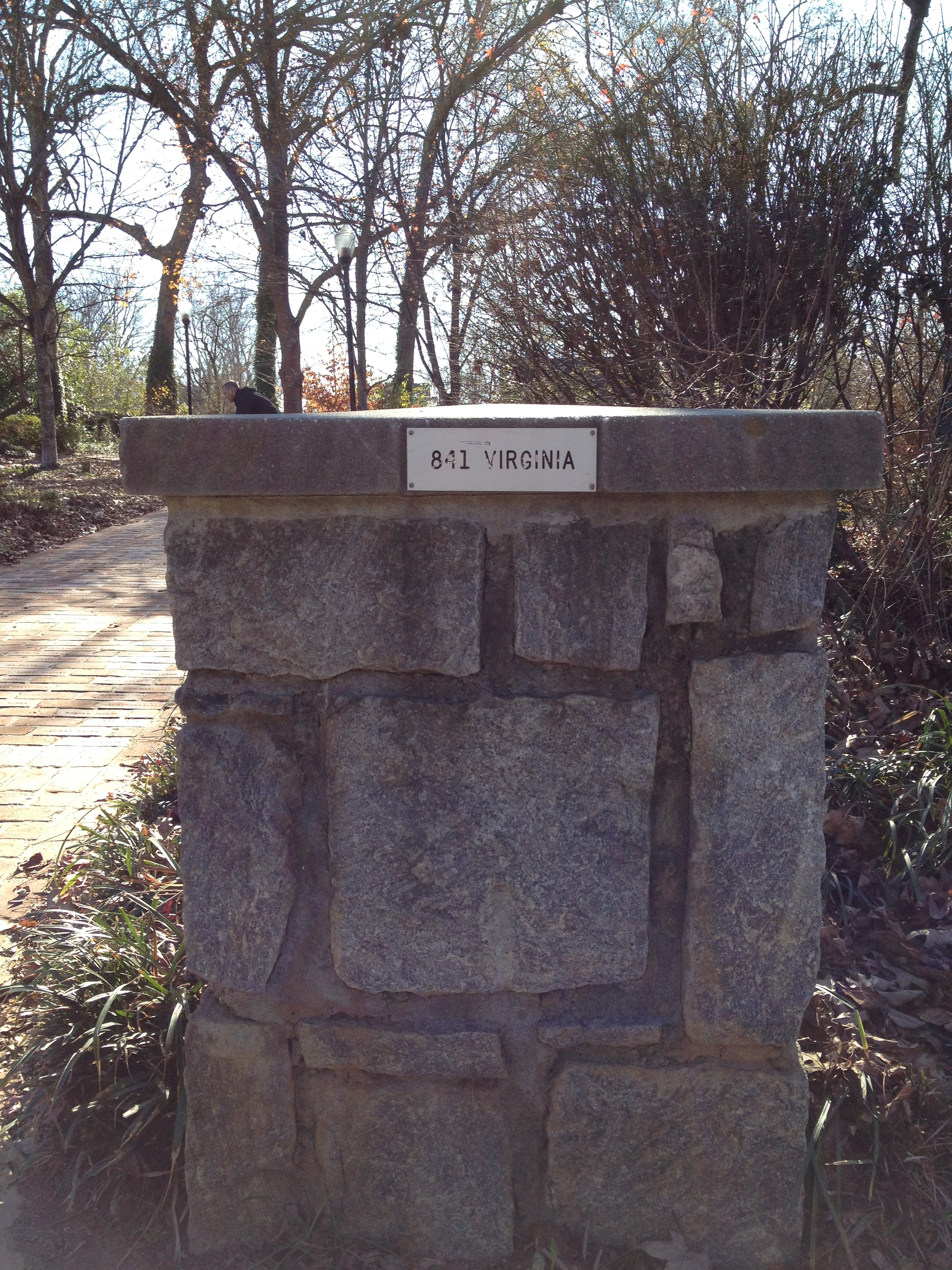
Column marking one of the houses torn down for the freeway

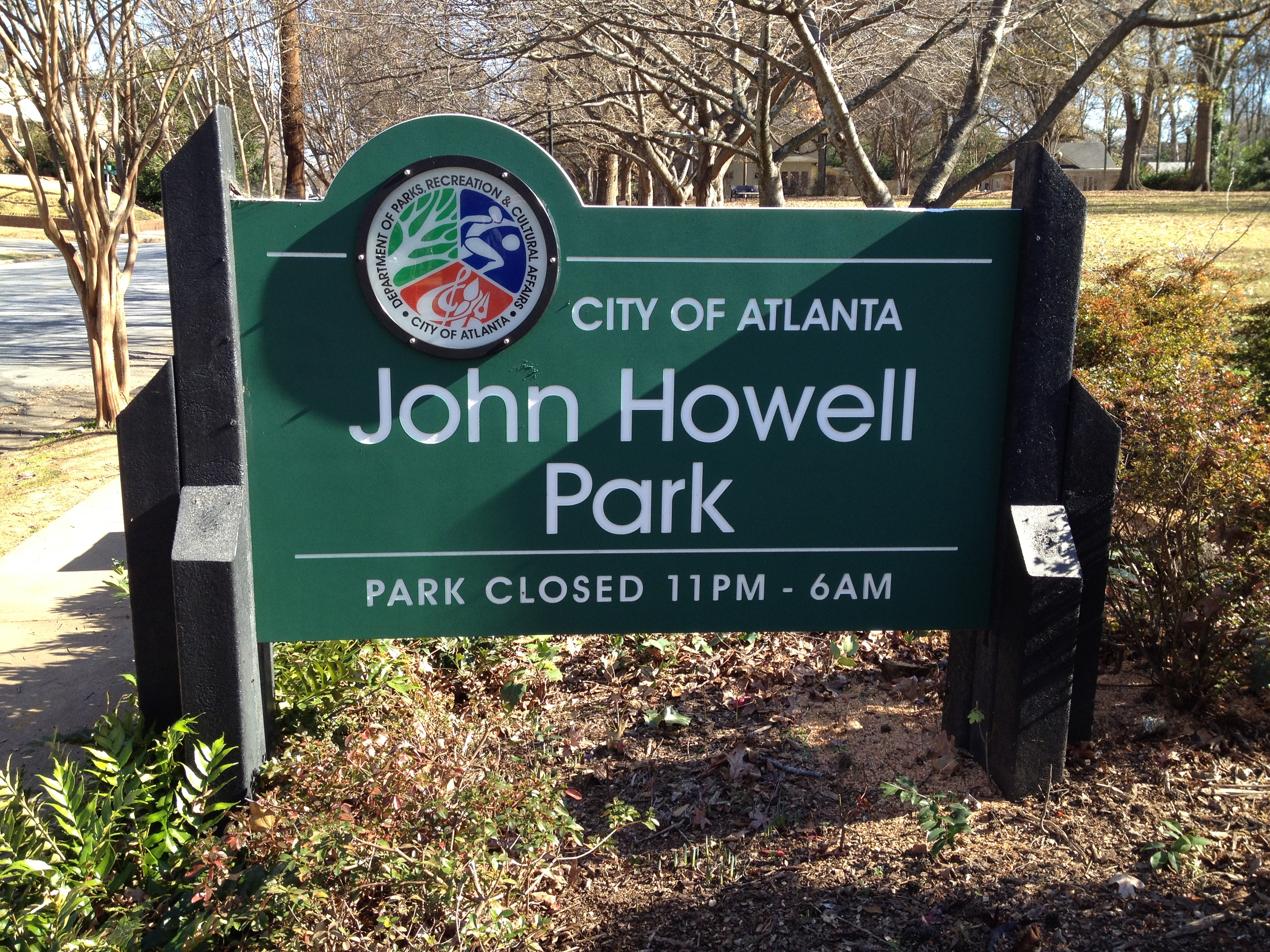
Park sign (2011)

Park sign (2021)

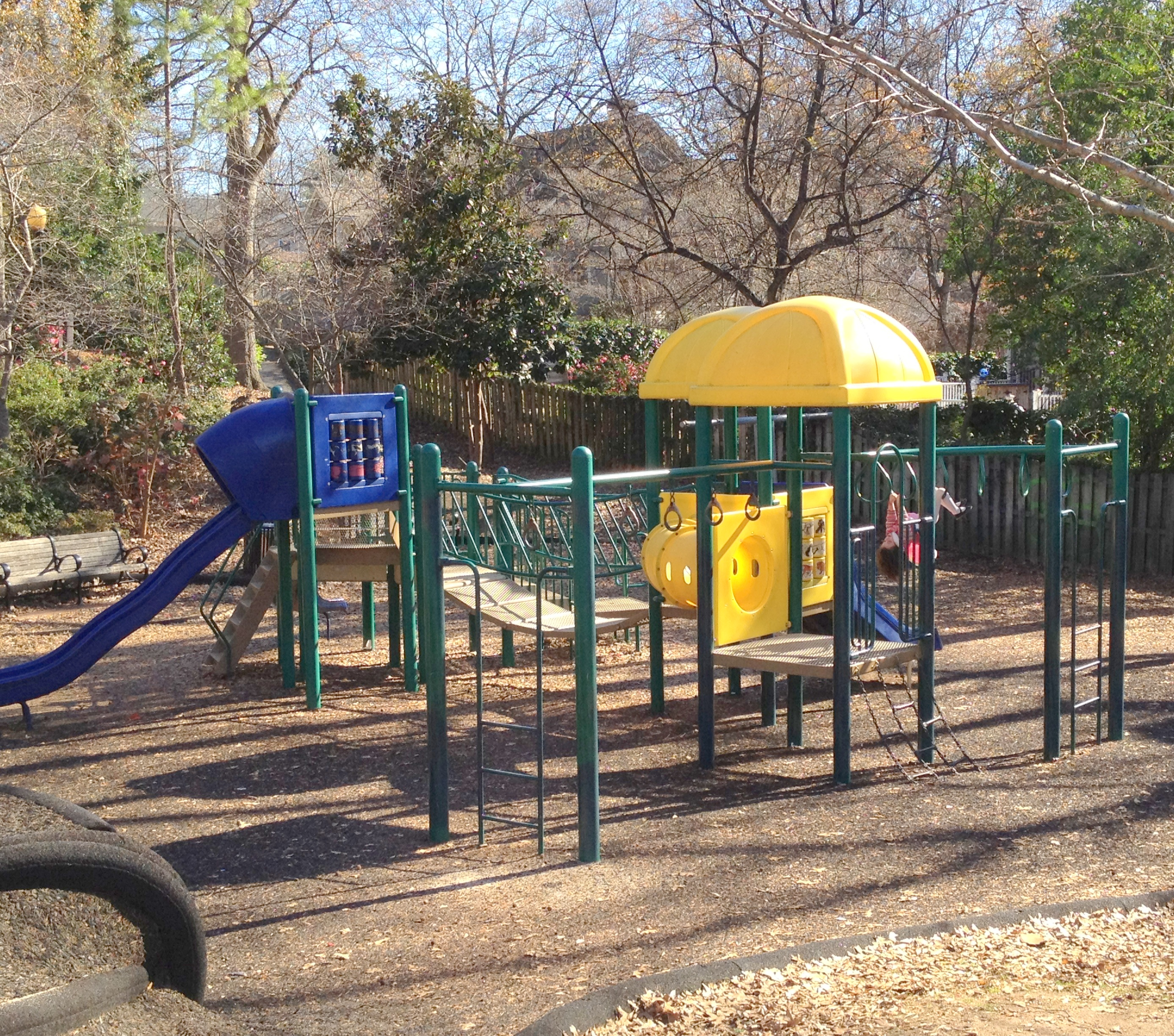
Cunard Memorial Playground

Cunard Memorial Playground marker

Cunard Memorial Playground marker

Cunard Memorial Playground marker

== See also ==
- Atlanta freeway revolts
- History of Virginia–Highland
- Freedom Park
- List of parks in Atlanta
