= John Howell (activist) =

American civic activist

John Rushing Howell (November 7, 1933, Durant, Mississippi – June 28, 1988, Atlanta) was an Atlanta, Georgia grassroots civic activist, well known for his strong support of human rights, civil liberties, neighborhood preservation, and the arts.

As a resident of the Virginia-Highland neighborhood of northeast Atlanta, Howell was highly instrumental in stopping the construction of Interstate 485 through the neighborhood, thereby preserving one of Atlanta's vibrant and architecturally intact intown communities.

Howell served as the first president of the Virginia-Highland Civic Association; he was active in the Virginia-Highland Civic Fund until his death and served on many other community and civic boards. Employed by the Veterans Administration, Howell also served as chapter president of the Georgia American Civil Liberties Union, and on the city License Review Board. Professionally, Howell was a social worker in the area of alcohol and drug abuse. Howell died in 1988 from complications of HIV infection. He was buried in Mizpah Cemetery in his native Durant, Mississippi.

John Howell Memorial Park was dedicated to his memory in 1989. It occupies the site of 11 houses that were demolished to make way for the planned freeway. His activism prevented this and preserved the neighborhood.

== Background ==
Howell was the son of William Edgar Howell, who at one time was mayor of Durant, Mississippi.

== Links ==
- City of Atlanta, Park Locations, atlantaga.gov
