= I485 =

I-485 may refer to:

- Interstate 485 - Interstate Highway (beltway) around Charlotte, North Carolina, US
- Interstate 485 (Georgia) - proposed but never constructed highway in Georgia, US
- Form I-485 ("Application to Register Permanent Residence or to Adjust Status") - a form required for becoming a permanent resident of the United States
