= Buckhead Coalition =

Civic and business coalition in Atlanta

- Formation: 1988
- Founder: Sam Massell
- Type: Nonprofit organization
- Legal status: Active
- Purpose: Civic and economic advocacy for the Buckhead district of Atlanta
- Headquarters: Atlanta, Georgia, U.S.
- Region served: Buckhead, Atlanta
- President and CEO: Katharine Kelley
- Key people: Sam Massell (founding president, 1988–2020); Jim Durrett (president, 2020–2026); Jonathan Rodbell (chairman, 2025–present)
- Website: thebuckheadcoalition.com

The Buckhead Coalition is an invitation-only nonprofit organization of business and civic leaders in the Buckhead district of Atlanta, Georgia, founded in 1988 by former Atlanta mayor Sam Massell. The organization helped establish the Atlanta Police Foundation in the early 2000s and advocated for the creation of the Buckhead Community Improvement District in 1999. It was one of the leading institutional opponents of the Buckhead cityhood movement of 2021–2022, a proposal to separate Buckhead from the city of Atlanta.

== History ==
=== Founding ===
The Buckhead Coalition was founded in 1988 as a private nonprofit corporation by about 75 chief executives of Buckhead-based firms, with Massell, who served as Atlanta's mayor from 1970 to 1974, as its founding president. The Marietta Daily Journal described the organization as a "chamber-like, invitation-only organization" whose membership had grown to about 100 chief executives by 2019. Massell led the organization for 32 years, until his retirement in 2020, and was informally known in Atlanta as the "Mayor of Buckhead."

Under Massell's leadership, the Coalition advocated for the construction of Georgia 400 through Buckhead and for the related extension of MARTA's Red Line. The organization also advocated for the creation of the Buckhead Community Improvement District, a self-taxing commercial property district that was established in 1999 and subsequently spun off as a separate organization.

=== Atlanta Police Foundation ===
In early 2003, the Buckhead Coalition was one of three Atlanta business associations, alongside Central Atlanta Progress and Midtown Alliance, that provided start-up financial and logistical support for the newly created Atlanta Police Foundation, including helping to establish its governing board. Massell, then president of the Buckhead Coalition, was quoted by The Atlanta Journal-Constitution at the time saying a police foundation "will make a big difference in Atlanta." The Coalition's public safety efforts have continued in subsequent years through reward programs and coordination with the Atlanta Police Department's Zone 2 precinct, which covers Buckhead.

=== Leadership transition and alignment with the Buckhead CID ===
Following Massell's retirement, the boards of the Buckhead Coalition and the Buckhead Community Improvement District (CID) decided in 2020 to place both organizations under a single executive. Jim Durrett, who had served as executive director of the Buckhead CID since 2009, became president and CEO of the Buckhead Coalition while continuing to lead the CID. The two organizations also moved toward closer coordination with two other Buckhead groups, Livable Buckhead and the Buckhead Business Association.

=== Buckhead cityhood movement ===
Beginning in 2020 and 2021, a group called the Buckhead City Committee, led by Bill White, pushed for legislation that would allow Buckhead to secede from Atlanta and incorporate as a separate city, citing concerns about crime and city services. The Buckhead Coalition, along with the Buckhead Community Improvement District, the Buckhead Business Association, and Livable Buckhead, was among the first organizations to publicly oppose the proposal. In August 2021, the cityhood movement's leader sent an open letter to Buckhead Coalition members seeking their support, which The Atlanta Journal-Constitution reported on directly. The following month, after Durrett criticized the cityhood push at a press conference, White publicly accused the Coalition of "spewing lies and doomsday drivel." The cityhood proposal failed to advance in the Georgia legislature in 2022.

=== Recent leadership ===
Durrett announced his retirement from both the Buckhead Coalition and the Buckhead CID in mid-2025, effective in early 2026, prompting a national search for his successor. In October 2025, the organization announced that Katharine Kelley would succeed Durrett as president and CEO of both the Buckhead Coalition and the Buckhead CID, a transition independently confirmed as complete at the Coalition's January 2026 annual luncheon.

== Governance ==
The Buckhead Coalition is led by a chairman and a president and CEO. Eric Tanenblatt served as chairman from 2023 to 2025, when he was succeeded by Jonathan Rodbell, co-founder of Atlanta Property Group, at the organization's January 2025 annual luncheon. Membership in the Coalition is by invitation only and capped at about 125 members, with annual dues reported to range from $6,000 to $9,000.

== See also ==
- Buckhead
- Sam Massell
- Midtown Alliance
- Self-taxing district
