= Central Atlanta Progress =

- Abbreviation: CAP
- Predecessor: Central Atlanta Improvement Association
- Formation: 1941; 85 years ago
- President: A.J. Robinson
- Website: https://www.atlantadowntown.com/cap

Central Atlanta Progress (CAP) is a private, not-for-profit corporation, chartered to plan and promote Atlanta's Central Area, that strives to create a robust economic climate for downtown Atlanta, Georgia, in the United States.

CAP was formed by a merger of the Central Atlanta Improvement Association, which was founded in 1941, with the Uptown Association on January 1, 1967.

Central Atlanta Progress (CAP) defines the central area as the central core of Atlanta bounded by the railroad cordon from West End on the south to Brookwood on the north and Boulevard on the east to Vine City on the west.

== First Central Area Study ==
The first Central Area Study of the city of Atlanta was performed by Central Atlanta Progress. Completed in 1971, the first Central Area Study (CAS I) dealt with the areas of economic development, transport, housing, urban design, public safety, human services, and marketing. The study focused on transport conditions and related land use and urban design in the areas proximate to downtown and midtown in Atlanta. The idea that attracted press attention was the "four level Peachtree corridor" concept which would have buried the vehicular travel along Peachtree Street below the surface of the current road.

=== Study Recommendations ===
The Study states

The Goal of this study is to recommend policies, plans, programs, and projects which will permit the study area - Central Atlanta - to reinforce its role as:

- Capitol [sic] of Georgia, and center of the metropolitan region;
- The cultural, educational, business, and transport center of the Southeast; -The focal point of a national and emerging international city; and
- A model in the field of improved human relations."

When the study was written, freeway (and tollway) mileage within the city was expected to be significantly more than it became. Among the abandoned highways were an I-85 separate from the Downtown Connector by the construction of a west-side freeway, construction of I-485 as an east-side parallel to the connector, extension of the Lakewood Freeway, and construction of the Stone Mountain Expressway and its symmetrical sister, the South Cobb Expressway to relieve I-75 northwest of the central business district. Fifty specific local surface street improvements were also recommended, at a cost of $69 million (of the total of $326 million in improvements recommended by the study.)

The writers of the first Central Area Study appreciated that it was unreasonable to expect that the streets and parking lots of the Central Business District (CBD) would be sufficient to accommodate every automobile whose occupants' desired to travel there. Therefore, the study strongly supported the construction of the MARTA heavy-rail system as one of the means to "intercept the automobile." As recommended by the first Central Area Study, the MARTA referendum was passed in November 1971.

Also part of this interception idea was a people-mover system designed to link some of the key interception points with downtown. This distribution system was imagined as an above ground, above vehicular right-of-ways, fixed guideway system.

CAS I saw the construction of MARTA rail as an extraordinary opportunity to accomplish several goals. The first of these was to impact land use around the rail stations in Fulton, DeKalb, and the City of Atlanta. "Land use plans, zoning and subdivision regulations should be altered to encourage high density residential and commercial development around the stations." The second opportunity brought about by the construction, and its inconvenience, was to simultaneously rebuild Peachtree Street as a four level transport corridor. This "Peachtree Promenade" would have converted the existing level of Peachtree Street to a pedestrian mall, with fountains and other urban design amenities. On the level immediately below the existing street, north-south vehicular traffic would run. Beneath this north-south spine would be two functions, east-west roadways on a separate grade from Peachtree, and the concourses for the MARTA stations. On the third below ground level would be MARTA rail lines. "The construction of the MARTA line along Peachtree will indeed be disruptive for a short time. However, the exploitation of the singular opportunity which this construction presents will result in a more efficient and attractive system of coping with the future. ... Failure to move boldly in this direction would be inexcusable." Only the MARTA line was built, and Peachtree remained a vehicular street with at grade intersections.

Other specific Urban Design projects recommended by CAS I included the creation of a multilevel Five Points Park and development of pedestrian malls on Broad Street and on Alabama Street. The study also performed an investigation into the area called "Railroad Gulch" which corresponds to the area just south of the Five Points area. For this area, the study recommended formulation of a three level movement system, involving pedestrian walkways and air-rights construction over the railroad lines and the MARTA station.

=== Forecasts ===
	1970	1983 (projected)	Actual
Population of Metro Area (millions)	1.4	2.1	2.2
General Office (million square feet)	17.6	28.9	21.5
Governmental Offices (million square feet)	6.1	8.1	
Retail Sales Area (million square feet)	4.1	5.2	
Hotels and Motels (rooms)	7,700	16,000	
Population of Central Area	136,487	107,535	99138
Housing (units)	51,200	45,200	
Employees	230,000	320,000	204,316

As with most planning studies, CASwas predicated on demographic forecasts, noted in the table. The forecasts anticipated too much growth in the central area as opposed to the rest of the Atlanta region. In particular, the amount of office space and the number of employees in downtown was overstated by a significant factor. The cities used as a model for the planners in the Central Area Study were older, more urban cities rather than the newer suburban form of faster growing cities in the southern and western US.

=== Study Adoption ===
At the time of the first Central Area Study, the CAP Policy Committee consisted of: Sam Massell, Mayor of the City of Atlanta; Wyche Fowler, Alderman; Ira Jackson, Alderman; Wade Mitchell, Alderman; Mills Lane, Chairman of Citizens and Southern Bank; and John Portman, President of Central Atlanta Progress. The Study Director was Robert Leary, the advisor was Robert Bivens, and the secretary was Collier Gladdin, who was Planning Director of the City of Atlanta.

On March 25, 1972, the first Central Area Study was delivered to the Aldermen of the City of Atlanta. Collier Gladdin, moved to achieve quick adoption of this program, which proposed to spend $326.7 million over 23 years to improve access and circulation in the central area of Atlanta. Gladdin did not want this to become another dust-gathering report, he said "We're going to keep it alive." The study itself cost $200,000 and was funded by the United States Department of Transportation, the City of Atlanta, and Central Atlanta Progress, Inc., and was developed under the guidance of an urban planner, Robert M. Leary, hired as study director, with the assistance of an eight member team. On the 30th of March, Alderman Wyche Fowler, while discussing the plan, stated that no group will ever adopt the plan to rebuild downtown in toto, but that they may approve it as a guide to development.

The idea that had grabbed the attention was the concept of a Four Level Peachtree Street, which had walkways for pedestrians, a rapid transit corridor, and streets for vehicle traffic, as well as automobile interceptor lots on the edge of the study area. At this time, John Portman was the President of Central Atlanta Progress, and one of the leading participants in the study. In April 1972, he boasted that Atlanta was one of under a handful of American cities which had a chance to solve its problems. He said "The Central Study can be one of the greatest tools in our history, if we'll only work together to make it happen, and now is the time to start." In the article appearing that day, the Constitution, in its usual manner of accurate reporting, increased the cost of the study to $300,000. Spring of 1972 was also the time that new officers were elected to the Board of Directors of CAP. Portman rival Thomas Cousins, developer of the off-Peachtree Omni complex, was made 1st Vice President.

A public hearing in late April was held to discuss the proposed plan, at which there was much discord over the proposal, with demagoguery reaching such heights that one speaker called it "an expensive and totally inappropriate tombstone to a city that committed suicide." The opponents were led by Kathryn Thompson, chair of the Virginia-Highlands Action Committee, and consisted of many environmentalists. It is worth noting that the plan would have converted over 15 square miles of Central Atlanta into pedestrian malls and parks if it had been fully implemented. Citizen complainants maintained that the Study would not solve the "traffic mess", that there should be more mass transit, that it "Paves Atlanta" when it should "Save Atlanta", that there was no citizen involvement in the plan, only reaction, that the money should be used for neighborhood parks, and that the urban design restrictions were too lax. Those endorsing the Central Area Study were a diverse sample of the planning community including Larry Gellerstadt who was President of the Atlanta Chamber of Commerce, a Vice President of MARTA, a representative of the state DOT, and a city Traffic Engineer, Clyde Robbins, a Vice President of Georgia Tech, and Steve Fuller, the chair of Underground Atlanta in its previous incarnation.

Voting to delay the approval or disapproval of the plan for two weeks on the sixteenth of October, the council avoided making a potentially controversial decision. This move disagreed with project supporter and member of the study's policy committee, Alderman Wyche Fowler, so much that he said "I don't think political pussyfooting on the part of some aldermen is going to win the day." The aldermen he was referring to were Chuck Driebe and Buddy Fowlkes, who offered an amendment that would receive the study as a guide for development with "no designated priorities", and subject to modification after the release of the then upcoming Atlanta Regional Commission's Regional Transportation Plan. Alderman Wade Mitchell moved to change the words "receive the plan" to "approve the plan", at which point Driebe moved to table the bill. Fowler, clearly unhappy with Driebe over this and other issues, said "Driebe knows additional language is superfluous and meaningless. I hope that any members of the board who do not feel that this is a unique study by both the public and the private sector that provides us a chance to channel our growth in an orderly fashion will have the guts to say so." The issue underlying approval of the Central Area Study and causing all of the nastiness was the charter revision, over which Driebe and Fowler had disagreements. Another reason for the opposition was because of the suggestion of the construction of tollways through inner city areas. Aldermen Panke Bradley, Nick Lambros, and Chuck Driebe introduced legislation calling on the state of Georgia to stop tollway planning until the Atlanta Regional Commission prepared and the aldermanic council approved an alternative to the regional transport problem.

On the fourth of November, the Atlanta Constitution published an editorial; it said in part:

we hope that the aldermen will adopt it as a guideline for the future. We would emphasize that action by the board would not commit the city or the aldermanic board to any specific project or priority of the Central Area Study. But it would commit the city to principles of sound planning for the future, whatever detailed decisions have to be made later. We think that is important.

The Aldermen finally approved the Central Area Study on November 7, 1972. Mayor Sam Massell proposed a compromise measure of which he said "Such approval does not carry with it or imply the prior approval of any specific program or project which is proposed or might be represented to implement said plan." and "Each individual improvement contained in this report must meet the test of careful study at the appropriate time to determine its applicability, financial feasibility, and impact prior to being submitted to the effected committee of the mayor and Board of Aldermen."

After this compromise was introduced, only Alderman Cecil Turner voted against the substitute resolution, because he wanted to substitute for accepting the study a statement which called the study "an acceptable statement of plans and goals for downtown Atlanta. Alderman Fowler called Turner's proposal "legal jabberwocky designed to delay, frustrate and hinder the planning process."

== Second Central Area Study ==
Cochaired by Mayor Andrew Young, Jim Edwards, and Frank Carter, the second Central Area Study (CAS II) was begun in the fall of 1985 and completed in 1987. Like the first study, CAS II was a joint effort with the City of Atlanta and Fulton County. The policy board guiding the study was divided into seven task forces dealing with strategic planning, conventions and tourism, transport and infrastructure, recreation and the arts, public safety, retail and commercial, and housing. "The primary goal of CAS II is the creation of both the image and reality of Atlanta as a safe and clean city" and "The top priority of CAS II is to make the Central Area more livable and inviting to people."

The second Central Area Study promoted what it called "Pedestrian Peachtree", and said "We want buildings and public spaces designed so that they are hospitable to people. We want retail shops to face the sidewalks so that people are invited in, not shops buried deep within buildings that turn their backs on pedestrians and visitors." This last point is clearly aimed at John Portman's Peachtree Center complex which has very little street frontage of shops, but has an indoor mall. The idea of the Pedestrian Peachtree is a similar but scaled down version of what was proposed in the first Central Area Study.

CAS II proposed the creation of a Central Atlanta Retail Association. Three issues were to be the focus of this organization: maintenance of the environment, attracting shoppers, and recruiting and retaining desirable retail merchants. Along with a retail association, the study advocated better marketing of downtown, with the creation of a marketing association which would merchandise downtown attractions, create a central information center, and improve signage. Along with this, entertainment facilities are to be clustered in certain districts of the central area. The CARA was also charged with the maintenance of downtown. This means that it is to be responsible for coordinating the repair of sidewalks, waste disposal, and general cleanliness.

The task force on housing maintained that if Atlanta were to remain a 24 hour city, it would have to attract upper and middle income housing. A coordinating agency for housing development, Housing Urban Design Assistance Team (HUDAT), was proposed, although whether the agency was to be new or an already existing agency was undecided.

Making Atlanta a "clean and safe city" was one of the priorities of the study, and to meet this goal, it proposed that the central police zone be reconstituted to include Midtown as well as downtown. This proposal met with some controversy because it essentially proposed making a safe downtown more important than other areas, offending those in other areas.

Funding would be accomplished by the steering of public and private incentives to achieve certain goals. This would be used in particular for promotion of downtown housing and better urban design.

"The focus of CAS I, completed in 1971, was on improving transport and circulation in Central Atlanta." These recommendations, including, making Spring Street and West Peachtree one-way pairs, improving the interstate system, and the construction of a heavy-rail MARTA system, were generally implemented. CASII suggested further transport improvements, in particular benefitting pedestrian flow, including the creation of pedestrian malls and reducing vehicle-pedestrian conflictual interaction.

The fundamental difference between the two Central Atlanta Studies was not any particular recommendations. It is rather, that the first study focused on concrete achievable goals, the most important of which were achieved, while the second study much more heavily emphasized human resource type goals, whose success will be harder to measure and see. Improving safety, better marketing of downtown retail, and the creation of a "24 Hour City" are for the most part only able to be successful if they are perceived to be successful. From the point of view of downtown merchants, increased police will not have helped unless people feel safer, and spend more time downtown.

== Atlanta Downtown Improvement District ==
The Atlanta Downtown Improvement District (ADID), founded in 1995 by CAP, is a public-private partnership that strives to create a livable environment for Downtown Atlanta. With a Board of Directors of nine private and public-sector leaders, ADID is funded through a community improvement district within which commercial property owners pay special assessments.

According to their mission statements, Central Atlanta Progress and the Atlanta Downtown Improvement District are committed to a downtown for the diverse Atlanta community, including property owners, employees, residents, students and visitors.

Archives of Central Atlanta Progress are available at the Atlanta History Center.
