= Downtown Connector =

Highway in Georgia, United States

Downtown Connector
- James Wendell George Parkway

Route information
- Maintained by GDOT
- Length: 7.4 mi (11.9 km)
- Existed: 1952–present
- Component highways: I-75; I-85
- NHS: Entire route

Major junctions
- South end: I-75 / I-85 towards Hartsfield-Jackson Atlanta International Airport
- SR 166 in Atlanta; I-20 in Atlanta; SR 10 in Atlanta; US 29 / US 78 / US 278 / SR 8 in Atlanta
- North end: I-75 / I-85 in Midtown Atlanta

Location
- Country: United States
- State: Georgia
- County: Fulton

Highway system
- Interstate Highway System; Main; Auxiliary; Suffixed; Business; Future; Georgia State Highway System; Interstate; US; State; Special
← SR 294S	SR 295	→ SR 296

In Downtown Atlanta, the Downtown Connector or 75/85 (pronounced "seventy-five eighty-five") is the concurrent section of Interstate 75 and Interstate 85 through the core of the city. Beginning at the I-85/Langford Parkway interchange, the Downtown Connector runs generally due north, meeting the west–east I-20 in the middle. Just north of this is the Grady Curve around Grady Memorial Hospital. Continuing north, the terminus of the Downtown Connector is the Brookwood Interchange or Brookwood Split in the Brookwood area of the city. The overall length of the Downtown Connector is approximately 7.5 miles (12 km). Since the 2000s, it has been officially named James Wendell George Parkway for most of its length, although it is still designated the Connector in the mainstream. It also has unsigned designations State Route 401 (I-75) and State Route 403 (I-85) along its length, due to I-75 and I-85 having 400-series reference numbers. The Downtown Connector has one of the highest traffic volumes in the world, carrying more than 400,000 vehicles per day at its busiest location.

== Route description ==
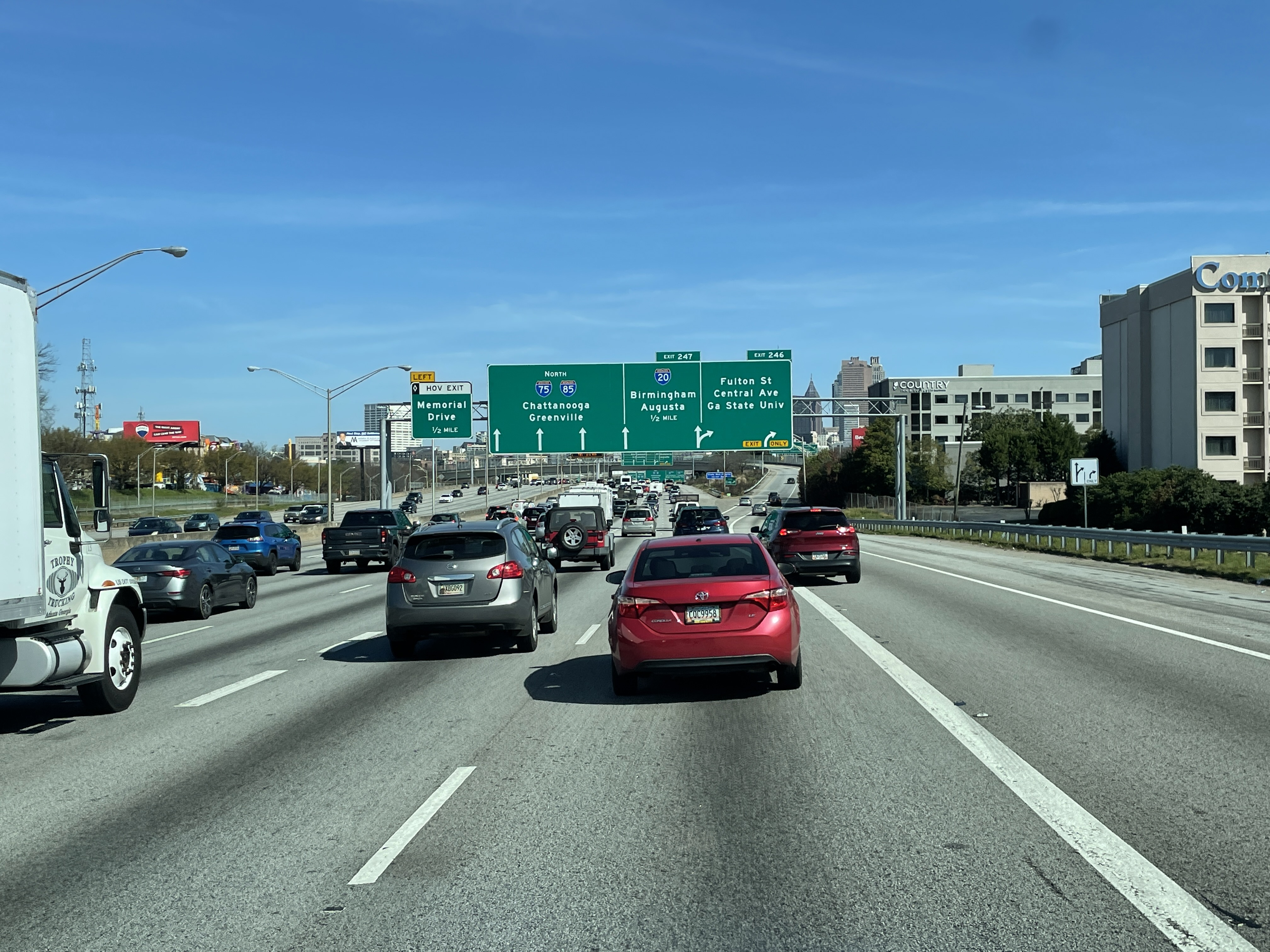
I-75/I-85 northbound approaching downtown Atlanta

The Downtown Connector carries more than 437,000 vehicles per day at its busiest point — just south of 10th Street in Midtown, while the least traveled portion carries 243,000 vehicles per day — just south of Fulton Street, near the interchange with Interstate 20. The area around the connector and associated interchanges are considered one of the ten-most congested stretches of interstate in the U.S. Due to this fact, many motorists often compare Atlanta to Los Angeles, which is also known for its notoriously-congested freeway system.

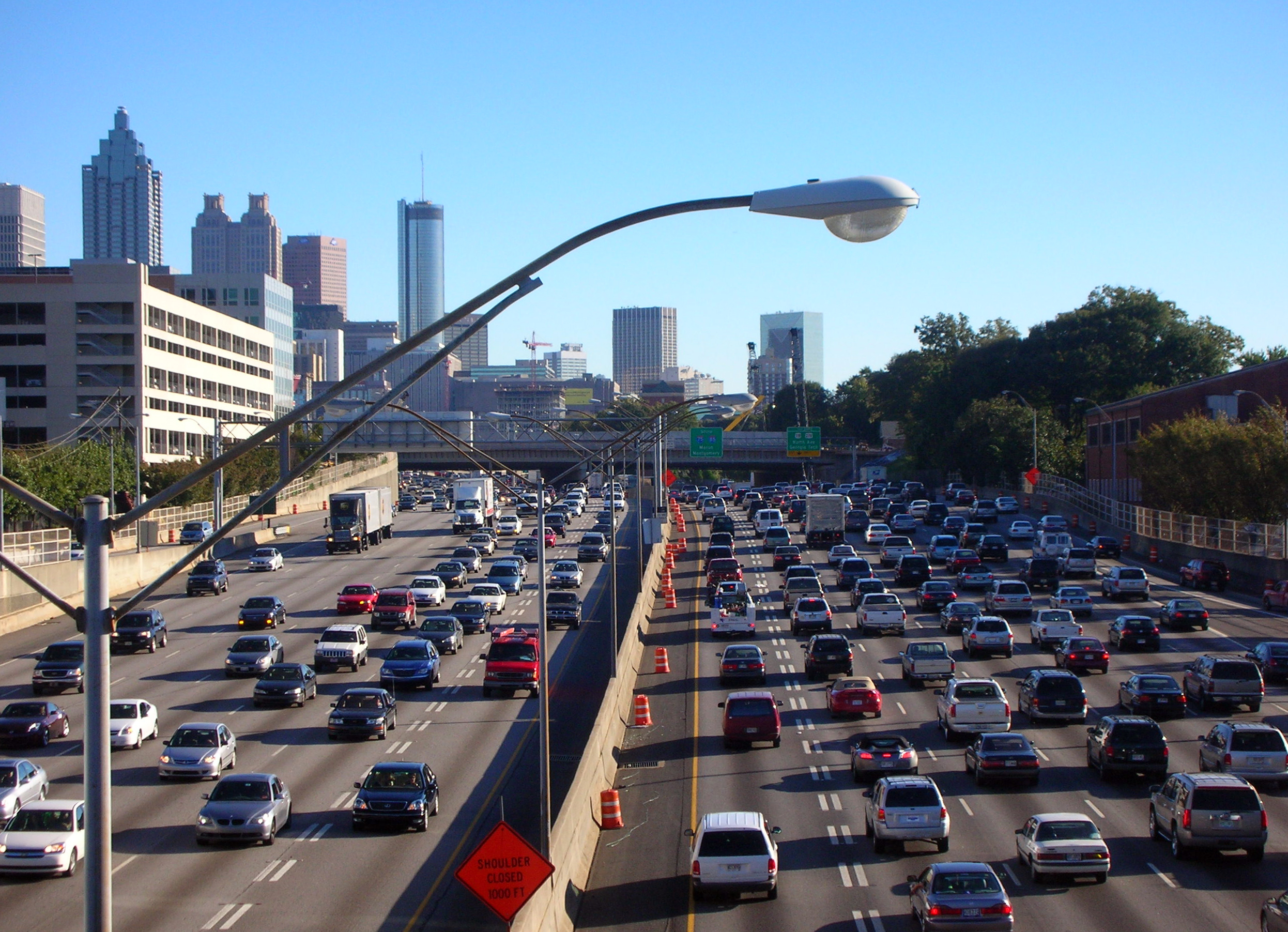
Downtown Connector view of the downtown skyline

The highway is fully instrumented with Intelligent transportation system (ITS) devices. There are more than 25 closed-circuit television cameras between the Langford Parkway interchange (south end) and the Brookwood Interchange (north end). Additionally, the Downtown Connector has three large overhead electronic message signs, and four smaller HOV-dedicated message signs on the median barrier wall. Traffic flow data is gathered through a video detection system, using pole-mounted black-and-white cameras spaced every 1/3 mile (0.54 km) on both sides of the roadway. All video and data is fed into the GDOT's Transportation Management Center (TMC), via fiber-optic cable located under the shoulders of the roadway. Virtually all entrance ramps are metered, with the exception of the freeway-to-freeway connection ramps from I-20. As with every other freeway inside the Perimeter, the Downtown Connector is lined with streetlights mounted in the center median, with high-mast lighting at major interchanges.

Atlanta's skyline, both Downtown and Midtown, can be seen from the highway, especially at the northern and southern ends.

== History ==
=== Planning and initial construction ===
On December 14, 1944, the Georgia State Highway Department, the predecessor agency to the Georgia Department of Transportation (GDOT), collaborated with the city of Atlanta, Fulton County, and the Bureau of Public Roads (BPR), the predecessor to the Federal Highway Administration (FHWA) to work on a plan to improve traffic and connectivity within the Atlanta area. Chicago-based H.W. Lochner & Company, a transportation engineering firm which had been formed earlier that year, was hired to provide a comprehensive transportation plan for the region, using data conducted by the BPR and the state highway department from 1936 to 1945, and future growth projections. The report, which was released on January 10, 1946, recommended a total of six radiating expressways be constructed in the city, with the intent of being integrated into what later became the Interstate Highway System, which at the time was expected to eventually be authorized by Congress. The report recommended that four of these expressways converge into a single north-south route through downtown, which was referred to at the time as both the "Downtown Connector" and the "Downtown Connector Expressway".

Work of the first section of the Downtown Connector, located between Williams Street and the Brookwood Interchange, as well as the approximately 1/3 mi (0.54 km) stretch of what is now I-85 north to Peachtree Street, began in September 1948, and was dedicated and opened to traffic on September 25, 1951. Work on a southern stretch of the Connector, a 1.4-mile (2.3 km) section between University Avenue and Richardson Street, began in March 1955, and was dedicated and opened on July 25, 1957. The 0.6 mi-long (0.97 km) stretch from Piedmont Avenue to Williams Street opened on May 5, 1959. Construction on the final stretch, the 2.3-mile (3.7 km) stretch between Richardson Street and Piedmont Avenue, including the interchange with I-20, began on February 26, 1962, and was opened to traffic on September 18, 1964. A ribbon-cutting ceremony for the Downtown Connector, attended by Governor Carl Sanders, FHWA administrator Rex Marion Whitton, and Atlanta mayor Ivan Allen Jr. was held inside the Georgia State Capitol on October 15, 1964.

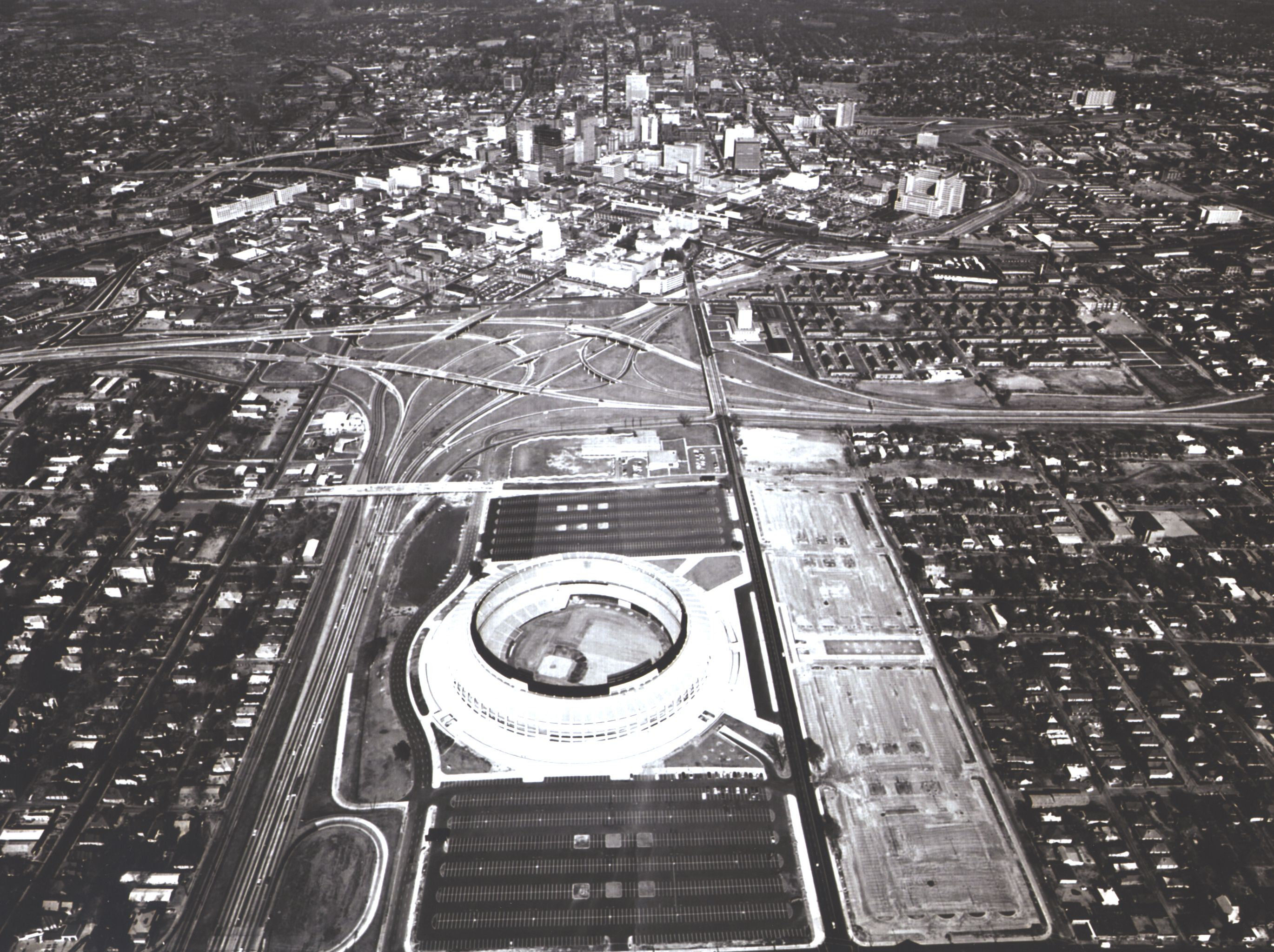
Interchange with I-20 in 1966, Atlanta–Fulton County Stadium visible in the foreground

Initial construction of the highway displaced parts of Techwood Drive and Williams Street in Midtown Atlanta. It also destroyed street grids east and south of downtown, dividing Sweet Auburn in two and the interchange with I-20 leveling the northern part of the Washington-Rawson district. The proposed I-485 was originally planned by the Georgia Department of Transportation to carry some south–north traffic through the eastern side of the city, but most of this faced extensive public opposition and was canceled in the 1970s by the then-governor of Georgia, Jimmy Carter. Parts of that road are now I-675 and SR 400.

=== Reconstruction ===
The highway was heavily reconstructed during the 1980s as part of GDOT's Freeing the Freeways program to widen Atlanta-area freeways, with most of the Connector's width being doubled from three to six or seven lanes in each direction. The project included work to increase lanes from six to eight on I-20, I-75, I-85, and I-285 ("The Perimeter"), as well as ten lanes on the downtown connector, involving a total of 126 miles (203 km) and was phased over 13 years between 1976 and 1989. The improvement campaign also included elimination of sharp curves and grades, left-hand exits, excessive interchanges, and short acceleration/deceleration lanes.

So as to offer a bypass around construction through the center of the city, the perimeter road (I-285) was completed first. The radiating expressways were then upgraded, and the last phase was reconstruction of the depressed sections through downtown Atlanta. By June 1983, some $252 million in discretionary funds had been used to complete most of the highways save for some major interchanges and the downtown section. Reconstruction of the first section, 2.1 miles (3.4 km) between Williams Street and I-75, occurred between July 1981 and July 1985. This project also included extensive reconstruction of the Brookwood Interchange. Work on the next part of the connector began in 1984, and it included redesigning the massive interchange between I-20 and I-75/85 at Memorial Drive where much of the mileage was on structure. The Downtown Connector was widened from six to ten through lanes, and this required quite a bit of right of way acquisition. Many bridges, including the 55 over the connector portion alone, had to be designed and built. 4.4 miles (7.1 km) of this section proved to be the most complicated project in the Freeing the Freeways program. The final portion of the reconstruction, 2.3 miles (3.7 km) between Georgia Avenue and North Avenue, opened on May 15, 1989, after many years of delays. In addition to the general-purpose lanes, provisions for high-occupancy vehicle (HOV) lanes and dedicated on-ramps at Williams Street, Piedmont Avenue, and Memorial Drive were built, and were subsequently converted to HOV usage in 1996.

=== Later history ===
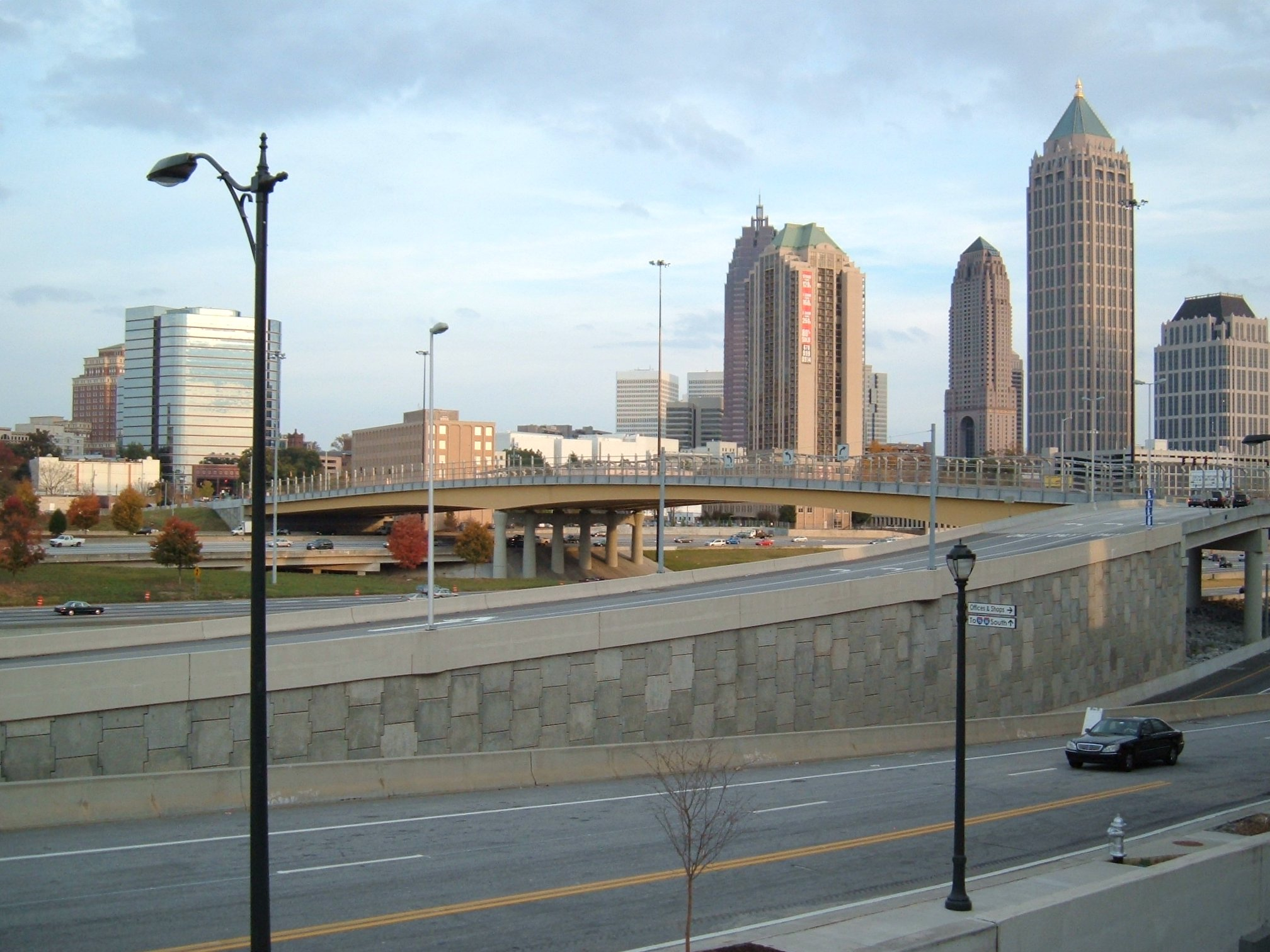
17th Street bridge, viewed from Atlantic Station

Between 2000 and 2004, the six-lane wide 17th Street Bridge was constructed over the Brookwood Interchange, connecting Midtown Atlanta with the then-new Atlantic Station development. In 2008, reconstruction of the 14th Street Bridge took place in order to accommodate increased traffic flow and pedestrian amenities. This work also included the construction of two new off-ramps: a southbound ramp to 10th Street, and a northbound ramp to 17th Street. This work was completed on May 28, 2010.

In early January 2010, a section of the highway between 14th and 17th streets developed an unusual problem dubbed "phantom ice" during a prolonged cold wave that kept temperatures below freezing for several days in the Atlanta region. GDOT engineers believe that heavy rain in previous months raised the water table and caused it to seep upward through joints between lanes, where it subsequently froze. Commuter traffic was stopped briefly on at least two days in order to treat it with deicing materials and inspect the freeway to determine the cause.

In January 2016, GDOT started a study of the Downtown Connector. Citing high levels of congestion that occur outside of peak periods, the purpose of the study is to gather data and explore options for reducing congestion. Data collection took place all year in 2016, and the data is being analyzed and options evaluated throughout 2017 and 2018. The study is expected to be completed in 2019. The study has already released their data on their website, including nine "Hot Spots", or dangerous and congested points that could most benefit from design improvements, and a detailed analysis of traffic in the whole metro area and how it relates to traffic on the Downtown Connector.

=== The Stitch ===
Location of the Stitch in Downtown Atlanta

The Stitch is a proposed engineering project that would see portions of the Downtown Connector capped and covered with public greenspaces. In August 2016, Central Atlanta Progress (CAP) announced plans to cover the Downtown Connector, converting it to a subterranean roadway and building a series of greenspaces on top of the road to cover an area of approximately 14 acres (5.7 ha), similar to Klyde Warren Park in Dallas. The proposal was first put forward by CAP as a way to reclaim land area taken by the Downtown Connector.

Similar discussions had been held at CAP as early as 2003 and have included similar proposals for the area near the Georgia State Capitol.

This project was drafted by Jacobs Engineering Group and is called "The Stitch", as one of the intents of the project would be to "stitch" together roads that had been divided with the creation of the Downtown Connector. The study, prepared for CAP by Jacobs Engineering Group at a cost of $100,000, called for a 14-acre (5.7 ha) stretch of reclaimed land covering a 0.75-mile-long (1.21 km) stretch of the Downtown Connector from Spring Street to Piedmont Avenue in downtown. The study, which compared the project to the Klyde Warren Park in Dallas, said the project would cost approximately $300 million and stimulate approximately $1.1 billion in land development and increased property value. Unlike Klyde Warren Park, The Stitch would involve the creation of multiple parks. The reclaimed land would also allow for the reconnection of Atlanta's street grid, which was interrupted by the construction of the Connector.

Between 2017 and 2018, CAP conducted a year-long viability study on the project that involved Jacobs and John Portman and Associates. In March 2019, the Urban Land Institute (ULI) published a feasibility study on the project, while that same month the estimated cost for the project was stated at $452 million. Advisors from the ULI estimated that the project could take four years of planning and pre-development and six years of construction.

As of 2019, the project was still in the pre-construction phase, with an estimated timeline and budget of ten years and $452 million, respectively.

In 2021, the Midtown Connector Project (MCP) Foundation released a proposal to build a park over 10 blocks of the Midtown portion of the Downtown Connector from North Avenue to 10th Street. The proposal connects that area of the city to the main campus of the Georgia Institute of Technology, which is located on the other side of the Interstate.

== Gallery ==
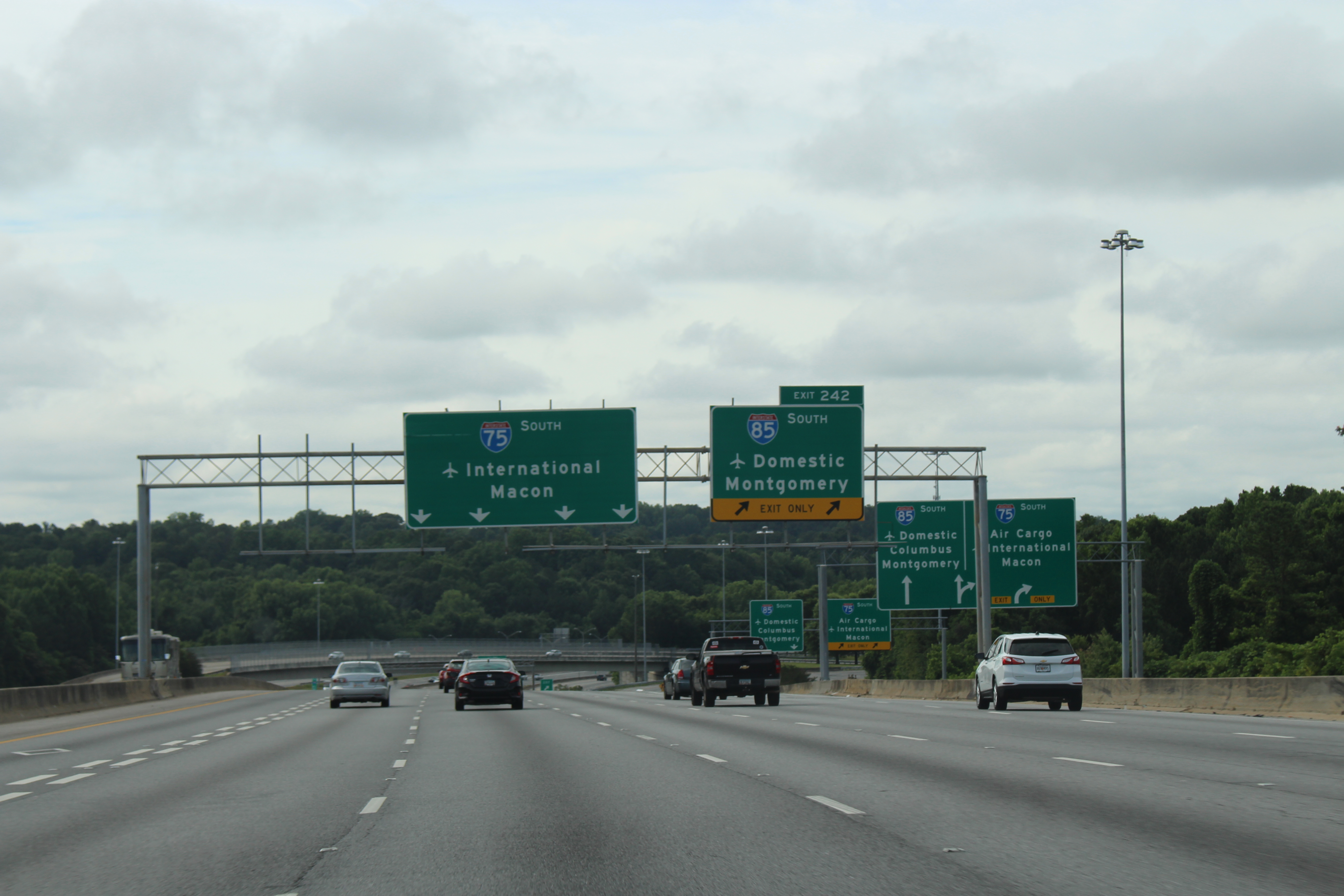
Southern end of the Downtown Connector where I-75 and I-85 diverge

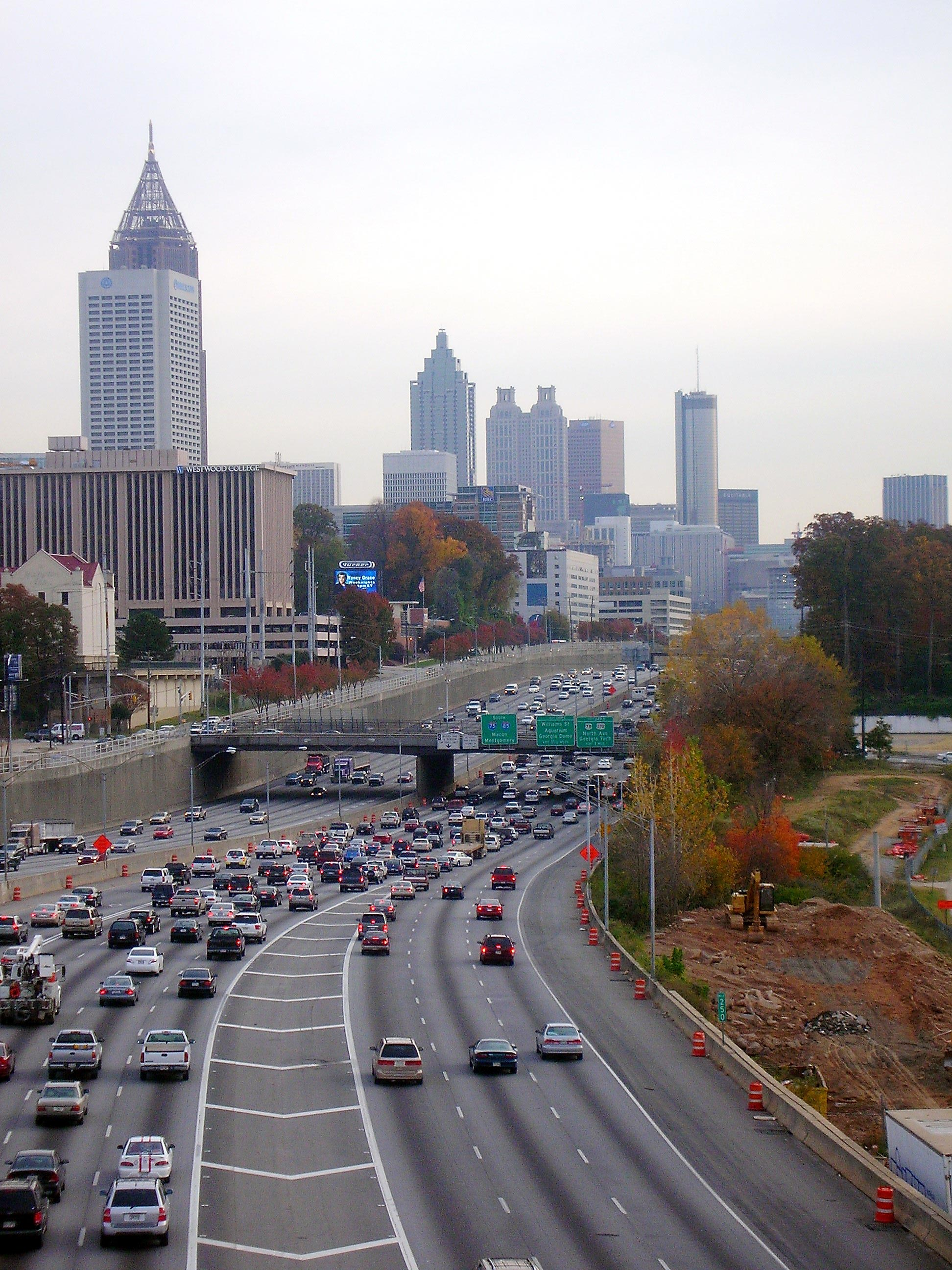
North end of the Downtown Connector where I-75 and I-85 converge in Midtown

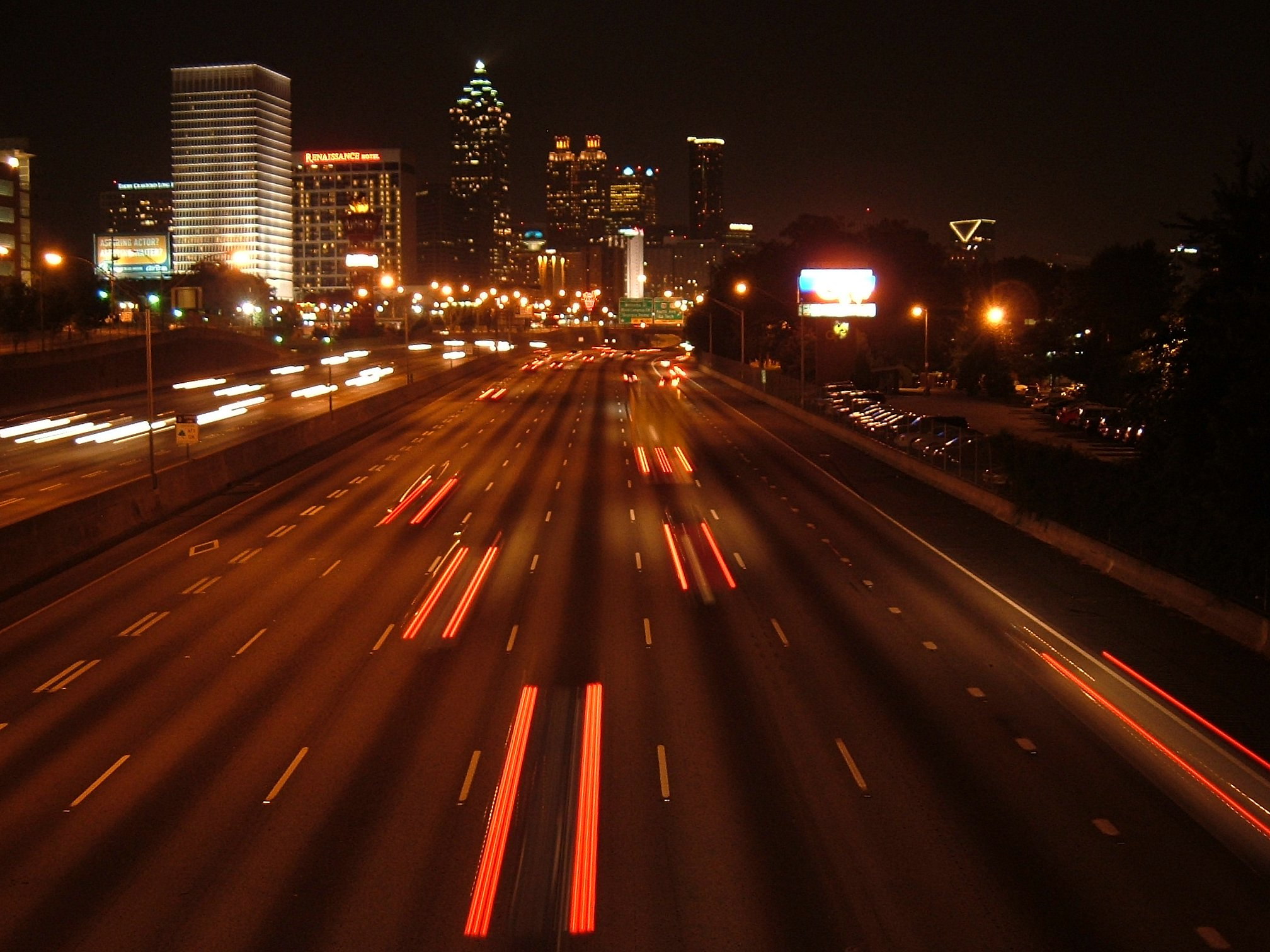
Downtown Connector facing south from Fifth Street bridge; nighttime view

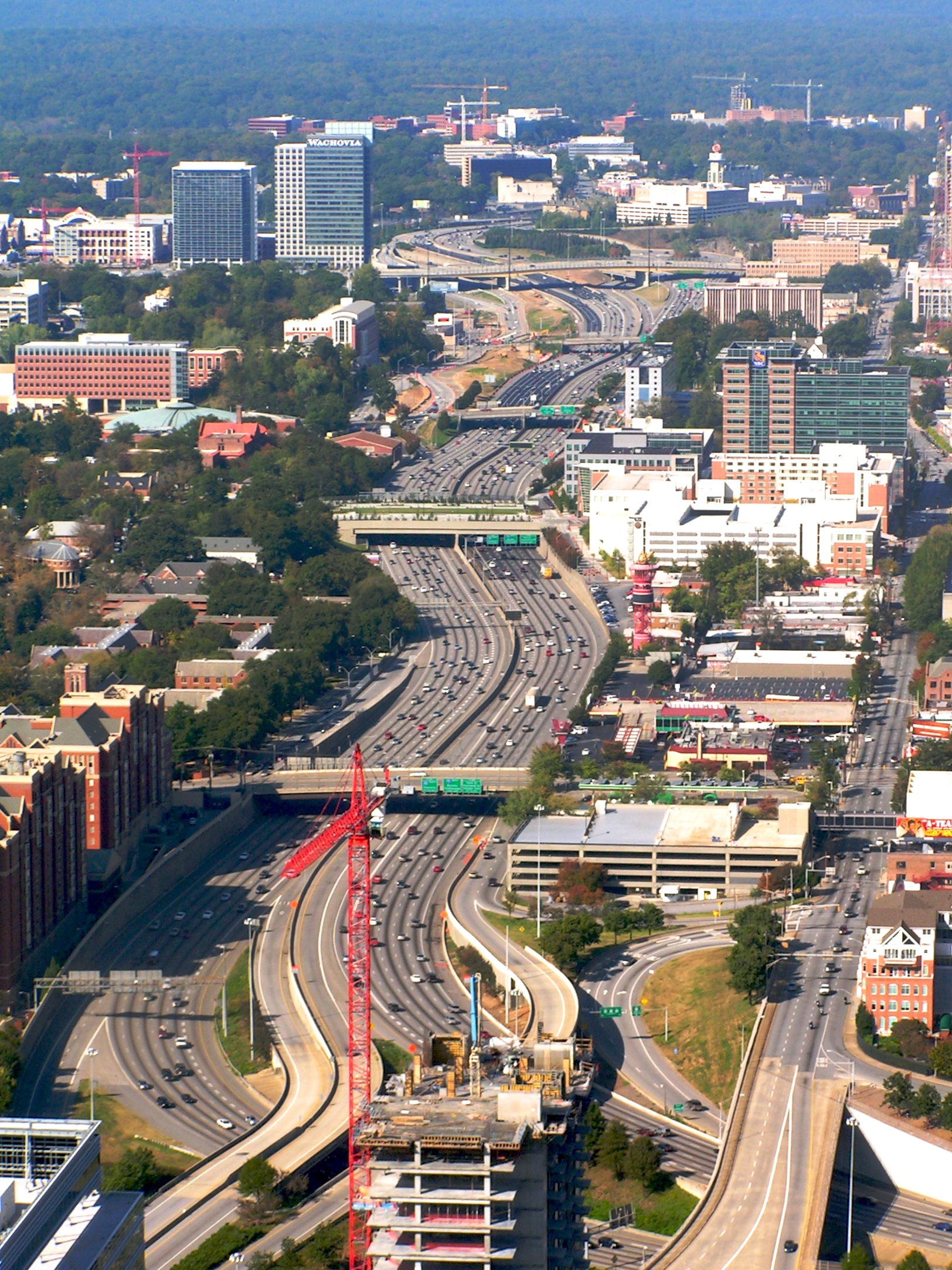
Aerial view of the Downtown Connector facing north from downtown

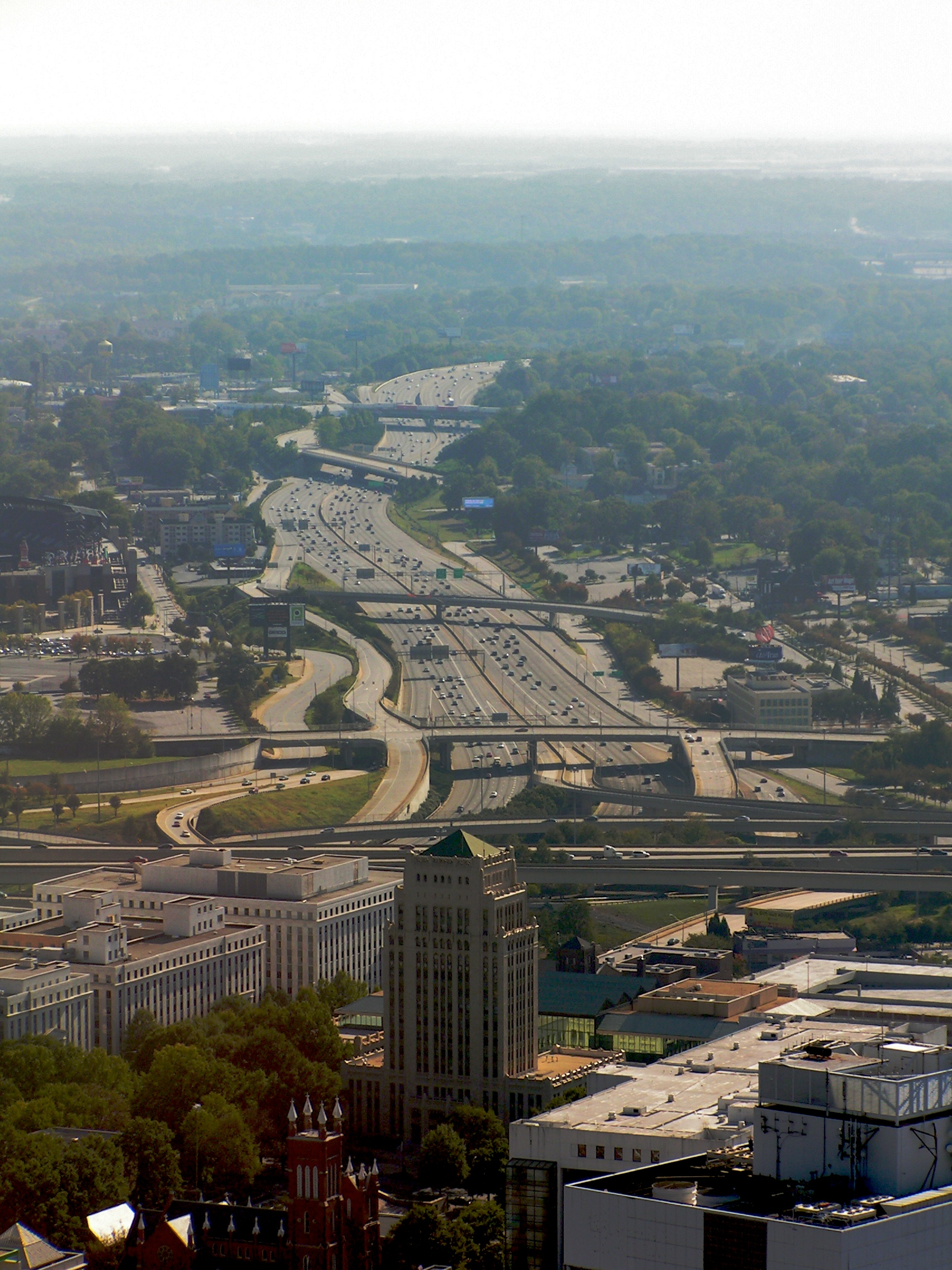
Aerial view of the Downtown Connector facing south from downtown

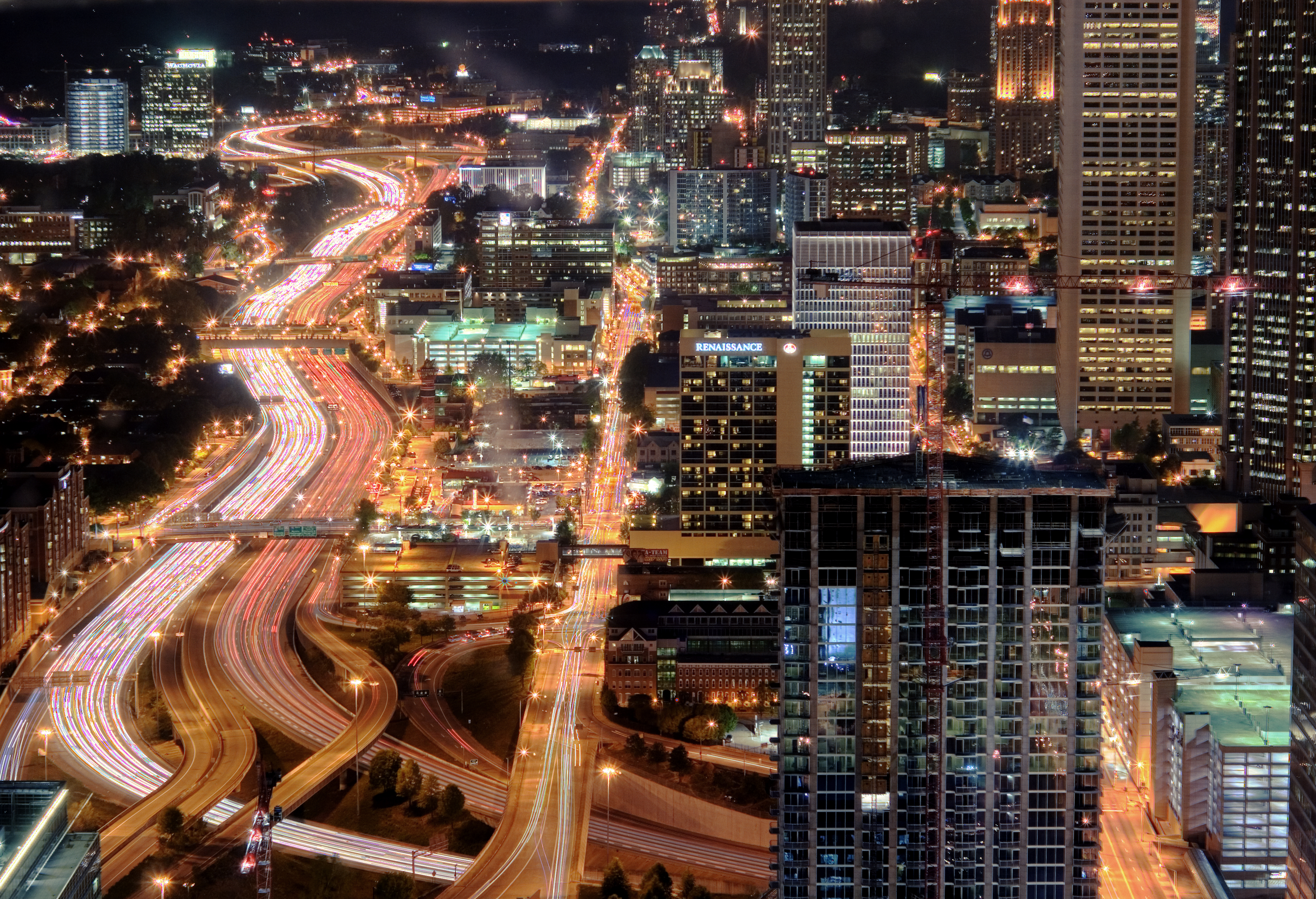
Atlanta Downtown Connector at night

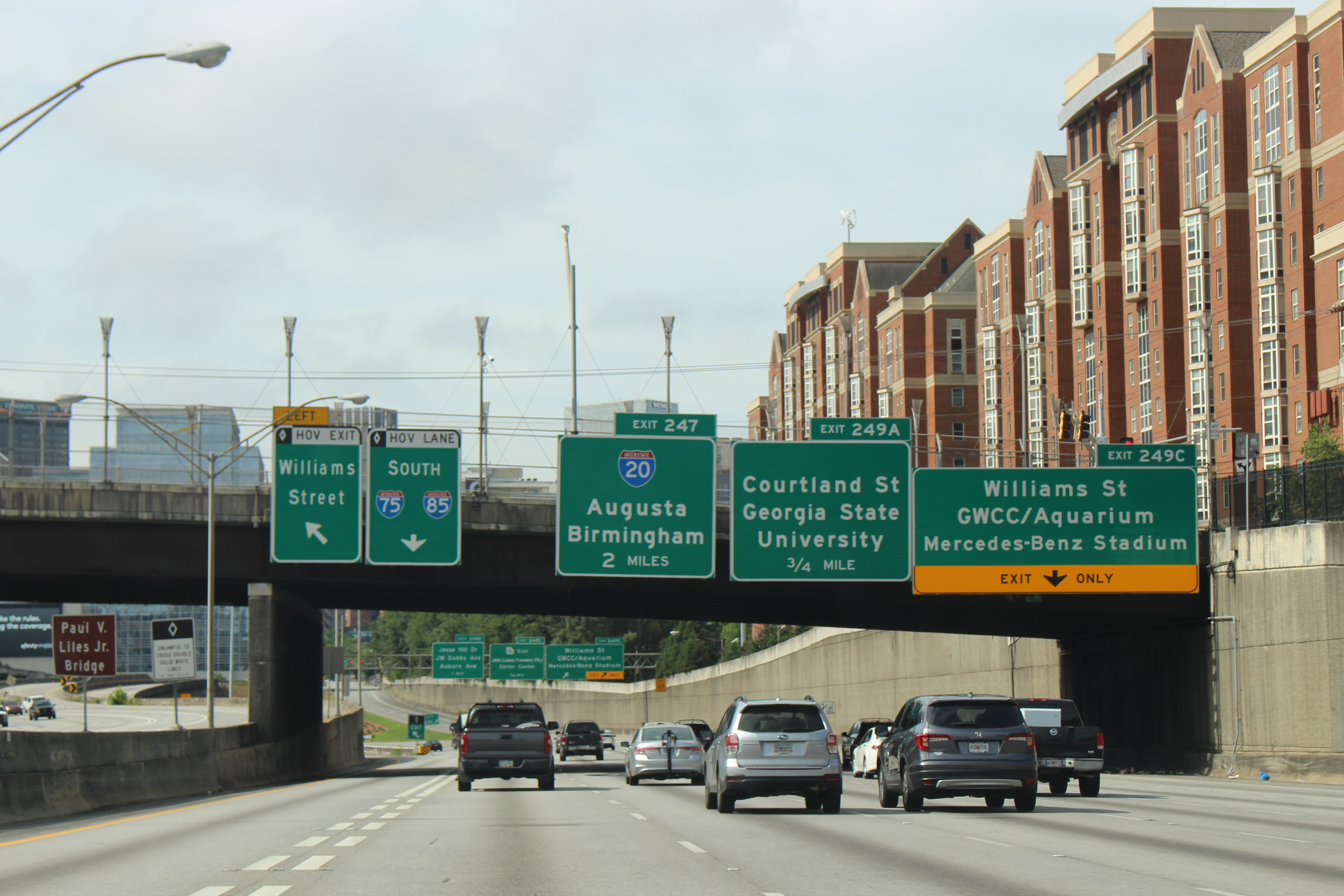
Downtown Connector at Williams Street looking south

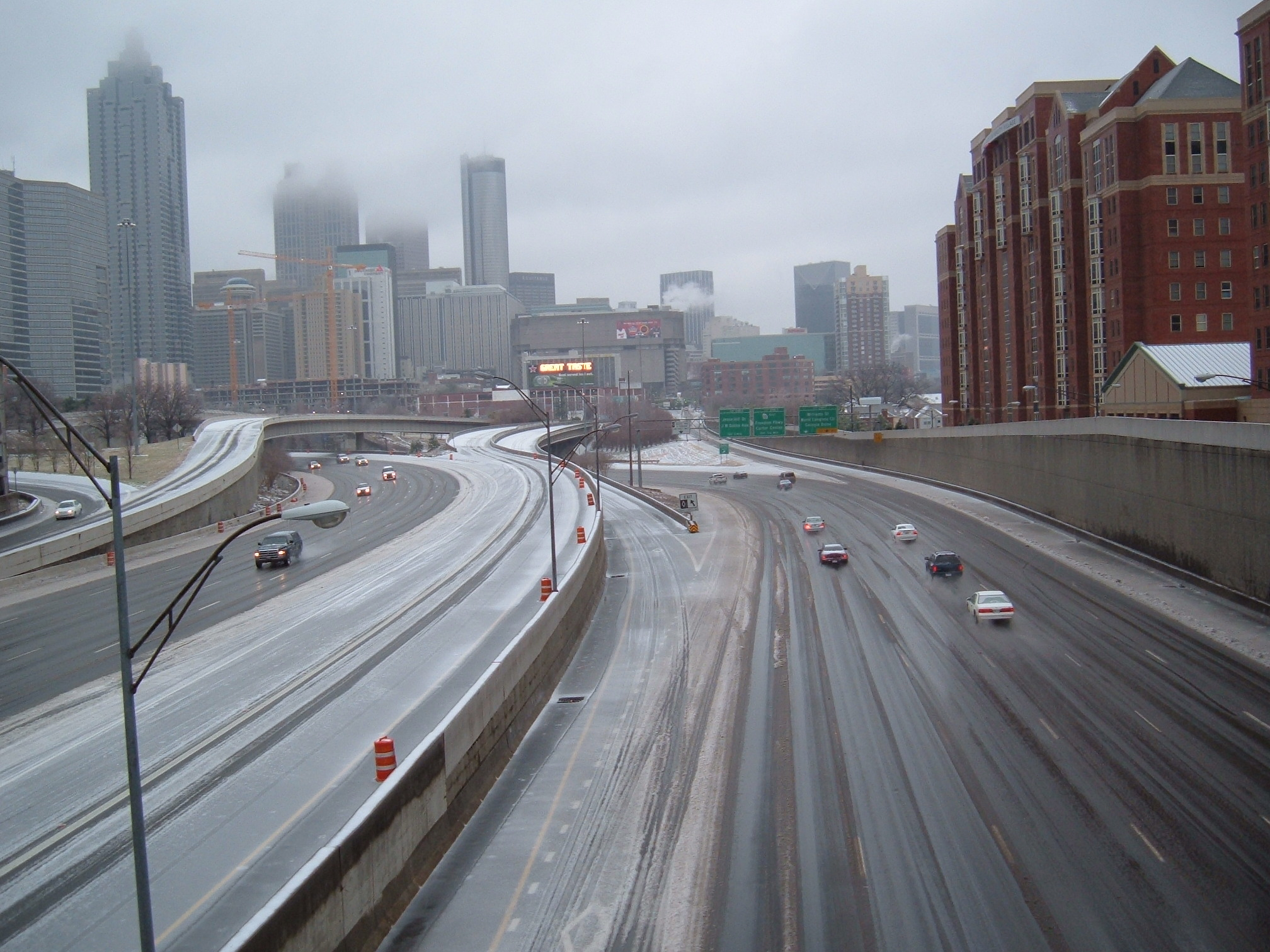
Downtown Connector at Williams Street looking south during the 2005 ice storm

== Exit list ==
Exit numbers follow the mileposts along I-75. The entire route is in Atlanta, Fulton County.

mi	km	Old exit	New exit	Destinations	Notes
0.0	0.0	87	242	I-75 south – ATL Airport (International and Air Cargo), Macon, Tampa I-85 south – ATL Airport (Domestic), Montgomery, Columbus, Auburn	Southern end of I-75/I-85 concurrency; southbound exit and northbound entrance; freeway continues with HOV lanes to and from I-75 to the south (no HOV ramps to or from I-85 to the south).
0.6	0.97	88	243	SR 166 (Langford Parkway) – East Point	
1.7	2.7	89	244	University Avenue / Pryor Street	
2.5	4.0	90	245	Abernathy Boulevard / Capitol Avenue – Georgia State Stadium (formerly Turner Field)	Northbound exit and southbound entrance
2.7	4.3	91	246	Fulton Street / Central Avenue – Downtown	Southbound has no exit to Central Avenue; entrance is from Pulliam Street.
3.2	5.1	92	247	I-20 (Ralph D. Abernathy Freeway) – Birmingham, Augusta	
3.1	5.0	—	—	Memorial Drive	HOV ramps for northbound exit and southbound entrance
3.9	6.3	93	248A	Martin Luther King Jr. Drive – State Capitol	Southbound exit and northbound entrance
4.4	7.1	94	248B	Edgewood Avenue / Auburn Avenue / J.W. Dobbs Avenue	Northbound exit and southbound entrance
4.6	7.4	96	248C	SR 10 east (Freedom Parkway) / Andrew Young International Boulevard – Carter Center	Western terminus of SR 10 and Freedom Parkway
5.0	8.0	95	248D	J.W. Dobbs Avenue / Edgewood Avenue	Southbound exit and northbound entrance
4.6	7.4	95A	—	Piedmont Avenue	HOV ramps for northbound exit and southbound entrance
5.5	8.9	97	249A	Courtland Street – Georgia State University	Southbound exit only
5.7	9.2	98	249B	Pine Street / Peachtree Street – Civic Center	Northbound exit only
5.8	9.3	99	249C	Williams Street – Georgia World Congress Center, State Farm Arena, Mercedes-Benz Stadium	No northbound exit
6.0	9.7	99	—	Williams Street	HOV ramps for southbound exit and northbound entrance
5.9	9.5	100	249D	Spring Street / West Peachtree Street	Northbound exit and southbound entrance
6.2	10.0	100	249D	To US 29 / US 78 / US 278 / SR 8 (North Avenue) – Georgia Tech	Southbound exit and northbound entrance
6.9	11.1	101	250	10th Street / 14th Street – Georgia Tech	Northbound exit and southbound entrance
6.7	10.8	102	250	16th Street / 14th Street / 10th Street	Southbound exit from and northbound entrance to I-75 only; I-85 has a southbound exit to 17th-14th-10th streets (exit 84) but no northbound entrance.
7.0	11.3	—	251A	17th Street – Midtown	Northbound exit only
7.4	11.9	103	251B	I-75 north – Marietta, Chattanooga I-85 north to SR 400 north – Greenville, Charlotte	Left exits in both directions; northern end of I-75/I-85 concurrency; main HOV lanes on Downtown Connector continue to and from I-85 to the north; freeway continues as I-75 beyond I-85 north with direct HOV ramps provided to and from I-75 to the north.
1.000 mi = 1.609 km; 1.000 km = 0.621 mi: Concurrency terminus; HOV only; Incomplete access
