= Atlanta freeway revolts =

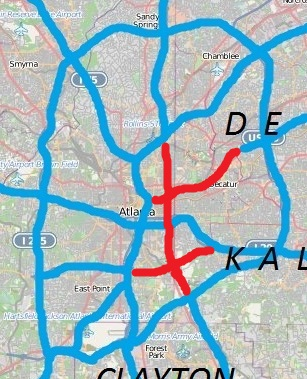
Unbuilt freeways in Atlanta in red: East-west routes: Stone Mountain Fwy at top, Langford Pkwy at bottom. North-south route: I-485/GA400

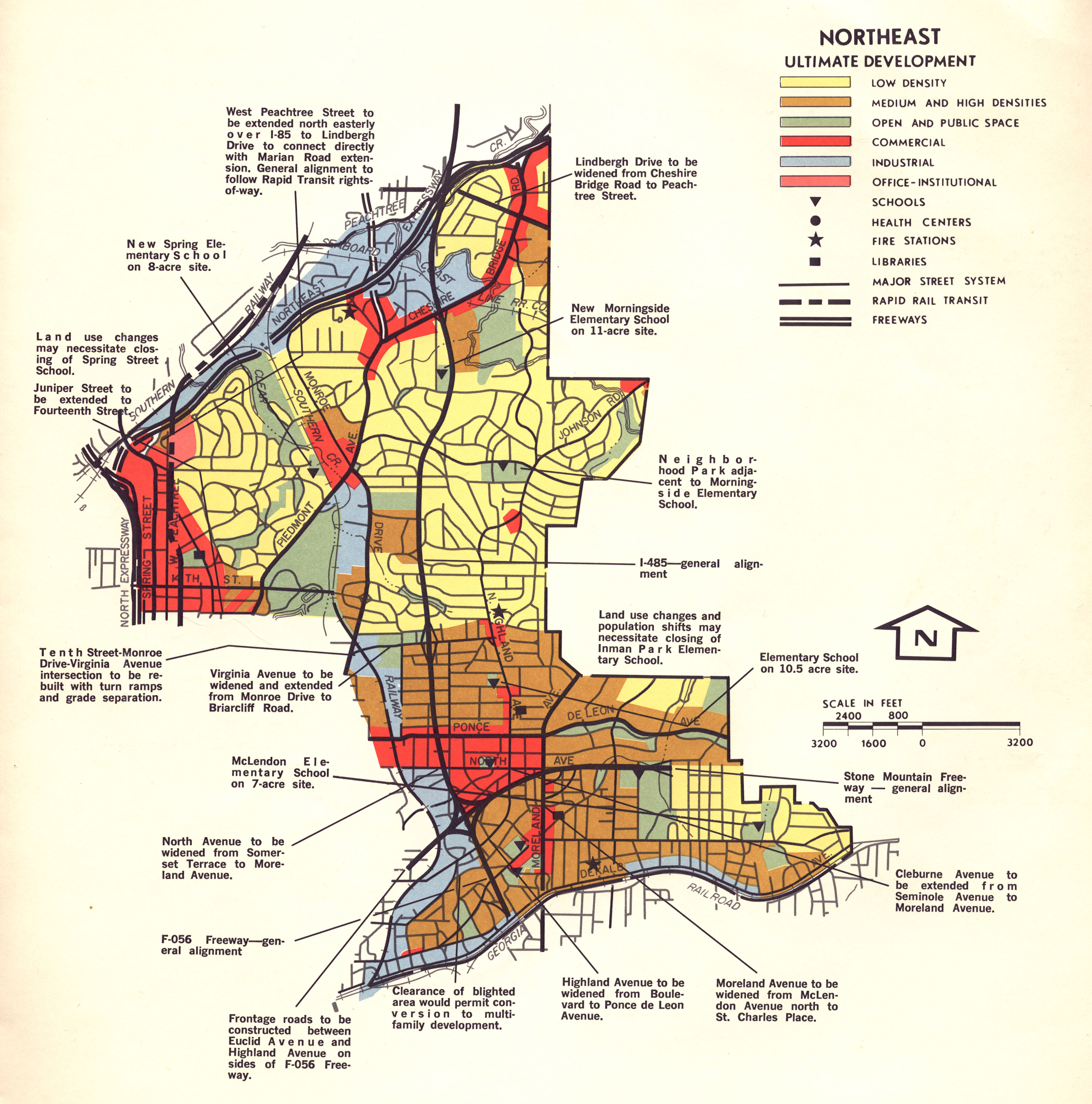
1970 map of proposed route of I-485 through northeast Atlanta

There have been multiple freeway revolts in Atlanta, Georgia, United States. The longest and most famous examples of Interstate opposition were against I-485 and the Stone Mountain Freeway through Intown Atlanta, lasting over 30 years, from the early 1960s until the final construction of Freedom Parkway on a small portion of the contested routes in 1994.

== I-485 and Stone Mountain Freeways ==
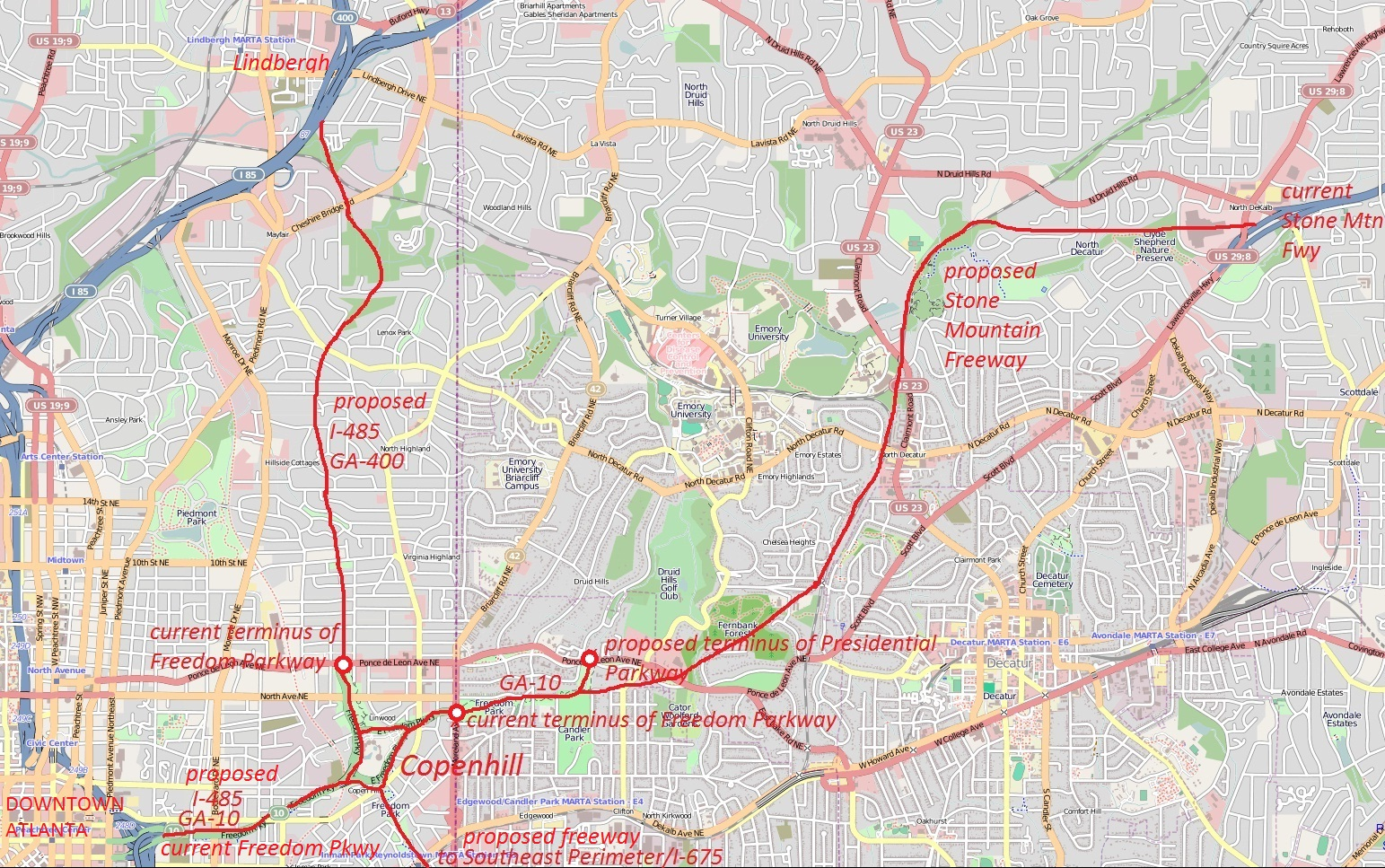

=== Location ===
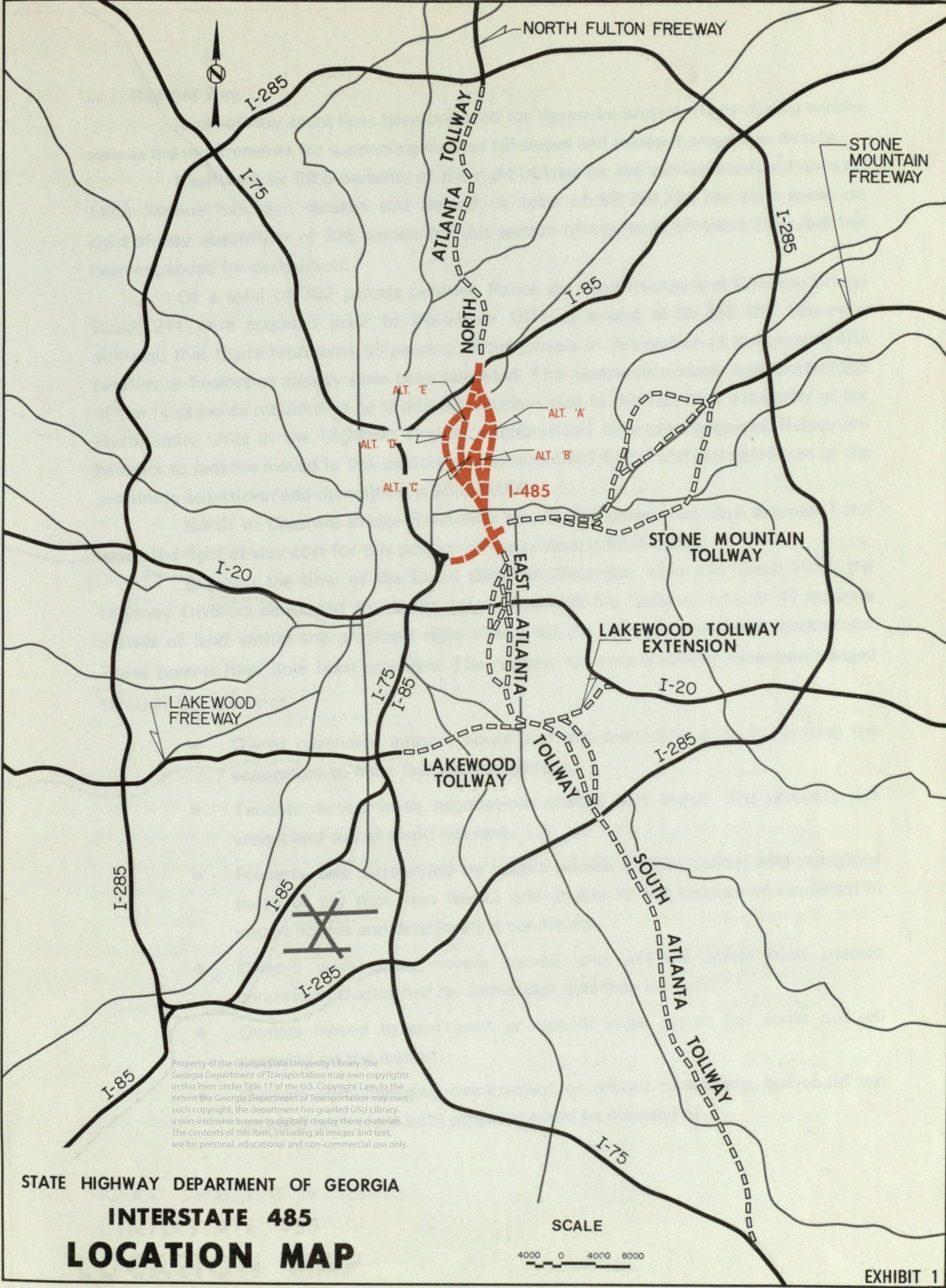
Proposed locations of I-485 as well as the proposed East Atlanta, Lakewood, North Atlanta, South Atlanta and Stone Mountain Tollways

The original plans for the Atlanta freeway system (map, p.2) included several freeways that were never built.

One was a north-south freeway parallel to, and 2–3 miles (3.2–4.8 km) east of today's Downtown Connector (I-75/85), connecting the southern end of today's Georgia 400 with I-675 at the southeast Perimeter.

- Georgia 400 would have continued south from its current terminus at I-85 near Lindbergh, through Morningside, Virginia-Highland, Poncey-Highland to Copenhill, the site of today's Carter Center (see detailed map of the route through Morningside and Virginia Highland)
- At Copenhill, there would have been an interchange with the east-west Stone Mountain Freeway
- The highway would have continued south roughly along Moreland Avenue, until the Perimeter, where it would have continued as today's I-675

Another was the east-west Stone Mountain Freeway, which:

- Would have begun in Downtown Atlanta and followed today's Freedom Parkway eastwards to Copenhill and the interchange with the north-south freeway
- Continued eastwards parallel to Ponce de Leon Avenue and Scott Boulevard until the northeast Perimeter, where it would have continued as today's Stone Mountain Freeway

Portions of the two highways were to bear the number I-485: the east-west highway from Downtown to Copenhill, and the north-south highway from Copenhill north to I-85.

=== Plans for new freeways ===
In 1964 the Georgia Highway Department (GHD) announced plans to build I-485. In May 1965, the Morningside Lenox Park Association (MLPA) was formed to fight the highway. MLPA hired planners who suggested an alternate route E, (map) roughly along the BeltLine from Ponce de Leon Avenue north to Ansley Mall and from there alongside Piedmont Road north to today's I-85/GA-400 interchange. In July 1965 a dueling civic association, the Morningside Monroe Civic Association (MMCA), was formed to fight Route E. In February 1966 the highway department definitively chose the original route (route B) through Morningside.

MLPA filed a lawsuit in October 1966 to try to stop construction and was denied; the appeal was denied in June 1967.

=== Success in stopping construction ===
Nonetheless the road was eventually stopped.

- During 1967–1970, the MLPA negotiated design changes with GHD, which bought time, and in 1971 another lawsuit was filed, this time via a PAC (neighborhood activists Virginia Taylor, Adele Northrup, Mary Davis, and Barbara Ray were instrumental in these efforts)
- National events creating momentum against further freeway construction in established residential areas:
  - Congress passed the National Environmental Policy Act in 1969
  - The Supreme Court ordered the Tennessee Department of Transportation (TDOT) to stop construction of Interstate 40 through a Memphis park
- From 1971–73 the Georgia DOT was headed by then Governor Jimmy Carter's ally Bert Lance, who continued to push for freeway construction.
- In Fall 1971 Virginia Highland residents led by Joseph Drolet founded the Virginia Highland Civic Association (VHCA) to fight the road, and a coalition was formed with residents of Inman Park and other neighborhoods
- In November 1971 the Atlanta Board of Aldermen rescinded their previous support for I-485 (Bert Lance appealed to them to reverse their stance); in June 1973 the aldermen strengthened their stance and passed a motion to actively oppose it
- In 1972 then-vice-mayor Maynard Jackson opposed the highway while running for mayor
- In March 1973 Governor Jimmy Carter signed a new city charter for Atlanta, including an "Environmental Bill of Rights" that Adele Northrup has authored; nonetheless Carter was believed to support the freeway as late as August 1973.
- In June 1973 the federal DOT rejected the GHD's environmental impact study, citing its underassessment of impact on intown neighborhoods
- In 1975 Governor George Busbee instructed the GHD to remove I-485 from its long term plan – this was considered I-485's definitive death knell.

=== The result ===
The freeway revolt strengthened neighborhood organizations in Atlanta, which to this day exert relatively more influence in city decisions compared to other major US cities.

Portions of the right of way where houses had been razed were used for parks: Sidney Marcus Park in Morningside, John Howell Memorial Park in Virginia Highland, and Freedom Park at the current eastern terminus of Freedom Parkway.

The use of the north-south corridor for a road was a dead concept until GDOT brought it up again in 2010 in the form of a tunnel (see below); the discussion around a road in the east-west corridor was, however, to continue for another two decades.

== Jimmy Carter's "Presidential Parkway" ==
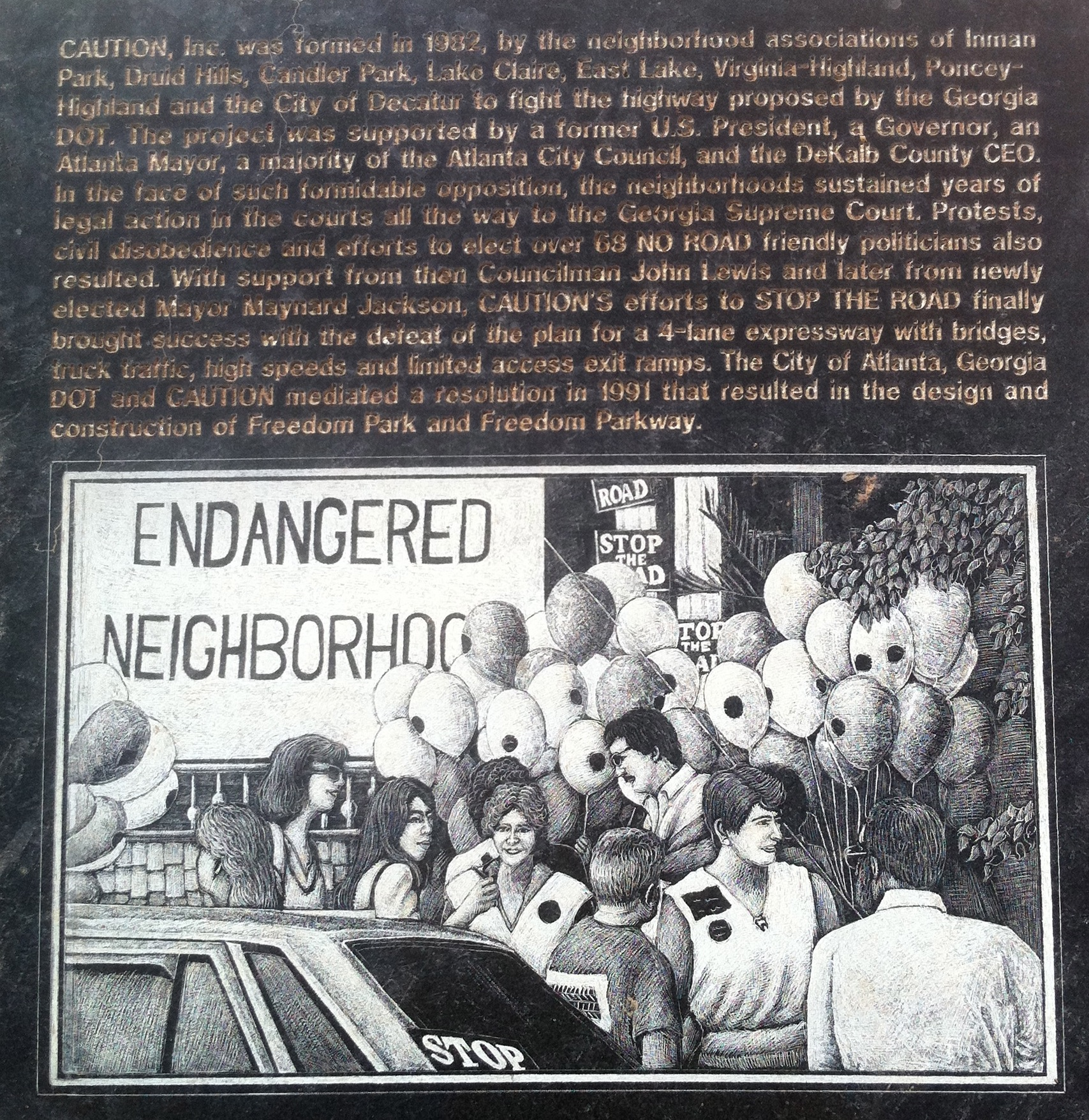
Plaque about CAUTION in Freedom Park just south of Ponce de Leon Ave.

The land that was to become the east-west freeway lay empty through the 1980s as residents fought the construction of any road in the corridor. A "Presidential Parkway" was proposed as a smaller four-lane road to run from Downtown far into Druid Hills (see map).

Citizens of neighborhoods along the corridor formed CAUTION (Citizens Against Unnecessary Thoroughfares in Older Neighborhoods) raised over $800,000 to fight the proposed Presidential Parkway which would have been an elevated multi-lane highway with limited access.

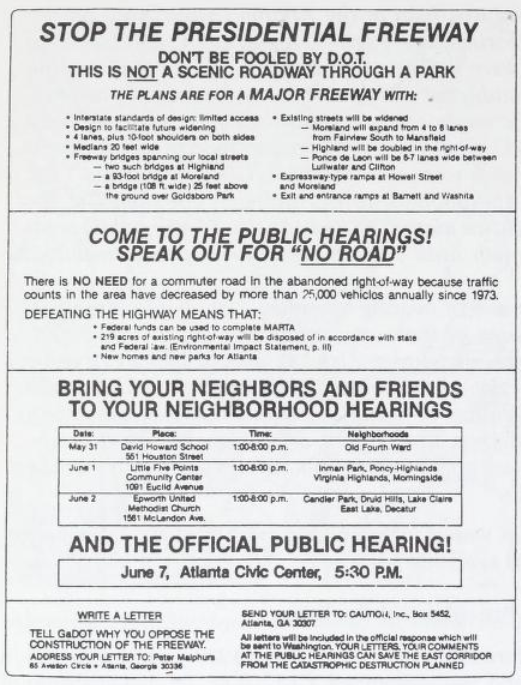
Flyer used by CAUTION in opposition to the Presidential Parkway

In 1981, ex-President Carter revived the idea of a highway along the east-west route to serve his planned presidential library and policy center on Copenhill. Carter originally bought only several acres of land. However the GDOT leased him 29 more acres in exchange for backing GDOT plans for a 2.9 mile east-west expressway, on the condition that if the road were not built, the Center would lose the land, i.e. its parking and gardens. Carter lobbied and won support from Mayor Young, the City Council and Chamber of Commerce. The road would connect the new Carter Center with downtown on the west, and to Druid Hills (and thus access to Emory University) to the east. In 1984, Carter broke ground on the center, and construction resumed on the new "Presidential Parkway".

According to the environmental impact statement, the Presidential Parkway would have used land from four parks, a neighbourhood on the National Register of Historic Places, and a neighbourhood eligible to be on that registry. Their report also noted that the parkway would go over neighbourhoods that represent a broad range of demographics including upper income areas as well as lower income predominantly African American areas.

However, CAUTION lobbied until 1991 to fight the Jimmy Carter-backed Expressway. In the end, only Jimmy Carter and GDOT supported a "Presidential Parkway". CAUTION, Lieutenant Governor Pierre Howard (D-Decatur), Mayor Maynard Jackson, and a majority of councilpersons were opposed, as well as elected officials at the county, state and federal levels. Only the announcement that Atlanta would host the 1996 Olympics broke the stalemate. Court-ordered mediation between representatives of GDOT, the City of Atlanta and CAUTION, reached a mediated settlement to an at-grade, meandering parkway surrounded by parkland. In 1991, compromise forged by Lt. Governor Howard and DOT Commissioner Wayne Shackleford was reached to build the road as it exists today, and to the choice of the name "Freedom Parkway", in theory because it links the Carter Center with the Martin Luther King historic district.

During this time the term "Great Park" was also used to refer to the corridor.

Eventually the four-lane Freedom Parkway was built from Downtown to Copenhill only, ending in a northern stub to Ponce de Leon Avenue near Barnett in Virginia Highland, and an eastern stub to Moreland Avenue in Poncey Highland at the Druid Hills border. Largely due to the efforts of Druid Hills, Inman Park, Candler Park, Lake Claire and Poncey Highland residents, who filed a lawsuit, the right-of-way east of Moreland became a park but without a roadway.

In 1984 Steve Williams started documenting the Presidential Parkway as the construction started, resulting in a photography series and a model built of Freedom Park in the City Hall Atrium after the compromise was reached in 1991. This photography show was supported by a grant by the City of Atlanta Bureau of Cultural Affairs and the Dept of Planning. More grants were awarded to support the work and other events were covered in the park such as Art in Freedom Park in 2005, a summer long arts festival and Naked Freedom, a naked frolic in the park. Other art created for the park was "Decade: 1992 and 2002", a series of photographs, with the original model of the park, sponsored by Don Bender showing the change of the land from 1992 to 2002. Another decade later, the "Decades:1992, 2002, 2012" exhibit went on display throughout Freedom Park to show the further change over those 20 years.

== Eastern part of Lakewood Freeway/Langford Parkway ==
Langford Parkway, originally called the Lakewood Freeway (I-420) – now part of Georgia 166 – was to be built eastwards past its current terminus at the southern end of the Downtown Connector to connect to the north-south I-675 route, and then to meet I-20 near Gresham Park in south DeKalb (map of proposed route).

== 2010 plan for I-675 ==
In 2010 a freeway to link GA-400 at Lindbergh with I-675 at the southeast Perimeter, again appeared on GDOT's list of potential projects, this time in the form whereby the intown portion would be in a 14.6-mile-long, 41-foot-wide tunnel. The Reason Foundation had first advocated for such a tunnel in 2006, proposing that it would be paid as part of larger plan to reduce congestion via tolls. Rep. Pat Gardner held a meeting at Rock Springs Church in Morningside on January 4, 2010 with GDOT and Atlanta Regional Commission (ARC) leaders, Mayor Kasim Reed, city councilmembers and assemblypersons. ARC Chairman Tad Leithead, while still wishing to study the proposal, noted preliminary evidence of a funding gap, very high ($8) tolls and a shortfall in traffic lanes, making it appear that the project "doesn't make any sense". This elicited cheers from the audience. Mayor Reed expressed his total opposition to the tunnel. As of August 2022, this proposal is not on GDOT's Major Mobility Investment Project list.
