= Interstate 485 (Georgia) =

Former proposed highway in Georgia

Interstate 485

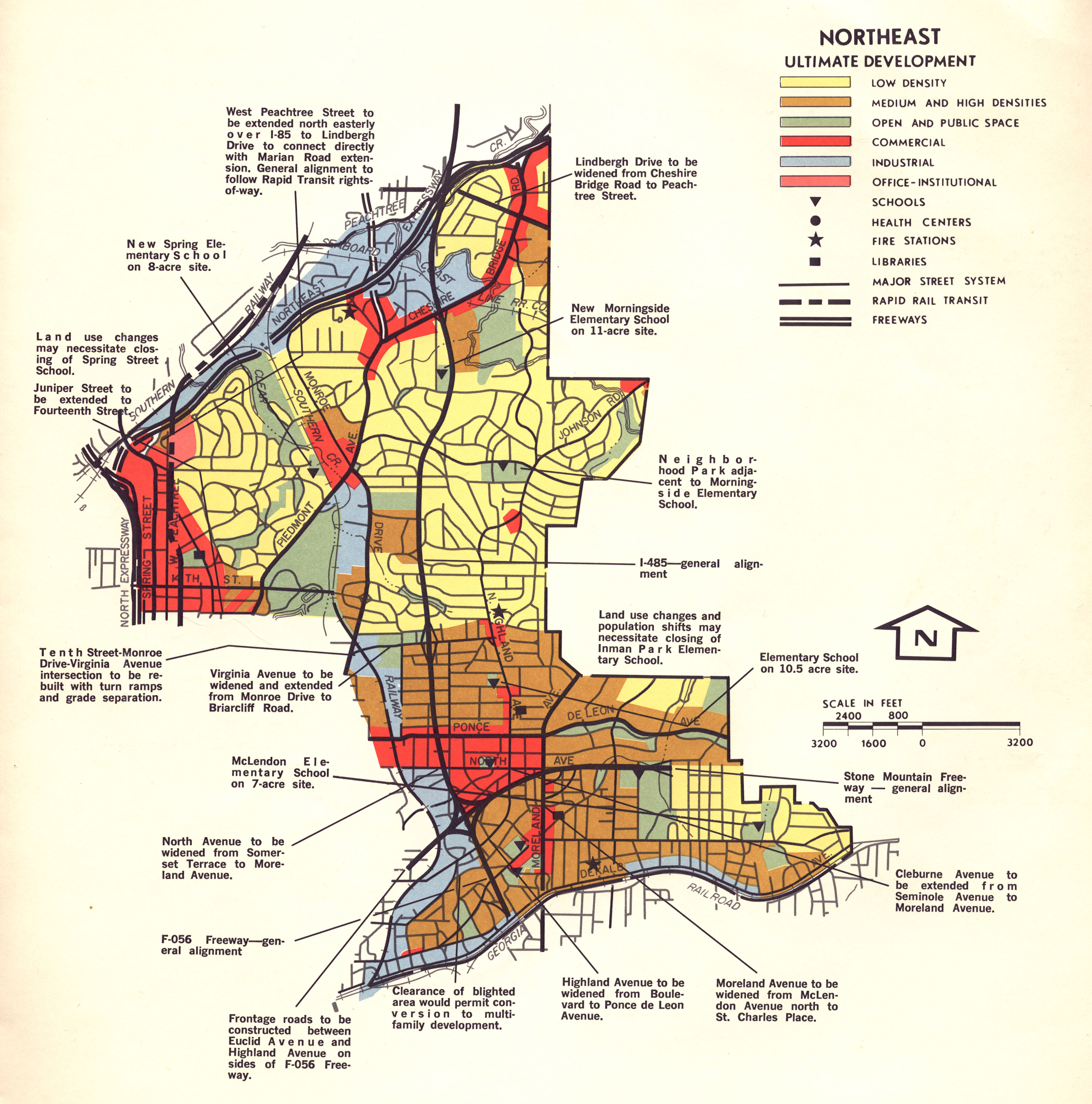
- 1970 map of the proposed route of I-485 through northeast Atlanta

Route information
- Auxiliary route of I-85
- Length: 5.9 mi (9.5 km)
- Existed: 1964–1975
- NHS: Entire route

Location
- Country: United States
- State: Georgia
- Counties: Fulton

Highway system
- Interstate Highway System; Main; Auxiliary; Suffixed; Business; Future; Georgia State Highway System; Interstate; US; State; Special
← I-475	→ SR 500
← SR 409	→ SR 411

Interstate 485 (I-485) is a cancelled auxiliary Interstate Highway that would have traveled eastward and then northward from Downtown Atlanta, in the US state of Georgia.

== Route description ==
The 5.9-mile-long (9.5 km) route would have begun at the Downtown Connector (I-75/I-85) and used the highway that is now State Route 410 (SR 410) east to the interchange with the also-proposed SR 400. There, it would have turned north to end at I-85 near SR 236 (Lindbergh Drive). Each of those freeways would have continued beyond the termini of I-485. SR 410, the Stone Mountain Freeway, would continue east beyond the I-285 perimeter highway, and SR 400 would extend both south and north outside the perimeter. A short piece of I-485/SR 410 was constructed from I-75/I-85 east to Boulevard Northeast.

== History ==
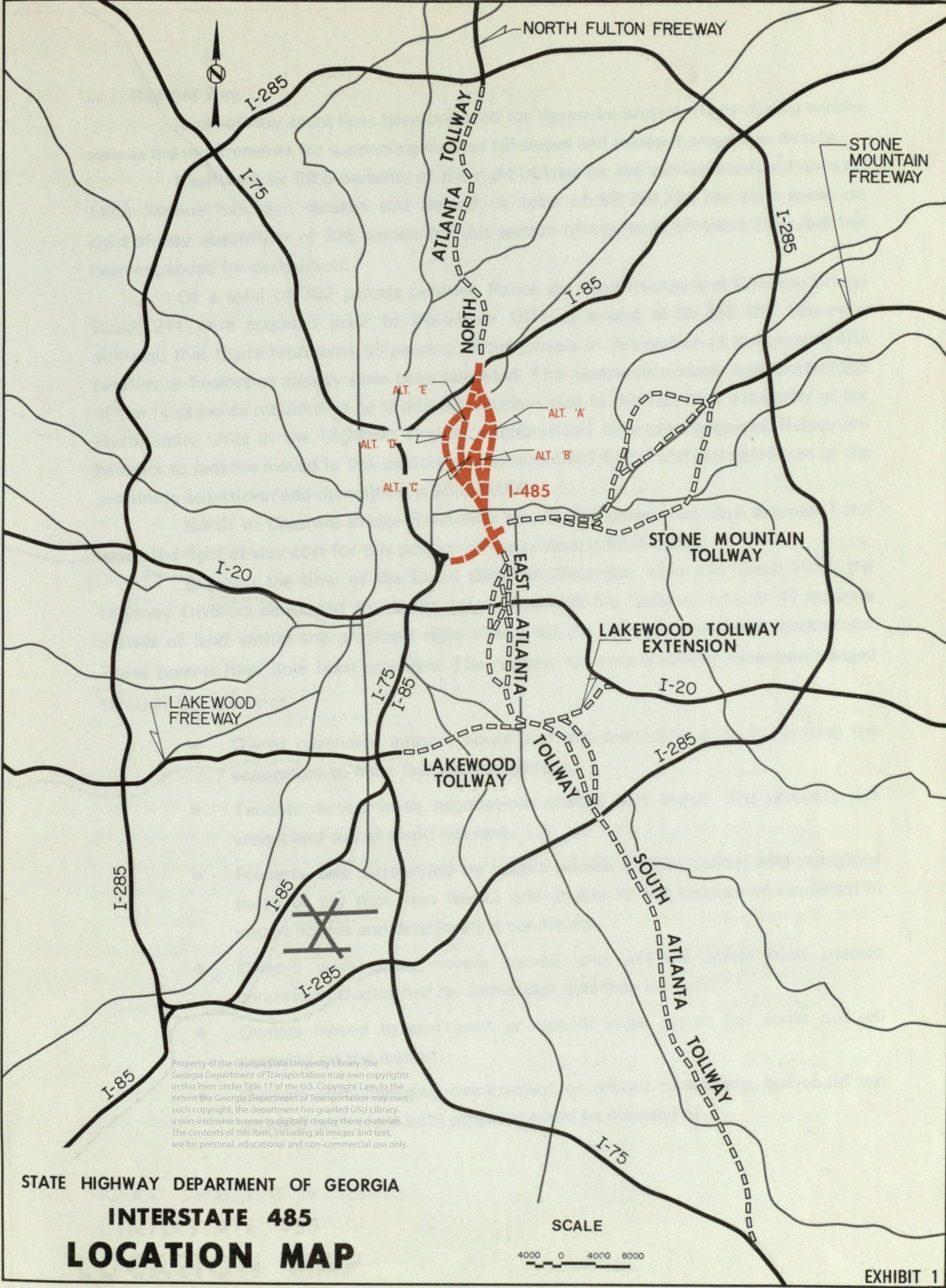
Proposed locations of I-485 and other Atlanta freeways

Activists in the neighborhood of Morningside, along the SR 400 portion of I-485, were the first to fight the road, although opposition surfaced in a number of nearby surrounding neighborhoods. This is the most famous example of the Atlanta freeway revolts. After I-485, and parts of SR 400 and SR 410, was canceled, a portion of the right-of-way of the canceled highway was used to build Freedom Parkway, now part of SR 10. SR 400 north of I-85 was constructed in the early 1990s as a toll road, and the section south of I-285 was constructed in the mid-1980s and designated I-675.

== See also ==
- Transportation in Atlanta
- Interstate 420
