= Max Corput =

American architect

Maximilien van den Corput
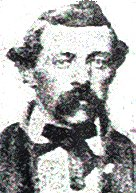
- Max van den Corput
- Born: unknown, possibly between 1824 and 1826 near Brussels, United Kingdom of the Netherlands
- Died: January 16, 1911; Atlanta, Georgia, US
- Burial place: Oakland Cemetery (Atlanta)
- Spouse: Marie Roberts van den Corput
- Military career
- Allegiance: Confederate States of America
- Branch: Confederate States Army
- Service years: 1861–1865
- Rank: Major
- Commands: Cherokee Artillery
- Conflicts: American Civil War: Vicksburg Campaign; Chattanooga campaign; Atlanta campaign; Franklin–Nashville Campaign; Carolinas campaign
- Other work: architect, engineer

Max Corput, fully documented as Maximilien van den Corput (died 1911), was a Belgian-American architect. He designed the second Union Station in Atlanta, Georgia. Van den Corput also served as an officer in the Confederate States Army during the American Civil War.

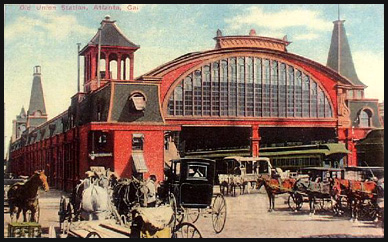
Atlanta's 1871 Union Station

== Name ==
The "van den" (Dutch: from the) is very common in Dutch and Belgian surnames, and references to Corput regarding the civil war usually include his full last name. However, later references including one in the Atlanta Constitution omit the "van den", suggesting that he later went simply by "Corput". His first name has, in additionally to alternative spelling, also been documented as "Maxwell" and occasionally "Joseph John" as middle names.

== Early life and civil war ==
Corput was born near Brussels in Belgium. His exact date of birth is unknown, and has variously been put between 1824 and 1826. In 1848 he belonged to a group of Belgians who emigrated to the United States after the incorporation of Belgium into the United Kingdom of the Netherlands, which caused dissatisfaction among the French-speaking Belgian elite. The group, that included several family members like Corputs younger brother Felix, traveled via New York and Charleston. As the Cherokee Indians had recently been dispossessed of Northwest Georgia, freeing the land for further settlement, the Corputs settled as farmers in the area at Cave Spring.

When the Civil War started in 1861 Corput joined the Confederate States Army. He was commissioned as a Third Lieutenant (1861) in the Cherokee Artillery battery; a unit recruited from the Floyd and Cherokee counties. Several of his relatives joined the unit, too, his brother Felix being the Quartermaster Sergeant. The unit was surrendered during the Siege of Vicksburg, but quickly returned to the field afterwards. By 1864 Corput had been promoted to captain and commanded the battery. At the Battle of Resaca its four 12-pounder Napoleons were captured. Corput himself became a prisoner of war on April 12, 1865 at Salisbury, North Carolina. He was held prisoner at Camp Chase, Ohio until paroled in October.

== Later life ==
After the war Corput settled in Atlanta and founded the architectural firm of Van den Corput and Fay. He had previously been involved in the firm Corput and Bass, where he had begun his career as an engineer, but became known for his architectural designs.

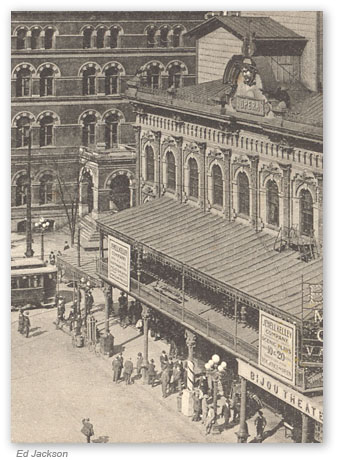
DeGive's Opera House building toward the end of its life, doing business as the Bijou Theater

Corput died on January 16, 1911, in Atlanta and was buried there in Oakland Cemetery. His grave was unmarked until 2014. His wife, and mother of their six children, Marie, was 24 years younger than him and died in 1920. Corput and his battery are the namesakes of the Sons of Confederate Veterans Capt. Max van den Corput's Battery Camp #669.

== Buildings designed ==
- Georgia Railroad Freight Depot (1869), the oldest building in Downtown Atlanta
- DeGive's Opera House (1870–1921)
- Atlanta's second Union Station (1871–1930)
- The Clayton County Courthouse
- The Old Bartow County Courthouse
