= Charles William Hubner =

American writer

Charles William Hubner (January 16, 1835 – 1929) was an American writer. He wrote for newspapers, edited them, taught music, wrote poetry, was a Confederate officer, and wrote books. He was born in Baltimore, Maryland, to a family from Germany. His mother was from Bavaria and he travelled there and in other parts of Europe including Switzerland. He served in the Confederate Army. He contributed to and edited various newspapers.

He married Ida A. Southworth in 1865. She died in 1876. He married Frank Whitney in 1877.

The New York Times called him the poet laureate of the South.

He is buried at Oakland Cemetery along with several family members including his first wife Ida.

S. J. Karina described him as a minor poet unworthy of a revival and wrote that he never adapted to the realism that supplanted his "commonplace" writing style.

== Books ==
- Souvenirs of Luther (1872)
- Wildflowers, a book of poems (1876)
- Cinderella or the Silver Slipper (1879), a lyrical drama
- Modern Communism (1880)
- Poems and Essays (1881)
- Prince and Fairy (1883), a lyrical drama
- Representative Southern Poets (1906)
