= Edward A. Vincent =

American architect

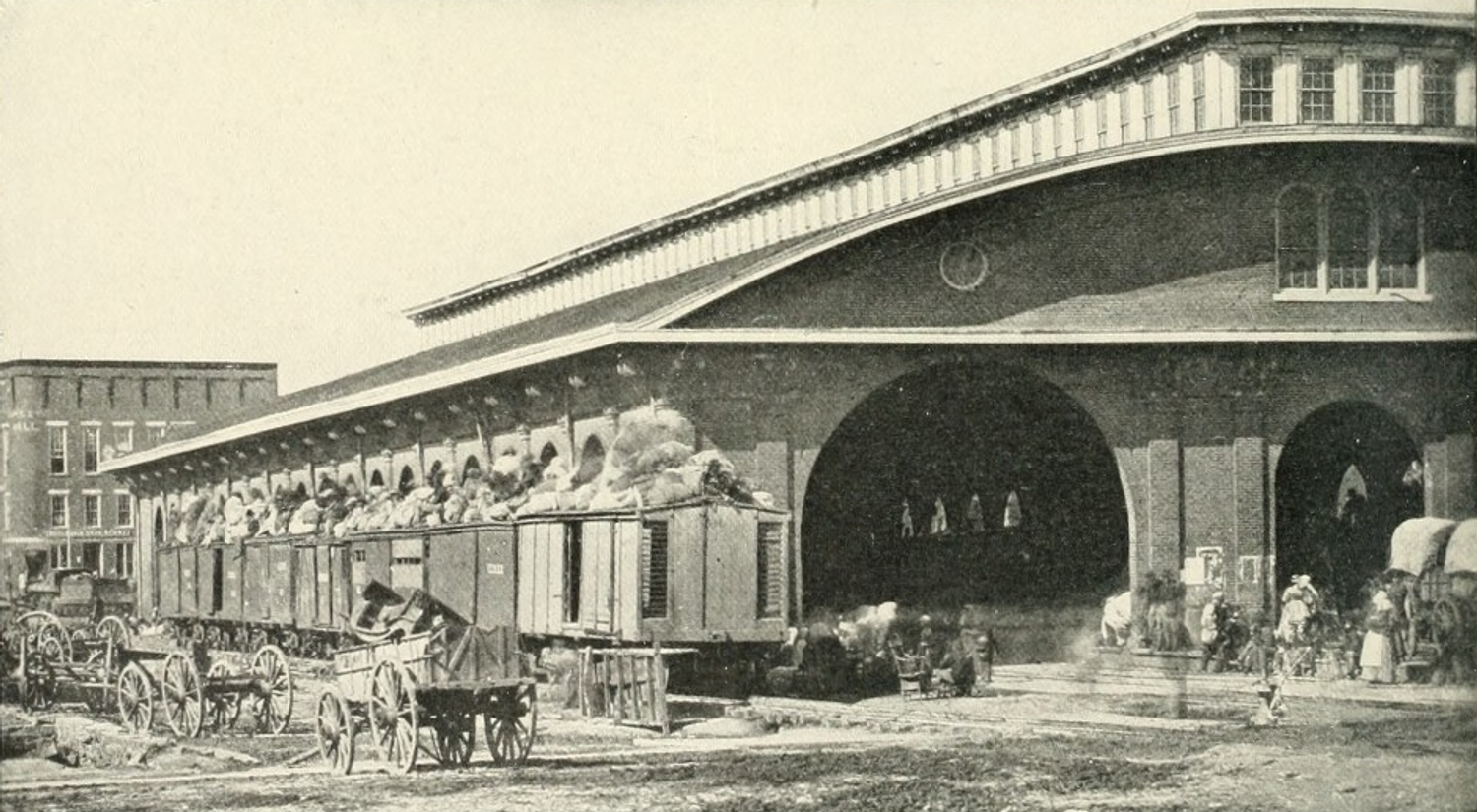
Vincent's railroad depot is shown in this photograph by George Barnard.

Edward Arista Vincent (c. 1825 – November 27, 1856) was an architect, cartographer, and civil engineer, known for his design for Atlanta's antebellum railroad depot Union Station – destroyed by the Union Army during the Battle of Atlanta in the American Civil War.

== Biography ==
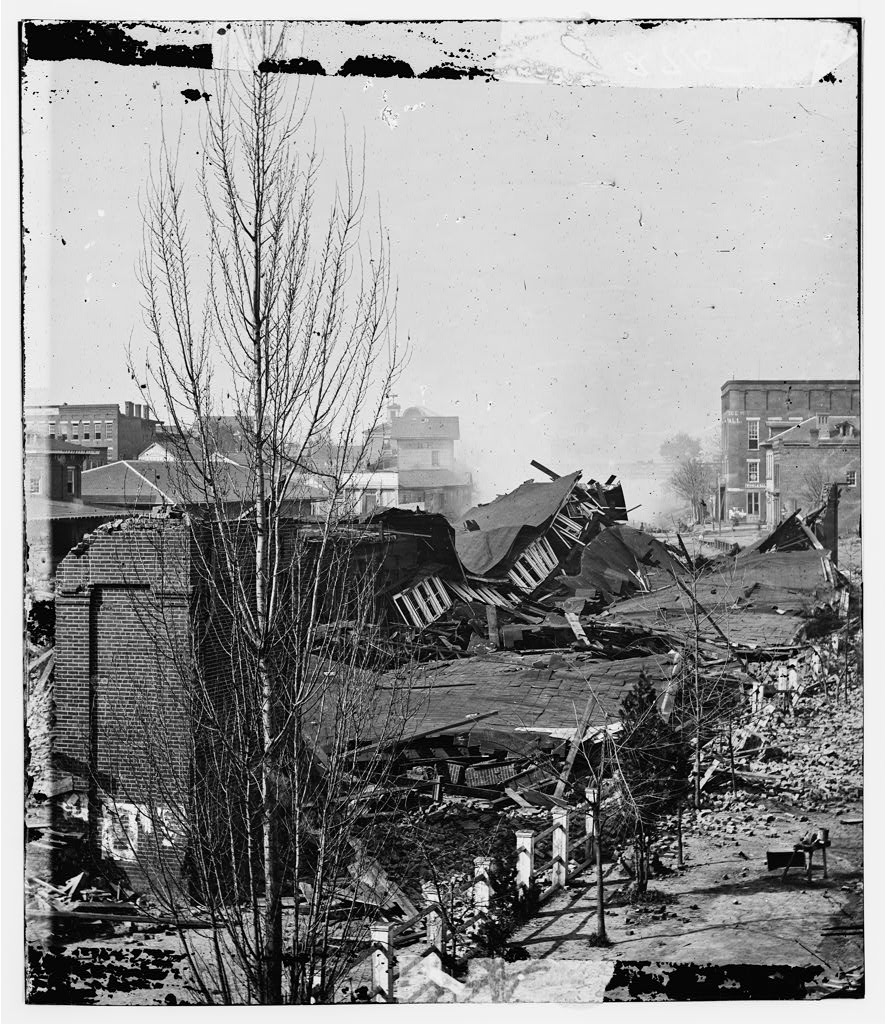
The depot was demolished by Federal troops as they were leaving Atlanta on Sherman's March to the Sea.

Vincent was probably born in London, immigrating to the United States in 1849. Living first in New York City, he moved to Savannah, Georgia, in 1851. He became a U.S. citizen in 1852. That year he launched himself into the public eye, advertising his services as a civil engineer and architect in Savannah, Macon, and Augusta newspapers. According to Caldwell, he was more likely an engineer rather than an architect. He had offices in Macon, Augusta, and Atlanta. Vincent fell suddenly ill in November 1856 and died twelve days later. He was about thirty years old. His body was interred in Oakland Cemetery in Atlanta.

== Architecture ==
Vincent was hired by the Western and Atlantic Railroad in 1852 to design a modern passenger depot in Atlanta. It was built by Henry Franklin Jeffries and was completed in April 1853. It was 300 feet long, 100 feet wide, and included a ticket office, baggage storage rooms, waiting rooms, and a food stand. According to Caldwell, "no structure could have spoken more eloquently for the new city than this purely utilitarian" building.

In 1864, the depot was demolished by Federal troops under the command of General Sherman during the occupation of Atlanta. Neither Vincent nor Jeffries lived to witness the depot's destruction. Although Vincent advertised himself widely as an architect, no other examples of his work are currently known.

A scaled-down copy of Vincent's Depot has been recreated in Atlanta's Stone Mountain Park.

== Cartography ==
Vincent's Subdivision Map of the City of Atlanta, 1853.

Vincent's first and most ambitious cartographic project was his 1853 city map of Savannah. Measuring fifty-one inches wide and fifty inches tall, the detailed map included outlines of all structures in the city, both public and private. Brick and wood buildings were identified by different fill patterns. It was delivered to the Savannah city council by March 24, 1853.

On February 16, 1853, the Atlanta city council approved Vincent's proposal to produce a map of that city. It was completed by November 18, 1853, because the city council resolved that copies should be sent to the mayors of Georgia's other major cities.

Following the completion of his Atlanta map, the city of Macon hired Vincent to survey the city, produce a map, and direct the construction of a new sewer system. The city council challenged Vincent's survey methods and required that the city survey be re-staked. The city paid Vincent for fifty copies of his map, but required that a disclaimer be written on each one indemnifying the city from any legal challenge based on errors in the map.

== See also ==
- Atlanta Union Station (1853)

== Bibliography ==
- Vincent, Edward A. 1852. "Atlanta Union Depot" [architectural drawing]. Atlanta History Center.
- Vincent, Edward A. 1853. Vincent's Subdivision Map of the City of Atlanta. Map Collections, American Memory, Library of Congress.
- Vincent, Edward A. 1853. Vincent's Subdivision Map of the City of Savannah. Cartographic and Architectural Division, National Archives.
- Vincent, Edward A. 1854. Vincent's New Map of the City of Macon. Washington Memorial Library, Macon, Georgia.
