= Georgia Railroad Freight Depot =

Oldest Building in downtown Atlanta

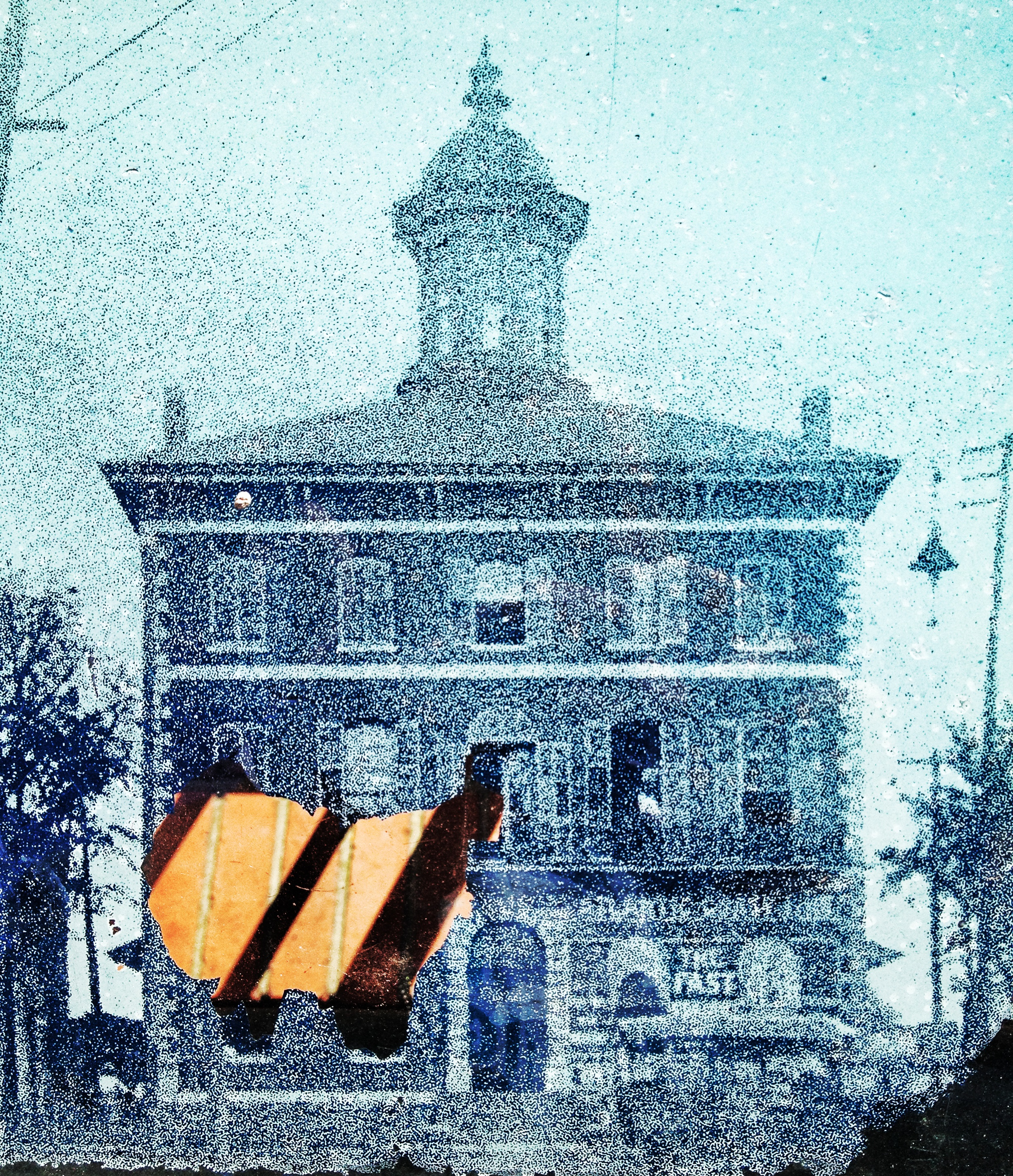
- Plaque in front of depot shows building when it had the upper floors and cupola.
- Interactive map of the Georgia Railroad Freight Depot area

General information
- Location: 65 Martin Luther King, Jr. Drive SE, Downtown Atlanta, US
- Coordinates: 33.751683°N 84.38875°W
- Completed: 1869; 157 years ago
- Renovated: 1981; 45 years ago
- Owner: Georgia Building Center

Design and construction
- Architect: Max Corput
- Architecture firm: Corput and Bass

Other information
- Seating capacity: 800 (seated), 1300 (standing)

Website
- Georgia Building Center

The Georgia Railroad Freight Depot (1869) is the oldest building in downtown Atlanta.

It is located on the east side of Central Avenue, bordered by the MARTA and freight railroad lines on its north side. It anchors the north side of Steve Polk Plaza, which contains the old World of Coca-Cola building at its south side and an entrance to Underground Atlanta, via a tunnel under Central Avenue, on its west side.

The depot was completed in 1869. The architects were (Max) Corput and Bass. It was the main freight depot for the Georgia Railroad and Banking Company.

A fire in 1935 destroyed the upper floors and the cupola.

In 1981 the building was renovated to accommodate events. It can accommodate 800 seated guests or 1300 standing.
