= Underground Atlanta =

Mixed-use in Atlanta, Georgia, U.S.

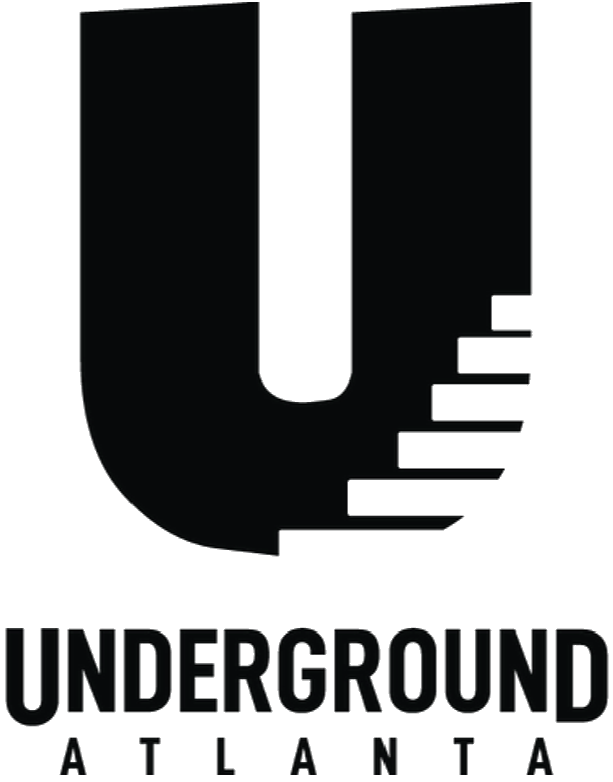

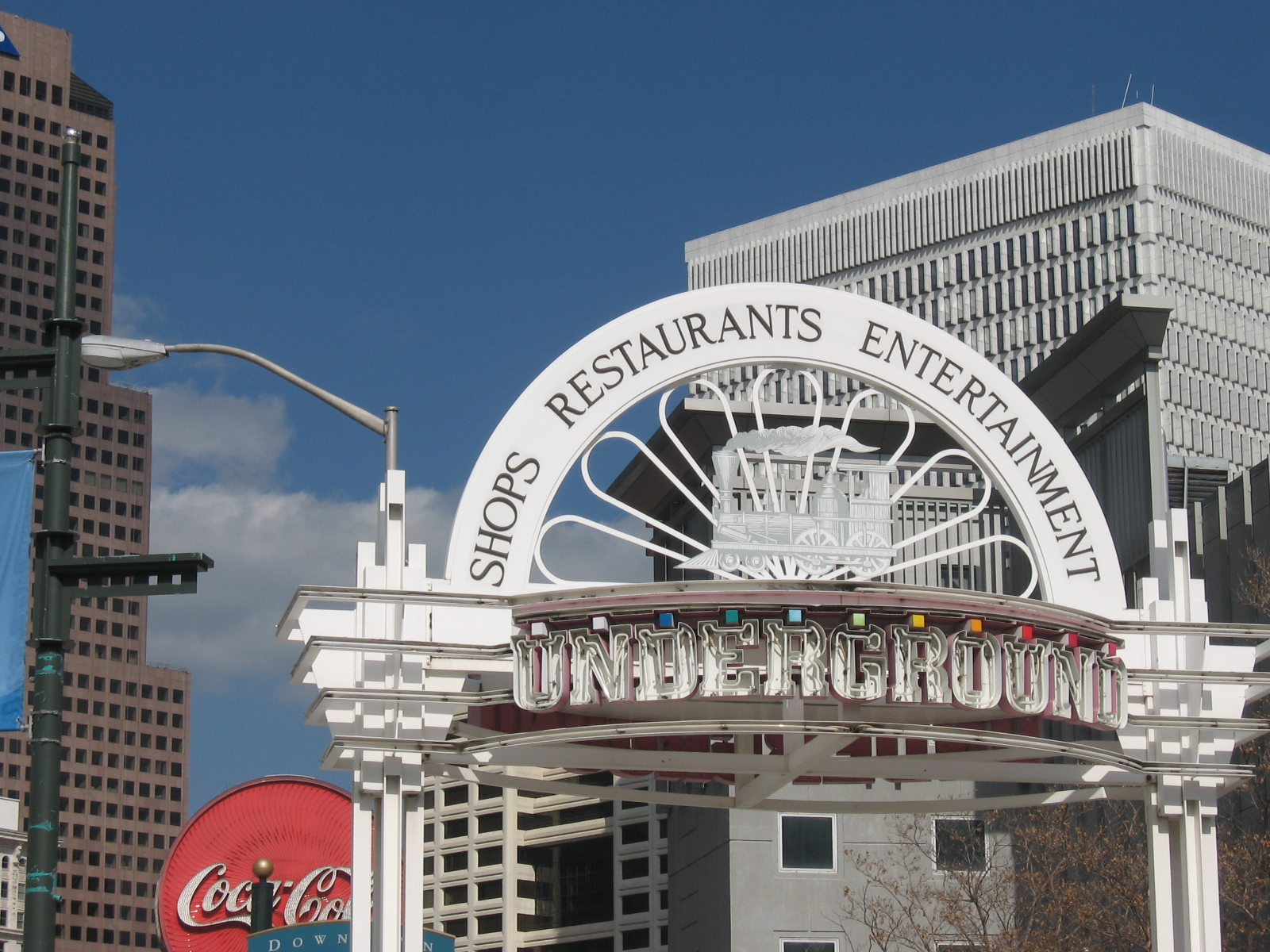
- Entrance to Underground Atlanta, near the corner of Peachtree and Wall
- Coordinates: 33.75274°N 84.39008°W
- Opened: April 8, 1969; 57 years ago (as entertainment district); June 15, 1989; 37 years ago (as shopping mall)
- Closed: 1980; 46 years ago (entertainment district); 2016–August 13, 2017; 9 years ago (shopping mall/lower level)
- Developer: Steven H. Fuller Jr. and Jack R. Patterson (entertainment district); The American City Corporation (shopping mall); WRS Inc. Real Estate Investments (mixed-use complex)
- Manager: Lalani Ventures
- Owner: Billionaires Funding Group
- Num. of stores: 140 (at peak)
- Floors: 3
- Public transit: Five Points MARTA station
- Website: undergroundatl.com
- Underground Atlanta Historic District
- U.S. National Register of Historic Places
- U.S. Historic district
- NRHP reference No.: 80001077
- Added to NRHP: July 24, 1980
- Building details

General information
- Status: Undergoing redevelopment
- Type: Entertainment district (1969–1989); Festival marketplace (1989–2017); Mixed-use (2017–present)

Underground Atlanta is a shopping and entertainment district in the Five Points neighborhood of downtown Atlanta, Georgia, United States, near the Five Points MARTA station. It is currently undergoing redevelopment into a mixed-use complex. First opened in 1969, it takes advantage of the viaducts built over the city's many railroad tracks to accommodate later automobile traffic.

== Geography and location ==
Selected locations near Underground Atlanta
- Points of interest
- Parks and open spaces
- Transit
1 Atlanta Union Station (1930)
2 Atlanta Constitution building (abandoned)
3 Five Points station
4 Peachtree Fountains Plaza
5 "Twin Bridges" Viaduct (at Alabama & Pryor)
6 Steve Polk Plaza
7 Georgia Railroad Freight Depot
8 Georgia State Capitol

Underground Atlanta is centered on the historical railroad gulch, which follows the railroad tracks approximately northwest to southeast, parallel to Alabama Street, between Forsyth Street and Central Avenue. In the 1979 nomination form to establish the Underground Atlanta Historic District for listing on the National Register of Historic Places, the cited area is bounded by the modern-day Alabama Street, Central Avenue, Peachtree Street (formerly Whitehall), and Martin Luther King Jr. Drive; a handwritten note extends it to a four-block area bounded by Wall St SW (on the northeast), Central Ave SW (on the southeast), Martin Luther King Jr. Dr SW (on the southwest) and Peachtree St (on the northwest).

- The north block (Block 1 of the 2017 redevelopment project) is occupied by Peachtree Fountains Plaza and has an area of 1.9 acres (0.77 ha), bounded by Peachtree, Alabama, Pryor, and Wall.
- The east block (Block 2 of the 2017 redevelopment project) is bounded by Pryor, Alabama, Central, and Wall.
- The south block (Block 3 of the 2017 redevelopment project) is bounded by Pryor, Alabama, Central, and MLK. The west block (Block 4 of the 2017 redevelopment project, although Block 4 properly refers to the eastern half of this block) is bounded by Peachtree, Alabama, Pryor, and MLK.

The four-block site is bisected by Pryor St SW (running from the northeast to the southwest side) and Alabama St (running northwest to southeast). Pryor and Alabama each have two levels; each level has two main halls, which are called Upper and Lower Alabama and Pryor Streets.

== History ==
=== Background ===
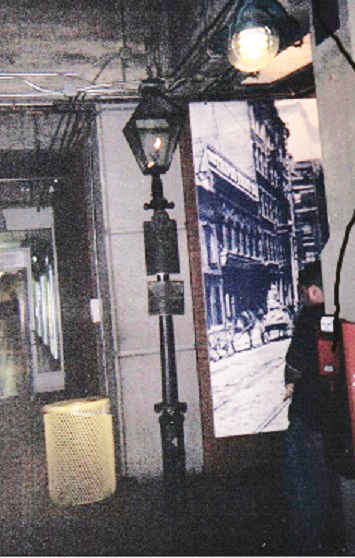
This historic gas lamp, located in the Underground, was one of 50 erected by the Atlanta Gas Light Company in 1856. It was shelled by Union artillery prior to the Battle of Atlanta of the American Civil War. There are two bronze plaques mounted on it which commemorate Solomon (Sam) Luckie, one of 40 free blacks who died from the wounds that he received from the shell that struck the lamp. Also commemorated on the plaques are the Confederacy, the Battle of East Atlanta, and one of the local men who fought in that battle.

The buildings comprising Underground Atlanta were constructed during the city's post-Civil War Reconstruction Era boom, between 1866 and 1871, when the city's population doubled from 11,000 to 22,000 residents. In 1869, the Georgia Railroad Freight Depot was completed to replace the one destroyed by Sherman's troops in 1864. The Georgia Railroad depot, which stands at the entrance of Underground Atlanta, remains the oldest building in downtown Atlanta. Although the depot was originally three stories tall, the second and third story were destroyed by fire in 1935. Besides the train station, the bustling district included hotels, banks, law offices, and saloons. An electric streetcar was installed in 1889 to points South, and by 1900 the depot was serving 100 trains per day with direct service between Atlanta and New York City; Cincinnati, Ohio; Chattanooga, Tennessee; Knoxville, Tennessee; Augusta, Georgia; Macon, Georgia; and Columbus, Georgia.

By 1910, the intense railroad activity and development in the area led to the erection of several iron bridges to accommodate pedestrian and automotive traffic across the railroad tracks. Atlanta architect Haralson Bleckley proposed to cover over the tracks entirely with a ferroconcrete platform on viaducts in 1909; as part of the contemporary City Beautiful trend, the platform would be used for boulevards and public plazas. Although Bleckley's plan was never realized, Plaza Park (in the north block of the four-block Underground Atlanta district) was eventually built in 1948 and later demolished and rebuilt as Peachtree Fountains Plaza.

In 1928, the "twin bridges" viaduct was completed, raising the street level of Pryor, Central, Wall, and Alabama by one and a half stories, and a five-block area was completely covered up. This submerged the original street levels of Pryor, Alabama, Ponder's Alley, and Kenny's Alley, with access to the original street levels provided from Old Loyd Street. During the construction of the "twin viaducts", merchants moved their operations to the second floor of their buildings, and turned the original ground floors' storefronts into basements for storage and service.

Down in Atlanta GA
Underneath the viaduct every day
Drinking corn and hollerin' hoo-ray
Pianos playin' till the break of day

— Bessie Smith, "Preachin' the Blues" (1927)

Given that this occurred during Prohibition, and the fact that these "basements" were relatively obscured from the city above, some of the basements became sites for speakeasys and juke joints, with music and illegal drinking a common occurrence. One of the first mentions of the area is in the opening lines of Bessie Smith's 1927 song "Preachin' The Blues" which documents its importance as an entertainment district.

For the next forty years, as Atlanta continued to grow at street level, the 12-acre (49,000 m^{2}) underground area was effectively abandoned and forgotten, though frequented by the homeless.

=== Entertainment district ===
In the 1960s, the original storefronts were rediscovered and many architectural features from a century earlier had survived intact including decorative brickwork, granite archways, ornate marble, cast-iron pilasters, hand-carved wooden posts, and gas street lamps. Two Georgia Tech graduates, Steven H. Fuller Jr. and Jack R. Patterson, began to plan a private development there to restore and reopen "the city beneath the city" as a retail and entertainment district. Underground Atlanta, Inc. was incorporated May 2, 1967, and began acquiring options to lease buildings under Central Ave, Pryor, Whitehall, Hunter, Alabama, and Wall Street viaducts. Fuller and Paterson purchased all the corporation's stock in October 1967 and construction began in November 1968.

A constitutional amendment was passed in Georgia naming the area a state historic site. The renovation left the original facades mainly intact and was concentrated on the spaces along Alabama, Pryor, and Kenny's Alley.

Postcard showing Underground Atlanta in the 1970s, featuring Streetcar 924, formerly of New Orleans

The Underground Atlanta corporation spent $10 million on redeveloping the historic area into an entertainment district. On April 8, 1969, "Underground Atlanta" officially opened with new restaurants, bars, nightclubs, and music venues installed in the old individual storefronts. At the time, Fulton County was the only county in the state of Georgia that permitted mixed alcoholic beverages to be served, provided that adults met a dress code in places that served them. As a result, Underground Atlanta quickly became the center of downtown Atlanta nightlife.

Popular spots in Underground Atlanta included Dante's Down the Hatch, Scarlett O'Hara, The Blarney Stone, The Rustler's Den, The Pumphouse, The Front Page, The Bank Note, and Muhlenbrink's Saloon, where Atlanta's Piano Red, under the name Dr. Feelgood and the Interns, played from 1969 to 1979. Other attractions included a souvenir shop owned by governor Lester Maddox and a wax museum. With the old-style architecture lending considerable charm to the district, Underground Atlanta soon became Atlanta's best-known tourist attraction, rivaling Bourbon Street in New Orleans. By 1972, its most profitable year, Underground had 3.5 million visitors and $17 million in sales. In 1973, there were 65 businesses employing 1,000. At its peak, there were more than 80 restaurants, clubs, boutiques, and shops in the Underground Atlanta district.

The heyday of Underground Atlanta lasted for only half a decade. The legal drinking age in Georgia was lowered from 21 to 18 in 1972. When neighboring DeKalb County relaxed their restrictions on alcohol consumption in the early 1970s, new bars sprouted up in other parts of the city, generating competition. The dress code restrictions were dropped and fights began to break out. Crime became uncontrollable and the area was considered dangerous. In addition, the construction of the MARTA East Line beginning in 1975 tore out approximately one third of the Underground blocks and eliminated parking.

In 1975, The New York Times noted that winter traffic to the complex was sparse and threatened the continued existence of the district; Underground Atlanta Inc. offered 26,000 shares of stock to the city of Atlanta, and proposed to fence off the district, converting the public streets into public parkland and offering a 25-cent admission charge. By 1976, sales were down to just 40% of 1973 results.

Underground [Atlanta] was never planned ... anyone who was there with an idea was welcomed. We built it, then just let it drift.

— Mayor Andrew Young, quoted in 1991 article

The Underground Atlanta Historic District was added to the National Register of Historic Places on July 24, 1980, the same year that Underground Atlanta was closed; just 26 businesses remained. Although they struggled to stay open, the area was once again abandoned by February 1982. Dante Stephensen, the proprietor of Dante's Down the Hatch, was the last to leave the Underground.

=== Shopping mall ===
==== Pre-construction and development ====
Underground sat mostly dormant for most of the 1980s. Vagrants occupied several of the historic buildings, some of which were consequently destroyed by fires. In 1982, newly elected mayor Andrew Young vowed to reopen Underground as part of his plan to resuscitate downtown Atlanta, starting with authorizing a $400,000 study conducted by the American City Corporation (a subsidiary of The Rouse Company, who had redeveloped and operated other "festival marketplace" projects around the United States such as Faneuil Hall Marketplace in Boston, Harborplace in Baltimore, and Bayside Marketplace in Miami); the resulting study advocated a complete redevelopment of Underground and the five blocks surrounding it. Underground Festival Development, Inc. (UFD) was formed in January 1985 to supervise the proposed redevelopment, and Mayor Young signed an agreement with UFD in July of that year. UFD began negotiating with Rouse to manage the site once complete. However, the development was put on hold in December 1985 when the Georgia Supreme Court ruled the proposal, which included a municipal bond issue, first required approval by Fulton County citizens.

Mindful of the security issues (real and perceived) that contributed to the first closure of Underground in 1980, UFD began to plan entrances, exits, and lighting to emphasize safety and Rouse assembled a security force of 30. During this time, some of the clubs that had been destroyed by the MARTA construction eventually won a claim for damages from federal mass transit authorities and used the money to help revitalize the area a second time.

The restructured $85 million bond issue was approved by the Georgia Supreme Court by July 1986, and reconstruction of Underground commenced. The Rouse Company announced it was ready to sign up tenants in March 1987; in all, the renovation cost $142 million. The city of Atlanta contributed $123 million of that, including the $85 million bond revenue, with the remainder from sales taxes and federal sources. On June 15, 1989, during heavy thunderstorms, Underground Atlanta re-opened as more of a modern shopping mall than an entertainment district; the revamped Underground had double the retail space of the old entertainment district, with 225,000 ft^{2} (20,900 m^{2}). Its 140 tenants included the retail outlets Sam Goody and Olivia Newton-John's Koala Blue boutique, as well as a reopened Dante's Down the Hatch in the Kenny's Alley section. Kenny's Alley was the designated entertainment area at the modern (post-1928) street level, with 100,000 ft^{2} (9,300 m^{2}) available for dining and clubs. In total, the redevelopment project spanned an area of six city blocks, approximately 12 acres (4.9 ha), with parking for 1,200 vehicles. The redevelopment of Underground Atlanta received an award for Excellence in Urban Design from the American Institute of Architects in 1990.

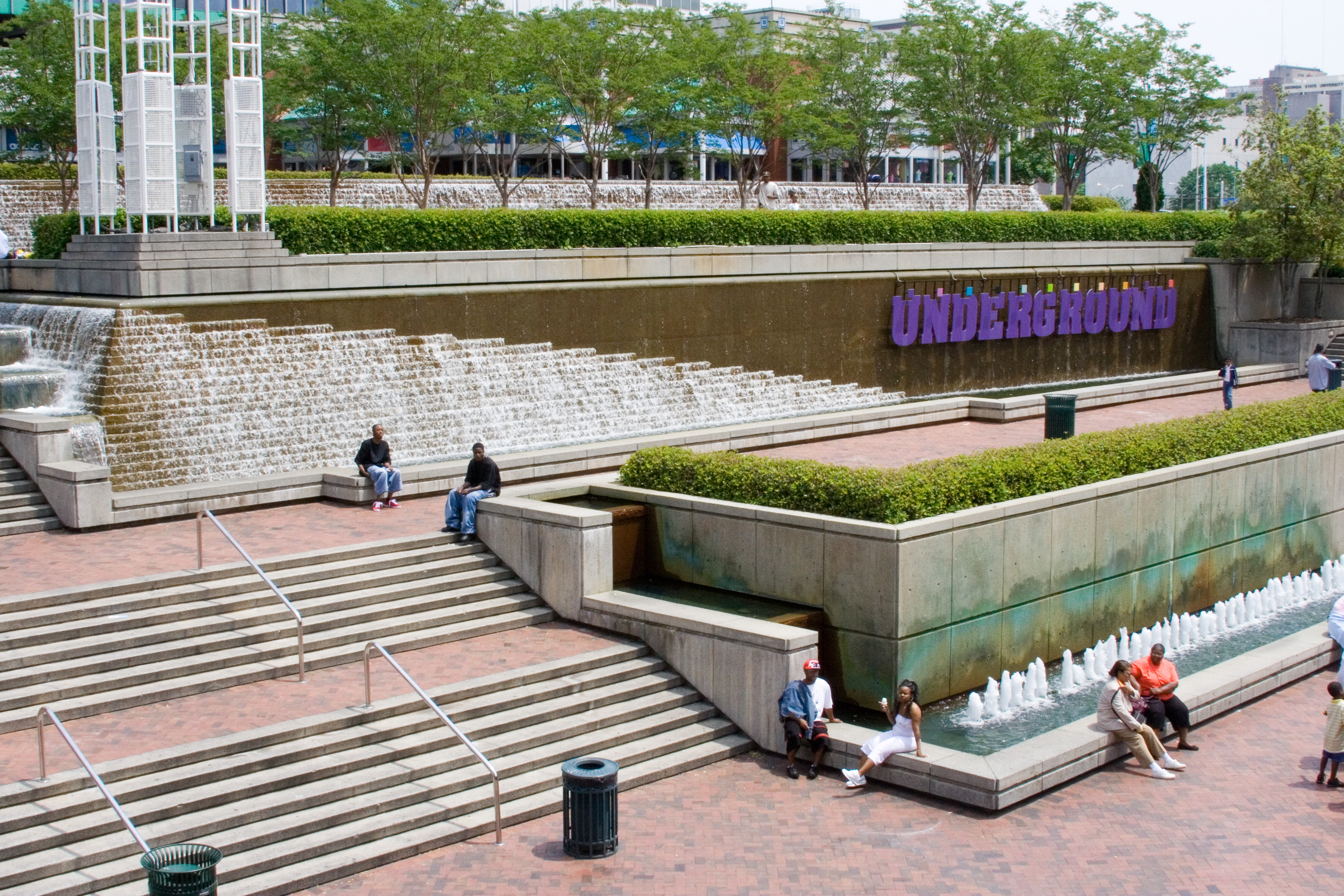
Peachtree Fountains Plaza; steps lead down to Lower Alabama.

The renovation also removed Plaza Park, which had been built in the late 1940s, and replaced it with Peachtree Fountains Plaza. Plaza Park had been the site of the city's last remaining peach tree on its namesake Peachtree Street, but 20 non-fruit-bearing trees were donated by the Georgia Peach Commission to be planted in nearby Woodruff Park. At its peak, the mall housed 140 tenants.

=== After reopening ===
Although the historic buildings and architecture remained a major draw, some critics felt that the now-sanitized district had lost its original charm and lively atmosphere; Jeff Kunerth wrote the new Underground was "a new heart [of Atlanta] with the soul of Disney World's Main Street" in the Orlando Sentinel.

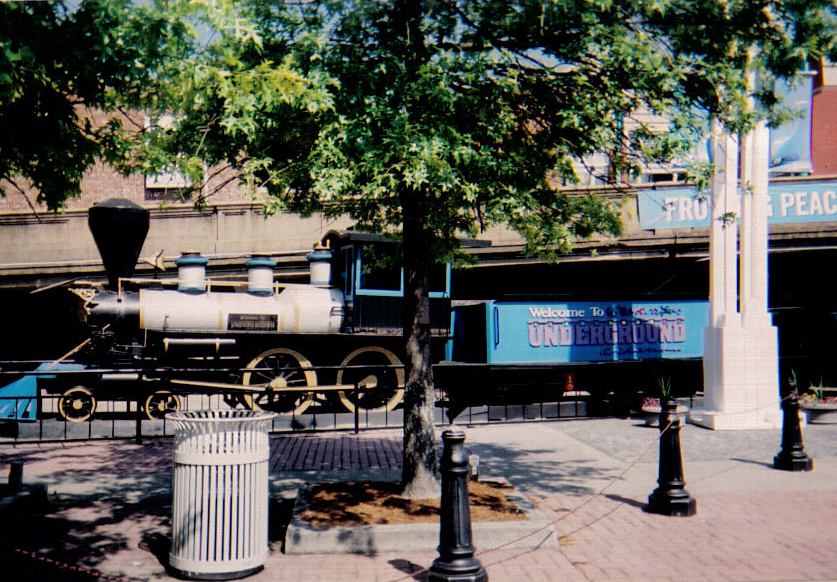
Six Gun Territory No. 4, a 4-4-0 steam locomotive on display at the entrance of the revamped Underground. This locomotive was sold to the Kirby Family Farm in 2017.

First-year sales results were encouraging, with a total of $75 million (exceeding the projection by $5 million) and 13 million visitors, of which 7.8 million were from the Atlanta metropolitan area. The number of visitors from outside the area was the only disappointment. Developers envisioned Underground Atlanta would become the third major tourist attraction for Atlanta, including Stone Mountain Park and Six Flags Over Georgia. The New Georgia Railroad had operated a vintage train excursion from its depot (the former Pullman Yard) near Underground Atlanta to Stone Mountain Park starting in 1986; the excursion train service was discontinued in 1993.

In August 1990, the World of Coca-Cola, a museum chronicling the history of The Coca-Cola Company and its products, opened adjacent to Underground Atlanta, bringing a further influx of tourists to the area. The museum would later relocate to the re-developed Pemberton Place near the Georgia Aquarium. In September 1990, International Olympic Committee President Juan Antonio Samaranch announced that Atlanta had been awarded the 1996 Summer Olympic games; citizens had gathered at Kenny's Alley to watch the announcement live on video monitors.

But on April 30, 1992, in the wake of the Rodney King trial verdict, the area was severely damaged by protesters and gangs, leading to the imposition of a curfew. A new marketing campaign which stated "The Fun in Town is Underground" was designed to help its public image. Although the area saw significant attendance during the 1996 Olympics, Underground Atlanta and the Five Points station were evacuated following the bombing at nearby Centennial Olympic Park when an abandoned bag was found, and Underground still ended the year $6.5 million in debt.

=== Decline and closure ===
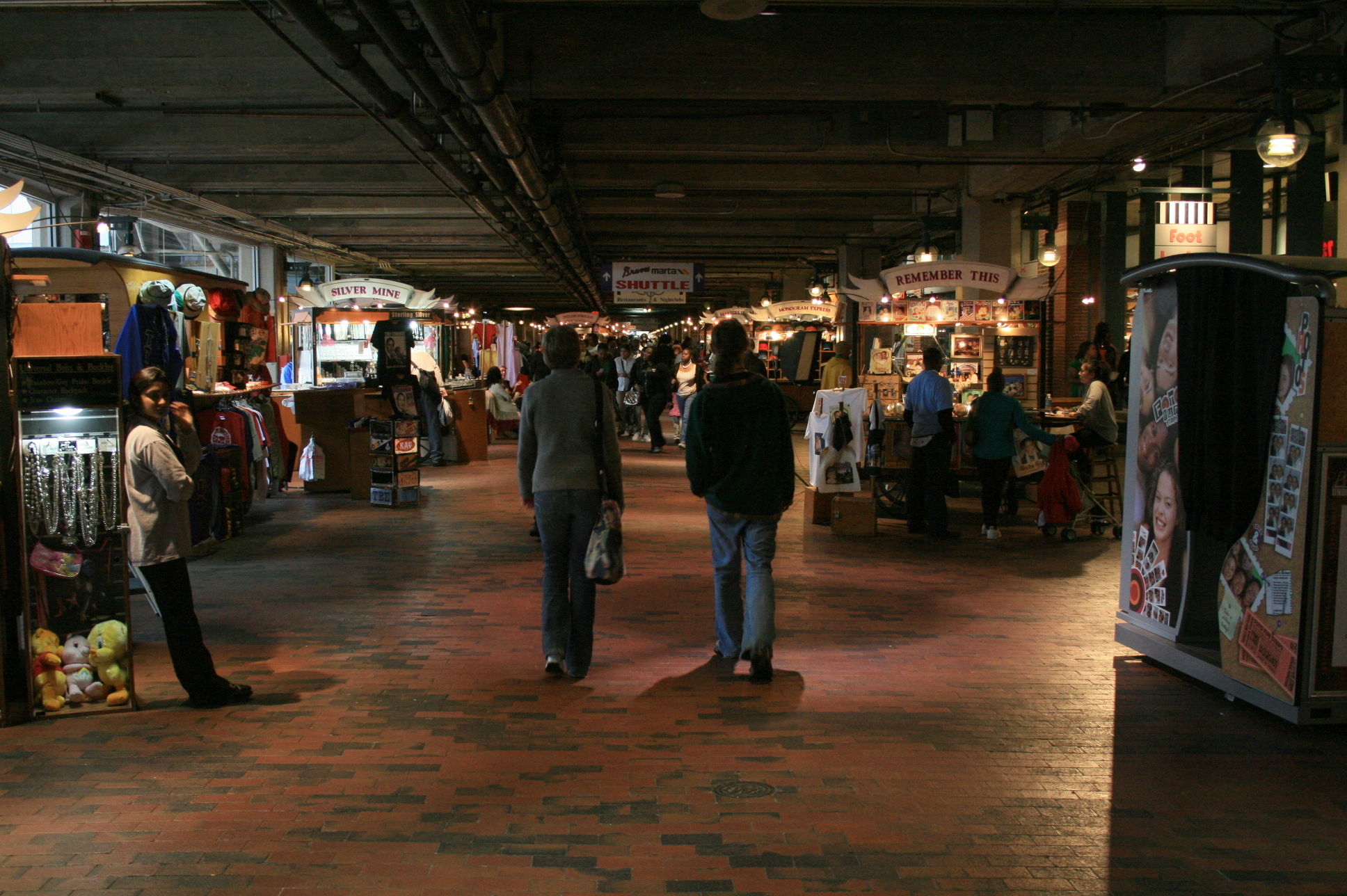
Merchants lining the halls of Lower Alabama at Underground Atlanta in March 2008

Underground Atlanta was host to retail stores, restaurants, and several nightclubs and bars in Kenny's Alley and street battle dancing in the late 1990s. In 2004, in an effort to keep Underground Atlanta from closing a second time, the city passed an ordinance allowing bars in the complex to remain open and serve drinks until 4:00 a.m. – a last call 90 minutes later than the rest of the city had recently been restricted to. Patrons were also permitted to take their open alcoholic drinks from bar to bar. Despite this, Underground Atlanta struggled to attract consistent and diverse patronage. Eventually, Underground Atlanta was closed for a second time in 2016.

=== Mixed-use renovation ===
On December 17, 2014, an announcement was made by Atlanta's then mayor, Kasim Reed, that the city of Atlanta was under contract to sell Underground Atlanta to developer WRS Inc. The developer plans to turn Underground Atlanta into a mixed-use development with more retail options and above ground apartments, with total investments of $150–$200 million. The sale was completed in March 2017, and the lower level closed to the public on August 13, 2017. WRS was better known for developing suburban strip malls, and Atlanta Journal-Constitution columnist Bill Torpy was skeptical about their prospects, calling them "an odd fit for the job". By January 2020, the renovation had borne few visible signs of change.

On November 28, 2020, Underground Atlanta was sold to Shaneel Lalani, the CEO of Norcross-based Billionaires Funding Group (BFG), a private investment firm. Lalani assembled a team of experts to suggest new directions for renovating the site; recommendations included mixed-use development with multifamily residences, expanded retail and dining options, and reopening outdoor spaces. By 2021, BFG had hired Kimley-Horn and HGOR to create a master plan for the site, and several leases were announced in 2022.
