= Jasper Newton Smith =

American businessman

- Born: December 29, 1833; Walton County, Georgia, United States
- Died: August 16, 1918 (aged 84); Atlanta, Georgia, United States
- Resting place: Oakland Cemetery (Atlanta)
- Other names: Uncle Jack "Atlanta's quaintest character"
- Spouse(s): Rebecca Hawk (married 1856–1870); Fanny Jackson (married 1875–1901)

Jasper Newton "Jack" Smith (December 29, 1833 – August 16, 1918) was an American businessman from Georgia. Born in Walton County, he moved to Atlanta following the Civil War where he became a successful and eccentric businessman.

== Early life and career ==
Jasper Newton Smith was born in Walton County, Georgia, on December 29, 1833, to William Smith and Elizabeth (Brady) Smith. Smith had nine brothers and two sisters. As a child, Jack developed a phobia of neckties due to an accidental near-strangulation, and as an adult he refused to ever wear one. He attended the public county school as a child and worked at his family's farm. At the start of the Civil War, Jack joined the Tenth Georgia Cavalry, but resigned in December 1864 due to an illness.

Shortly after the Civil War, Smith moved to Atlanta. In the city, which had been largely destroyed during the Burning of Atlanta, he established a brickyard near the intersection of Peachtree Street and Fourteenth Street in modern-day midtown Atlanta. He had purchased the 14 acres for approximately $100 per acre, with the brickyard producing over ten million bricks before Smith sold the property for a profit. Following this venture, Smith began investing in real estate in downtown Atlanta. By the late 1800s, "Uncle Jack", as he was commonly known in the city, was a successful businessman and prominent socialite. Among his properties was The Bachelor's Domain, a 44-room hotel where each room was called by one of the 44 states in the United States rather than by a room number. (Note: The United States had 44 states between 1890 and 1896.)

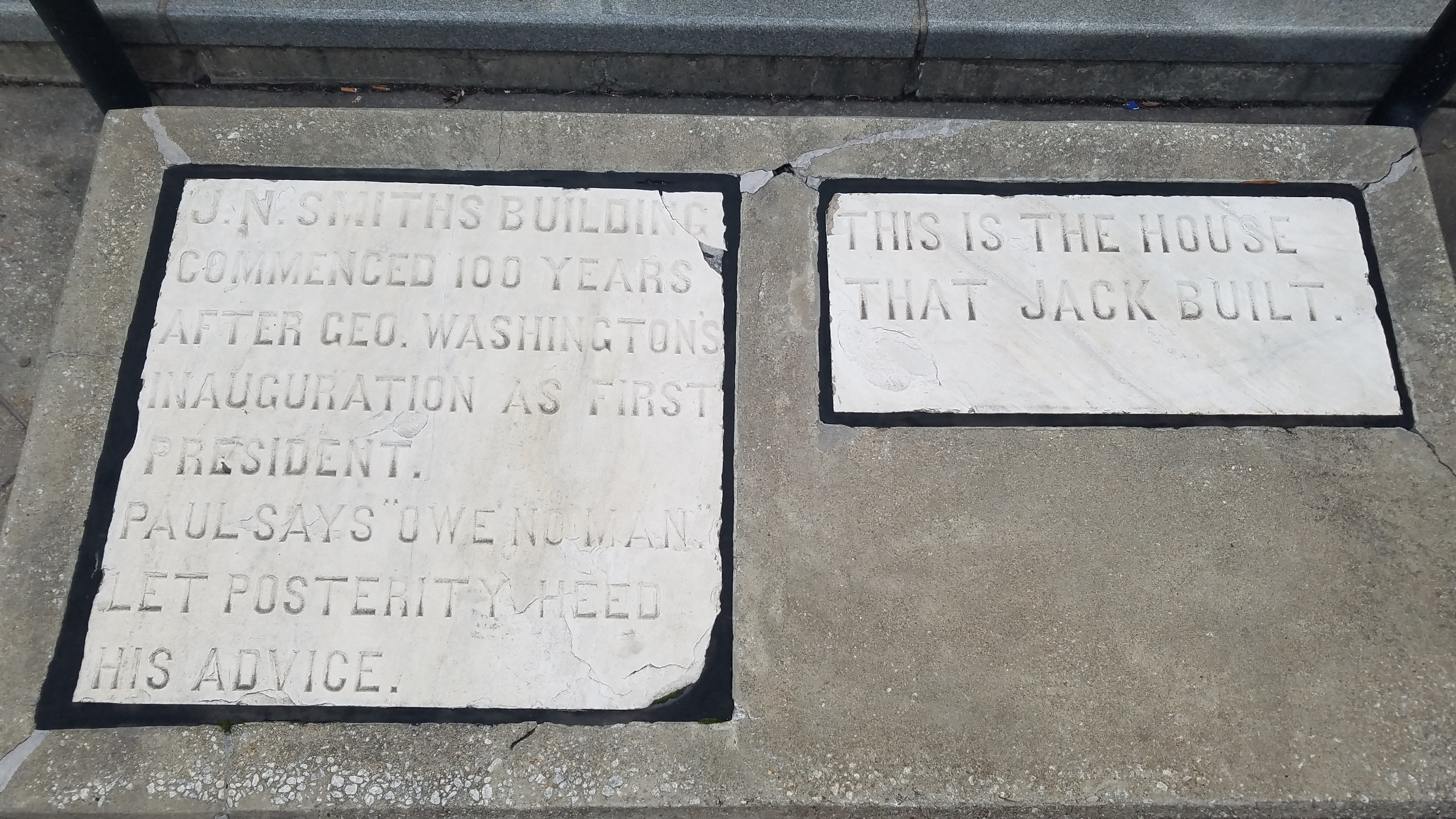
Two of the inscribed slabs near Peachtree Center station

In 1889, Smith built a large commercial building at the intersection of Peachtree Street and Forsyth Street. The building, called "The House That Jack Built", was constructed of granite blocks that had proven unusable for street paving purposes and adorned with marble slabs that had different phrases and sayings, including many Biblical verses. When Smith leased the building and property in 1909, he stipulated that the inscribed slabs should be displayed prominently in any future building or structure built on the property. When MARTA built the Peachtree Center station on the property in 1982, they relocated two of the slabs to a fenced-off area near the subway station entrance, where they still lie.

== Later life and death ==
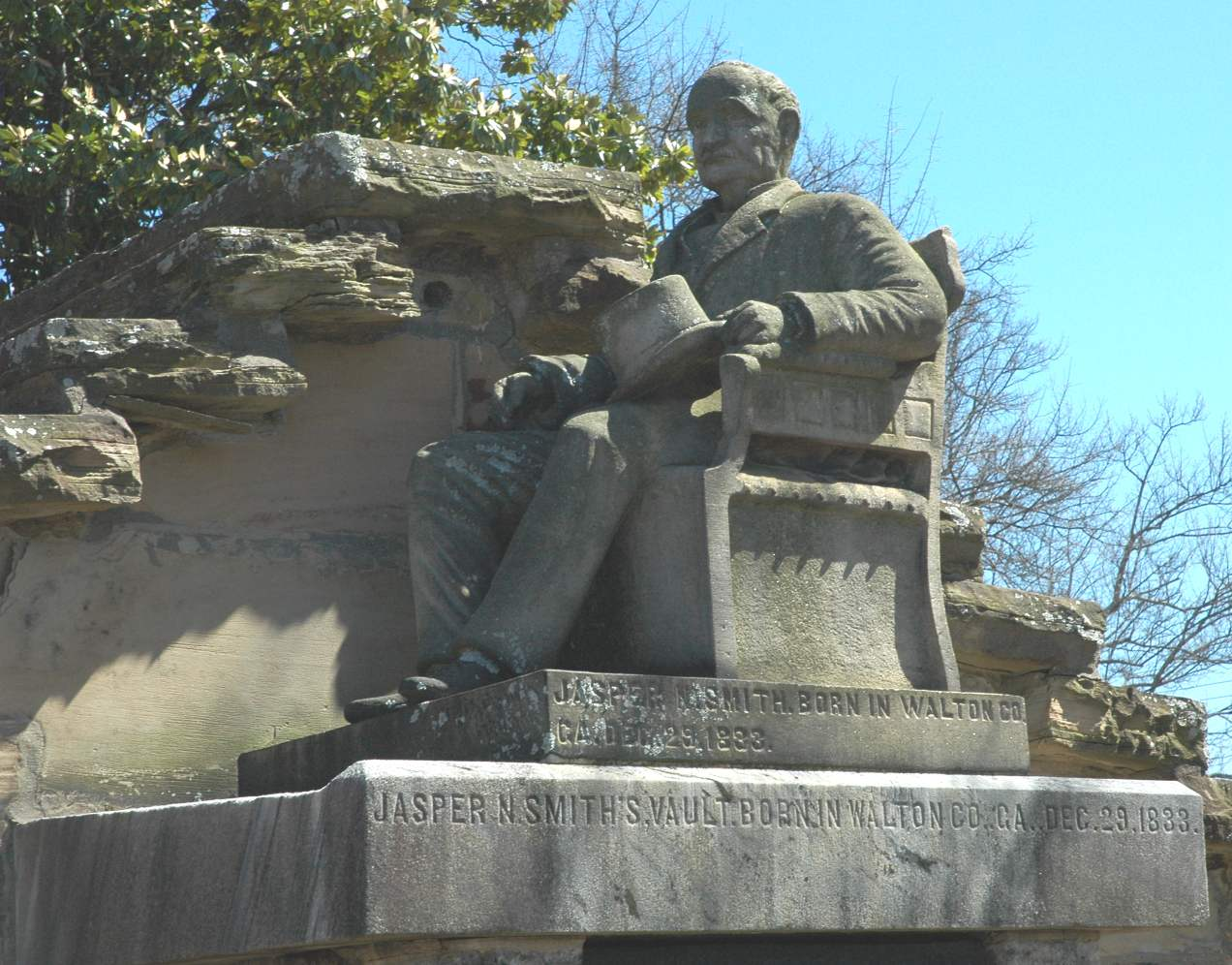
Statue of Smith atop his mausoleum in Oakland Cemetery

Although Smith was an eccentric and odd man (historian Franklin Garrett referred to him as "an unusual man"), he became well-respected later in his life for his business acumen. He was often referred to as "Atlanta's quaintest character."

Smith died on August 16, 1918, in Atlanta. Several years prior to his death, Smith had commissioned the construction of a mausoleum in Oakland Cemetery, with a life-sized statue of himself accompanying it. According to one story, the sculptor Oliver W. Edwards had originally carved the statue with Smith wearing a necktie. However, Smith, who refused to wear neckties, refused to pay until the tie was removed from the sculpture. Despite Smith's well-documented dislike of neckties, the veracity of this story has been questioned, including by the daughter of the sculptor. Another story claims that when Smith became aware of a vine that had climbed the statue and wrapped itself around the statue's neck, he went to the cemetery and personally removed the vine. As one of the first statues built on the original 6 acres of the cemetery, he is sometimes referred to as the "Mayor of Oakland".

== Bibliography ==
- Christian, Reese (August 29, 2008). Ghosts of Atlanta: Phantoms of the Phoenix City. Arcadia Publishing. ISBN 978-1-62584-369-2 – via Google Books.
- Cooper, Walter Gerald (1896). The Cotton States and International Exposition and South, Illustrated: Including the Official History of the Exposition. Illustrator Company – via Google Books.
- Garrett, Franklin M. (1969). Atlanta and Environs: A Chronicle of Its People and Events, 1880s-1930s. Vol. II. University of Georgia Press. ISBN 978-0-8203-3905-4 – via Google Books.
- Kaemmerlen, Cathy J. (October 29, 2007). The Historic Oakland Cemetery of Atlanta: Speaking Stones. Arcadia Publishing. ISBN 978-1-62584-420-0 – via Google Books.
- Keen, Raymond (September 28, 2016). "Jasper "Jack" Smith - Atlanta's Quaintest Character". History Atlanta.
- Williford, William Bailey (1962). Peachtree Street, Atlanta. University of Georgia Press. ISBN 978-0-8203-3477-6 – via Google Books.
