= Atlanta Union Station (1871) =

1871–1930 train station in Atlanta, Georgia

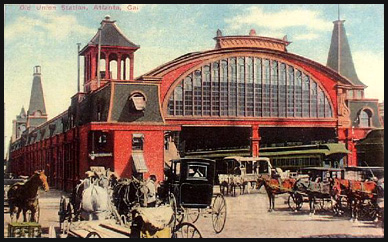
- Atlanta's 1871 Union Station

General information
- Location: Atlanta, Georgia; United States
- Coordinates: 33.7526411°N 84.3891037°W

Construction
- Architect: Max Corput

History
- Opened: 1871

Former services
Atlanta & West Point Railroad (before 1905)
Atlanta, Birmingham & Atlantic Railway (before 1915)
Central of Georgia Railway (before 1905)
Georgia Railroad
Louisville & Nashville Railroad
Nashville, Chattanooga & St. Louis Railway
Seaboard Air Line Railroad (before 1919)
Southern Railway (before 1905)
Western & Atlantic Railroad
Location

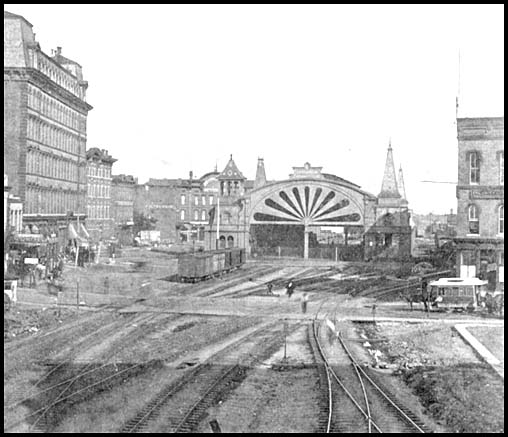
Atlanta's 1871 Union Station

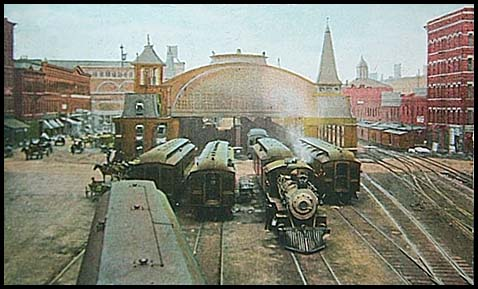
Atlanta's 1871 Union Station

Atlanta's second Union Station was built in 1871 on the site of the 1853 station, burned in mid November 1864 when Federal forces left Atlanta for the March to the Sea. It was built in Second Empire style, designed by architect Max Corput. It was located at what is now Wall Street between Pryor Street and Central (now Shirley C. Franklin Ave). Its eastern corner for many years held the original Zero Mile Marker, which has since been moved to the Atlanta History Center.

It was replaced by the 1930 Union Station three blocks northwest and one block southwest.

As of 2011, a parking structure is located on the site of the 1853 and 1871 stations.

== Notable people ==
Philanthropist Carrie Steele Logan worked at the station as a matron for many years.
