= Martha Loftin Wilson =

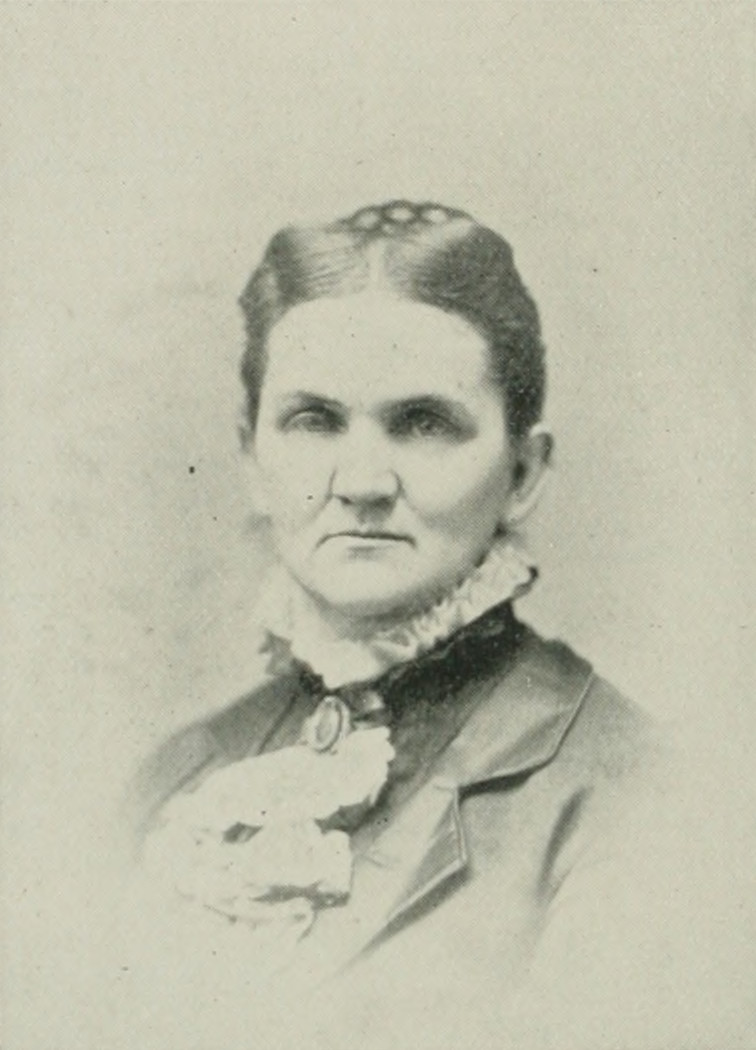
- Portrait from "A Woman of the Century"
- Born: Martha Eleanor Loftin; January 19, 1834; Clarke County, Alabama, U.S.
- Died: June 11, 1919 (aged 75); Atlanta, Georgia, U.S.
- Resting place: Oakland Cemetery, Atlanta
- Education: Dayton Masonic Institute, Alabama
- Occupations: missionary worker; journal editor
- Spouse: John Stainback Wilson (m. 1850; died 1892)
- Children: 6
- Writing career
- Language: English
- Genre: Southern United States literature
- Notable works: Hospital Scenes and Incidents of the War

Martha Loftin Wilson (née, Loftin; January 19, 1834 – June 11, 1919) was an American missionary worker and journal editor, as well as a pioneer Atlanta resident and a nurse in the American Civil War. She was regarded as "the most influential leader in the Woman's Missionary Union in Georgia". Wilson was the author of Hospital Scenes and Incidents of the War.

== Early life and education ==
Martha Eleanor Loftin was born in Clarke County, Alabama, January 19, 1834. She was a Baptist from early childhood, having been baptized in 1845.

She was educated in the Dayton Masonic Institute in Alabama.

== Career ==
On November 14, 1850, she married John Stainback Wilson, M.D. During the American Civil War, she worked in the hospitals of Richmond, Virginia, Camp Winder, and Camp Jackson, with her husband, who was a surgeon. At that time, she wrote a book, Hospital Scenes and Incidents of the War, which was in the hands of the publishers, with the provision that the proceeds should go to the sick and wounded. The manuscript was burned in the fall of Columbia, South Carolina. A part of the original manuscript was deposited in the cornerstone of the Confederate Home in Atlanta. Dr. and Mrs. Wilson were in the Battle of Jonesborough, where General William Sherman captured part of the command, and the badly wounded were sent under Dr. and Mrs. Wilson's care to Macon, Georgia, and those not injured to northern prisons.

Her career was associated with the duties of corresponding secretary of the central committee of the Woman's Baptist Missionary Union of Georgia. The central committee was organized by the home and foreign boards of the Southern Baptist Convention, November 19, 1878, in Atlanta, with Wilson as president. She also served as the Georgia editor of the Baptist Basket, a missionary journal published in Louisville, Kentucky. Wilson was for some time president of the Southside Woman's Christian Temperance Union and of the Woman's Christian Association of Atlanta, both of which she aided in organizing. At the same time, she taught an infant class of 60 to 75 in her church's Sunday school. Although her husband died on August 2, 1892, she continued her work without interruption.

== Personal life ==
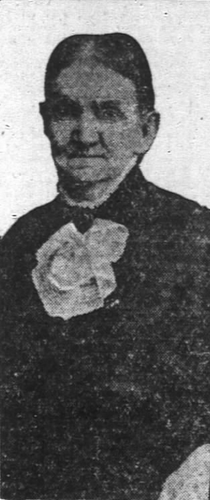
1919

Wilson had been a member of the Second Baptist church from early childhood, and was always connected with the institutions of the denomination. She died June 11, 1919, in Atlanta, and was buried in that city's Oakland Cemetery. She was survived by her daughter and three of her five sons.

== Selected works ==
- Hospital Scenes and Incidents of the War
