= Carrie Steele Logan =

American philanthropist (c.1829 – 1900)

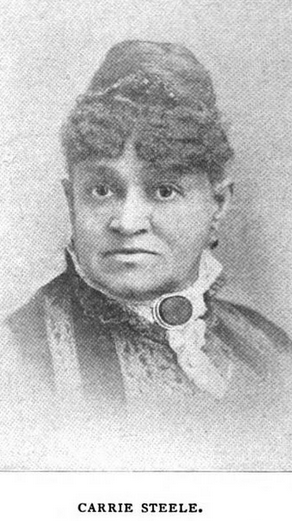
- Steele Logan in 1898
- Born: c. 1829; Georgia, U.S.
- Died: November 3, 1900 (aged 70–71); Atlanta, Georgia, U.S.
- Resting place: Historic Oakland Cemetery, Atlanta, Georgia, U.S.
- Occupation: Philanthropist
- Known for: Founder of the oldest black orphanage in the United States
- Spouse: Josiah Logan (m. 1890)
- Children: 1
- Awards: Georgia Woman of Achievement (1998; posthumous)

Carrie Steele Logan (c. 1829 – November 3, 1900) was an American philanthropist, founder of the oldest black orphanage in the United States. The home, The Colored Orphanage of Atlanta, was officially dedicated on June 20, 1892.

== Early life ==
Carrie Steele was born into slavery in Georgia in about 1829. She learned how to read and write during slavery. She was orphaned as a small child. Steele Logan's experiences as a "seventeen year-old slave mother undoubtedly influenced her understanding of the difficulties of negotiating life with limited resources."

== Career ==
Steele sold handmade candies and cakes when she first moved to Atlanta; later she found work as a matron at the train depot in Atlanta. This job allowed her to save enough money to buy a $1,600 (~$46,579 in 2023) home by 1885. Working there, she saw many displaced children, homeless and without adults to care for them. She started looking after some of the orphans herself, but soon realized a larger, more sustainable response was needed. "It is appointed to me in my old age to accomplish what I believe to be a great and glorious work," she wrote, "and one that shall live long after my poor frail body has dropped into the dust whence it came."

=== Philanthropy and activism ===
One way that Logan raised money to found the Colored Orphanage of Atlanta was to give speeches. For example, she obtained thirty dollars after speaking to Concord Baptist Church in Brooklyn, New York concerning the importance of her life's work. The City Council of Atlanta donated $500 to the orphanage. The Community Chest in Atlanta and many other African American advocacy groups and newspapers, such as the Savannah Tribune promoted the opportunity to donate to the orphanage. Along with a charter from the state of Georgia, donations from the city's growing black middle class, and her own funds, she opened the orphanage in Atlanta in 1889. It is considered the oldest such institution in the United States.

By 1892, the orphanage had a new three-story brick building built on a stone foundation which could house and educate up to fifty children. Steele wrote an autobiography, which she sold to raise funds for the orphanage. The secretary of the orphanage was Floyd Crumbly, the chief organizer of the Georgia Real Estate Loan and Trust Company.

== Personal life and legacy ==
In 1843, Carrie Steele had a son, James Robert Steele, who was a barber. They moved to Atlanta together after Emancipation. She married Josehia (or possibly Joseph) Logan, a minister from New York, in 1890. James Robert Steele worked as a porter for several years before becoming a barber. After opening a barbershop on Marietta Street it was unfortunately not as successful as expected. Later in life he became an elder of Bethel AME Church and also purchased a home in the late 1880s. She died of a stroke on November 3, 1900, aged 71 years, and her memorial service was "One of the largest funerals I have ever seen," according to H. R. Butler, an eyewitness, who counted at least 3,000 attendees. "All the orphan children were out. Nearly every minister in the city was present." Her gravestone in Atlanta's Historic Oakland Cemetery is inscribed "Mother of Orphans/She hath done what she could."

Steele's orphanage is still in operation, now named the Carrie Steele-Pitts Home, on a large campus outside the city. In 1998, Carrie Steele Logan was named as a Georgia Woman of Achievement. There is a bronze bas relief sculpture of Logan on Auburn Avenue in Atlanta.
