= Peachtree Center station =

MARTA rail station

N1 Peachtree Center
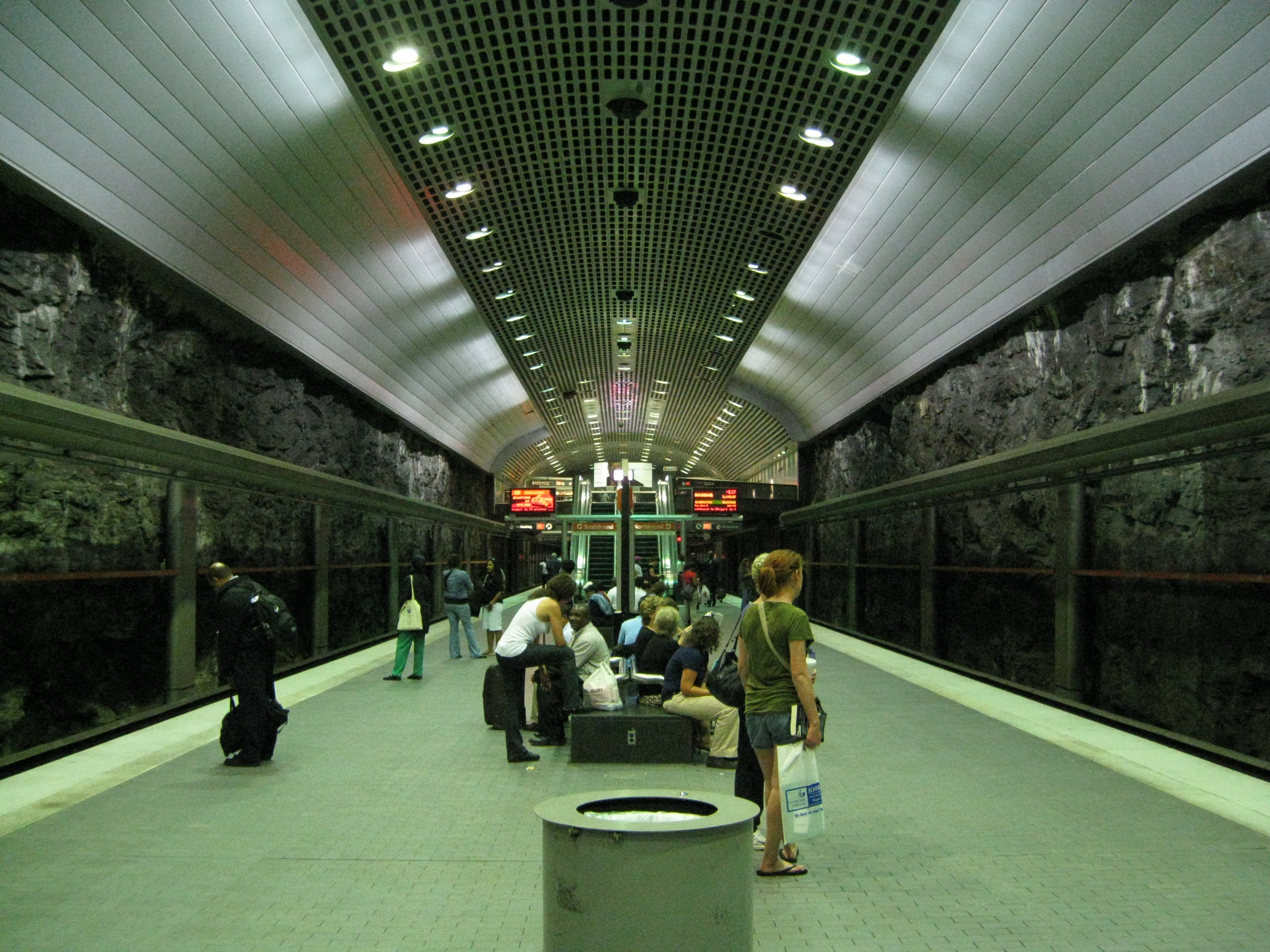

General information
- Location: 216 Peachtree Street NE; Atlanta, Georgia 30303
- Coordinates: 33.759677°N 84.387548°W
- Platforms: 1 island platform
- Tracks: 2
- Connections: MARTA Bus: 40; Atlanta Streetcar; CobbLinc; Ride Gwinnett; GRTA

Construction
- Structure type: Underground
- Parking: None
- Cycle facilities: 5 bike racks
- Accessible: Yes
- Architect: Toombs, Amisano and Wells

Other information
- Station code: N1

History
- Opened: December 11, 1982; 43 years ago

Passengers
- 2013: 7,453 (avg. weekday) ▲6%

Services
Preceding station	MARTA	Following station
Five Points toward Airport	Red Line	Civic Center toward North Springs
Five Points toward Airport	Gold Line	Civic Center toward Doraville
Out-of-system transfer, at street-level stop
Carnegie at Spring toward Centennial Olympic Park	Atlanta Streetcar	Woodruff Park One-way operation
Location

Peachtree Center is an underground subway station on the Red and Gold lines of the Metropolitan Atlanta Rapid Transit Authority (MARTA) rail system. It is the deepest station in the MARTA rail system, at 120 feet (37 m) below Peachtree Street. It serves the Peachtree Center neighborhood of downtown Atlanta, and has access to Georgia State University via the Atlanta Streetcar. It is the first station north-northeast of the rail system hub at Five Points, and is one of the busiest stations on the Red/Gold Lines, handling over 15,000 people per weekday.

== History ==
=== Construction ===
Although the operation of the North Line began between the Garnett and North Avenue stations on December 4, 1981, the Peachtree Center station between them did not open until September 11, 1982. A poster dating to 1982 on the station platform describes how the station was built. The poster reads:

MARTA's moving Atlanta, 120 feet below Peachtree Street.

The Peachtree Center station was built by tunneling through solid gneiss, a granite like rock formed of layers of quartz and mica. This rock provides underground support for the station. Soft ground or mixed tunneling was used where there was insufficient rock structure for underground support. With this method, compressed air twice the normal atmospheric pressure was used to support the walls while permanent structures were being built. Like deep sea divers, workers on this section of the rapid rail transit system were required to undergo 30 minutes of compression/decompression when entering or coming out of the tunnel. This station is only one of a few tunnels in the world where the walls and the ceiling were carved from solid rock.

Length of longest escalator serving the station entrance across from the Atlanta Public Library is 190 feet- the longest in the southeast. Cost of Station: approx. $45 million. Station depth: 120 feet. Station length: 900 feet.

An exploratory tunnel was initially driven at the crown of the tunnel to provide input into rock quality. The cavern was constructed using a heading and bench approach, first excavating the heading and following with the bench excavation. All excavation on the cavern was accomplished using drill and blast methods. Vibration monitoring stations were established in buildings along Peachtree Street to monitor the vibrations and compare to contract limits.

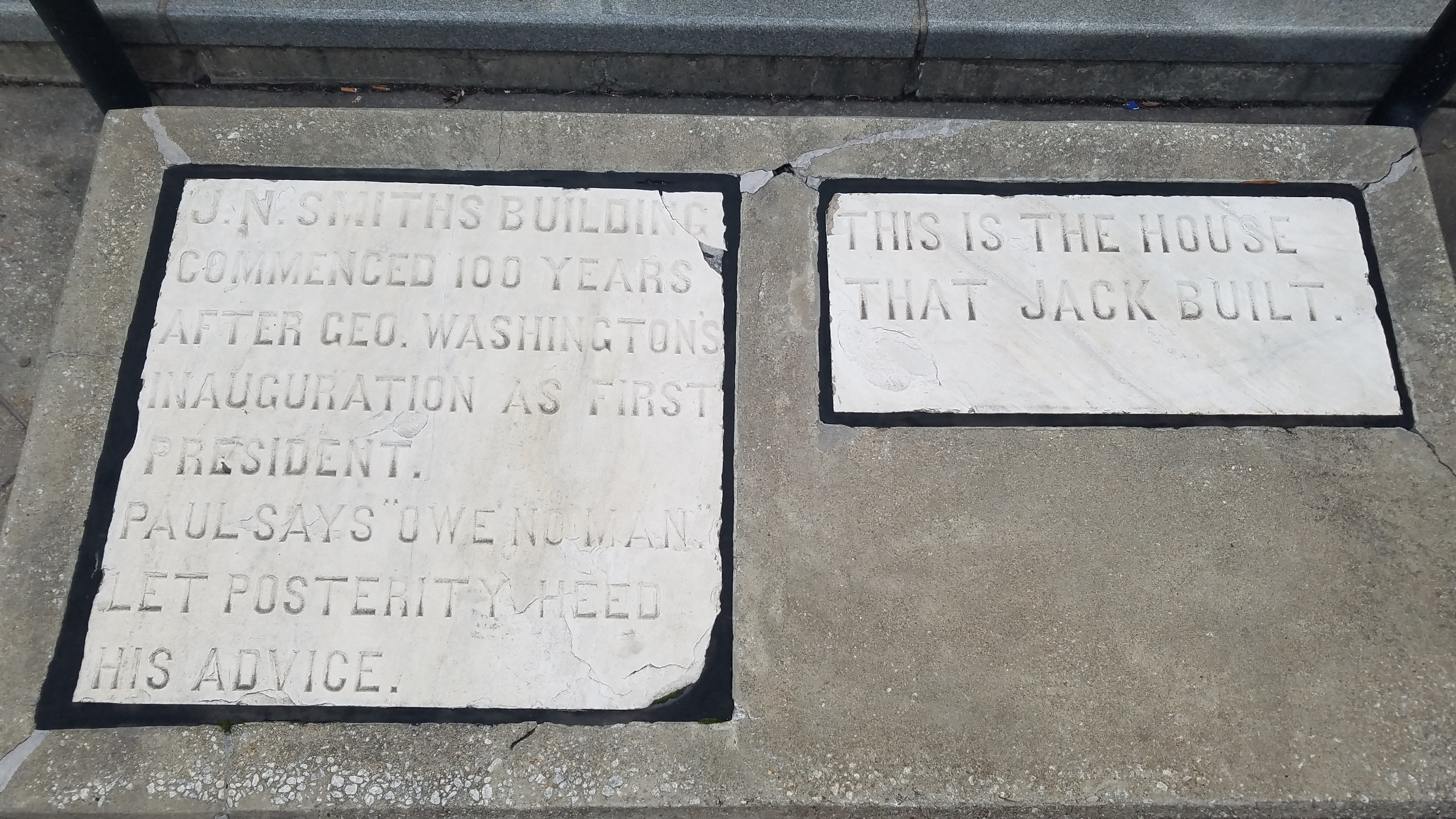
Marble slabs from Jasper Newton Smith's building, located near the station's entrance.

The location the station was built on was originally the home to "The House That Jack Built", an eccentric commercial building built by Jasper Newton "Jack" Smith in the late 1800s. As part of a lease agreement Smith made with later leaseholders of the property, two inscribed marble slabs were to be displayed prominently in any future building constructed on the site. When Peachtree Center station opened in 1982, these two marble slabs were relocated to a fenced-off area near the subway station entrance.

== Station layout ==
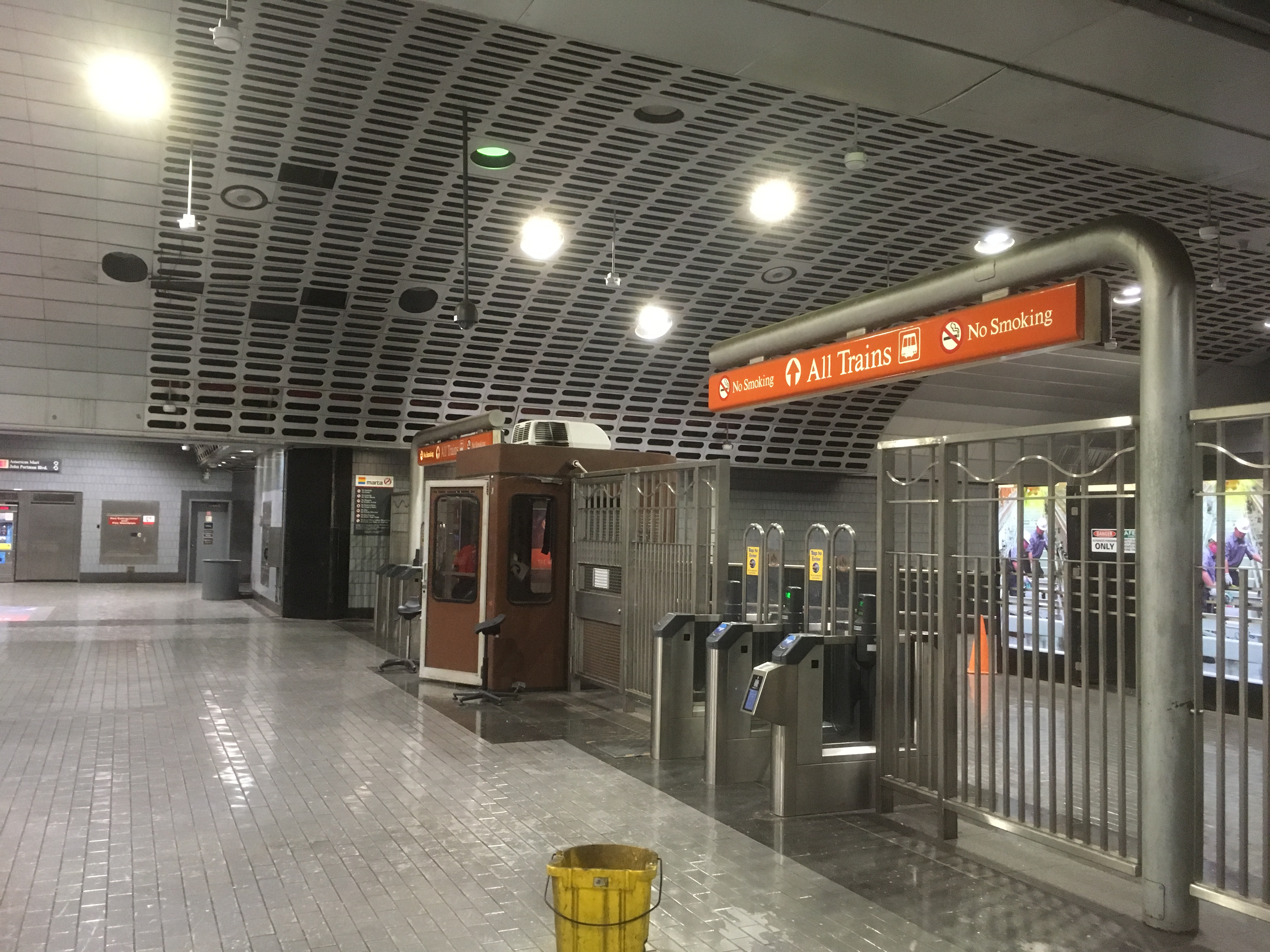
North turnstiles on the Mezzanine level.

G	Street Level	Entrance/Exit
M	Mezzanine	Fare barriers
P Platform level	Southbound	← Red Line, Gold Line toward Airport (Five Points)
P Platform level	Island platform, doors will open on the left
P Platform level	Northbound	Gold Line toward Doraville (Civic Center) → Red Line toward North Springs (Civic Center) →

=== Interior design ===
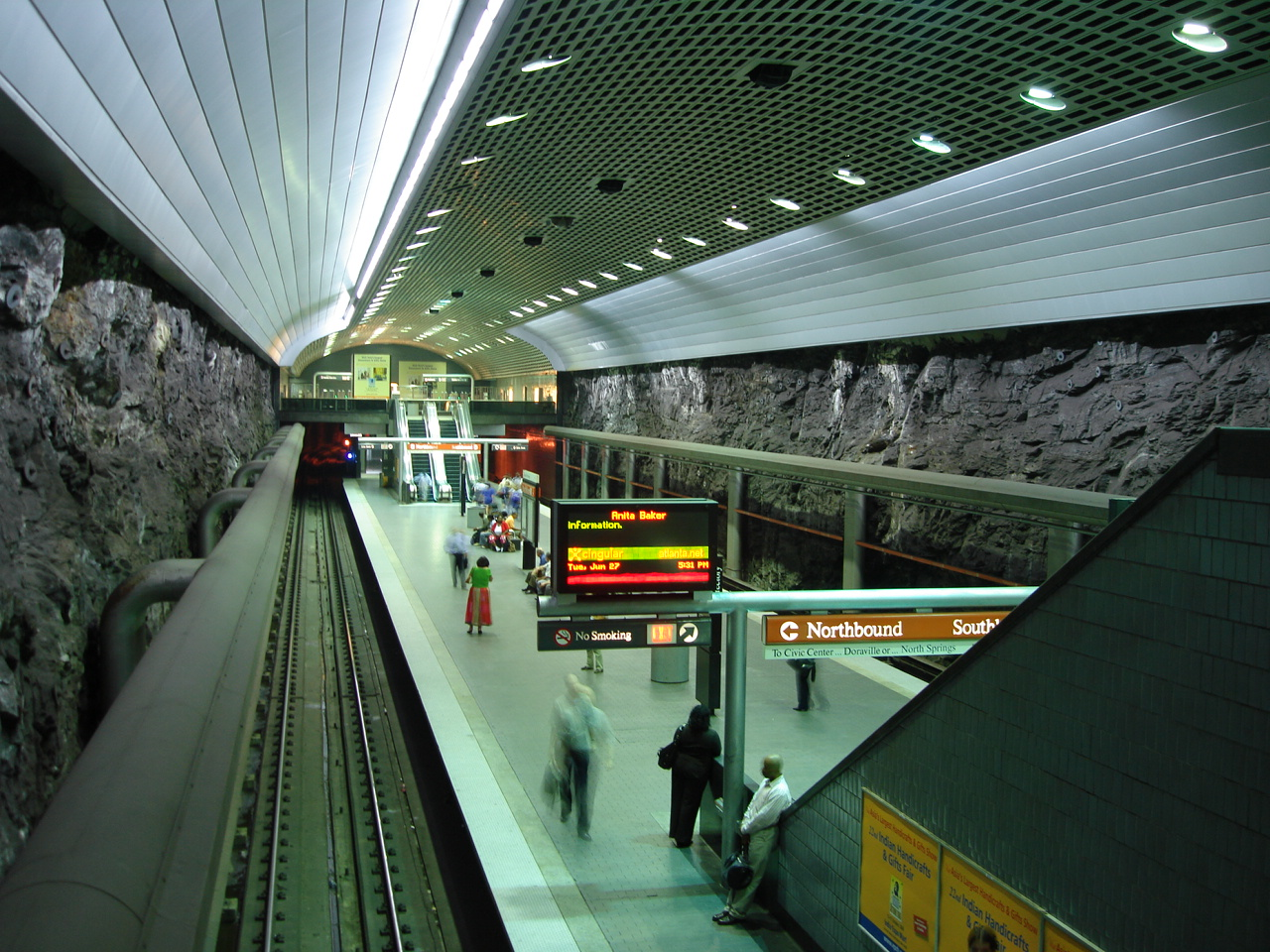
Image overlooking the station, note the gneiss walls on the outside of the tracks.

The station has an island platform serving two tracks. The floor is made of gray tile, the "walls" are made of solid gneiss rock, and the ceiling panels are made of steel. Four escalator banks are used to access the station, with the Carnegie Way/Ellis Street (southwest) entrance having the longest escalators in the system, which MARTA claims are also the longest in the Southeast U.S. The freestanding escalator at the CNN Center is longer at 205 feet (62 m). The Ellis Street entrance was closed for more than two years for renovation; it re-opened on August 24, 2012. The Harris Street (northwest) entrance has a map of the MARTA system with formerly proposed lines on it.

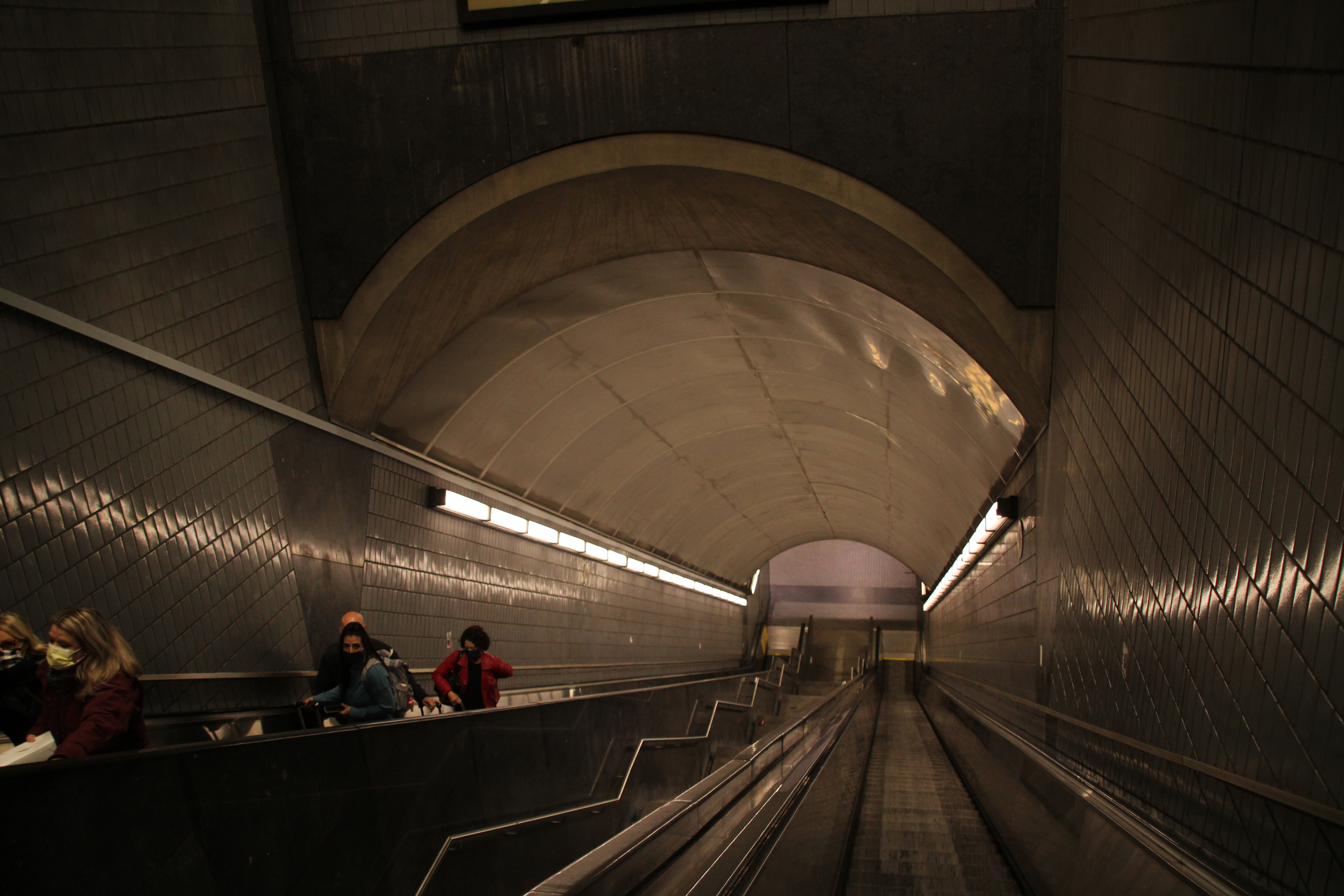
Looking down one of the escalators into the station

== Nearby landmarks and popular destinations ==
- American Cancer Society Center (formerly Inforum)
- AmericasMart
- Atlanta Central Library
- Atlanta Marriott Marquis
- Centennial Olympic Park
- Children's Museum of Atlanta
- CNN Center
- College Football Hall of Fame
- Georgia Aquarium
- Hard Rock Cafe
- Mall at Peachtree Center
- National Center for Civil and Human Rights
- Peachtree Center
- Rialto Center for the Arts
- SAE Institute
- Truist Plaza
- Westin Peachtree Plaza Hotel
- Woodruff Park
- World of Coca-Cola

== Other services ==
Peachtree Center station is served by the following MARTA bus routes:

- Route 40 - Downtown / Peachtree Street

The station is also served by the Atlanta Streetcar and CobbLinc, Ride Gwinnett, and Xpress commuter buses.
