= William Ambrose Wright =

American politician (1844–1929)

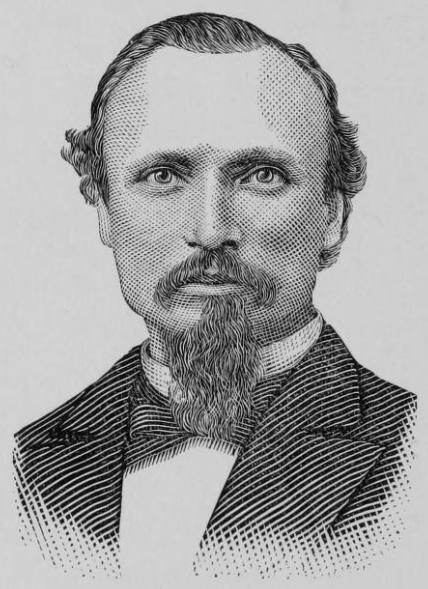

Georgia State Comptroller General
- In office September 17, 1879 – September 13, 1929

Personal details
- Born: January 19, 1844 Louisville, Georgia
- Died: September 13, 1929 (aged 85) Atlanta, Georgia
- Resting place: Oakland Cemetery

William Ambrose Wright (January 19, 1844 – September 13, 1929) was a lieutenant in the Confederate States Army, and Georgia state comptroller for fifty years, as well as insurance commissioner.

== Biography ==
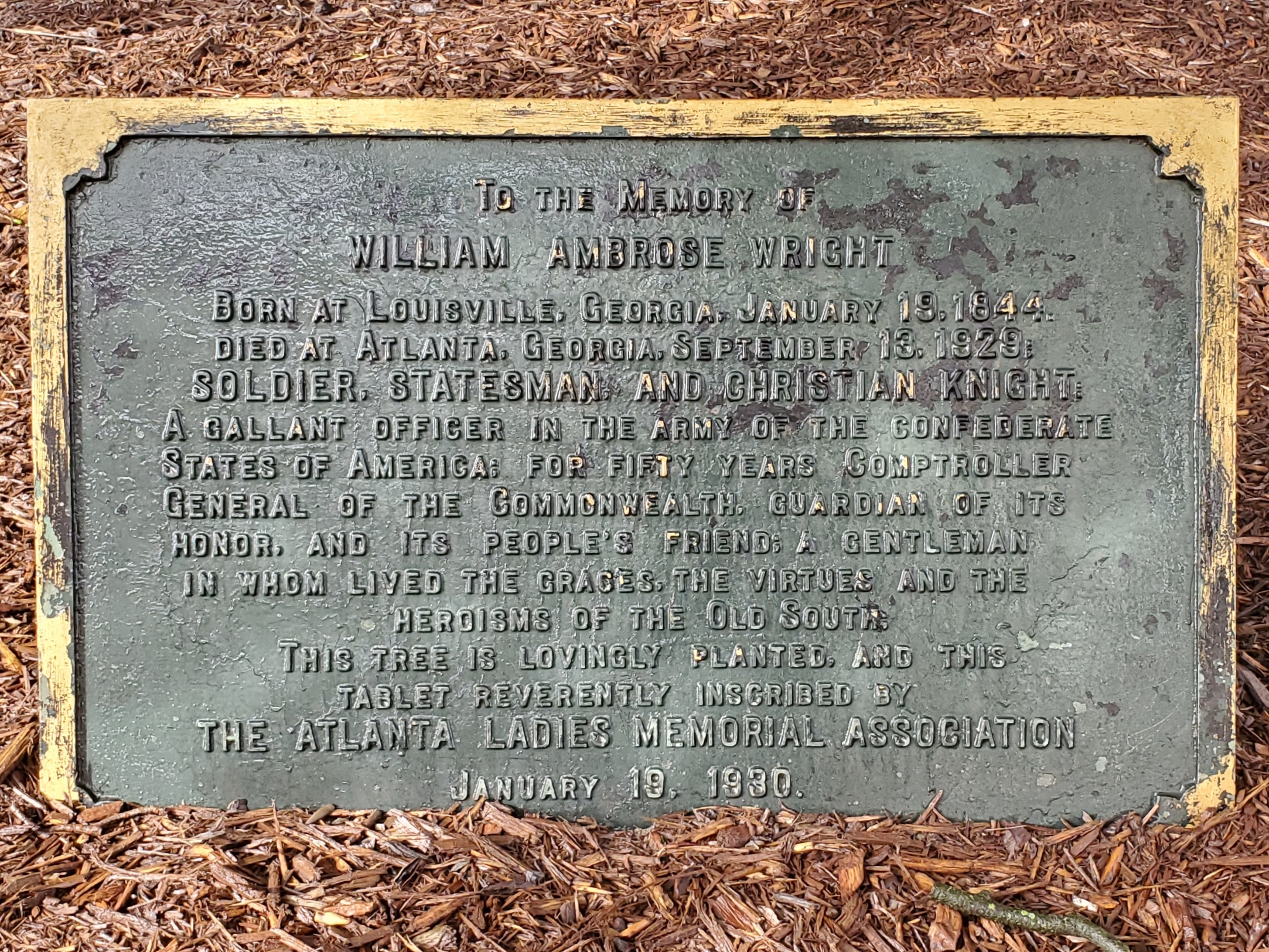
Plaque honoring Ambrose on the grounds of the Georgia State Capitol

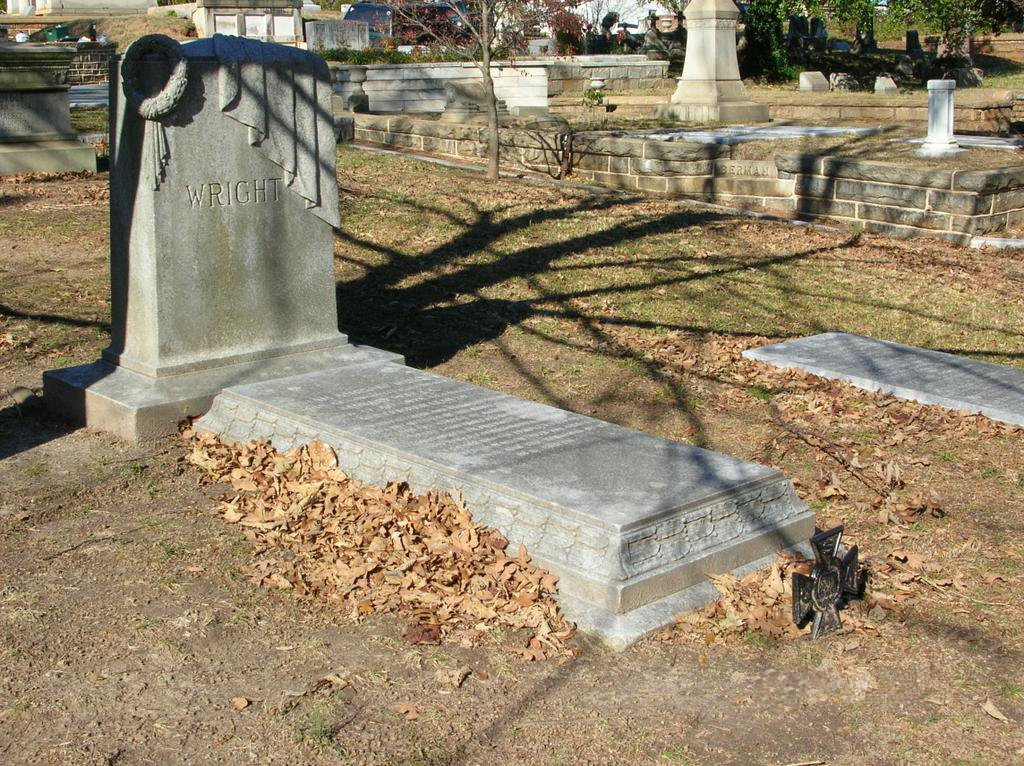
Grave of William A. Wright, Oakland Cemetery, Atlanta

William Ambrose Wright was born in Louisville, Georgia on January 19, 1844. His father, Ambrose R. Wright, was a Confederate general and later a U.S. Representative.

He enlisted in the Confederate States Army in 1860, serving in the 3rd Georgia Infantry under his father. During the Civil War, he was wounded at the Second Battle of Bull Run, resulting in the amputation of his right leg. He was captured and imprisoned at Johnson's Island from June 1863 until May 1864.

Wright was appointed comptroller general of Georgia by Governor Alfred H. Colquitt on September 17, 1879, following the resignation of Washington L. Goldsmith due to ongoing impeachment proceedings.

He remained in office until his death in Atlanta on September 13, 1929. He was buried at Oakland Cemetery.
