= Oakland Cemetery (Atlanta) =

Historic garden cemetery in Atlanta, Georgia, United States

- U.S. National Register of Historic Places
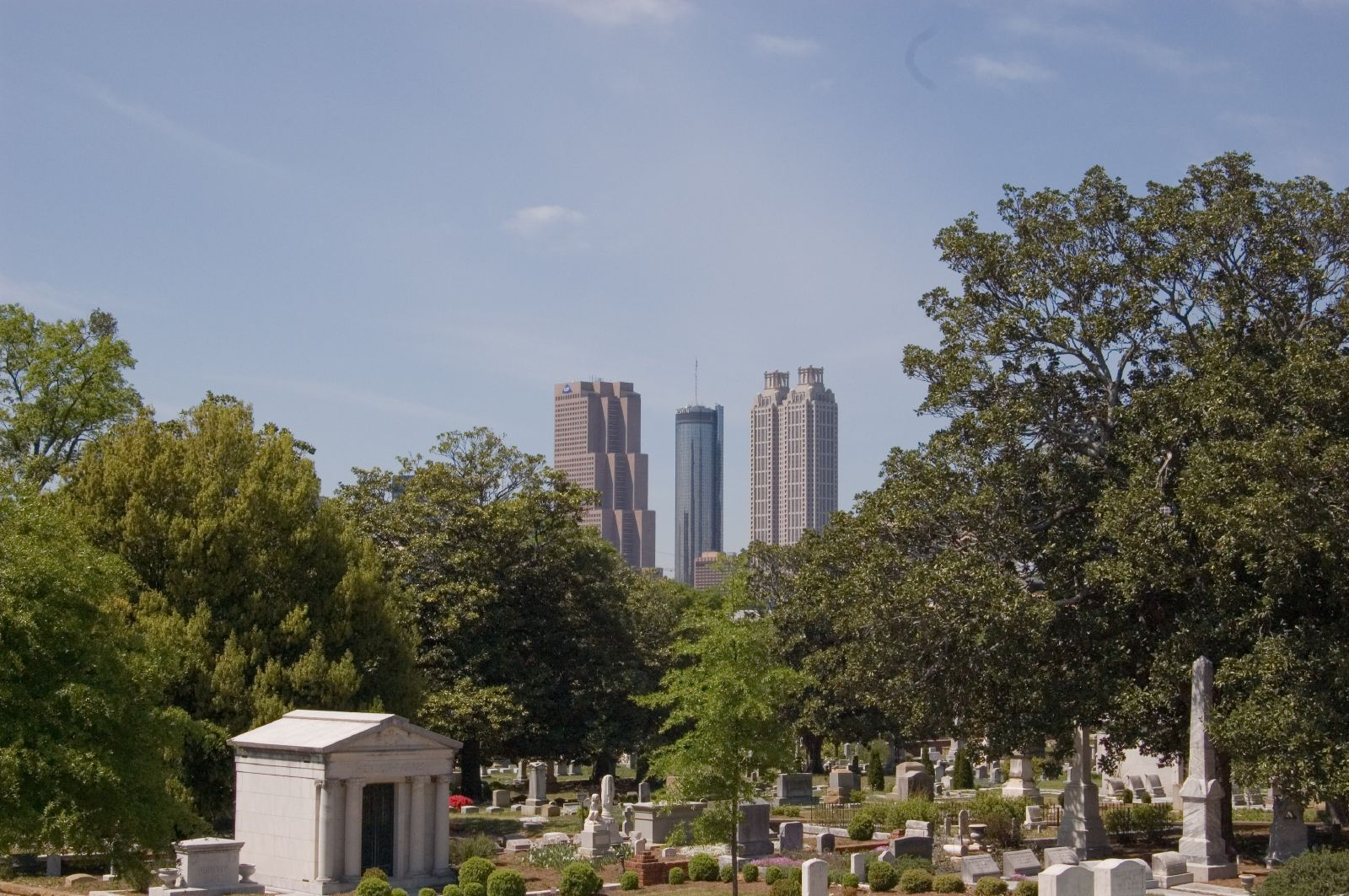
- Oakland Cemetery with the Atlanta skyline in the background

- Location within Atlanta Location within Georgia Location within the United States
- Location: 248 Oakland Avenue, SE, Atlanta, Georgia
- Coordinates: 33°44′55″N 84°22′17″W
- Area: 48 acres (190,000 m^{2}), 2 buildings, 31 objects
- Built: 1850
- NRHP reference No.: 76000627
- Added to NRHP: April 28, 1976

Oakland Cemetery is one of the largest cemetery green spaces in Atlanta, Georgia, U.S. Founded as Atlanta Cemetery in 1850 on six acres (2.4 hectares) of land southeast of the city, it was renamed in 1872 to reflect the large number of oak and magnolia trees growing in the area. By that time, the city had grown and the cemetery had enlarged correspondingly to the current 48 acres (190,000 m^{2}). Since then, Atlanta has continued to expand so that the cemetery is now located in the center of the city. Oakland is an excellent example of a Victorian-style cemetery, and reflects the "garden cemetery" movement started and exemplified by Mount Auburn Cemetery in Massachusetts.

The original 6 acres (24,000 m^{2}) of Oakland remains one of the oldest historical plots of land in Atlanta, most of the rest of the city having been burned in 1864. Because of its age and location, the cemetery directly reflects the history and changing culture of the City of Atlanta and the significant events it has seen. Names of Atlanta streets, buildings, parks, subdivisions, and more can be found within the cemetery gates. An estimated 70,000 people are interred at Oakland, and while the last plots were sold in 1884, there are still regular burials today. These are largely conducted on family-owned plots or areas owned by Atlanta (one of the most recent being former mayor Maynard Jackson, whose plot was contributed by the city).

== Sections ==
=== Original 6 acres (24,000 m^{2}) ===
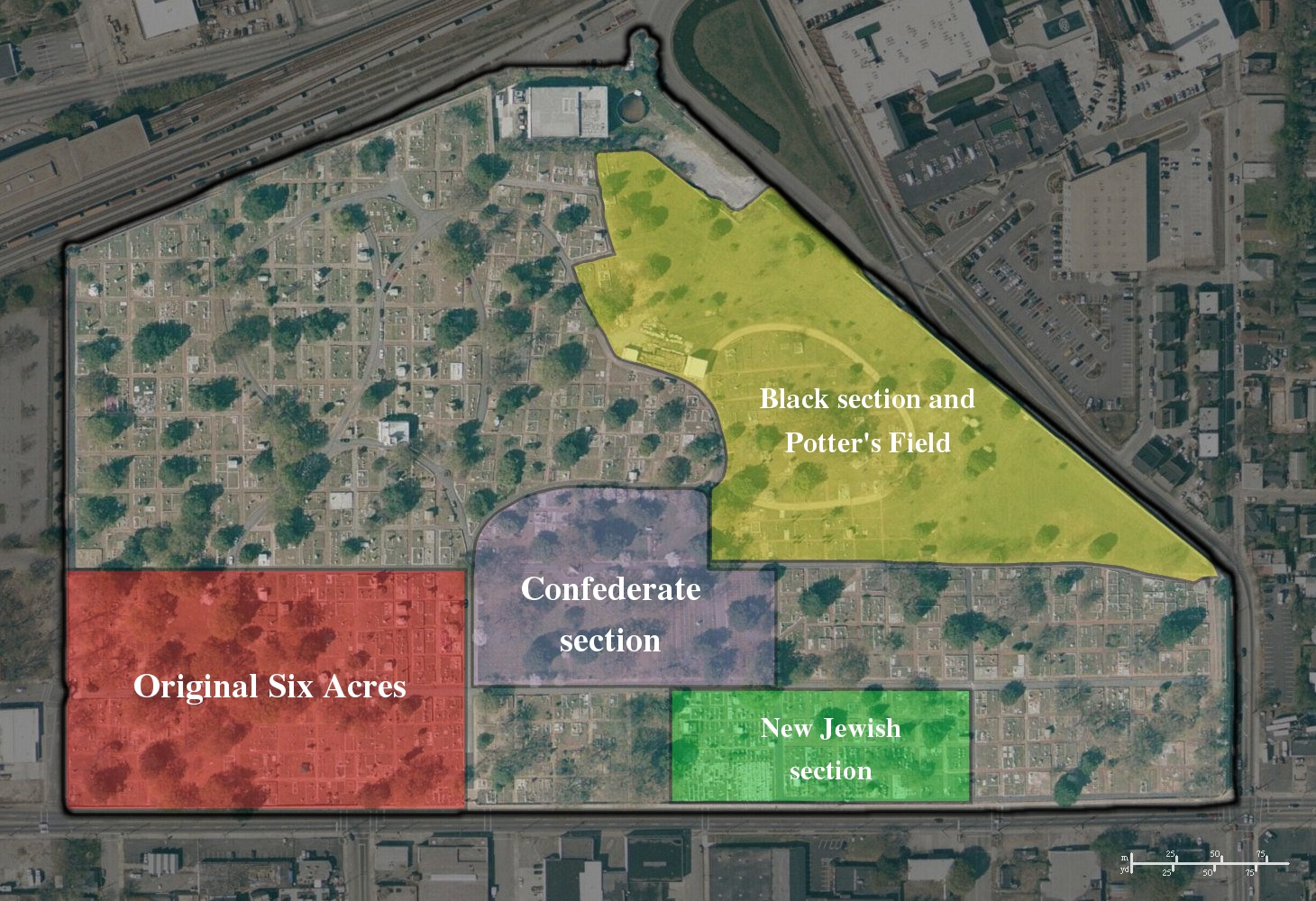
Aerial map

Immediately upon entering the gates of Oakland is found the original 6 acres (24,000 m^{2}) purchased for use as the Atlanta Cemetery in 1850. The gates and perimeter walls were not erected until 1896, the date engraved on the keystone of the gates' highest arch. After a short distance along a brick walkway, Oakland's first resident since its establishment can be found. Dr. James Nissen was a medical doctor visiting Atlanta who fell ill and died in 1850. Legend has it that Dr. Nissen shared a common fear of the day, being buried alive. Therefore, before his death he asked that his jugular vein be cut prior to his burial to ensure he did not wake up later under the ground. Being the oldest grave in Oakland since its designation as a city cemetery, Nissen's headstone is nearly completely worn away by the passage of time and the elements. The inscription is only known due to an extensive survey of Atlanta cemeteries performed in the 1930s by Franklin Garrett. Back towards the main gates of Oakland on a plot donated by the City of Atlanta lies Martha Lumpkin Compton. The daughter of Governor Wilson Lumpkin, from 1843 until 1845 Atlanta was known as "Marthasville" in her honor.

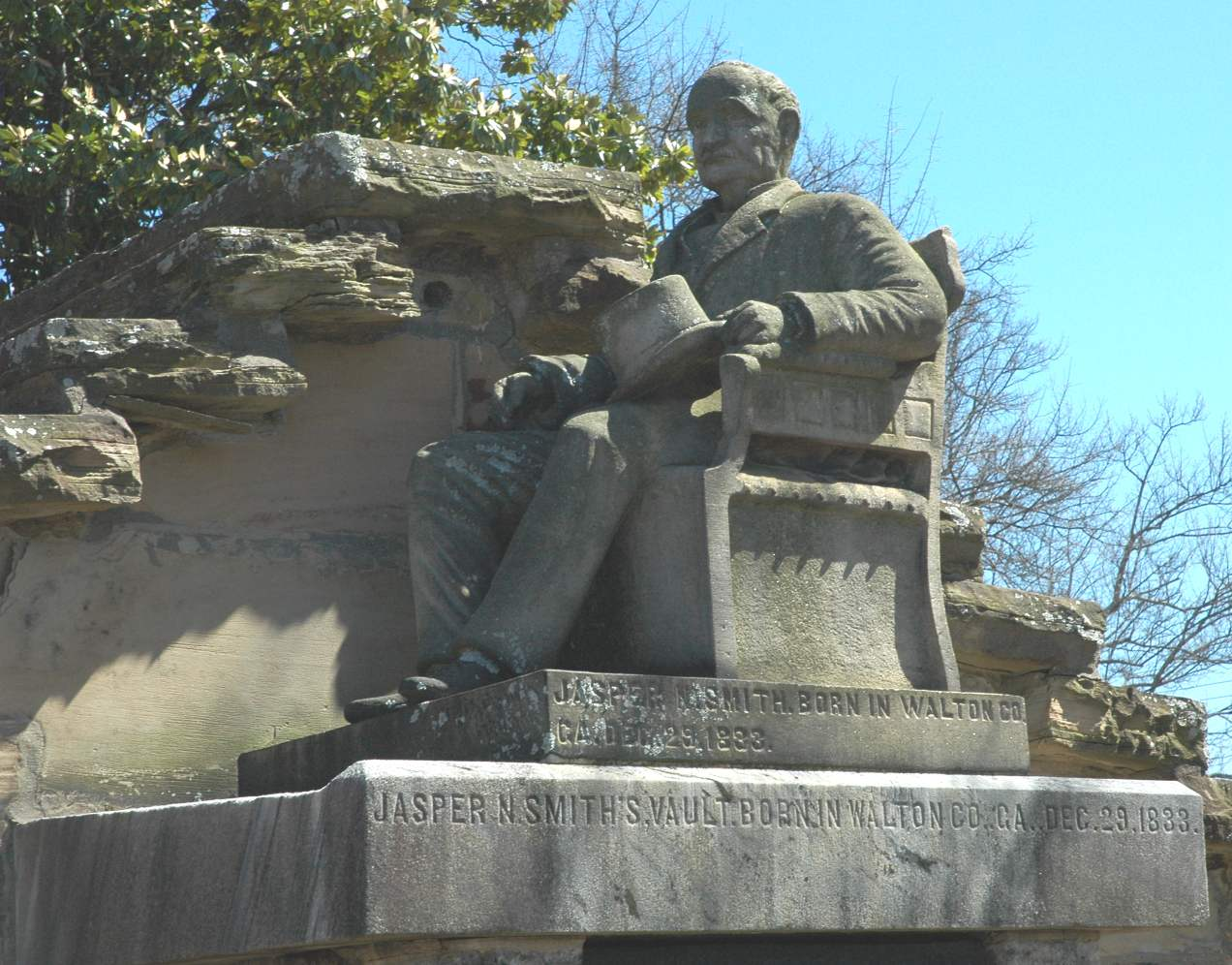
Statue of Jasper Newton Smith atop his mausoleum

The first thing many people notice when entering the gates of Oakland is the mausoleum of Jasper Newton Smith, on which sits a striking life-size statue of Smith himself. Smith was a businessman and real estate investor who rose to prominence in post-war Reconstruction Era Atlanta. Smith was well known for refusing to wear a necktie due to a bad experience as a child. Therefore, one story describing the creation of his statue notes that when the artist sculpted him wearing a cravat, Smith refused to pay until the offending item had been chiseled off. Another story notes that Smith once travelled to the cemetery to personally remove a vine that had wrapped around the neck of the statue.

Farther into this section the Kontz Memorial and the Neal Monument, two sculptures showing vastly different styles of artistry, can be seen. The latter is an example of Neoclassical art and imagery, while the former is Oakland's only known example of Egyptian Revival. Also to be found in the original 6 acres (24,000 m^{2}) is a small area of land marking the old Jewish section. This area was bought by the Hebrew Benevolent Congregation (which later bought more land in the expanded cemetery) and is the second oldest Jewish burial ground in the state of Georgia, preceded by a colonial Jewish cemetery in Savannah.

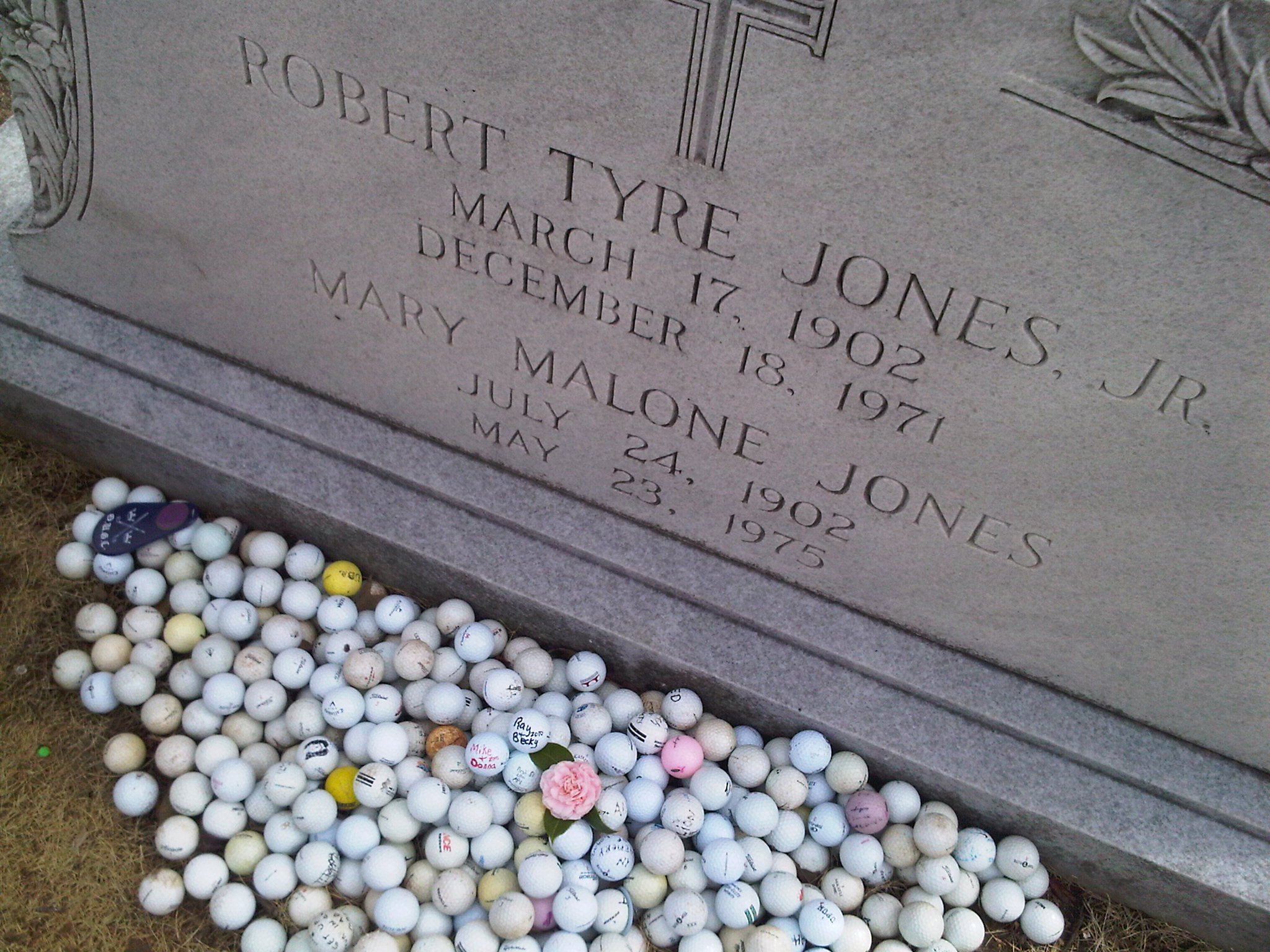
Robert Tyre "Bobby" Jones

Also resting in the original 6 acres (24,000 m^{2}) is Robert Tyre "Bobby" Jones, an Atlanta-native amateur golfer known for first winning The Double. His grave can always be found with golf balls and other paraphernalia relating to the sport. The immediate area surrounding Jones' grave is adorned by all eighteen flower-bearing plants that are the namesakes of the holes on the Augusta National course. Franklin Garrett, a man dubbed "Atlanta's Official Historian" who extensively cataloged Atlanta's history as well as many of the graves at Oakland and other Atlanta-area cemeteries, also rests in the original 6 acres (24,000 m^{2}).

While walking throughout the original 6 acres (24,000 m^{2}), and indeed much of the entire cemetery, many visitors will notice a lack of ironwork which is uncommon to a cemetery from Oakland's era. This is due to the City of Atlanta's contribution of much of the original ironwork in Oakland to the U.S. government for use in producing arms during World War I.

=== Confederate section ===
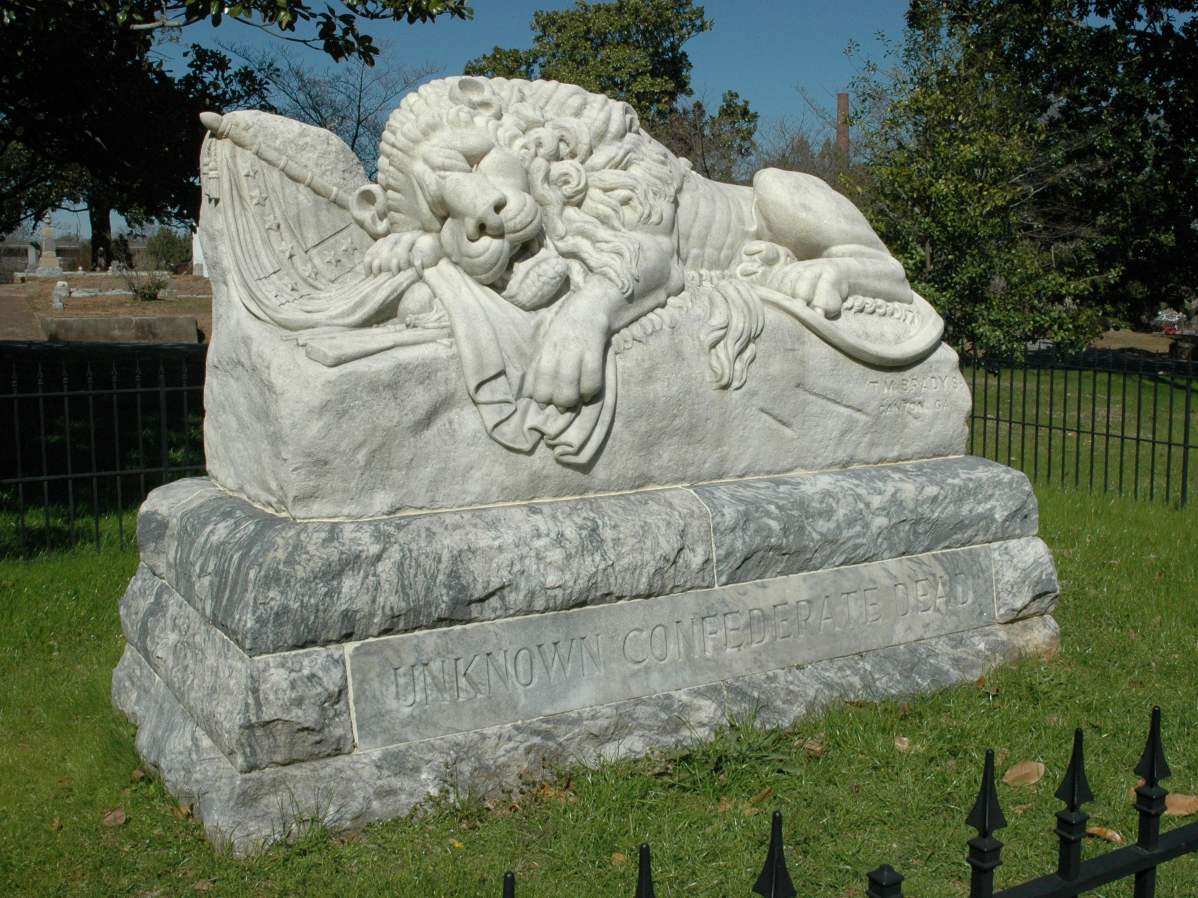
Lion of the Confederacy - removed from Oakland Cemetery August 18, 2021.

The Confederate section of Oakland is home to an estimated 6,900 burials, of which about 3,000 are unknown. During the Civil War, Atlanta was a major transportation and medical center for the Southern states. Since several of the largest military hospitals in the area were within a half mile (800 m) from Oakland, many soldiers who died from their wounds were buried here. Shortly after the war ended, a few thousand fallen soldiers from the Atlanta campaign who were previously buried in battleground graves were moved to the Confederate grounds in Oakland. The area is marked by a large monument known as the Confederate Obelisk. This 65 foot (20 m) tall obelisk is made from granite quarried from Stone Mountain and was dedicated on April 26, 1874, the anniversary of Joseph E. Johnston's surrender to William Sherman. For a number of years, the Confederate Obelisk was the tallest structure in Atlanta. To the northwest, very close to the obelisk itself, are buried four Confederate generals, John B. Gordon, Lucius J. Gartrell, Clement A. Evans, and Alfred Iverson, Jr. To the south of the obelisk is a large section of marked military graves. Of special note are the 16 marked graves of Union soldiers that are buried alongside Confederate soldiers. This practice was very uncommon at the time, but was likely done at Oakland due to dwindling burial space. Formerly located in the Confederate section was the Lion of the Confederacy, or Lion of Atlanta. The lion sculpture was removed by the City of Atlanta on August 18, 2021, after repeated vandalism. The lion, which guarded a field containing the remains of unknown Confederate dead, was commissioned by the Atlanta Ladies Memorial Association and carved by T. M. Brady in 1894 out of the largest piece of marble quarried from north Georgia up to that time. Though Brady claimed that the design was original, with a few exceptions it is actually a near copy of the Swiss Lion of Lucerne.

=== New Jewish section ===
Headstone in the new Jewish section

Located relatively close to the old Jewish section contained in the original 6 acres (24,000 m^{2}), the plots designated as the "new" Jewish section were acquired by the Hebrew Benevolent Congregation in 1878 and 1892. The burial sites, and the headstones and monuments marking them, reflect the blending of the German-Jewish culture of which the Benevolent Congregation was primarily comprised, and the American culture that the community had adopted. In contrast to this cultural blending are the resting places of members of the Ahavath Achim Synagogue, to which the Benevolent Congregation sold some of the plots. Members of the Ahavath Achim Synagogue were mostly Eastern European Jewish immigrants who were much more Orthodox. Unlike the Benevolent Congregation, the Synagogue sought to preserve their traditional culture and to avoid cultural blending. This is evident in the grave sites of members of the Synagogue, which are identifiable by their use of the Hebrew language and engravings of traditional Jewish symbols. In more recent years, the new Jewish section fell victim to vandalism by two teenaged locals in 1982.

=== Potter's Field ===
Potter's Field is a 7.5 acre (3 hectare) area that is traditionally designated for burial of those without the means to purchase a plot of land. Beyond the outer wall bordering the field is the former Fulton Bag and Cotton Mill (since renovated into loft apartments) and Cabbagetown, both constructed by Jacob Elsas, who is buried in the new Jewish section. By 1884 all of the traditional plots at Oakland had been sold. This meant that peoples' only options for burial at Oakland were to either buy a plot from a private owner or be buried in Potter's Field, and records show that many people opted for the latter. Potter's Field makes a significant contribution to the number of residents at Oakland, as indicated by a 1978 archaeological survey conducted by Georgia State University that revealed the entire area to be occupied by an estimated 17,000 persons.

=== Black section ===
This section of the cemetery is a testament to the period of history during which segregation was at its height in the United States. The entire cemetery reflects the great cultural changes that occurred in Atlanta during its service; from the Jim Crow era exhibited by the segregated black section to the modern era that strives for social equality, as shown by the recent burial of Maynard Jackson on a plot in the original 6 acres (24,000 m^{2}) of Oakland. One striking feature that visitors will notice is that the black section, similarly to the adjoining Potter's Field, lacks a great deal of headstones, monuments, and grave markers in general. This is because many grave markers here were made of wood and other biodegradable materials. These markers have succumbed to the passing of time and as a result have rendered a large portion of the grave sites in the black section unknown. Despite the social difficulties that had to be overcome by African-Americans living in the Southern states at the time, there are several outstanding black figures buried at Oakland who made significant contributions to the history of Atlanta. Some of these include Bishop Wesley John Gaines, Reverend Frank Quarles (an early benefactor of Morehouse College), Carrie Steele Logan, and Antoine Graves, the owner of the only mausoleum in the black section.

=== Bell Tower ===
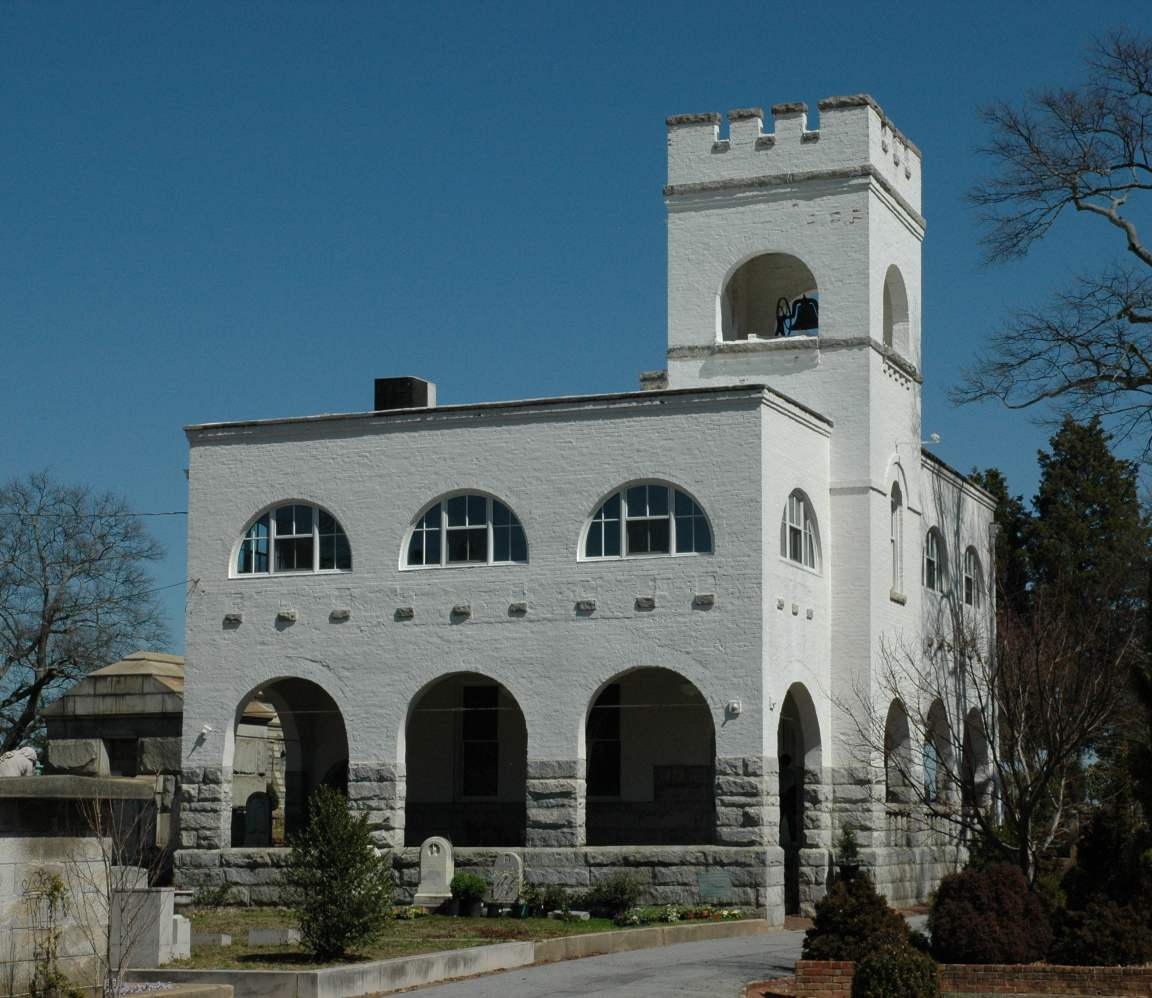
Bell Tower Building

Before the Bell Tower was constructed in 1899, a farmhouse owned by James E. Williams, who would later be mayor of Atlanta, stood in the spot. From this location, General John B. Hood directed Confederate forces in the Battle of Atlanta on July 22, 1864. The Bell Tower building as it stands today was originally the sexton's office and living quarters. Atop the tower is a bell that was formerly used to signal for workers to gather at that location, and for funerals. The basement was used as a vault for storing coffins awaiting burial. In 1998 the Bell Tower building saw extensive restoration and now serves as the offices of the Historic Oakland Foundation as well as the cemetery's visitor center.

=== Monuments and mausolea ===
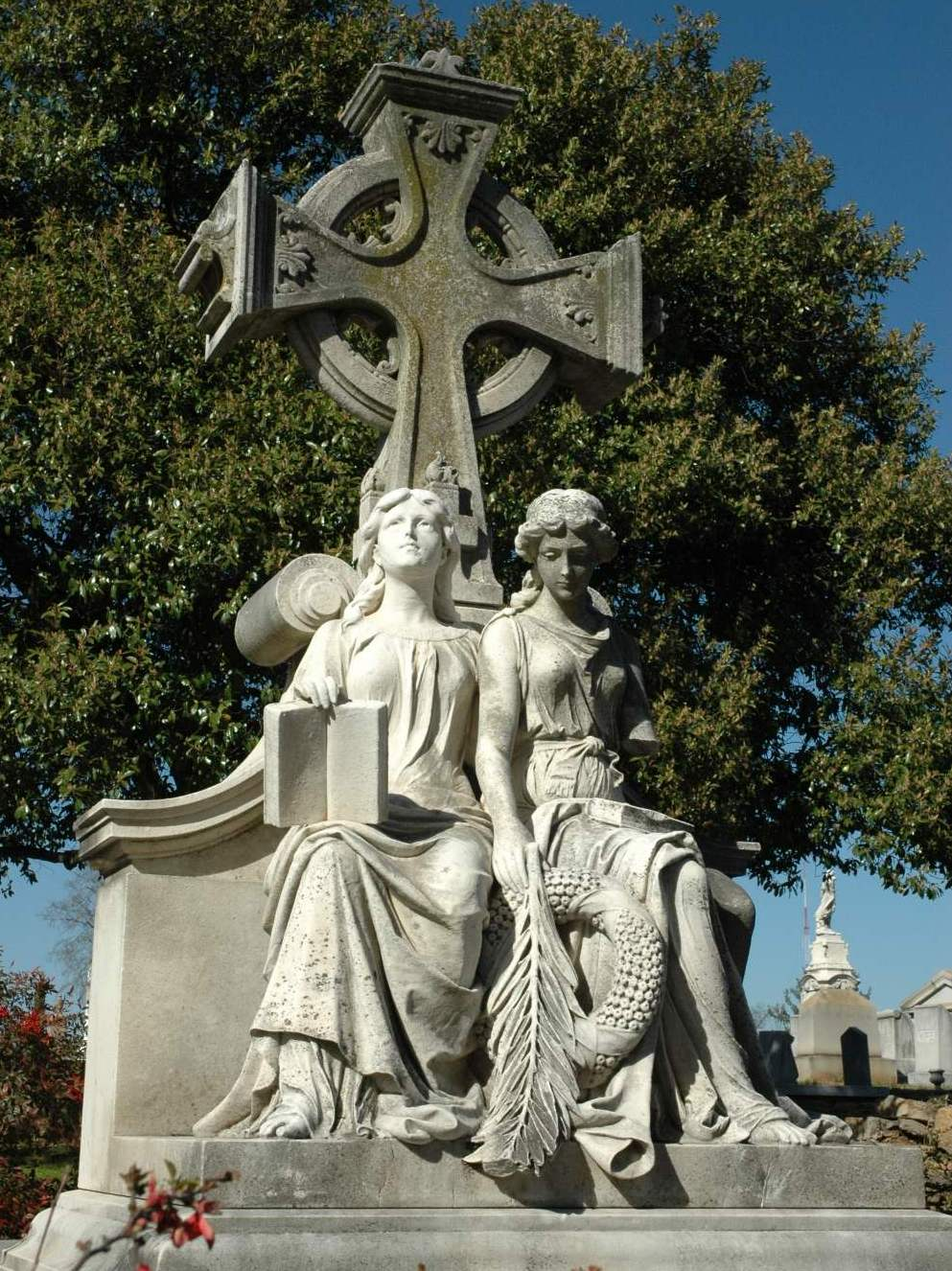
Neoclassical Neal Monument

As with most cemeteries of comparable size and age, Oakland contains numerous monuments and mausolea that are often outstanding examples of art and symbolism, or are of great historical significance. In the southeast area of the cemetery is a historical marker describing the events surrounding the Great Locomotive Chase, in which Union raiders stole the locomotive General with the intent of cutting vital telegraph lines. They were captured by Confederate forces and seven of them were hanged in Oakland and temporarily interred there before being moved to the National Cemetery at Chattanooga. Near the Bell Tower lies a monument dedicated by the City of Atlanta to its first mayor, Moses Formwalt, who was also the youngest Atlanta mayor at 28 years old.

Sitting atop a hill near the original 6 acres (24,000 m^{2}) is the Austell Mausoleum, likely the most elaborate in Oakland. The mausoleum was constructed by Alfred Austell, one of the founders of Atlanta National Bank, in the Gothic Revival style. The Austell Mausoleum cost around $90,000 to build in the 1880s, and is estimated to cost over $3 million to replace by today's standards. Another notable burial on the original 6 acres (24,000 m^{2}) is the rose-adorned site of the Marsh family, on which Margaret Mitchell Marsh, author of Gone with the Wind, rests. Near the Marsh grave is a gas lamp that was one of the original 50 installed by the Atlanta Gas Light company in 1856. The lamp, which bears scars from the shelling of Atlanta in 1864, was donated to the cemetery by Franklin Miller Garrett. The keen observer might notice that the plaque that describes the gas lamp's history incorrectly dates the lamp to 1850.

== Historic Oakland Foundation ==
Since Oakland is not and was never a perpetual care cemetery, maintenance of grave sites was the responsibility of the families of the interred. Of course, time sees the movement of families and the general disconnection with ancestors as generations pass. Because of this, many grave sites have fallen into disrepair from neglect and sometimes vandalism. Therefore, shortly after Oakland was added to the National Register of Historic Places on April 28, 1976, the Historic Oakland Foundation was established. The Foundation has overseen the restoration and upkeep of many grave sites, monuments, mausolea, and buildings that had been affected by the ravages of time. Their activity, which is supported by donations, grants, and special events, continues today as they maintain and restore the cemetery as well as provide guided tours of the grounds.

== Notable burials ==
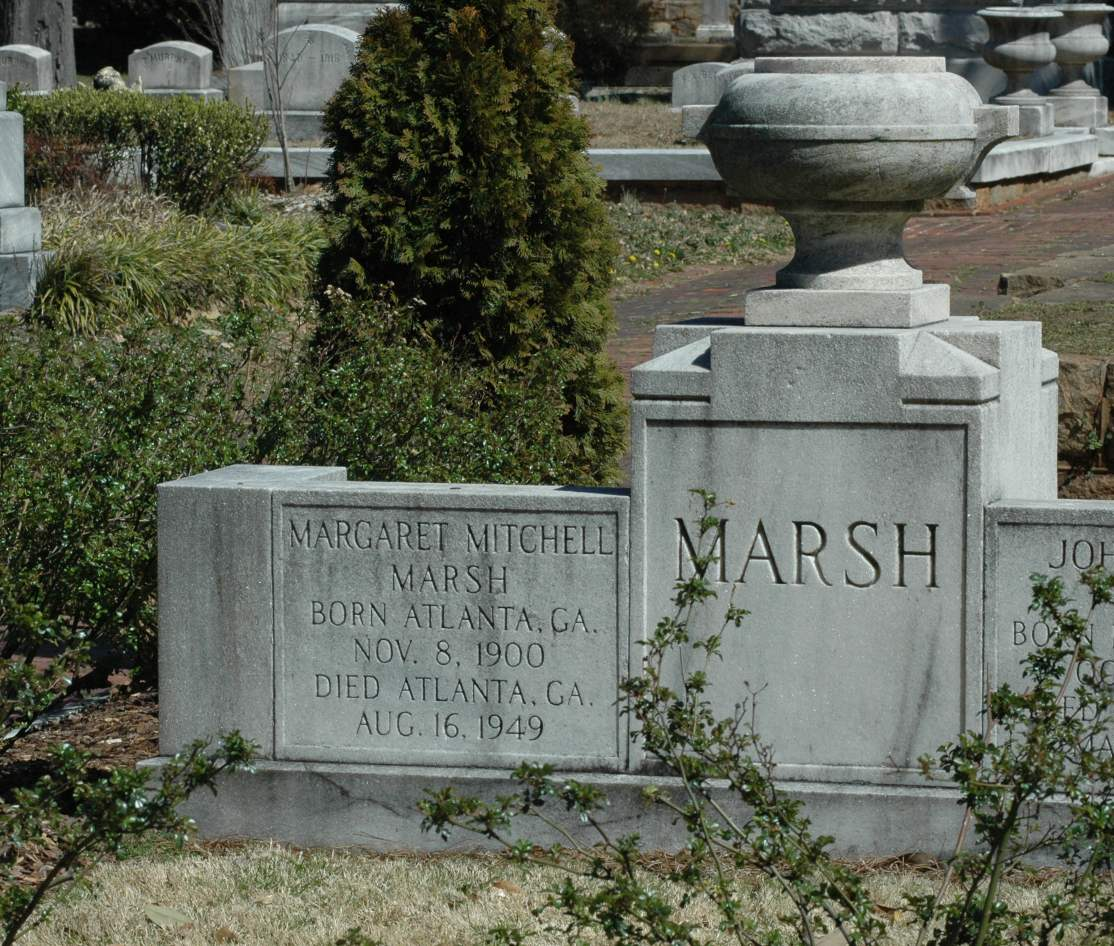
Margaret Mitchell Marsh

- 27 former Atlanta mayors, including:
  - Ivan Allen, Jr.
  - James M. Calhoun (1811–1875)
  - William Lowndes Calhoun (1837–1908)
  - Moses Formwalt (Atlanta's first mayor)
  - Maynard Jackson (Atlanta's first African-American mayor)
  - S. B. Spencer
- 6 former Georgia governors:
  - Joseph E. Brown (1821-04-15 – 1894-11-30)
  - Joseph Mackey Brown (1851-12-28 – 1932-03-03)
  - John B. Gordon (1832-02-06 – 1904-01-09)
  - William J. Northen (1835-06-09 – 1913-03-25)
  - John Marshall Slaton (1866-12-25 – 1955-06-11)
  - Hoke Smith (1855-11-02 – 1931-11-27)
- Confederate Generals:
  - Lucius J. Gartrell
  - Clement A. Evans (1833-02-25 – 1911-07-02)
  - John B. Gordon
  - Alfred Iverson, Jr.

Other burials

- Orelia Key Bell, poet
- Franklin Miller Garrett (1906-09-25 – 2000-03-05), Atlanta historian who surveyed cemeteries. He was dubbed "Atlanta's Official Historian"
- Joel Hurt, founder of Inman Park and Druid Hills, two of Atlanta's first planned subdivisions
- Bobby Jones (1902-03-17 – 1971-12-18), amateur golfer
- Anne Winship Bates Leach (1896–1977), heiress and philanthropist
- Carrie Steele Logan (c. 1829 – 1900-11-03), founder of the first black orphanage in Georgia
- Eugene Mitchell, lawyer and president of the Atlanta Board of Education
- Margaret Mitchell, author of Gone with the Wind
- Kenny Rogers (1938–2020), singer, songwriter, musician, actor, record producer
- Ira Yale Sage (1848–1908), Colonel, railroad builder, civil engineer, entrepreneur
- Andrew Steiner, architect and Holocaust survivor saved as many as 7,000 Slovak Jews
- Maybelle Stephens Mitchell, suffragist and activist
- Alexander Stephens, Vice President of the Confederate States of America (temporary interment)
- Annie Fitzgerald Stephens, landowner and businesswoman
- Edward A. Vincent, architect of Atlanta's first passenger depot and publisher of the first official map of the city
- Benjamin Franklin White, singing master, and compiler of the shape note tunebook known as The Sacred Harp.
- Juliet Marshall Blackburn Williams (1857–1928), first vice president of the Atlanta Confederate Memorial Association
- Martha Loftin Wilson (1834–1919), missionary worker, journal editor, heroine of the American Civil War
- William Ambrose Wright (1844–1929), Confederate lieutenant

== Fictional portrayals ==
In Margaret Mitchell's 1936 novel, Gone with the Wind, Oakland Cemetery is mentioned as the final resting place of Scarlett O'Hara's first husband, Charles Hamilton, and as the burial place of many Confederate soldiers who died during the Civil War.

== 2008 tornado ==
On March 14, 2008, Oakland Cemetery sustained significant damage when a tornado tore through downtown Atlanta. The City Sexton, Sam Reed, estimated that 50 to 60 trees were toppled and many more significantly damaged. Dozens of headstones and obelisks were also destroyed. Additionally, debris from other damaged buildings was blown into the cemetery; a shredded window blind was "draped like a necklace" around one marker. It was the first tornado to hit the downtown area since weather record keeping began in the 1880s.

A map of the storm shows that the largest intensity of the storm was centered over the cemetery.

- See article: 2008 Atlanta tornado outbreak.

== See also ==
- List of United States cemeteries
- List of oldest structures in Atlanta

There were other tornadoes that hit downtown Atlanta before blowing out windows of local stores and shops, e.g., Spring 73 or thereabouts. However, the damage may not have been as severe as the EF2 of 2008.
