= William Ezzard =

American politician (1799–1887)

10th Mayor of Atlanta
- In office January 1856 – January 1858
- Preceded by: Allison Nelson
- Succeeded by: Luther Glenn

12th Mayor of Atlanta
- In office January 1860 – January 1861
- Preceded by: Luther Glenn
- Succeeded by: Jared Whitaker

17th Mayor of Atlanta
- In office January 1870 – January 1871
- Preceded by: William H. Husley
- Succeeded by: Dennis Hammond

Personal details
- Born: June 12, 1799 Abbeville, South Carolina, U.S.
- Died: March 24, 1887 (aged 87) Atlanta, Georgia, U.S.
- Party: Democratic Party

William E. Ezzard (June 12, 1799 – March 24, 1887) was a Southern United States politician who served as the 11th, 13th and 19th Mayor of Atlanta, Georgia, in the 19th century.

== Biography ==
Ezzard was born in Abbeville, South Carolina. He moved to Georgia and later represented Elbert County, Georgia, in the Georgia Legislature. He was twice elected as a state senator from that district. After a full term as judge of the Coweta circuit, he settled in Decatur in 1822, being one of the first settlers in DeKalb County. He was again sent to the legislature.

In 1826 DeKalb County Academy was founded and the next year, Ezzard, as well as Judge Reuben Cone and nine others, were named as trustees in the incorporation. In 1827, at the age of 28, he was sent to the Georgia state senate from DeKalb County.

He served as Solicitor General of the Cherokee Circuit from December 8, 1832, to December 1835. Then he was brigadier general of the First Brigade, 11th Division, in the Georgia militia. He resigned in November 1840 and was Judge of the old Coweta Circuit from November 6, 1840, until November 1844. While in that office, he administered the estate of Hardy Ivy and was responsible for subdividing his estate comprising land lot 51.

Ezzard moved to Atlanta in 1850, where he was a law partner to Judge John Collier and operated a dry goods and drug store Smith & Ezzard. He co-founded the Atlanta Bank in 1852 with John Mims, Clark Howell, Sr., Jonathan Norcross, Richard Peters, William Butt, Lemuel Grant, Joseph Winship, N.L. Angier, Joseph Thompson and other investors.

He served three one-year terms as mayor in 1856, 1857 (this was the first time consecutive terms had been served by any mayor. His term included him visiting Charleston, where Atlanta was named the Gate City)) and finally in 1860.

In 1861, he was defeated for a fourth term by Whitaker by the count of 695 votes to 452. He was then a delegate to the Southern Congress, principally in the failed effort to secure the Confederate capitol at Atlanta. During the American Civil War, he represented Atlanta in the Georgia General Assembly house from 1863 to 1865, where he offered a bill to raise soldiers pay to $25 per month (which was passed). Coincidentally, one son, John F. Ezzard, died as a soldier at the age 33 in October 1864.

After the war, he continued his law firm with William Hulsey, and Judge Ezzard defeated Republican William Markham 819 to 762 when he served as mayor for his fourth and last time in 1870. In 1878 he was elected as tax receiver for Fulton County.

He made his home on the future site of the Piedmont Hotel on Forsyth Street. In April 1871, Ezzard joined fellow pioneers to found the Atlanta Pioneer and Historic Society, of which he was voted president with Jonathan Norcross as vice president.

He was buried at Oakland Cemetery in the family lot, but the grave was not marked. He is remembered by Ezzard Street in the southern section of the Old Fourth Ward.

Another son, William Lane Ezzard, co-founded the Gate City Guard in 1855. He died in 1903.

His granddaughter Catherine (daughter of Ezzard's biracial daughter Sinai Calhoun Webb, born a slave in 1830), married Antoine Graves, a prominent black realtor and educator in Atlanta.

== Notes ==
Preceded by John Glen (acting)	Mayor of Atlanta; 1856–1858	Succeeded by Luther J. Glenn
Preceded by Luther J. Glenn	Mayor of Atlanta; 1860–1861	Succeeded by Jared Whitaker
Preceded by William Hulsey	Mayor of Atlanta; 1870–1871	Succeeded by Dennis F. Hammond
