= Dennis Hammond =

American politician (1819–1891)

Dennis F. Hammond

18th Mayor of Atlanta
- In office 1871–1872
- Preceded by: William Ezzard
- Succeeded by: John H. James

Personal details
- Born: Dennis Fletcher Hammond; December 15, 1819 Edgefield County, South Carolina, U.S.
- Died: October 31, 1891 (aged 71) Orlando, Florida, U.S.
- Party: Republican

Dennis Fletcher Hammond (December 15, 1819 – October 31, 1891) was the 18th mayor of the American city of Atlanta, Georgia. He was in office from 1871 to 1872.

== Early life and education ==
Hammond was born in the Edgefield District of South Carolina.

== Career ==
He moved to Georgia where he was a lawyer and, from 1855 to 1861, judge in the superior court Tallapoosa Judicial Circuit.

In Atlanta after the American Civil War, he was politically influenced by William Markham and became a Radical Republican supporting black suffrage.

When Markham refused to run for mayor, Hammond did and was able to briefly unite working-class whites to win the office. This was the last-gasp of Republican power in Reconstruction-era Atlanta.

The Hammond administration was known for its commitment to law enforcement, including enforcement of the Sunday liquor laws.

== Personal life and death ==
After serving one term as mayor, he moved to Orlando, Florida, in 1880. He died there a decade later.

Preceded by William Ezzard	Mayor of Atlanta; 1871–1872	Succeeded by John H. James
