= Mayor Maddox =

Mayor Maddox may refer to:

- Robert Maddox (1870–1965), mayor of Atlanta, Georgia, United States
- Scott Maddox (born 1968), mayor of Tallahassee, Florida, United States
- Walt Maddox (born 1972), mayor of Tuscaloosa, Alabama, United States
