= James L. Key =

American politician

James Lee Key (1867–1939) was a lawyer who served a total of four terms as the 45th and 48th Mayor of Atlanta.

== Biography ==
=== Early years ===
James L. Key was born in DeKalb County, Georgia on July 27, 1867, and educated in the public schools. He initially took up the practice of law in the city of Atlanta, in the 1890s.

=== Political career ===
By 1902, Key was an Atlanta city councilman representing the Sixth Ward. He ran for mayor in 1904 and 1918 first losing to, then defeating, James G. Woodward. He was easily re-elected in the 1920 election. During that second term, he established Atlanta's first City Planning Commission and issued bonds to build the Spring St. viaduct (completed December 20, 1923).

He did not run for re-election in 1922, and when he did run in 1924, he lost.

In 1930, Key was elected to a third term in the wake of the Atlanta graft ring scandal and early in that term he made public statements against Prohibition and the blue law bans of Sunday baseball games and Sunday movies. This precipitated a recall vote in 1932 that he would have lost if not for support from the black community. He was instrumental in getting Harry Hopkins and his WPA program to update the city sewer system and nearly a million dollars to remodel the Atlanta Municipal Auditorium and Cyclorama building. Key won a fourth term in 1934. Herbert T. Jenkins, Sr. who named a son after the mayor, was an aide and driver for Key. Jenkins later served as Chief of Police of the Atlanta Police Department for 26 years, from 1947 to 1973.

By the time he was campaigning for his fifth term, against William B. Hartsfield in 1936, the nearly 70-year-old Key was accused of spending only an hour a day at his office and lost a contentious race.

== Death and legacy ==
James L. Key died in 1939 after finally seeing the end of Prohibition.

The James L. Key Elementary School was named for the late mayor in 1963. Located at the intersection of Memorial Drive and Stovall Street, the school was closed in the 1990s.

The former James L. Key Golf Course, in Atlanta, was named in his honor. The golf course, along with many old Victorian-era homes in the Grant Park neighborhood were demolished in the late 1950s to make way for Interstate 20.

Preceded by Asa Candler	Mayor of Atlanta; 1919–1923	Succeeded by Walter A. Sims
Preceded by Isaac Newton Ragsdale	Mayor of Atlanta; 1931–1937	Succeeded by William B. Hartsfield
