= Edward Lee Sutton =

Former mayor of Clarkston, Georgia (born 1864)

Ed L. Sutton
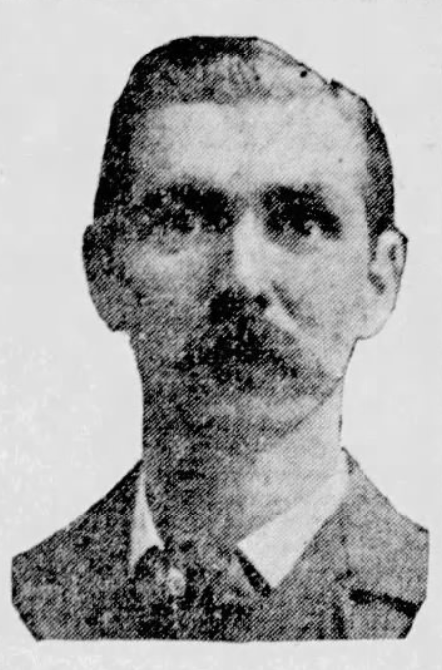
- Sutton in 1921

Personal details
- Born: Edward Lee Sutton; June 12, 1864 Lafayette, Georgia, U.S.
- Died: June 18, 1951 (aged 87) Clarkston, Georgia, U.S.
- Spouses: Fannie Saye Sutton (m. 1887); Jackie Bush (m. 1907)
- Children: 8

Ed L. Sutton (born 1864) was an American newspaper printer, union leader, and politician who served as mayor of Clarkston, Georgia, in 1900 and 1923. Sutton, described as one of Clarkston's best known residents, was a newspaper editor, printer, and journalist for over seven different newspapers, including The Atlanta Journal and The Clarkston Clarion.

== Early life ==
Sutton was born Edward Lee Sutton in Lafayette, Walker County, Georgia on June 12, 1864, to David Cass "D.C." Sutton and Drucilla A. Rhodes. Sutton had two older siblings, Evelyn "Eva" May and Claude Davis, born in 1858 and 1862 respectively, and six younger siblings. These younger siblings included Mollie Belle born in 1866, Anna born in 1868, Jessie Rosamond born in 1870, Cornelia "Nell" born in 1873, Eula born in 1876, and Kenneth Milner born in 1884.

By 1880, at the age of sixteen, Ed Sutton is listed as working in a printing office in Summerville, Chattanooga, Georgia in an US Census.

== Career ==
As an adult, Sutton continued his work as an editor, printer, and writer in newspapers. By 1885, Sutton had been working as the junior partner of the Sutton and Son publishing firm in Dahlonega, Georgia, and had been a printer and writer on the Signal newspaper.

Sutton briefly lived in Atlanta in 1885 after moving from Dahlonega before he married his first wife in 1887, and where the two lived in Valdosta, Georgia while Sutton worked with the Valdosta Times newspaper. The couple returned to Atlanta, living on 108 Stonewall Street, in 1889 wherein Sutton took editorial control of the Dekalb Chronicle a year later. At this time, Sutton became a member of the Atlanta Typographical Union, No. 48.

In 1892, Sutton and his family moved to Clarkston, Georgia where they would live until his passing in 1951. Despite moving, Sutton remained involved with several organizations located in Atlanta, while also involving himself with the newspapers and organizations in Clarkston.

Sutton wrote for several newspapers across his career, both in Atlanta and more locally in Clarkston. Between 1895 and 1899, Sutton was an editor for the Clarkston Clarion. By 1898, Sutton was working as an linotype operator for the Atlanta Journal and was still working for the paper in 1906. Sutton worked with the Atlanta Journal for approximately twenty-years. In 1904, Sutton was involved in the creation of the Atlanta Weekly Journal newspaper.

=== Kappa Sigma Fraternity ===
Sutton was initiated into the Kappa Sigma Fraternity in 1885 during a ceremony in Richmond, Virginia by supreme officers. Sutton was initiated despite not attending college, an honor that had only been previously given to one other person, Jefferson Davis. Sutton established the Rho chapter of Kappa Sigma in Dahlonega in the same year.

Ed L. Sutton was the district grand-master of the Kappa Sigma Fraternity for Georgia, Florida, and Alabama. In 1910, Sutton was invited to a fraternity banquet as one of the guests of honor. The other two guests of honor were two of the founders of the fraternity. In the same year, Sutton became the editor for the Kappa Sigma Fraternity magazine, The Caduceus. Before becoming the editor of The Caduceus, Sutton worked as editor of the Kappa Sigma Quarterly before 1890.

=== Labor and Union ===
Sutton was a respected officer in several different unions, and as part of his involvement extended aid to strikers. As a member of the Federation of Trades, Sutton was unanimously elected to be the editor of the Journal of Trade in 1901. After his election to editor of the Journal, Sutton was described as:

Mr. Sutton is one of the best known member of the Federation of Trades, and is respected and honored by all who know him.

In 1901, Sutton was also elected on the auditing and laws committees of the Allied Printing Trade Union. Sutton also served as chairman of the committee which created the constitution and by-laws of the Georgia Federation of Labor in 1902.

Similar to Sutton's description after his election to the role of editor of the Journal of Labor, Sutton was described in 1904 as one of the best known organized labor men in the state of Georgia by the Macon News.

==== Atlanta Typographical Union ====
Sutton was already a member of the Atlanta Typographical Union, the no.48 branch of the International Typographical Union, by 1889, and in 1895, Sutton was elected the president of the same branch of the union. Sutton served as president until 1986. By the following year, Sutton was serving as the secretary of the union, and in 1898, Sutton held the office of treasurer within the union and acted as the representative of the Atlanta branch at the forty-forth session of the International Typographical Union in New York. Sutton again held the office of the president of the Atlanta Typographical Union in 1899.

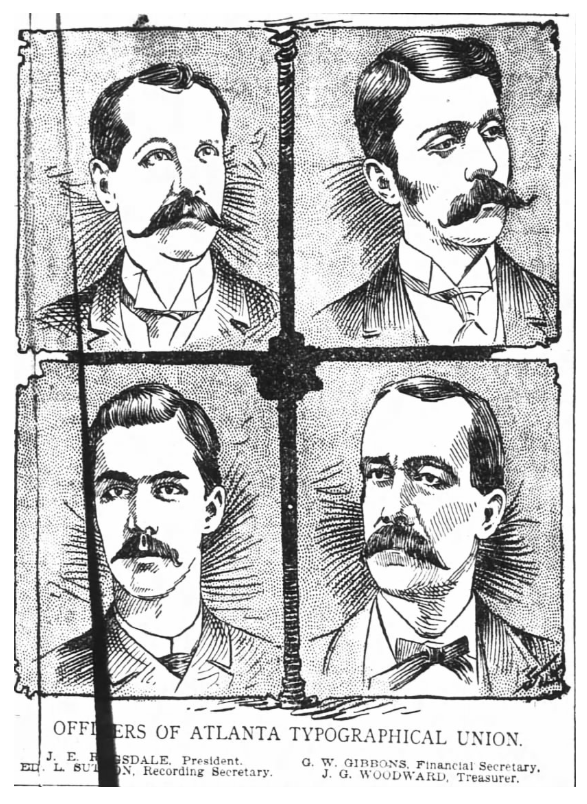
Ed. L. Sutton among officers as Recording Secretary

After a visit to the Union Printers Home in 1908, Sutton was described by his fellow International Union members as:

...a prominent and influential member...In his daily dealings with his fellow men he gathers many flowers of praise and appreciation and wins friendship from his fellow workers in the world's field of action.

In 1935, Sutton gave a speech on reminiscences as the oldest member of the Atlanta Typographical Union at their seventy-fifth anniversary dinner. Sutton was seventy-one at the time of the speech.

=== Forty Oaks Sutton Orpington Farm ===
While living in Clarkston, Sutton and his family lived in a two-story red brick and wood frame I-House, named Forty Oaks, and owned several acres of land fronting Market Street.

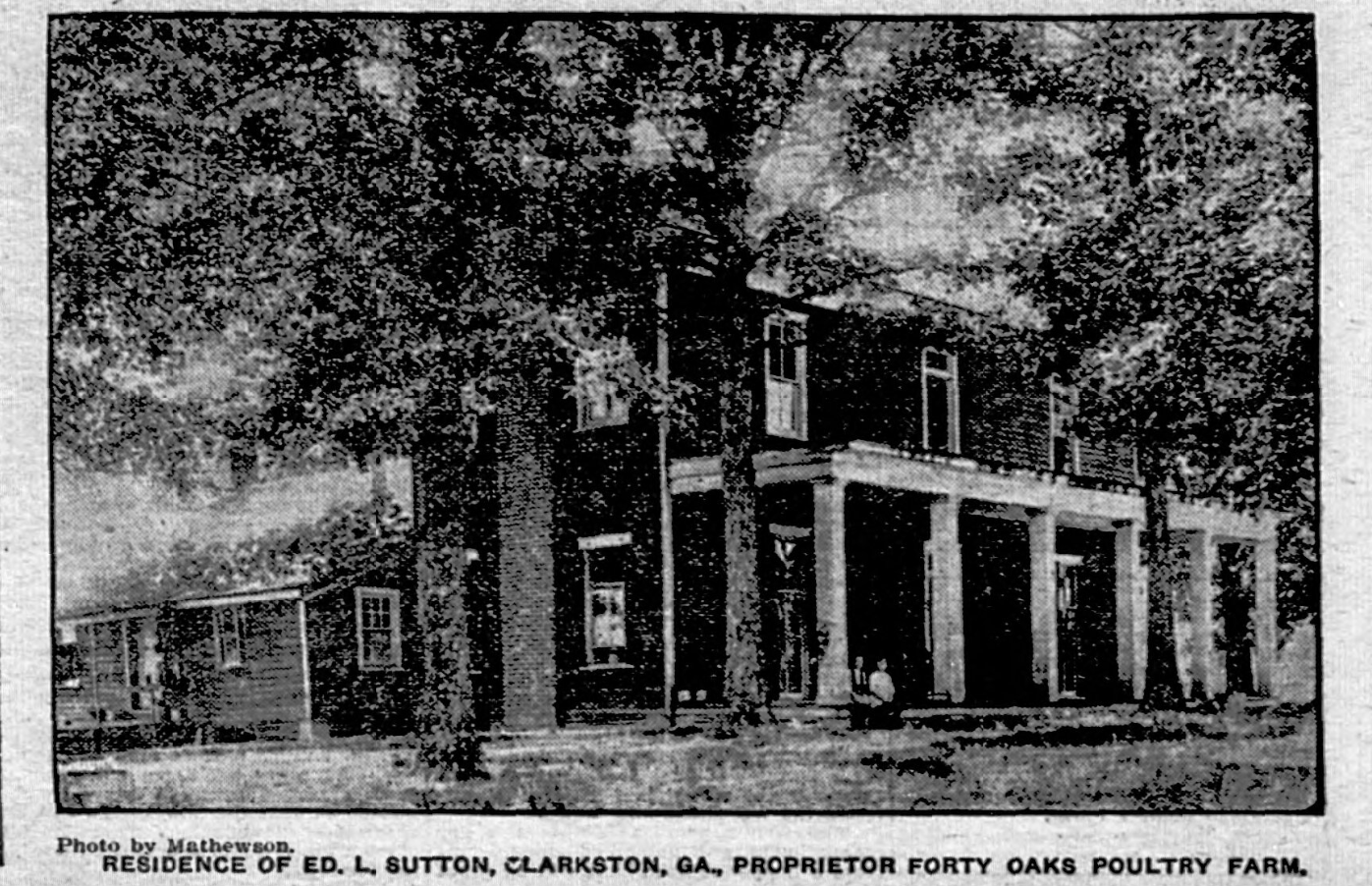
The Forty Oaks I-House in 1911 as seen in the Atlanta Georgian and News

As early as 1897, Sutton was selling chickens, eggs, and rabbits on the property and eventually named the farm, the Sutton Orpington Yard, after the breed of chicken they bred and sold. As owner of the farm, Sutton became a member of several different farming associations, such as the Atlanta Poultry, Pigeon, and Pet Stock association, the Dekalb County Poultry Breeder’s Association, and participated in many poultry exhibits. In 1900, Sutton created a local monthly Clarkston paper called the Southern Poultry and Pet Stock.

Sutton operated the farm under the name of "Sutton Orpington Farm" between approximately 1897 to 1912, after which there is no more mention of "Sutton Orpington Farm" in any Dekalb County or Atlanta newspapers. After this date, Sutton operated the farm under the name "Forty Oaks Farm" until approximately 1941. Between 1915 and 1940, the Forty Oaks Farm sold items such as milk, cream, and water lilies in various colors.

After Sutton's passing in 1951, the house was passed to his daughter Hazel who lived in the home with her younger sister, Winifred and older brother Harold. Hazel eventually deeded the house and half of the approximately 10.5-acre (4.2 ha) property to the Dekalb County Parks and Recreation department in 1971 with the stipulation that the property be turned into a nature park. The park created is known as the Forty Oaks Nature Preserve and is open seven days a week.

After Hazel's passing, Dekalb County used the house as the site of offices of Dekalb Natural Resources, the Atlanta Outward Bound Center, as well as the Global Growers which uses the land beside the house for the Clarkston International Gardens. Dekalb County sold the property to the City of Clarkston in 2017 and the house has been vacant since.

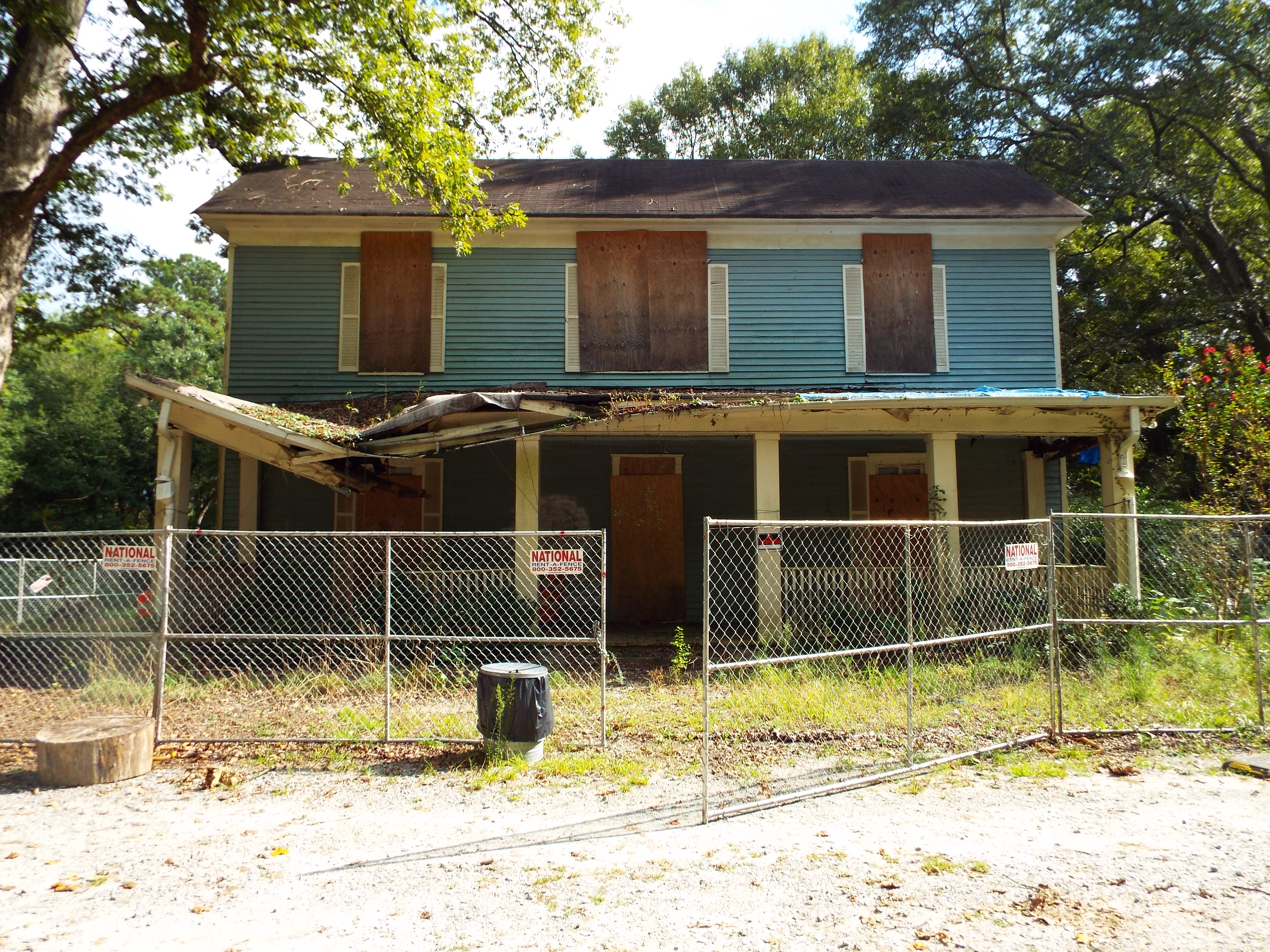
Forty Oaks in 2024

=== Politics ===
Ed. L. Sutton was a member of the People's Party (United States) and was a frequent advocate for various Atlanta city officials. In 1892, alongside several hundred petitioners, Sutton signed his support for the election of James G. Woodward for the position of Atlanta Mayor. Sutton attended both the Populist Party's convention in Griffin, Georgia in 1895 and the national convention in 1896 as a representative of Georgia's Fifth District.

Sutton voiced his support for the re-election of Governor Hoke Smith several times between the years of 1908 and 1910 and was a member of the Clarkston Hoke Smith Club. In 1909, by the appointment of Governor Smith, Sutton served as one of twenty delegates representing Georgia at the Southern States Convention to champion for reforms and uniform child labor legislation.

Sutton attended several national Democratic conventions leading into the year of 1908. In 1921, Sutton was a candidate for a seat within the Georgia House of Representatives from Dekalb County, but was not ultimately elected.

==== Mayor of Clarkston ====
Sutton served as the mayor of Clarkston twice, first in 1900 and again 1923. Before he was elected mayor, Sutton was elected as an alderman for the Clarkston City Council in 1898.

===== First term =====
Ed. L. Sutton served as the 5th mayor of Clarkston, preceded by W.C. Moore, R.D. Moore, Ed L. Waggoner, and Dr. C. S. Branyon. Sutton was elected January 8, 1900 and was still serving as mayor in 1901.

===== Second term =====
Sutton was re-elected mayor January 2, 1923.

Later in life in 1941, Sutton worked in the Clarkston city government as an assistant city clerk and as a tax collector.

=== Education ===
As a citizen of Clarkston, Sutton became involved in serving the city's education efforts. In 1905, Sutton was elected as part of the newly established Clarkston Board of Education by the city council in efforts to establish a school. In 1907, Sutton advertised a wanted position for a teacher for the Clarkston Grammar School through the Atlanta Journal. Sutton served, in 1925, as vice-president of the national and local associations of the American Federation of Teachers.

Sutton worked as a printer teacher at Clarkston's Technological High School for twenty-three years between 1915 and 1938 after helping establish the free school, the fourth of its kind in the state of Georgia.

== Personal life ==
=== Marriage and Family ===
Ed L. Sutton married Sarah Frances Saye, "Fannie Saye", on May 9, 1887. The Suttons had five children. Their first daughter, Marie, was born in 1888 and their first son, Howard Saye, was born in 1890. The Suttons second son, Harold lee, was born in 1892, and their second and third daughters, Hazel and Winifred, were born in 1894 and 1896 respectively.

Fannie Saye Sutton passed away June 11, 1900, after several months of illness, in their home in Clarkston, Georgia. Fannie Sutton was a bird lover and was the first president of the Ladies Auxiliary of the Atlanta Typographical Union. Fannie Sutton was interred in the Clarkston Cemetery, less than 0.5 miles (0.80 km) from their home.

Sutton married Jackie Bush nee Brown in 1907, who had three children from a previous marriage; Edna Clyde, Robert, and Colonel James Emerson. Jackie Sutton was a member of the Georgia Federation of Women's Clubs and even served as the president, incorporating the Clarkston's Civic Circle into the Federation in 1912. Jackie Sutton died on October 31, 1934, at the age of seventy after complications from a fall, and was also interred at the Clarkston Cemetery.

== Death ==
Ed L. Sutton passed away on June 18 of 1951 at the age of eighty-seven. At the time of his passing, he was survived by his sister Eula, his brother Kenneth, by seven of his eight children, and several grand-children and great grand-children. Sutton's funeral service was held at Clarkston's Methodist Church and he was interred in the Clarkston Cemetery with his wives.
