= Senator Collier =

Senator Collier may refer to:

- John J. Collier (1815–1892), Georgia State Senate
- Randolph Collier (1902–1983), California State Senate
