= Piedmont Exposition =

1887 exposition in Atlanta, Georgia

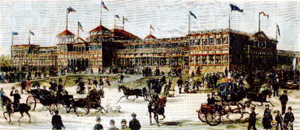
1887 Piedmont Exposition Main Building

The Piedmont Exposition of 1887 was the first exposition ever held in Piedmont Park in Atlanta, Georgia.

== Founding of the Piedmont Exposition Company ==
The Piedmont Exposition Company was founded in June 1887 by a group of men who met in the offices of the Atlanta Constitution. The company's chief purpose was to organize the Piedmont Exhibition for the purpose of exhibiting the natural resources of the Piedmont region, including Georgia, North Carolina, South Carolina, Tennessee, and Alabama.

Officers of the Piedmont Exhibition Company
Name	Office
Charles A. Collier	President
Henry W. Grady	Vice-President
Robert J. Lowry	Treasurer
Major W.H. Smyth	Secretary

=== Directors ===
- Oliver Clyde Fuller
- John Tyler Cooper
- G. M. Bain
- E. P. Chamberlin
- M. C. Kiser
- James W. English
- T. D. Meador
- John A. Fitten
- George Washington Adair Sr.
- C. D. Horn
- J. Kingsbury
- J. R. Wylie
- S. H. Phelan
- W. L. Peel
- W. W. Boyd
- T. L. Langston
- E. Rich
- P. H. Snook
- Rufus Brown Bullock
- Samuel M. Inman

=== Executive committee ===
- John Tyler Cooper
- J. R. Wylie
- S. H. Phelan
- C. D. Horn
- G. M. Bain
- E. P. Chamberlin
- Rufus Brown Bullock

== Planning ==
Planning of the exposition took only 104 days from the time the company was formed. The main plan called for the clearing out of a 189-acre (0.76 km^{2}) forest, an area now known as Piedmont Park, as well as the construction of several expensive buildings and a horse racetrack.,

The main building constructed for the Exposition was 570 feet (170 m) long, 126 feet (38 m) wide, and two stories high.

== Opening ==
The Piedmont Exposition of 1887, the first exposition ever held in Piedmont Park, opened on October 10. The first day opened with 20,000 visitors. Opening orations were performed by Governor Gordon and Hon. Samuel J. Randall of Pennsylvania. Randall opened the Exposition with a speech on the success of the resurrected post-civil war south. When his speech concluded, General Pierce M. B. Young and his men fired cannons to signal the opening of the events.

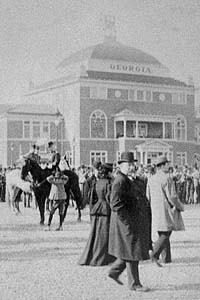
President Grover Cleveland walks past the Georgia Building at the 1887 Exposition.

Exhibitors showed off a variety of items including works of art, local raw materials like manganese marble, and wood work. Many prominent figures of the day were in attendance to see the displays. Governor David B. Hill of New York spoke at the event as well as President Grover Cleveland who attended with his young wife, Frances Folsom, on October 19. Over 50,000 people were in attendance for Cleveland's speech. The event closed on October 22 with a total attendance of about 200,000. When the exposition was over, civic leaders said that it had successfully expanded Atlanta's reputation as a place to visit and to conduct business.

The Exposition was also a chance for Atlanta to prove that it was ready to host the World's Fair. The executive committee of the fair was invited to attend the event under the bidding of Charles Reynolds, secretary of the Piedmont Exposition Company.

== See also ==
- International Cotton Exposition, 1881 in Atlanta
- Cotton States and International Exposition, 1895 in Atlanta
