= Thomas Gibbs =

Thomas Gibbs may refer to:

- Thomas Gibbs (mayor) (1798–1859), mayor of Atlanta
- Thomas Nicholson Gibbs (1821–1883), Canadian politician
- Thomas Van Renssalaer Gibbs (1855–1898), American politician
- Thomas Gibbs (British politician) for Stafford (UK Parliament constituency)

== See also ==
- Gibbs (surname)
- Thomas Gibb (disambiguation)
