= James Key =

James Key may refer to:

- Jimmy Key (born 1961), American baseball player
- James Key (Formula One) (born 1972), technical director and engineer in Formula One racing
- James L. Key (1867–1939), mayor of Atlanta
- James Key (artist), member of the Salón de la Plástica Mexicana
