= Cicero C. Hammock =

Confederate Army officer (c.1823–1890)

20th Mayor of Atlanta
- In office January 1873 – January 1874
- Preceded by: John H. James
- Succeeded by: S. B. Spencer

22nd Mayor of Atlanta
- In office January 1875 – January 1877
- Preceded by: S. B. Spencer
- Succeeded by: Nedom L. Angier

Personal details
- Born: 1823 Walton County, Georgia, U.S.
- Died: December 15, 1890 (aged 66–67)
- Party: Democratic Party

Military service
- Allegiance: Confederate States of America
- Branch/service: United States Army; Confederate States Army
- Rank: Officer
- Battles/wars: Mexican–American War (USA); American Civil War (CSA)

Cicero C. Hammock (c. 1823 – December 15, 1890) was the 20th and 22nd mayor of Atlanta, Georgia, during the Reconstruction era.

== Biography ==
Born in Walton County, Hammock served in the United States Army during the Mexican–American War, where he served with another future mayor, Captain Allison Nelson. After the war, he moved to Oglethorpe County, Georgia where he married, but soon after moved to Atlanta.

When the American Civil War began, he entered the Confederate States Army as a commissioned officer.

After the war, he returned to Atlanta and began working as a merchant with the firm Langston, Crane & Hammock and later he worked the real estate trade with a prominent office on Whitehall Street at Five Points.

During his first reconstruction-era term as mayor he inaugurated the city's waterworks system and his second term was the first two-year term after Atlanta adopted a new municipal charter.

He served as president of the city water commission from the mid-1880s until his death.

== See also ==
- List of mayors of Atlanta

== Notes ==
Preceded by John H. James	Mayor of Atlanta; January 1873 – January 1874	Succeeded by S.B. Spencer
Preceded by S.B. Spencer	Mayor of Atlanta; January 1875 – January 1877	Succeeded by Nedom L. Angier
