= William Hemphill =

Confederate Army officer (1842–1902)

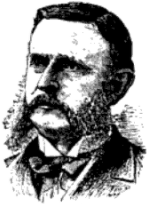

Mayor of Atlanta
- In office 1891–1893

Personal details
- Born: William Arnold Hemphill; May 5, 1842 Athens, Georgia, U.S.
- Died: August 17, 1902 (aged 60) Atlanta, Georgia, U.S.
- Resting place: Oakland Cemetery
- Spouse: Emma B. Luckie (m. 1871)
- Education: University of Georgia
- Occupation: Businessman, politician

William Arnold Hemphill (May 5, 1842 – August 17, 1902) was an American businessman and politician who served as Mayor of Atlanta from 1891 to 1893.

== Biography ==
=== Early years and education ===
Hemphill was born on May 5, 1842, in Athens, Georgia. He attended the University of Georgia (UGA) in Athens, where he was a member of the Phi Kappa Literary Society and earned a Bachelor of Arts in 1861 in engineering.

=== Business ventures ===
At the beginning of the Civil War Hemphill joined the Confederate Army, rising to the rank of colonel. He suffered a serious head wound at the Battle of Gettysburg. After the war, he moved to Atlanta in 1867, to teach. Within one year, Hemphill accepted an offer from Carey Wentworth Styles, to become the business manager and co-owner in a new joint venture with Styles and James Anderson. They had just purchased a small newspaper, the Atlanta Daily Opinion which they renamed. The Constitution was first published under that name on June 16, 1868. Styles quickly fell into financial difficulty, when he was unable to sell his interests in a struggling Albany, Georgia newspaper, The Albany News. With his inability to raise capital, Styles could not pay for his purchase of The Constitution. His ownership in the newspaper was assumed by Anderson and Hemphill. Hemphill, who became Anderson's son-in-law in the subsequent six months (having married Emma B. Luckie in 1871) was placed in full charge of the Atlanta publication. Hemphill continued in his position as business manager of the paper until 1901. Hemphill's business acumen helped get the fledgling newspaper on sound financial footing. In active competition with other Atlanta newspapers, Hemphill hired special trains (one engine and car) to deliver newspapers to the Macon marketplace. In 1870 Anderson sold his one half interest in the paper to Col. E. Y. Clarke. In 1876 Clarke sold his half interest in the paper to Evan Howell. Howell's family would come to own The Atlanta Constitution from 1902 to 1950.

In 1883, Hemphill was one of a group of investors who incorporated the Fulton County Street Railroad (horse cars), which was later electrified, and became famous for its Nine-Mile Circle route to what is now Virginia-Highland.

=== Political service ===
Hemphill was first elected to the position of (Atlanta) city councilman-at-large in 1887, the same year he began an unsuccessful banking career. The next few years he served as president of the board of education and in 1889 added alderman duties.

While still in control of the Constitution in 1890 he defeated a Black mayoral candidate known now only as "McKinley", by 1,773 votes, and took office the next year.

During his tenure the first building of what became Grady Memorial Hospital was built and a fresh-water pumping station was established on the Chattahoochee River replacing the need for various wells and cisterns (for fires). Part of the 55 acres (220,000 m^{2}) purchased for the associated reservoir included a newly built street named in his honor – Hemphill Ave.

After leaving office, Hemphill read about the Cotton Palace in Waco, Texas, and suggested that Atlanta could stimulate growth by hosting what would become the Cotton States and International Exposition of 1895. He later served as vice president and director of the Exposition.

== Death and legacy ==
Hemphill died in Atlanta on August 17, 1902, from injuries sustained in a fall. He is buried at Oakland Cemetery there.

Preceded by John Thomas Glenn	Mayor of Atlanta; January 1891 – January 1893	Succeeded by John B. Goodwin
