= Courtland Winn =

American politician, lawyer, and civic leader

Portrait of Winn from 1913

Courtland Simmons Winn (1863–1940) was a politician, lawyer, and civic leader from the State of Georgia.

Courtland S. Winn was born in Lawrenceville, Georgia, while the American Civil War raged. His father, Judge Samuel J. Winn, was then acting Colonel of the 13th regiment of Georgia Cavalry riding with Morgan's Raiders in Northeast Georgia and East Tennessee. His mother Sara Simmons was at home in Lawrenceville looking after her first-born. Both parents were from pioneer Gwinnett County families, Elisha Winn (1777–1842) and Adam Q. Simmons (1786–1863).

Courtland attended Emory College in Oxford, Georgia, and read law under his father. He was admitted to the bar at Monroe, Georgia. At the age of 21 in 1884, he was elected mayor of Lawrenceville and served two terms. In 1885 he married Fannie Thomas, daughter of Lovick Pierce Thomas II and Jemima Jane Peeples of Atlanta. The family moved to Atlanta in 1888.

In 1902 Winn was elected councilman of Ward 2 of Fulton County, Georgia. Also, he was the Fulton County administrator and vice-chairman of the Fulton County Board of Education. In 1910, Winn ran a successful campaign against James G. Woodward for Atlanta mayor. Winn served one term as mayor of Atlanta from 1911 to 1913 and was considered a progressive. During his term he increased teachers' salaries, eliminated many garbage dumps and oversaw the building of a garbage incinerator, had a bridge built over the railroad, eliminating a dangerous level crossing, opened a fire station in South Atlanta, and began the switch from horse-drawn to motor-driven firefighting equipment. Although he was to never enter politics again, Winn was a leading lawyer in the city for over fifty years and served as assistant city attorney for Atlanta.

Preceded by Robert Maddox	Mayor of Atlanta; January 1911 – January 1913	Succeeded by James G. Woodward
