= S. B. Spencer =

American politician (1827–1901)

Samuel Bacon Spencer

21st Mayor of Atlanta
- In office January 1874 – January 1875
- Preceded by: Cicero C. Hammock
- Succeeded by: Cicero C. Hammock

Personal details
- Born: Samuel Bacon Spencer; December 26, 1827 Liberty County, Georgia, US
- Died: October 16, 1901 (aged 73)
- Resting place: Oakland Cemetery; Atlanta, Georgia
- Party: Democratic Party
- Education: Oglethorpe University

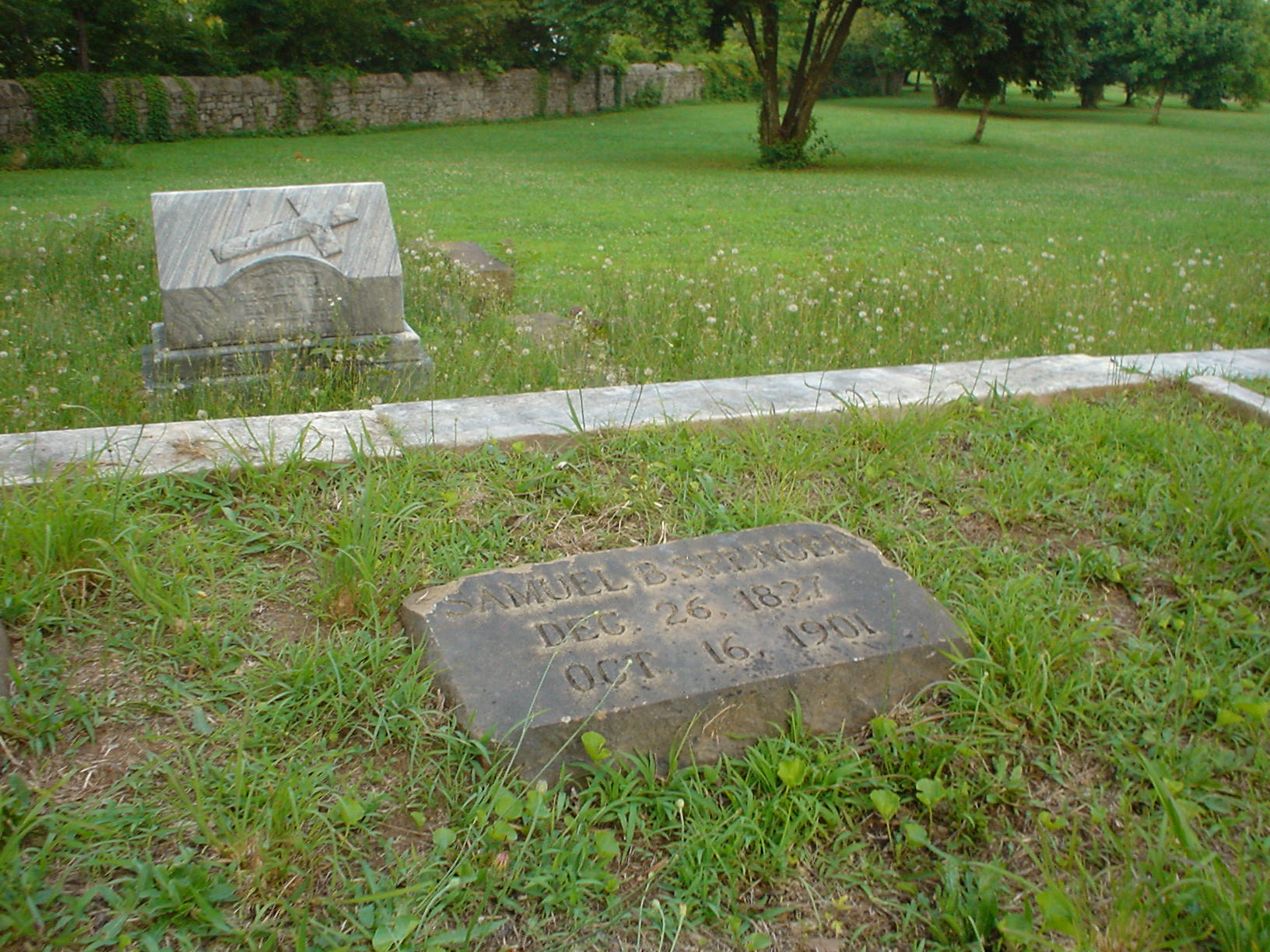
Gravesite at Oakland Cemetery

Samuel Bacon Spencer (December 26, 1827 – October 16, 1901) was the last mayor of Atlanta, Georgia to serve a one-year term.

Spencer was born on December 26, 1827. In 1848, he graduated from Oglethorpe University in Milledgeville, Georgia. On December 12, 1849, Spencer married the former Mary E. Baker. Between 1848 and 1854, he was a teacher in Greene County and Lumpkin Counties then turned to practicing law in Thomasville. A major in the Confederate Army during the American Civil War, Spencer moved to Atlanta in 1870 and continued practicing law. On December 3, 1873, as the unopposed Democratic candidate, he was elected mayor of Atlanta with 798 votes. After his one-term as mayor, Spencer moved to Savannah and taught school again at the Chatham Academy. In 1896, he returned to Atlanta. Spencer died on October 16, 1901, and is interred at Oakland Cemetery.

Preceded by Cicero C. Hammock	Mayor of Atlanta; January 1874 – January 1875	Succeeded by Cicero C. Hammock
