= Thomas Gibbs (mayor) =

American politician (1798-1859)

5th Mayor of Atlanta
- In office 1852–1853
- Preceded by: Jonathan Norcross
- Succeeded by: John Mims

Personal details
- Born: 1798
- Died: 1859
- Political party: Independent

Thomas Fortson Gibbs (1798–1859) was an American politician who served as the 5th mayor of Atlanta.

== Biography ==
Thomas Gibbs was born in 1798.

In John H. James' remembrances of this time, he describes the mayor as "Dr. Gibbs" but doesn't explain what sort of doctor.

Gibbs represented Elbert County, Georgia in the state house in 1837 and came to Atlanta after 1850. He ran and won as the city's fifth mayor for 1852 and ran for a second term January 17, 1853 but was defeated by John Mims.

Shortly after finishing his term, he left town, possibly to Memphis, Tennessee. He was married to Caroline Rebecca Harris (1807–1888) and they had eight children before his death.

== Death ==
Thomas Gibbs died in 1859.

== Notes ==
Preceded by Jonathan Norcross	Mayor of Atlanta; 1852– 1853	Succeeded by John F. Mims
