= Allison Nelson =

American politician (1822–1862)

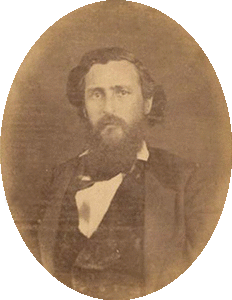

9th Mayor of Atlanta
- In office January 26, 1855 – July 6, 1855
- Preceded by: William M. Butt
- Succeeded by: John Glen (acting)

Personal details
- Born: March 11, 1822 Fayette County (present-day Fulton County), Georgia, U.S.
- Died: October 7, 1862 (aged 40) Prairie County (present-day Lonoke County), Arkansas, C.S.
- Cause of death: Typhus
- Resting place: Mount Holly Cemetery, Little Rock, Arkansas, U.S. 34°44′15.3″N 92°16′42.5″W
- Party: Democratic
- Spouse: Mary Nelson (m. 1840)

Military service
- Allegiance: United States; Confederate States of America
- Branch/service: United States Volunteers; Confederate States Army
- Years of service: 1846–1847 (USV); 1861–1862 (CSA)
- Rank: Captain (USV); Brigadier-General (CSA)
- Battles/wars: Mexican–American War; American Civil War

Allison Nelson (March 11, 1822 – October 7, 1862) was the ninth mayor of Atlanta, serving from January until July 1855, when he resigned from office. He died of disease in Prairie County (present-day Lonoke County), Arkansas, during the American Civil War.

== Early life ==
His father, John B. Nelson, was an early DeKalb County settler who operated Nelson's Ferry across the Chattahoochee River until murdered by John W. Davis in 1825.

== Political career ==
In a close election for mayor, Nelson, running as a Democrat, defeated the Know Nothing candidate, Ira O. McDaniel, but resigned in July when the city council reduced a fine he had levied on two young men for destroying city property, thus leaving John Glen as the acting mayor. Nelson left for Kansas during the border disputes, then moved to Meridian, Texas, where he was involved with Indian affairs, serving under Lawrence S. Ross, and in 1860 was elected to the legislature.

== Military service and death ==
During the Mexican–American War, Nelson served as a captain in the Kennesaw Rangers with another future mayor, Cicero C. Hammock, as well as the father of mayor John B. Goodwin – Williamson H. Goodwin. Nelson later served as a brigadier general under General Narciso López, in a failed attempt to free Cuba from Spain. He organized and served as colonel of the 10th Texas Infantry Regiment in the Confederate States Army. He was later promoted brigadier general but contracted typhus and died. He was buried in Mount Holly Cemetery, Little Rock, Arkansas.

== Legacy ==
Camp Nelson Confederate Cemetery (established 1897) in Lonoke County, Arkansas, is named after him.

== See also ==
- List of American Civil War generals

Political offices
Preceded by William M. Butt	Mayor of Atlanta; 1855	Succeeded by John Glen; Acting
