= Thomas Gibb (disambiguation) =

Thomas Gibb (1838–1894) was an English Liberal politician.

Thomas Gibb or Gybbe may also refer to:

- Thomas Augustus Gibb, co-founder of Gibb, Livingston & Co., a foreign trading firm in China
- Tommy Gibb (born 1944), footballer
- Thomas Gybbe, MP for Liskeard (UK Parliament constituency)

== See also ==
- Gibb (surname)
- Thomas Gibbs (disambiguation)
- Thomas (disambiguation)
- Gibb (disambiguation)
