= Charles A. Collier =

American banker, lawyer and politician (1848–1900)

- Portrait of Collier, published in 1896

Mayor of Atlanta
- In office January 1897 – January 1899
- Preceded by: Porter King
- Succeeded by: James G. Woodward

Personal details
- Born: Charles Augustus Collier; July 19, 1848 Atlanta, Georgia, U.S.
- Died: September 28, 1900 (aged 52) Atlanta, Georgia, U.S.
- Resting place: Oakland Cemetery
- Spouse: Susan Julia Eliza Rawson
- Children: 3, including Julia and John
- Parent: John J. Collier (father)
- Education: University of Georgia
- Occupation: Banker; lawyer; politician

Charles Augustus Collier (/ˈkɒliər/; July 19, 1848 – September 28, 1900) was an American banker, lawyer, and politician who served as Mayor of Atlanta, Georgia, from 1897 to 1899.

== Early life ==
Collier was born on July 19, 1848 in a Georgia village that would later be known as Gate City. He was the son of Judge John J. Collier and Henrietta E. Wilson. At the age of 18, he entered into the University of Georgia to study law where he joined Sigma Alpha Epsilon fraternity. He graduated from in 1869 with a degree in law and was admitted to the bar in 1871. Shortly after, he left the law profession and went into mercantile pursuits and banking.

== Career ==
=== Piedmont Exposition ===
He was elected to the Board of Aldermen of Atlanta in 1887 and 1888, similar to the Atlanta City Council today. In 1887, he was also the President of the Piedmont Exposition which bought 189 acres (0.76 km^{2}) of land to form Piedmont Park and the Gentleman's Driving Club. In just 104 days, Collier and the rest of the Company managed to build the structures and prepare the grounds for the Exposition held at the newly named Piedmont Park. President Grover Cleveland honored Atlanta with a visit to the Exposition with his new bride, Frances Folsom. Afterwards, Collier was named President of the Cotton States and International Exposition Company charged with planning the 1895 World's Fair which at the time was known as the Cotton States and International Exposition.

From 1892 to 1896 he was a member of the Fulton County Commission and with Hoke Smith provided funding for the Seaboard Air Line Railroad's construction through Georgia.

=== The 1895 Cotton States and International Exposition ===
Serious preparations for the Exposition began in 1894. On October 16, 1894, Collier and John Randolph Lewis wrote to Booker T. Washington making him the Chief Commissioner of the State of Alabama for the Exposition and charging him with creating an exhibit show casing the talents of African-Americans in Alabama.

During the Exposition, Collier named several days of honor. One of these days included Sigma Alpha Epsilon day, where he addressed fellow SAE fraternity brothers in the auditorium.

=== Mayor of Atlanta ===
Collier was elected as Mayor of Atlanta for the first time from 1897 to 1898. In 1899, Collier was elected mayor again, pro tem.

== Personal life and death ==
His wife, Suzie (died 1897) was the daughter of William A. Rawson. His son John Collier Sr. was commissioner of the Bureau of Indian Affairs from 1933 to 1945 and known for his effort to reform the BIA with the Indian New Deal. His daughter Julia Collier Harris was a writer and journalist who won a 1926 Pulitzer Prize, the first to go to a Georgian. He had another son named Charles Allen Collier.

Just a year after leaving office he was accidentally shot and killed while searching for a burglar in his backyard in the early morning of September 28, 1900. He was buried in Atlanta's Oakland Cemetery.

== Notes ==
Political offices
Preceded by Porter King	Mayor of Atlanta; January 1897 – January 1899	Succeeded by James G. Woodward
