= James W. English =

American politician (1837–1925)

James Warren English

Mayor of Atlanta
- In office January 1881 - January 1883

Personal details
- Born: October 28, 1837 Orleans Parish, Louisiana, U.S.
- Died: February 15, 1925 (aged 87) Atlanta, Georgia, U.S.
- Resting place: Oakland Cemetery, Atlanta, Georgia
- Profession: Banker, Politician

Military service
- Allegiance: United States; Confederate States
- Branch/service: Confederate States Army
- Years of service: 1861–1865
- Rank: Captain
- Unit: Spalding Grays, Company D, 2nd Battalion, Georgia Infantry
- Battles/wars: American Civil War

James Warren English (October 28, 1837 – February 15, 1925) was an American politician, bank president, and a staff officer during the American Civil War. He was a reconstruction Era mayor of Atlanta, Georgia, from 1881 until 1883.

== Life ==
English was born in Orleans Parish, Louisiana. His father died when he was 12 and his mother two years later. At the age of 15, he became an apprentice carriage-maker and worked at it industriously for four years while attending night school, when he moved to Griffin, Georgia. He married Emily Alexander and raised a family.

He enlisted in the Confederate States Army on April 20, 1861, and served in Virginia, rising to the rank of captain. On the night of April 7, 1865, in the company of Colonel Heman H. Perry, assistant adjutant general of Moxley Sorrel's brigade, English received the first written communication from Grant to Lee about a surrender, which happened soon after at Appomattox Court House.

Following his parole, English arrived in Atlanta on May 14, 1865, where he later became a banker. On December 1, 1880, he defeated developer H. I. Kimball to become mayor, taking office in January. He served as president of the American Trust and Banking Company (later rechartered as the Fourth National Bank) for thirty years. He also served twenty-four years on the board of directors of the Central of Georgia Railway Company. He was one of the incorporators of the 1883 Fulton County Street Railroad, which would later become famous for its Nine-Mile Circle route to what is now Virginia-Highland.

From 1871 until his death, he resided on Cone Street between Luckie and Poplar in the Fairlie-Poplar district. The home was torn down soon after he died; it was one of the last single-family homes in downtown Atlanta. Atlanta's English Avenue was named for J.W. English, Junior. James W. English, Sr., was one of the directors of the 1887 Piedmont Exposition.

English was one of Atlanta's most prominent citizens in the late 19th and early 20th centuries and was an ardent promoter of a New South, based on industry rather than on cotton. He quickly achieved success in business and politics. He served as a city council member, school board member, the police commissioner, the mayor of Atlanta, a bank president, and owner of several industrial enterprises.

== James English & convict leasing ==
While he was not descended from the antebellum era aristocracy and had never owned a slave before emancipation, by 1897 "his enterprises controlled 1,206 of Georgia's 2,881 convict laborers, engaged in brick making, cutting cross ties, lumbering, railroad construction, and turpentining." His "great personal wealth was inextricably linked to the enslavement of thousands of men."

English was most closely identified with the Chattahoochee Brick Company, which manufactured many of the bricks used to construct Atlanta's streets and some of its oldest neighborhoods. Although its methods were nearly identical to those used centuries before, it achieved high levels of productivity and vast profits by subjecting the convict laborers it leased from the city to brutal discipline and cruel deprivation. The Chattahoochee Brick Company was "the biggest and arguably most abusive buyer of forced laborers in Georgia." Before a legislative commission in 1908, former guards as well as workers reported that at the brickyard prisoners "were forced to work under unbearable circumstances, fed rotting and rancid food, housed in barracks rife with insects, driven with whips into the hottest and most intolerable areas of the plant, and continually required to work at a constant run in the heat of the ovens." English countered with a denial that he or any member of his family had ever directed "any act of cruelty" against any convict. In fact, he claimed, he had ordered his manager of operations to ensure that "workers were well fed, well shod, well clothed, and well cared for…." Although one former guard estimated that 200 to 300 laborers were flogged each month, English angrily protested, "If a warden in charge of those convicts ever committed an act of cruelty to them…and it had come to my knowledge, I would have had him indicted and prosecuted." Another witness testified that if English had come within a quarter mile of the plant, he would have heard the screams of men being beaten. English conceded that the work at the brickyard was so brutal that "not a class of [free] white labor in Georgia… could stand it a week."

English insisted he only used convict labor to do "work that a white man cannot and will not perform." He also employed convicts at a large sawmill, the Iron Belt Railroad and Mining Company, and the Durham Coal and Coke Company, which in 1908 owned leases on 430 convicts. Its operations included some particularly dangerous mine shafts, sections of which were filled waist-high with water. Workers were not provided with adequate timbers for bracing and cave-ins were frequent. Even when materials were provided, they often neglected to use them since they feared, if they took time to protect themselves, they would not complete their daily task and consequently be whipped by bosses who would sometimes embed their lashes with sand to increase the severity of the punishment.

English routinely violated the law by buying and selling the leases on convict laborers and thereby transferring them as if they were slaves. For example, in 1883 he purchased half of John T. Milner's Coalburg mine company and, "in an overtly illegal aspect of the transaction, a lot of one hundred black convicts." A witness before the legislative commission reported, "On Sunday afternoons, white men frequently met in the yard of the English brick factory to swap or buy black men, little changed from the slave markets of a half century earlier."

Preceded by William Lowndes Calhoun	Mayor of Atlanta; January 1881 – January 1883	Succeeded by John B. Goodwin
