= Walter Sims (Georgia politician) =

American politician (1880–1953)

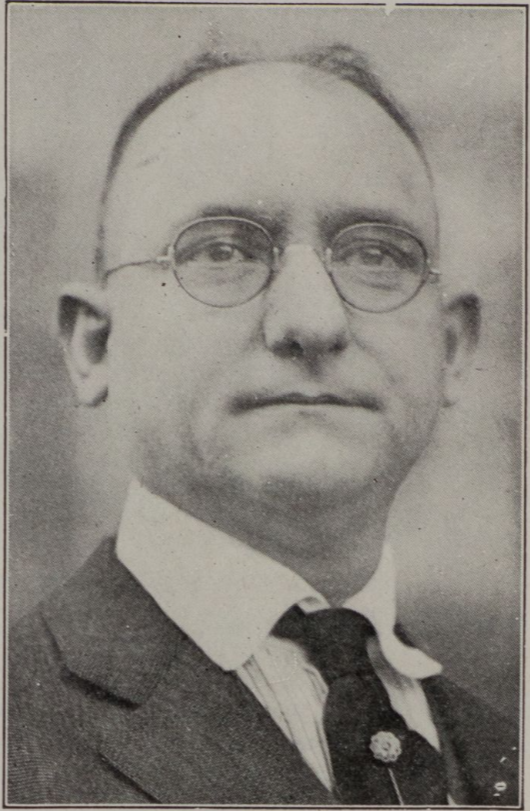
- Sims c. 1926

Mayor of Atlanta
- In office 1923–1927
- Preceded by: James L. Key
- Succeeded by: Isaac Newton Ragsdale

Personal details
- Born: Walter Arthur Sims; September 19, 1880 Dawson County, Georgia, U.S.
- Died: November 26, 1953 (aged 73) Atlanta, Georgia, U.S.
- Resting place: Arlington Memorial Park, Sandy Springs, Georgia, U.S.
- Spouse: Edna Belle Cheshire (m. 1903)
- Parent: John Newton Sims (father)
- Education: University of Georgia
- Profession: Politician

Walter Arthur Sims (September 19, 1880 – November 26, 1953) was an American politician.

== Biography ==
Born in Dawson County, Georgia, (near Ball Ground), he was the son of John Newton Sims (1848 – 1919). The family moved to Buckhead in 1892, and Walter was educated in public schools.

He graduated from the University of Georgia in 1899 and began a twenty-five-year law career in Atlanta. In 1903, he married Edna Belle Cheshire, daughter of Napoleon Cheshire (after whom Cheshire Bridge Road is named). He served as councilman of Atlanta's Ninth Ward.

He was twice elected mayor of Atlanta (both times defeating James L. Key) promising to clean up the police department after a gambling scandal which also included an anti-Catholic platform. During his tenure, the Spring Street Viaduct was completed, the north half of which still stands after the southern half was rebuilt in 1996. He also built two new schools, not from bonds but from general revenue, and he also paid off a $1,000,000 deficit left over from the previous Key administration.

In 1923, he proposed building an airport, sending alderman William Hartsfield to find a suitable location. Candler Field proved to be the best, and in 1925 the city leased it (the first five years were free) and the next year won a lucrative U.S. Mail route. In 1924, he opened the city's Municipal Market (today's Sweet Auburn Curb Market).

Sims died at his home in Atlanta on November 26, 1953. He is buried in Arlington Memorial Park, in Sandy Springs, Georgia.

Preceded by James L. Key	Mayor of Atlanta; 1923–1927	Succeeded by Isaac Newton Ragsdale
