= Porter King =

American politician (1857–1901)

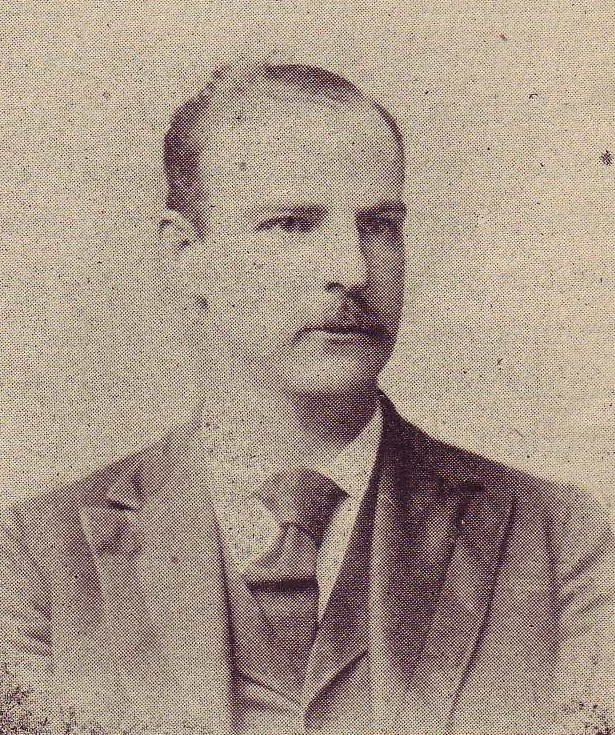
Porter King

Porter King (November 24, 1857 – October 24, 1901) was an American attorney and politician who is known primarily for having been Mayor of Atlanta, Georgia, 1895–1897.

Born in Marion, Alabama, he attended Howard College (now Samford University) and graduated in 1878. He studied law at University of Virginia in Charlottesville.

King moved in 1882 to Atlanta, the capital of Georgia, where he set up a law practice. He also entered politics, joining the Democratic Party. In 1889 he was elected to represent the Sixth Ward in the city council. In 1894 King was elected as the 34th Mayor of the city, serving one term from 1895 to 1897. Although reluctant to run for any other office, he was persuaded to run for the Georgia General Assembly in 1900, and won. King served one week but resigned and returned to private life. After leaving office, he died later that year from a "stroke of apoplexy" suffered at home.

== Notes ==
Preceded by John B. Goodwin	Mayor of Atlanta; January 1895 – January 1897	Succeeded by Charles A. Collier
