= Julia Collier Harris =

American writer and journalist

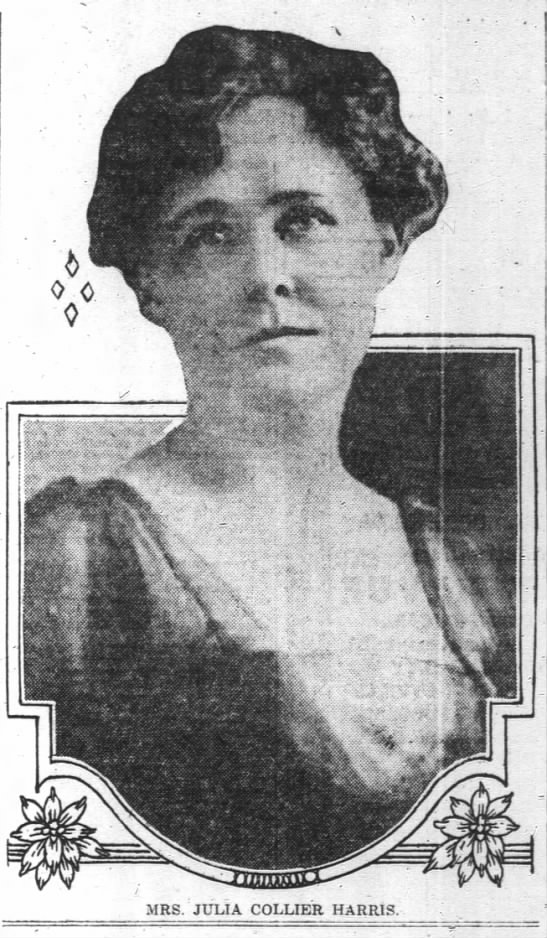
- Harris in 1919
- Born: Julia Florida Collier; November 11, 1875; Atlanta, Georgia, U.S.
- Died: January 21, 1967 (aged 91)
- Occupations: Writer and journalist
- Years active: 1911–1938
- Relatives: Charles A. Collier (father); Joel Chandler Harris (father-in-law); John Collier Sr. (brother)

Julia Collier Harris (November 11, 1875 – January 21, 1967) was an American writer and journalist. She wrote the earliest biography of Joel Chandler Harris, her husband's father. As owners and publishers of the Columbus Enquirer Sun she and her husband won the 1926 Pulitzer Prize for Public Service. She has been inducted into three Georgia halls of fame: Georgia Newspaper Hall of Fame, Georgia Writers Hall of Fame, and Georgia Women of Achievement.

== Early life ==
Julia Florida Collier was born in Atlanta on November 11, 1875, to Susan Rawson Collier and Charles A. Collier, once Atlanta's mayor. She graduated from Washington Seminary and then attended a finishing school. She studied art at Cowles Art School in Boston and planned to pursue it as a career. The death of her mother in March 1897 forced her to abandon her art career plans and return home to care for her five younger brothers and sisters. Her father died in 1900 under what she considered suspicious circumstances and left her legal guardianship of her brothers and sisters.

She married Julian LaRose Harris on October 26, 1897, in Atlanta. The son of Joel Chandler Harris, Julian was a journalist who had started with The Atlanta Constitution at age sixteen and later became their youngest managing editor. The couple had two sons, each of whom died in childhood in 1903 and 1904.

== Career ==
She began her own journalism career in 1911 at The Atlanta Constitution as well, writing on literary topics, the arts and club news. She was also state editor for the Georgia Federation of Women's Clubs.

Around this time her husband Julian was business manager for his father's Uncle Remus Magazine, but his father died in 1908, and the magazine folded in 1913. The couple moved to New York City, where Julian wrote for the New York Herald and Julia wrote for their Herald Syndicate under the pseudonym Constance Bine. She wrote a series of features for the Herald from Paris, and as a result she was one of only two women who were present at the signing of the Treaty of Versailles in June 1919. She wrote for the syndicate from 1916 to 1920.

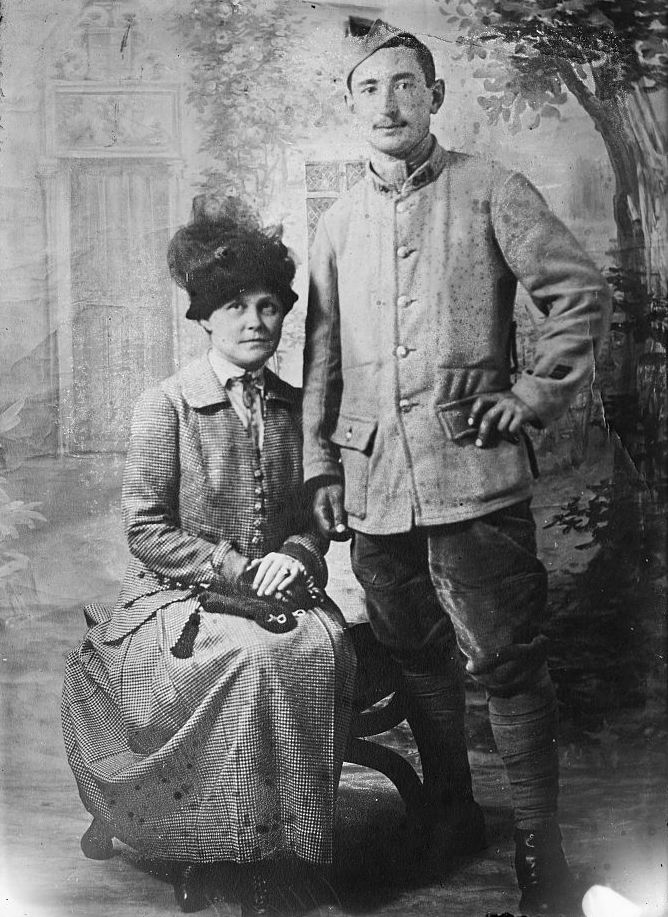
Harris with Marcel-Lenoir circa 1917

While she was writing for Herald, she worked on two books. Her first was a translation of Romanian folk tales.. Her second was the first biography of Joel Chandler Harris, and that 1918 book remains a primary resource for scholars of his work. She was also later instrumental in establishing a collection of his papers at Emory University's Robert W. Woodruff Library.

In 1920 the couple moved back to Georgia and pooled their money to purchase an interest in (and later, full ownership of) the Columbus newspaper Enquirer-Sun. The newspaper broke ground by identifying politicians who were secretly members of the Ku Klux Klan and by publishing news of the black community.

Harris wrote a series of articles that helped defeat anti-evolution bills in the Georgia General Assembly in 1924 and 1925. She identified herself as a theistic evolutionist. Other topics she editorialized included campaigns against convict leasing and lynching. Between 1922 and 1929 she wrote hundreds of editorials for the paper, many of which were reprinted in other newspapers.

As a result of this work, the Columbus Enquirer-Sun won the 1926 Pulitzer Prize for Public Service. It was the first Pulitzer Prize to be awarded to people from Georgia. Julian accepted the honor for his wife and said of her, "She is not only vice president of the Enquirer Sun Company, but a fearless associate editor, unyielding in the face of injustice of any kind, and a constant inspiration."

Harris, her husband, and Mildred Seydell were the only journalists from Georgia who reported in person from the Scopes Trial in 1925. Harris' husband covered the daily progress of the trial, while she wrote in-depth pieces and editorials that explained evolution. Her husband said that "Julia is the better writer."

Their outspoken editorials made them many enemies in Columbus, which caused advertising revenue to plummet. This forced them to sell the newspaper in 1929.

A good newspaper woman must continue to study as well as to observe, and must prepare herself continuously against every emergency. My own all-round equipment as a writer has enabled me to take advantage of almost every opportunity that has come my way.

— Julia Collier Harris, quoted in Concerning The Fourth Estate, 1942

Her husband returned to The Atlanta Constitution, and she worked on her third book, a collection of her father-in-law's essays. In 1935 her husband became the executive editor of the Chattanooga Times, and she wrote features, editorials, book reviews. and a weekly column for that paper.

Poor health and bouts of depression forced her to retire in 1938, but she continued to mentor young journalists until her death. In 1942 the Harrises returned to Atlanta, where Julian was a correspondent for The New York Times until he retired in 1945.

Outside of her career, Harris was active in the Association of Southern Women for the Prevention of Lynching and the League of Women Voters. She was also a member of the Daughters of the American Revolution as well as the Georgia Federation of Women's Clubs, in which she held several offices.

== Death and legacy ==
She spent her later years in a nursing home, where she continued to write. She died in 1967 and was buried in the Rawson family vault at Atlanta's historic Oakland Cemetery.

She has been posthumously inducted into three different Georgia halls of fame. In 1996 she was inducted into the Georgia Newspaper Hall of Fame. In 1998 she was inducted into the Georgia Women of Achievement. In 2019 she was inducted into the Georgia Writers Hall of Fame.

Her papers are held at Smith College, and her husband's papers are held at Emory University.

== Books ==
- Ispirescu, Petre (1917). The Foundling Prince & Other Tales. Translated by Harris, Julia Collier; Ipcar, Rea. Boston & New York: Houghton Mifflin Co. OCLC 560304297.
- Harris, Julia Collier (1918). The Life and Letters of Joel Chandler Harris. Boston and New York: Houghton Mifflin company. OCLC 1031594442.
- Harris, Julia Collier, ed. (1931). Joel Chandler Harris, Editor and Essayist. Chapel Hill: Univ. of North Carolina Press. OCLC 272364.
