= James E. Williams (Atlanta mayor) =

American politician

Mayor of Atlanta
- In office 1866–1868
- Preceded by: James Calhoun
- Succeeded by: William Hulsey

Personal details
- Born: James Etheldred Williams; January 16, 1826 Grainger County, Tennessee, U.S.
- Died: Atlanta, Georgia, U.S. April 10, 1900 (aged 74)
- Resting place: Oakland Cemetery; Atlanta, Georgia
- Political party: Democratic

James Etheldred Williams (January 16, 1826 – April 10, 1900) was an American politician who served as a two-term mayor of Atlanta, Georgia, during Reconstruction.

Born in Grainger County, Tennessee, the second of ten children, he began working in Knoxville in the post office and, with his cousins, operated a line of steamboats on the Tennessee River from that city to Decatur, Alabama.

He moved to Atlanta in October 1851, and with his Tennessee connections was able to set up a prosperous warehousing business. He built a larger warehouse on Decatur Street in Atlanta with an upper floor that was used as the popular theater of the time, the Atheneum. He ran both until their destruction in 1864 during the burning of Atlanta in the Civil War. Williams was not physically fit for active service during the Civil War. but after his warehouse was destroyed, he became a fireman under Captain Samuel B. Sherwood.

Politically, he was "Always a Democrat, strongly opposed to Whiggery, Know-Nothingism and Abolitionism" and was a staunch secessionist. He served on the Atlanta city council before and after the war, and served as two terms as mayor (the second was extended to 1868 by order of the commandant of the post of Atlanta, Major General John Pope).

He then began independent trading, but retired from active business in 1880. He died in 1900.

Preceded by James M. Calhoun	Mayor of Atlanta; 1866–1868	Succeeded by William Hulsey
