= Walthall Robertson Joyner =

Mayor of Atlanta, Georgia, United States

W. R. "Cap" Joyner
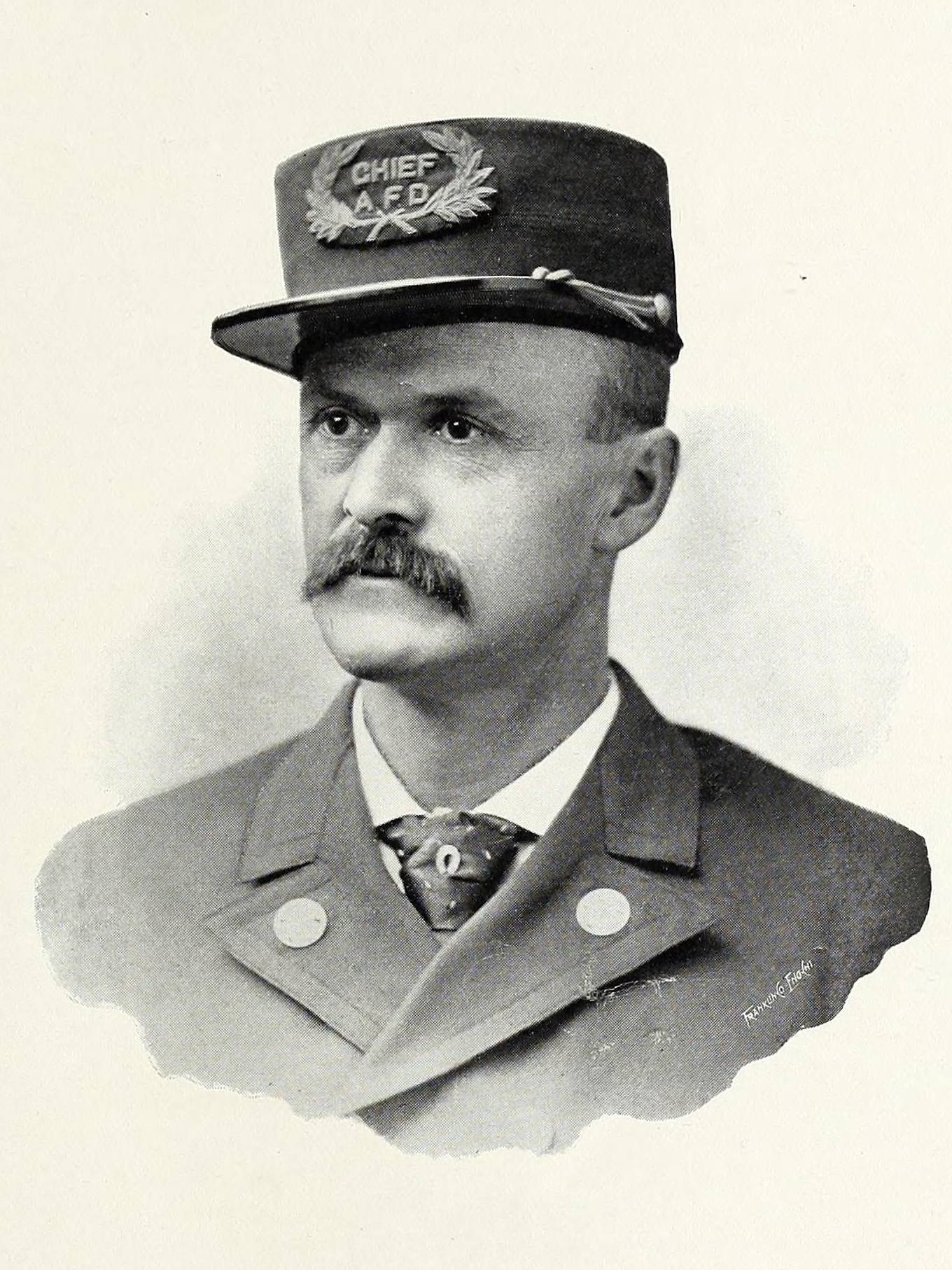

38th Mayor of Atlanta
- In office January 1907 – January 1909
- Preceded by: James G. Woodward
- Succeeded by: Robert F. Maddox

Walthall Robertson "Cap" Joyner (June 30, 1854 – January 5, 1925) was the 40th Mayor of Atlanta, Georgia.

Born in Cobb County, Georgia, he moved to Atlanta at a young age and began as a volunteer firefighter at the age of 15. In 1872, at the age of 18, he was made assistant chief, the first of many promotions. He was fire chief of Atlanta from 1885 to 1906 until becoming mayor and the first Southerner President of the International Association of Fire Chiefs.

He was Fire Chief when the Markham House burned to the ground.

He defeated Thomas Goodwin (incumbent mayor James G. Woodward didn't run) in 1907 and under his leadership a memorial was made of the Wren's Nest after Joel Chandler Harris's death. During the Great Atlanta fire of 1917, Joyner was the State Fire Marshal of Georgia and led the firefighters that came to assist from outlying cities.

== Notes ==
Preceded by Matthew Ryan	Fire Chief of Atlanta; July 1, 1885 – 1906	Succeeded by William B. Cummings
Preceded by James G. Woodward	Mayor of Atlanta; January 1907 – January 1909	Succeeded by Robert F. Maddox
