= William Lowndes Calhoun =

American politician (1837–1908)

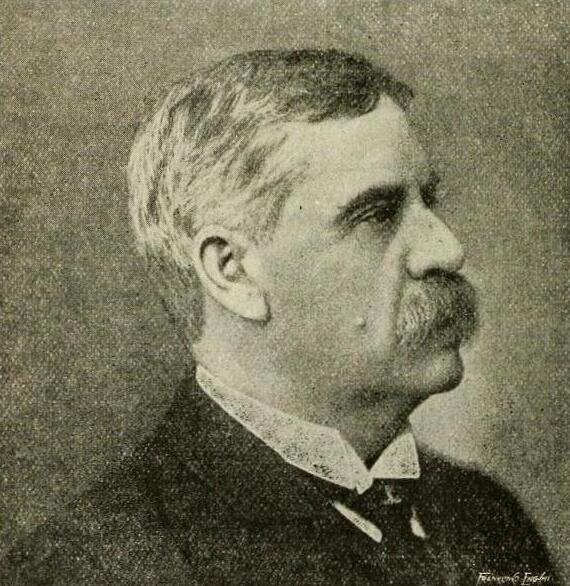
- Calhoun in a 1902 publication

Mayor of Atlanta
- In office January 1879 – January 1881
- Preceded by: Nedom L. Angier
- Succeeded by: James W. English

Personal details
- Born: November 23, 1837 Decatur, Georgia, U.S.
- Died: November 16, 1908 (aged 70) Atlanta, Georgia, U.S.
- Resting place: Oakland Cemetery
- Spouse: Mary J. Oliver (m. 1857; died 1905)
- Children: 6
- Parent: James Calhoun (father)
- Occupation: Politician; lawyer; judge

Military service
- Allegiance: Confederate States
- Branch/service: Confederate States Army
- Years of service: 1862-1865
- Rank: Captain
- Unit: 42nd Georgia Infantry; Army of Tennessee
- Battles/wars: American Civil War: Vicksburg Campaign; Atlanta campaign

William Lowndes Calhoun (November 23, 1837 – November 16, 1908) was an American attorney and politician from the state of Georgia who served as the 26th Mayor of Atlanta.

== Early life ==
William Lowndes Calhoun was born on November 23, 1837, in Decatur, Georgia, to Emma Eliza (née Dabney) and James Calhoun. His father became mayor of Atlanta. In 1852, he moved with his family to Atlanta. At the age of 16, he began reading law at his father's firm. He passed the bar in 1857.

== Career ==
Calhoun then practiced law with his father. In March 1862, Calhoun enlisted in the Confederate States Army with company K of 42nd Georgia Infantry Regiment. He became first lieutenant and was later promoted to captain. He served in Knoxville, Tennessee, and at the Siege of Vicksburg. At Vicksburg, his regiment was surrendered by John C. Pemberton on July 4, 1863. He also served during the Battle of Baker's Creek and the retreat of Joseph E. Johnston. He was wounded at Battle of Resaca. After his recovery, he served in the Army of Tennessee under General Hood in the Franklin–Nashville campaign. He served to the end of the war.

Calhoun served in the Georgia General Assembly from 1872 to 1876. He was a member of the judiciary, corporations, and finance committees. In 1879, Calhoun was elected mayor of Atlanta. During his tenure, the city's floating debt of US$600,000 went to a rate of six percent. He also saw the start of the street paving system. In 1881, he was elected as judge of the Court of Ordinary of Fulton County. He served in that role until 1897.

Following the war, Calhoun continued practicing with his father until his father's death in 1875. He continued practicing alone until 1881. From 1889 to 1894, he was president of the Confederate Veterans' Association of Fulton County, increasing the membership from 15 to 700. He was president of the Gordon Monument Association to build the Equestrian statue of John Brown Gordon in Atlanta. He served in the state militia for three years.

== Personal life ==
Calhoun married Mary J. Oliver of southern Georgia in 1857. They had six children, Emma, Mary, Nettie, Lowndes, W. D., and J. M. His wife died in 1905.

Calhoun died on November 16, 1908, at his home on Washington Street in Atlanta. He was buried in Oakland Cemetery.

Preceded by Nedom L. Angier	Mayor of Atlanta; January 1879 – January 1881	Succeeded by James W. English
