= John Glen (Atlanta mayor) =

American politician

John Glen (1809–1895) was born in Laurens, South Carolina, and moved to Decatur, Georgia, in 1826, where he worked as a clerk in the Superior Court of DeKalb County. He moved to Atlanta in 1850 to work for the Georgia Railroad, which he did for 41 years. He acted as mayor of that city, taking over when Allison Nelson suddenly resigned in 1855.

After the American Civil War, he moved to Kirkwood, which was nearer to his in-laws' properties. He married Eliza Shumate in the 1830s, and they had 10 children.

Preceded by Allison Nelson	Mayor of Atlanta; July 20, 1855 – 1856	Succeeded by William Ezzard
