= William Hulsey =

American politician

William Henry Hulsey (October 1, 1838 – May 17, 1909) was an American attorney, soldier, and politician who served as the 18th Mayor of Atlanta, Georgia. He was an officer in the Confederate States Army during the American Civil War.

== Biography ==
Hulsey was born in DeKalb County, Georgia, and passed the Georgia bar in 1859, but didn't practice much until after the Civil War.

With Georgia's secession, Hulsey enlisted in April 1861 as a private in the "State Guards," which soon became Company F of the 6th Georgia Infantry. That unit saw no action before Hulsey left them in early 1862, when he returned home and was elected major of the newly raised 42nd Georgia Infantry on March 20. He subsequently fought in Tazewell, Tennessee, Cumberland Gap, the Kentucky Campaign, and the Vicksburg Campaign, where he and his regiment, attached at the time to Brig. Gen. Seth Barton's brigade, were surrendered by General John C. Pemberton.

After his exchange, Major Hulsey resumed active field duty. He commanded the 42nd Georgia during the Battle of Missionary Ridge. Back in Georgia during the Atlanta campaign, he fought from Dalton to Resaca in May 1864, where he was injured. After his recovery, he fought in the Battle of Atlanta in July and was promoted to lieutenant colonel, the rank he held for the rest of the Civil War.

He was a Democrat and served one term as Mayor of Atlanta, during which time he founded the Atlanta Public School System. He served two terms in the Georgia General Assembly from Fulton County. He died on May 17, 1909, and was buried at Oakland Cemetery.

| Preceded by James E. Williams | Mayor of Atlanta; 1869–1870 | Succeeded by William Ezzard |
