= Nedom L. Angier =

American politician (1814–1882)

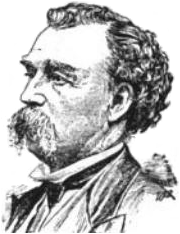

23rd Mayor of Atlanta
- In office January 1877 – January 1879
- Preceded by: Cicero C. Hammock
- Succeeded by: William Lowndes Calhoun

Personal details
- Born: November 10, 1814 Acworth, New Hampshire, U.S.
- Died: February 3, 1882 (aged 67) Atlanta, Georgia, U.S.
- Resting place: Oakland Cemetery
- Party: Republican
- Education: New York University

Nedom L. Angier (November 10, 1814 – February 3, 1882) was the Mayor of Atlanta from 1877 to 1879. To date, he is the last Republican to hold that office.

== Biography ==
Born in Acworth, New Hampshire, he came to Georgia in 1839 and taught school for four years in Coweta County. He then completed his medical training at New York University before arriving as an early Atlanta settler in 1847 where he practiced that trade and a few others.

He spent the year 1850 gold-hunting in California, but returned to Atlanta amassing real estate wealth before the American Civil War, including a health spring near the current intersection of today's Ponce de Leon and Glen Iris.

With Georgia's secession in 1861, many pro-Unionists fled Atlanta. Heeding advice from U.S. Secretary of State William H. Seward and with help from William Markham, Angier was able to escape the South with his family via Cuba to New York City. His son, Alton Angier (1855–1913) also escaped, but only by crossing enemy lines and describing Atlanta's fortifications to Union officials in Tennessee. During the occupation of Atlanta, his home on Mitchell St. facing the Atlanta City Hall was occupied by Union Major General John M. Schofield.

After the war, Angier was rewarded for his loyalty with an appointment as U.S. collector of revenue and was elected state treasurer in 1868, where he battled fellow Republican Rufus B. Bullock over public funds. The political fight parlayed into the mayoralship of Atlanta. Angier was mayor during U.S. President Rutherford B. Hayes' visit of September 22, 1877, which was part of a goodwill tour to continue post-Reconstruction reconciliation with the former Confederate States of America.

Later, Angier was a high school principal.

Angier died at his home in Atlanta on February 3, 1882. He was buried at Oakland Cemetery and remembered by Angier Avenue and Angier Springs Road in Atlanta's Old Fourth Ward.

Preceded by Cicero C. Hammock	Mayor of Atlanta; January 1877 – January 1879	Succeeded by William Lowndes Calhoun
