= George Hillyer =

American politician (1835–1927)

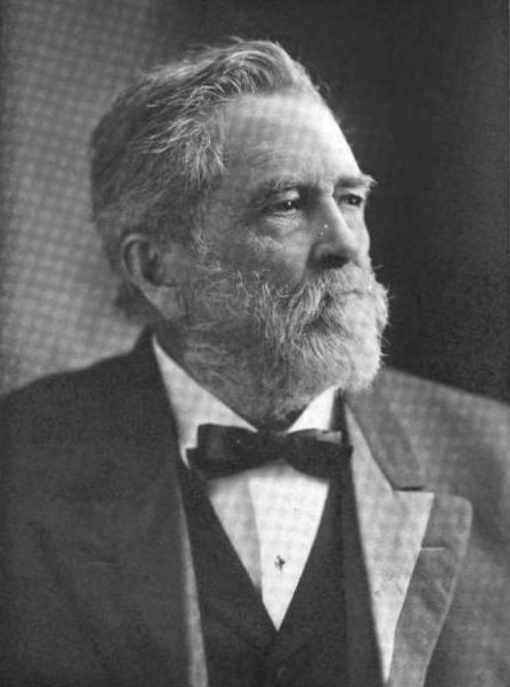

Judge of the Fulton County Superior Court
- In office 1877–1883

Member of the Georgia State Senate from the 35th District
- In office 1871–1875

Member of the Georgia House of Representatives from Walton County
- In office 1857–1859

Mayor of Atlanta
- In office January 1885 – January 1887

Personal details
- Born: March 17, 1835 Athens, Georgia, U.S.
- Died: October 22, 1927 (aged 92) Atlanta, Georgia, U.S.
- Party: Democratic
- Spouse: Ellen Emily Cooley
- Relations: Ethel Hillyer Harris (niece)
- Children: eight children (three died in infancy)
- Education: Mercer University
- Occupation: Lawyer and Railroad Executive

Military service
- Allegiance: Confederate States of America
- Branch/service: Confederate States Army
- Years of service: 1861–65 (CSA)
- Rank: Major (CSA)
- Unit: Company C of the Ninth Regiment of Georgia Volunteers (CSA)
- Battles/wars: American Civil War: Battle of Fredericksburg; Gettysburg campaign; Peninsula Campaign; Atlanta campaign

George Hillyer (March 17, 1835 – October 2, 1927) was an American politician, serving as the 29th Mayor of Atlanta, Georgia, as well as a state representative and senator. He was also an officer in the Confederate States Army during the American Civil War.

== Biography ==
=== Early years and education ===
Hillyer was born in Athens, Georgia, one of eight children of Judge Junius Hillyer, a United States Congressman and solicitor of the U.S. Treasury, and Jane Selina Watkins. He graduated from Mercer University in July 1854, "securing honors in all branches of study". He then studied law under the supervision of his father, Judge Hillyer, in Monroe, Georgia, and in 1855 was admitted to the state bar. For the first two years of his legal career he practiced with his father, then set up a partnership with the Hon. Hope Hull until the start of the Civil War.

=== Georgia House of Representatives ===
At the age of 21, Hillyer ran for a seat in the state legislature, and was elected to the Georgia House of Representatives in 1856. He was sworn in the following January and served one two-year term. Hillyer then served as Clerk of the Georgia House of Representatives from 1859 to 1860. In 1860 he was selected as a delegate to the Democratic National Convention in Chicago, Illinois, where he supported the nomination of Howell Cobb for President.

=== Military service ===
With the outbreak of the Civil War, Hillyer raised a Walton County company known as the "Hillyer Rifles" in the late spring of 1861. The men were mustered into the Confederate Army on June 13, with Hillyer elected as the captain of what became Company C of the 9th Georgia Volunteer Infantry. He and the regiment were sent by train to Virginia and assigned to the newly created brigade of George "Tige" Anderson in the newly organized Army of Northern Virginia. Hillyer saw extensive fighting at Fredericksburg (briefly commanding the regiment) and Gettysburg, where he fought at the famed "Wheatfield" on July 2, 1863. The 9th Georgia lost half of its 340 men in the fight, and Hillyer's company suffered considerable losses. With all the senior officers wounded or killed, Hillyer assumed command of the regiment for the rest of the Gettysburg campaign, and wrote the official report of the 9th Georgia's service in the battle. Union General Joseph Hooker remarked that Confederate Captain Hillyer was "a most able, efficient & gallant officer".

The Wheatfield

The afternoon of July 2, 1863, left the “Wheatfield” and nearby woods strewn with more than 4,000 dead and wounded Union and Confederate soldiers. Thousands of troops fought in this area and veterans compared it to a whirlpool--a stream of eddies and tides that flowed around the 19-20 acres of wheat owned by farmer George Rose; it is said to have changed hands six times.

— Patricia A. Kaufmann

Hillyer resigned his captain's commission in November 1863 to become an auditor for the Western & Atlantic Railroad at the request of Governor Joseph E. Brown, who preferred a military man for the role as the railroad was the main supply route for General Joseph E. Johnston's Confederate army. Early in 1864, Hillyer organized the State Road Battalion (consisting mainly of railroad men) and he was placed in command of the defenses of the railroad with the rank of major. Seeing action against cavalry raiders during the Atlanta campaign, Hillyer performed well, but the railroad eventually fell to the Union Army. He and his remaining men surrendered to Federal officers on May 10, 1865.

=== Legal career and political office ===
After the war, Hillyer set a law practice in Atlanta with his brother, Henry. The two worked together for a number of years before George eventually joined the law firm of Hillyer, Alexander & Lambdin.

In June 1867, at the age of 32, Hillyer married Ellen Emily Cooley, and together they undertook to raise a family, eventually having 8 children (three of whom died in infancy).

Starting in 1870, he served four years as a Democrat in the Georgia Senate, representing the 35th District, which included Fulton, Clayton, and Cobb counties. He served as the Georgia delegate to the United States Centennial Commission that planned and organized the country's Centennial celebrations and the International Exhibition of 1876. He was appointed to the Fulton County Superior Court by Governor Alfred H. Colquitt, serving from 1877 to 1883.

=== The city of Atlanta ===
In 1885 Hillyer served one term as mayor of Atlanta, during which time he became an expert on municipal water services, publishing several related articles and serving on the Atlanta Water Commission for many years. Hillyer played an active role in the establishment of the Atlanta University System to provide higher education to the freed slaves. He was on the board of trustees for Spelman Baptist Seminary, as well as Vice-Chairman for the Georgia Railroad Commission.

=== Death and legacy ===
He died at the age of 92 and was buried in Atlanta's Oakland Cemetery.

== Writings ==
My Gettysburg Battle Experiences (edited by Gregory A. Coco), 2005, Thomas Publications (Gettysburg, PA)

Preceded by John B. Goodwin	Mayor of Atlanta; January 1885 – January 1887	Succeeded by John Tyler Cooper
