= Isaac Newton Ragsdale =

American politician

Mayor Ragsdale (left) poses with Charles Lindbergh (center) and Georgia Governor L. G. Hardman (right) at Candler Field on October 11, 1927

Isaac Newton Ragsdale (1859–1937) was mayor of Atlanta from 1927 to 1931. He moved to Atlanta in 1880 from Dallas, Georgia. He lived for many years in Oakland City and served as mayor there in 1908 before it was annexed into Atlanta. He was in the livestock business and from 1925 to 1926 he served as a Fulton County Commissioner. His time as its mayor came during a 1929 change to the city charter giving mayors a four-year term which he was the first to serve. In 1929, the Atlanta graft ring scandal broke, and Ragsdale did not run for re-election in 1931. He died in 1937.

Preceded by Walter Sims	Mayor of Atlanta; 1927–1931	Succeeded by James L. Key
