= Luther Glenn =

American politician

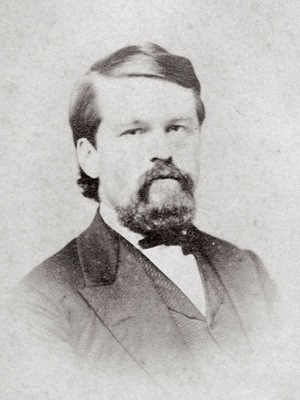
Luther Glenn

Luther Judson Glenn (November 26, 1818 – June 9, 1886) was a Georgia lawyer, politician, Confederate officer during the American Civil War, and antebellum Mayor of Atlanta.

He attended the University of Georgia where he was a member of the Phi Kappa Literary Society and graduated in 1841. He was married to Mildred Lewis Cobb, a younger sister of Generals Howell and Thomas Reade Rootes Cobb (Howell Cobb later served as Governor of Georgia). An attorney, Glenn represented Henry County in the state legislature as a Democrat before arriving in Atlanta in 1851. Six years later, he was elected mayor and served two consecutive one-year terms. He was the first mayor to appoint regular committees in council for the various functions of city governance: Fire, Streets, Finance, and so on.

In March 1861, the Southern states that had seceded from the Union appointed special commissioners to travel to those other slaveholding Southern states that had yet to secede. Glenn served as the commissioner from Georgia to the Missouri Secession Convention, publicly reading Georgia's Articles of Secession and trying to persuade Missouri politicians to vote to join Georgia in seceding from the Union.

During the Civil War, he served first as the company commander of C Company, Cobb's Legion (Infantry), and subsequently as lieutenant colonel of Cobb's Legion. He finished the war as the commander of the Post of Atlanta. In that position, he surrendered the remaining Confederate troops of Atlanta to Col. Beroth B. Eggleston of the 1st Ohio Cavalry on May 3, 1865.

He remained in Atlanta until his death and was buried in Oconee Hill Cemetery in Athens, Georgia.

Of his sons, Howell Cobb Glenn, a lawyer, died young in 1890 and John Thomas Glenn, also an attorney, served as Mayor of Atlanta from 1889 to 1891.

== See also ==
- List of signers of the Georgia Ordinance of Secession

Preceded by William Ezzard	Mayor of Atlanta; 1858–1860	Succeeded by William Ezzard
