= List of mayors of Atlanta =

Mayor of Atlanta
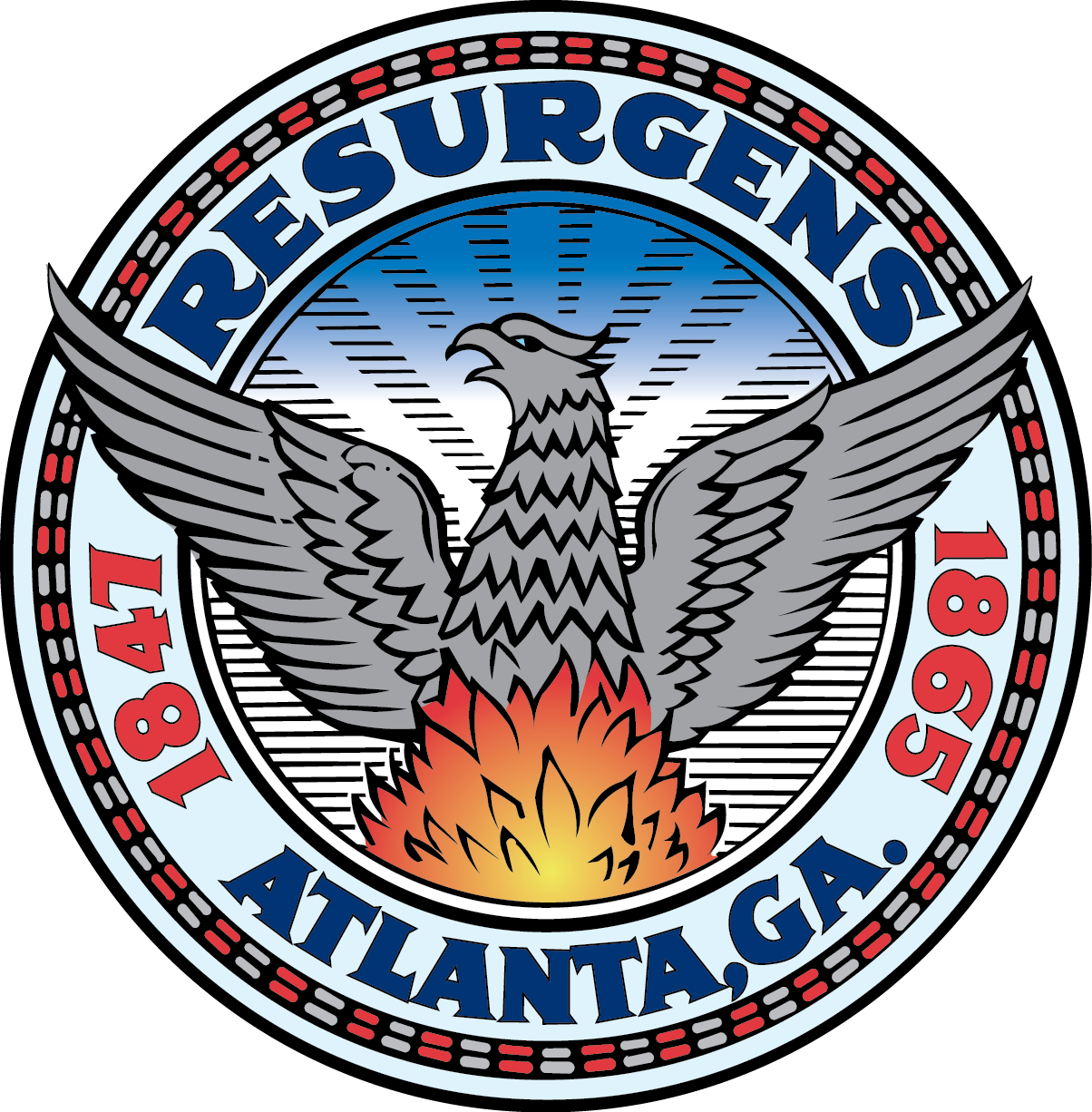
- Seal of City of Atlanta

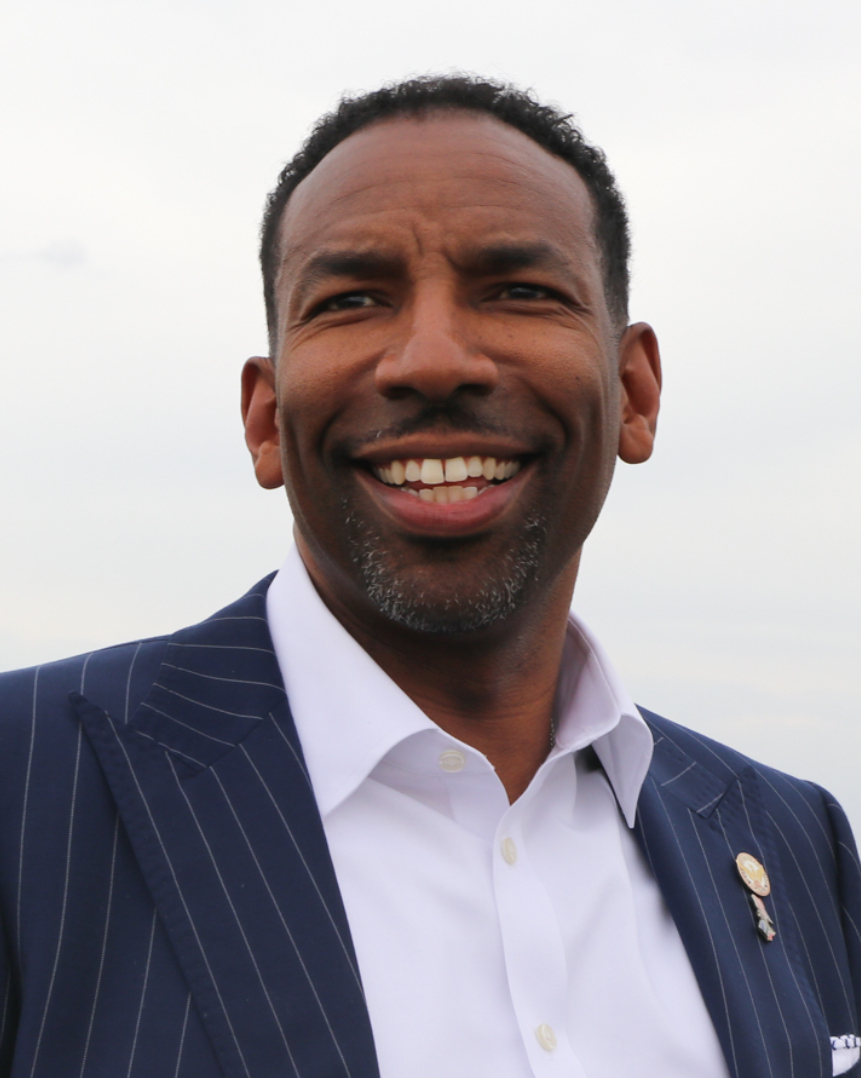
- Incumbent; Andre Dickens since January 3, 2022
- Term length: 4 years, renewable once
- Inaugural holder: Moses Formwalt
- Formation: 1848
- Salary: $147,500
- Website: www.atlantaga.gov

This is a list of mayors of Atlanta, Georgia. The mayor is the highest elected official in Atlanta. Since its incorporation in 1847, the city has had 61 mayors. The current mayor is Andre Dickens, who was elected in 2021 and took office in January 2022.

The term of office was one year until Cicero C. Hammock's second term (1875–1877), when a new city charter changed it to two years. The term was changed to four years in 1929, giving Isaac N. Ragsdale the modern stay in office.

Though a political party is listed where known, the mayoral election is officially non-partisan, so candidates do not represent their party when elected. Since 1879, all mayors of Atlanta have been members of the Democratic Party.

== List of mayors ==
See the mayors of Atlanta category for an alphabetical list by surname.

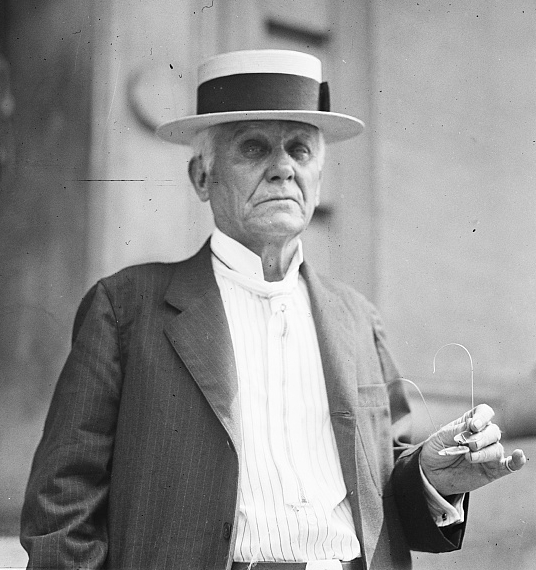
Mayor Asa Griggs Candler (1917–1919). Candler incorporated The Coca-Cola Company in 1892.

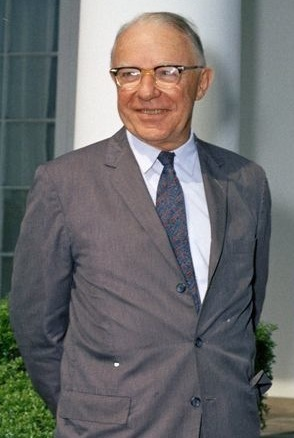
Mayor William B. Hartsfield (1937–1941; 1942–62). He was the longest serving Atlanta mayor, running the city politics for ca. 30 years.

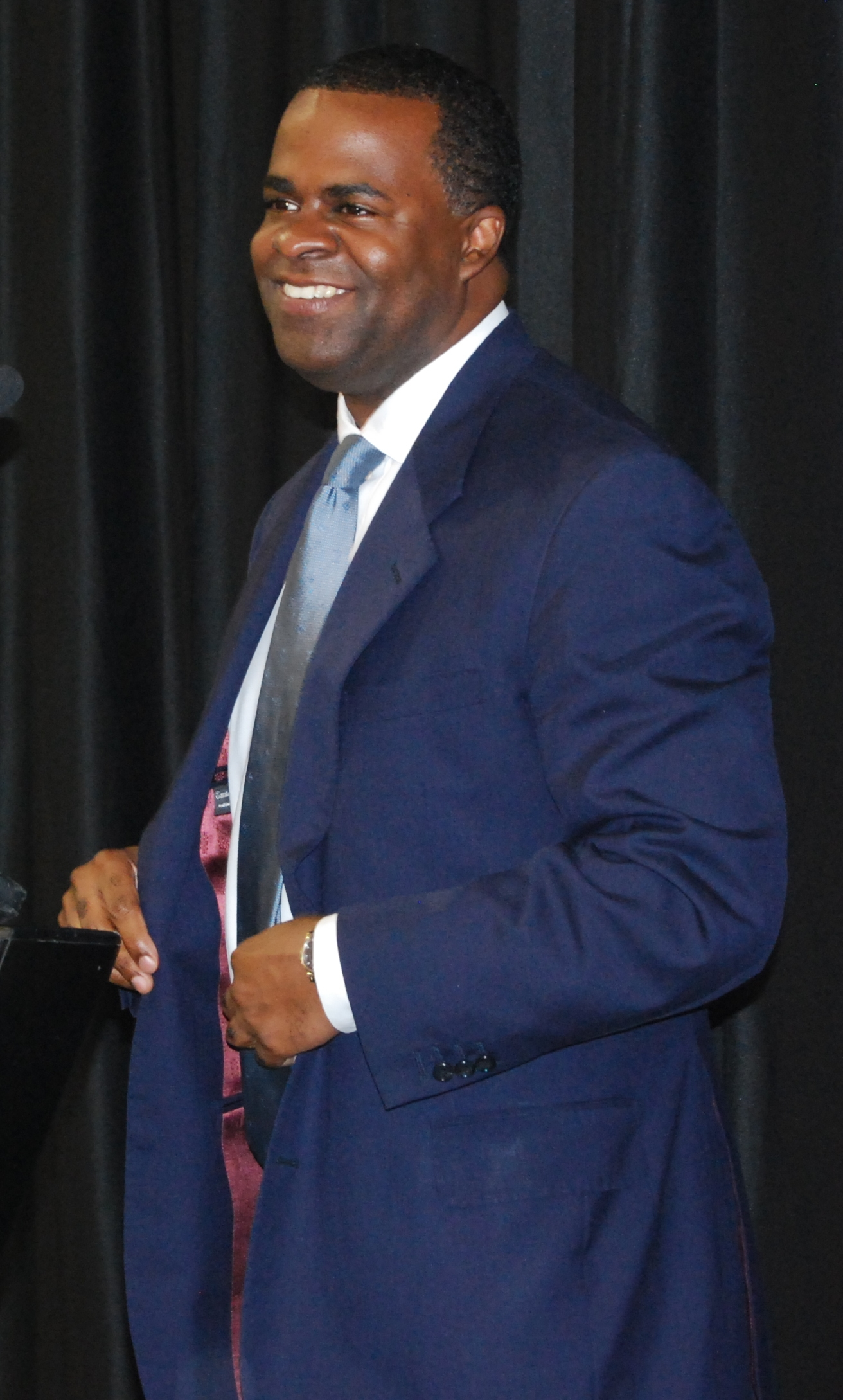
Mayor Kasim Reed (2010–2018)

No.	Mayor	Took office	Left office	Tenure	Election	Party
1	Moses Formwalt (1820–1852)	January 1848	January 17, 1849	1 year	1848	Free and Rowdy
2	Benjamin Bomar (1816–1868)	January 17, 1849	January 23, 1850	1 year, 6 days	1849	Free and Rowdy
3	Willis Buell (c. 1790–1851)	January 23, 1850	January 1851	1 year	1850	Free and Rowdy
4	Jonathan Norcross (1808–1898)	January 1851	January 1852	1 year	1851	Moral
5	Thomas Gibbs (1798–1859)	January 1852	January 17, 1853	1 year	1852	Moral
6	John Mims (1815–1856)	January 17, 1853	October 1853 (Note: Mims resigned due to illness.)	9 months	Jan. 1853	Independent
7	William Markham (1811–1890)	October 1853	January 1854	3 months	Oct. 1853	Independent
8	William Butt (c. 1805–1888)	January 1854	January 26, 1855	1 year	1854	Independent
9	Allison Nelson (1822–1862)	January 26, 1855	July 6, 1855 (Note: Nelson resigned after the city council reduced a fine he levied on two young men for destroying city property.)	161 days	1855	Democratic
10	John Glen (1809–1895); Acting	July 6, 1855	January 1856	6 months	–	Democratic
11	William Ezzard (1799–1887); 1st time	January 1856	January 1858	2 years	1856	Democratic
11	William Ezzard (1799–1887); 1st time	January 1856	January 1858	2 years	1857	Democratic
12	Luther Glenn (1818–1886)	January 1858	January 1860	2 years	1858	Democratic
12	Luther Glenn (1818–1886)	January 1858	January 1860	2 years	1859	Democratic
13	William Ezzard (1799–1887); 2nd time	January 1860	January 1861	1 year	1860	Democratic
14	Jared Whitaker (1818–1884)	January 1861	December 13, 1861 (Note: Whitaker resigned when he was appointed by Governor Joseph E. Brown as commissary general of Georgia's state troops during the Civil War.)	11 months	1861	Southern Democratic
15	Thomas Lowe (1812–1875); Acting	December 13, 1861	January 1862	1 month	–	Southern Democratic
16	James Calhoun (1811–1875)	January 1862	January 1866	4 years	1862	Southern Democratic
16	James Calhoun (1811–1875)	January 1862	January 1866	4 years	1863	Southern Democratic
16	James Calhoun (1811–1875)	January 1862	January 1866	4 years	1864	Southern Democratic
16	James Calhoun (1811–1875)	January 1862	January 1866	4 years	1865	Southern Democratic
17	James E. Williams (1826–1900)	January 1866	January 1869	3 years	1866	Democratic
17	James E. Williams (1826–1900)	January 1866	January 1869	3 years	1867 (Note: Williams's second term as mayor was extended to 1868 by order of the commandant of the post of Atlanta, Major General John Pope.)	Democratic
18	William Hulsey (1838–1909)	January 1869	January 1870	1 year	1869	Democratic
19	William Ezzard (1799–1887); 3rd time	January 1870	January 1871	1 year	1870	Democratic
20	Dennis Hammond (1819–1891)	January 1871	January 1872	1 year	1871	Republican
21	John H. James (1830–1917)	January 1872	January 1873	1 year	1872	Democratic
22	Cicero C. Hammock (c. 1823–1890); 1st time	January 1873	January 1874	1 year	1873	Democratic
23	S. B. Spencer (1827–1901)	January 1874	January 1875	1 year	1874	Democratic
24	Cicero C. Hammock (c. 1823–1890); 2nd time	January 1875	January 1877	2 years	1875	Democratic
25	Nedom L. Angier (1814–1882)	January 1877	January 1879	2 years	1877	Republican
26	William Lowndes Calhoun (1837–1908)	January 1879	January 1881	2 years	1879	Democratic
27	James W. English (1837–1925)	January 1881	January 1883	2 years	1881	Democratic
28	John B. Goodwin (1850–1921); 1st time	January 1883	January 1885	2 years	1883	Democratic
29	George Hillyer (1835–1927)	January 1885	January 1887	2 years	1885	Democratic
30	John Tyler Cooper (1844–1912)	January 1887	January 1889	2 years	1887	Democratic
31	John Thomas Glenn (1844–1899)	January 1889	January 1891	2 years	1889	Democratic
32	William Hemphill (1842–1902)	January 1891	January 1893	2 years	1891	Democratic
33	John B. Goodwin (1850–1921); 2nd time	January 1893	January 1895	2 years	1893	Democratic
34	Porter King (1857–1901)	January 1895	January 1897	2 years	1895	Democratic
35	Charles A. Collier (1848–1900)	January 1897	January 1899	2 years	1897	Democratic
36	James G. Woodward (1845–1923); 1st time	January 1899	January 1901	2 years	1899	Democratic
37	Livingston Mims (1833–1906)	January 1901	January 1903	2 years	1901	Democratic
38	Evan Howell (1839–1905)	January 1903	January 1905	2 years	1903	Democratic
39	James G. Woodward (1845–1923); 2nd time	January 1905	January 1907	2 years	1905	Democratic
40	Walthall Robertson Joyner (1854–1925)	January 1907	January 1909	2 years	1907	Democratic
41	Robert Maddox (1870–1965)	January 1909	January 1911	2 years	1909	Democratic
42	Courtland Winn (1863–1940)	January 1911	January 1913	2 years	1911	Democratic
43	James G. Woodward (1845–1923); 3rd time	January 1913	January 1917	4 years	1913	Democratic
43	James G. Woodward (1845–1923); 3rd time	January 1913	January 1917	4 years	1915	Democratic
44	Asa Griggs Candler (1851–1929)	January 1917	January 1919	2 years	1917	Democratic
45	James L. Key (1867–1939); 1st time	January 1919	January 1923	4 years	1919	Democratic
45	James L. Key (1867–1939); 1st time	January 1919	January 1923	4 years	1921	Democratic
46	Walter Sims (1880–1953)	January 1923	January 1927	4 years	1923	Democratic
46	Walter Sims (1880–1953)	January 1923	January 1927	4 years	1925	Democratic
47	Isaac Newton Ragsdale (1859–1937)	January 1927	January 1931	4 years	1927	Democratic
48	James L. Key (1867–1939); 2nd time	January 1931	January 1937	6 years	1931	Democratic
48	James L. Key (1867–1939); 2nd time	January 1931	January 1937	6 years	1932 recall (Note: Key survived a recall election.)	Democratic
48	James L. Key (1867–1939); 2nd time	January 1931	January 1937	6 years	1935	Democratic
49	William B. Hartsfield (1890–1971); 1st time	January 1937	January 1941	4 years	1937	Democratic
50	Roy LeCraw (1895–1985)	January 1941	May 1942 (Note: LeCraw resigned to join the United States Army.)	1 year	1941	Democratic
–	George B. Lyle (1884–1948); Acting	May 1942	May 1942	1 month	–	Democratic
51	William B. Hartsfield (1890–1971); 2nd time	May 1942	January 1962	20 years	1942 special	Democratic
51	William B. Hartsfield (1890–1971); 2nd time	May 1942	January 1962	20 years	1945	Democratic
51	William B. Hartsfield (1890–1971); 2nd time	May 1942	January 1962	20 years	1949	Democratic
51	William B. Hartsfield (1890–1971); 2nd time	May 1942	January 1962	20 years	1953	Democratic
51	William B. Hartsfield (1890–1971); 2nd time	May 1942	January 1962	20 years	1957	Democratic
52	Ivan Allen Jr. (1911–2003)	January 1962	January 1970	8 years	1961	Democratic
52	Ivan Allen Jr. (1911–2003)	January 1962	January 1970	8 years	1965	Democratic
53	Sam Massell (1927–2022)	January 1970	January 1974	4 years	1969	Democratic
54	Maynard Jackson (1938–2003); 1st time	January 1974	January 4, 1982	8 years	1973	Democratic
54	Maynard Jackson (1938–2003); 1st time	January 1974	January 4, 1982	8 years	1977	Democratic
55	Andrew Young (born 1932)	January 4, 1982	January 2, 1990	7 years, 363 days	1981	Democratic
55	Andrew Young (born 1932)	January 4, 1982	January 2, 1990	7 years, 363 days	1985	Democratic
56	Maynard Jackson (1938–2003); 2nd time	January 2, 1990	January 3, 1994	4 years, 1 day	1989	Democratic
57	Bill Campbell (born 1953/4)	January 3, 1994	January 7, 2002	8 years, 4 days	1993	Democratic
57	Bill Campbell (born 1953/4)	January 3, 1994	January 7, 2002	8 years, 4 days	1997	Democratic
58	Shirley Franklin (born 1945)	January 7, 2002	January 3, 2010	7 years, 361 days	2001	Democratic
58	Shirley Franklin (born 1945)	January 7, 2002	January 3, 2010	7 years, 361 days	2005	Democratic
59	Kasim Reed (born 1969)	January 3, 2010	January 2, 2018	7 years, 364 days	2009	Democratic
59	Kasim Reed (born 1969)	January 3, 2010	January 2, 2018	7 years, 364 days	2013	Democratic
60	Keisha Lance Bottoms (born 1970)	January 2, 2018	January 3, 2022	4 years, 1 day	2017	Democratic
61	Andre Dickens (born 1974)	January 3, 2022	Incumbent (Note: Dickens's second term began on January 5, 2026, and is set to expire on January 7, 2030; he will be term-limited.)	4 years, 311 days	2021	Democratic
61	Andre Dickens (born 1974)	January 3, 2022	Incumbent	4 years, 311 days	2025	Democratic

== See also ==
- Timeline of Atlanta
