= John B. Goodwin =

American politician (1850–1921)

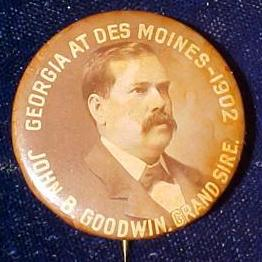
John Benjamin Goodwin 1902 IOOF Grand Sire of Georgia Button

John Benjamin Goodwin (September 22, 1850 – May 12, 1921) was born in Cobb County, Georgia, United States the son of and attended school in Powder Springs. He moved to Atlanta in 1870 and studied law at Gartrell & Stephens and a year later was admitted to the bar. From 1872 to 1874, he was a reporter for Alexander St. Clair-Abrams at the Daily Herald after which he returned to law.

He served on the city council off and on from then until 1883 when he was elected mayor, after which he served over ten years as city attorney, then served as mayor a second time during the Panic of 1893. He left the city in 1901 and for 16 years served as the grand secretary of the Sovereign Grand Lodge, Independent Order of Odd Fellows.

He died in 1921 in Baltimore, Maryland.

== Notes ==
Preceded by James W. English	Mayor of Atlanta; January 1883 – January 1885	Succeeded by George Hillyer
Preceded by William Hemphill	Mayor of Atlanta; January 1893 – January 1895	Succeeded by Porter King
