= James G. Woodward =

American politician

34th, 37th and 41st Mayor of Atlanta
- In office January 1913 – January 1917
- Preceded by: Courtland Winn
- Succeeded by: Asa Griggs Candler
- In office January 1905 – January 1907
- Preceded by: Evan Howell
- Succeeded by: Walthall Robertson Joyner
- In office January 1899 – January 1901
- Preceded by: Charles A. Collier
- Succeeded by: Livingston Mims

Personal details
- Born: January 14, 1845
- Died: August 29, 1923 (aged 78)
- Resting place: Oakland Cemetery; Atlanta, Georgia
- Party: Democratic

James G. Woodward (January 14, 1845 – August 29, 1923) was an American newspaperman and politician, having served as the 36th, 39th and 43rd Mayor of Atlanta, Georgia.

Woodward made his living as printer through the newsrooms of the Atlanta Journal and Constitution over the years. He was elected mayor in 1899 and 1904. Following the Atlanta race riot of 1906, he won the 1908 Democratic primary (in a virtually one party state) but was arrested for public intoxication less than a month before the December general election and was defeated by Robert Maddox. He served his third and fourth terms following Courtland Winn. Trying for a fifth term as Atlanta mayor, he ran (and lost) in September 1922, a year before his death.

The Atlanta race riot of 1906 was a defining moment of Woodward's political career.

The New York Times reported that when Woodward was asked as to the measures taken to prevent a race riot, he replied:

The best way to prevent a race riot depends entirely upon the cause. If your inquiry has anything to do with the present situation in Atlanta then I would say the only remedy is to remove the cause. As long as the black brutes assault our white women, just so long will they be unceremoniously dealt with.

He had gone around the city on Saturday night trying to calm the mobs, but was generally ignored.

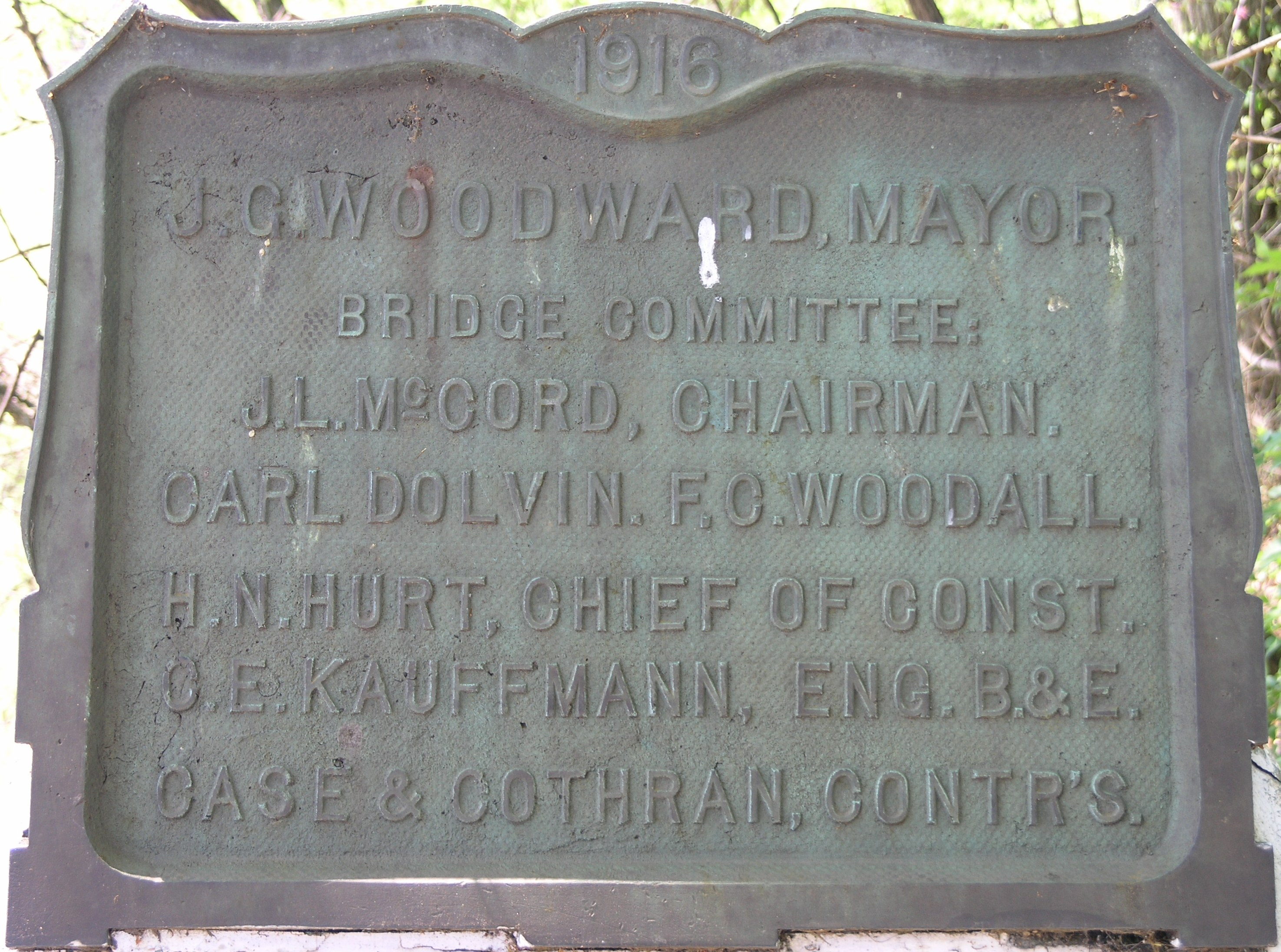
1916 plaque located in Piedmont Park and listing the mayor and members of a local bridge committee.

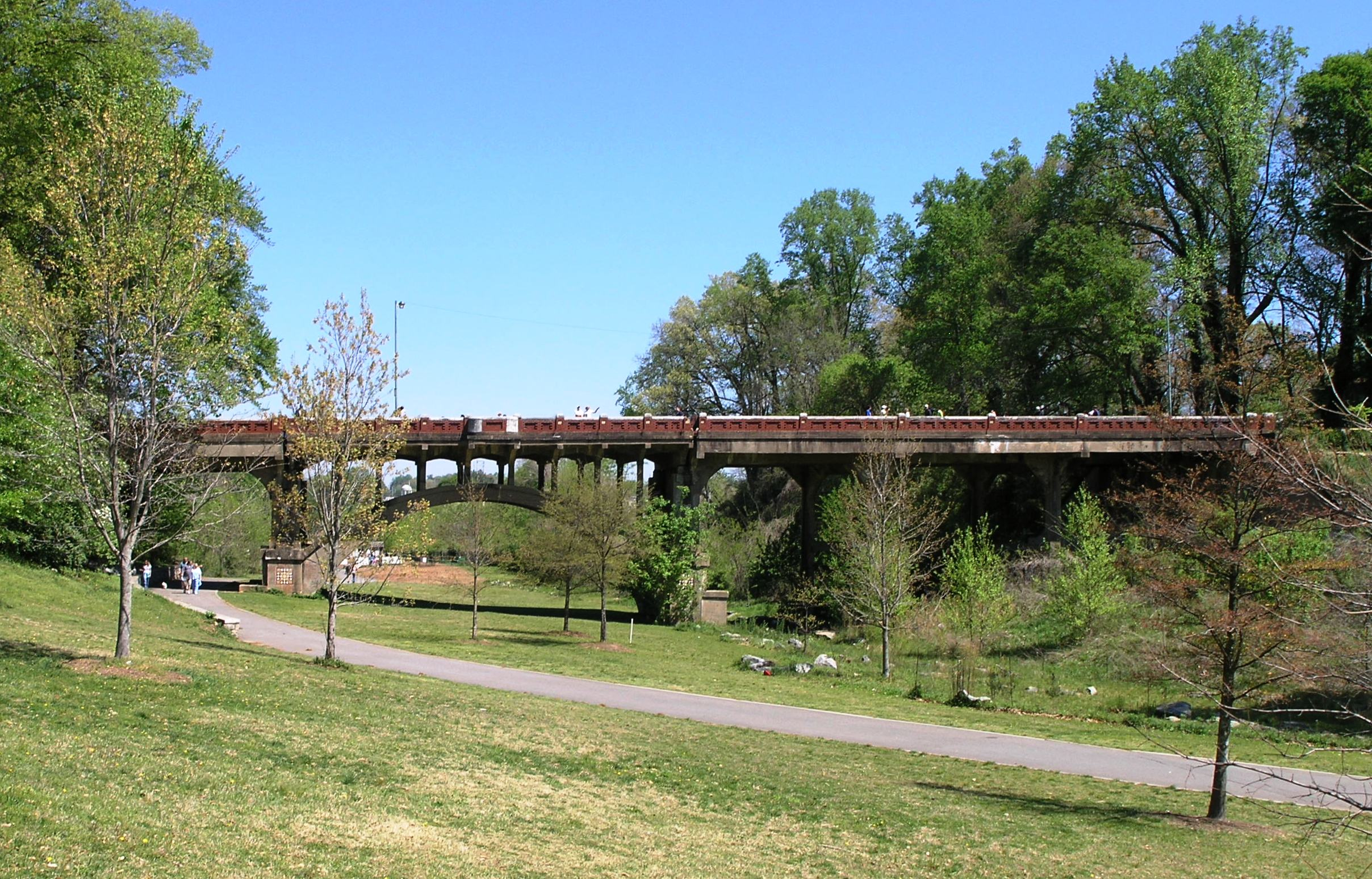
Woodward Bridge in Piedmont Park.

== Notes ==
Preceded by Charles A. Collier	Mayor of Atlanta; January 1899 – January 1901	Succeeded by Livingston Mims
Preceded by Evan Howell	Mayor of Atlanta; January 1905 – January 1907	Succeeded by W.R. Joyner
Preceded by Courtland Winn	Mayor of Atlanta; January 1913 – January 1917	Succeeded by Asa Candler
