= Atlanta graft ring =

The Atlanta graft ring was a corruption scandal that erupted in 1930 which generated 26 indictments and earned a Pulitzer Prize for the Atlanta Constitution newspaper.

Atlanta had prided itself for a relatively corruption-free government throughout its history, but this changed in the 1920s. On November 18, 1929, Fourth Ward Alderman Ben T. Huiet told the city council he had heard that payment of $3,500 was asked for in order to approve electrical wiring that had been installed in the new Atlanta City Hall, then under construction.

Soon after, Atlanta Constitution president Clark Howell, wrote a ringing editorial demanding the Fulton County grand jury to investigate. Foreman Thomas Lyon and Solicitor General John A. Boykin began the lengthy investigation during which, more than a thousand witnesses were called to look into the Mayor I.N. Ragsdale's administration and city council. Twenty-six indictments were made, of which fifteen were guilty and seven of those received prison sentences, including councilman Harry York.

The press coverage earned Howell and the Atlanta Constitution the 1931 Pulitzer Prize for Journalism in the Public Service category for "a successful municipal graft exposure and subsequent convictions."

Solicitor General Boykin went on to break up Atlanta's numbers game operation in 1936.
