= John Mims =

American politician (1815–1856)

6th Mayor of Atlanta
- In office January 17 – October 29, 1853
- Preceded by: Thomas Gibbs
- Succeeded by: William Markham

Personal details
- Born: November 10, 1815
- Died: April 30, 1856 (aged 40) Atlanta, Georgia, U.S.
- Resting place: Oakland Cemetery
- Party: Independent
- Spouse: Jane Farmer

John Floyd Mims (November 10, 1815 – April 30, 1856) was the sixth mayor of Atlanta and agent of the Georgia Railroad & Banking Company. He is remembered for his contributions to the construction of the first Atlanta City Hall.

== Early career ==
Mims worked as an agent at the Georgia Railroad and Banking Company depot in the 1840s. He first entered the public eye in 1847, when he opened the first Bank of Atlanta, which was incorporated in 1852 and shut down three years later in 1855.

In 1848, Mims helped build Atlanta's first flour mill, alongside Richard Peters, Lemuel Grant, and W.G. Peters. Peters sold the engines used at the mill to the Confederacy in 1861, which later used them to manufacture powder as part of the war effort. The building was replaced by the Confederacy with a small arms factory before it was burned in Sherman's March to the Sea.

On July 3, 1848 Mims was appointed by then-Mayor Moses Formwalt to the city's first Board of Health, alongside nine others.

== Mayor of Atlanta (1853) ==
Mims was elected Mayor on January 17, 1853. Among his first actions as mayor was his purchase of a four-acre plot of land from Atlanta founder and businessman Richard Peters, to make way for the construction of Atlanta's first City Hall (later replaced by the State Capitol). At a Council session on February 9, Mims was given permission to borrow $10,000 for allotment and construction costs. He arranged to purchase the plot on February 18 for $5,000, and the transaction was made on July 1. On February 16, Mayor Mims commissioned Atlanta's first city map. The map was produced by civil engineer Edward A. Vincent.

Much of Mims' tenure saw the development of new city infrastructure and utilities. Between February and October, he oversaw the construction and development of Market Street (now called Broad Street). In March, his administration motioned to establish the role of city surveyor, gave orders to expand the city's lighting network, and adopted an ordinance to protect the city's graveyard. Later that month he issued tax exemptions for bacon, lard, corn, flour, and other provisions.

Over the summer, Mayor Mims addressed a potential smallpox threat by moving the city's slaughterhouse outside city limits. On July 22, Mims purchased 105 acres of land from Allen E. Johnson for $1,800, to be used to open the city's first hospital.

On September 24, Mims' administration began advertising for the City Hall's construction bids.

Towards the end of his term, Mims petitioned state legislature to create Fulton County.

An illness forced Mims to resign on October 29, 1853. His term was completed by William Markham following a special election held on November 12. Markham's term saw the creation of Fulton County and the completion of the City Hall's construction.

== Personal life and death ==
Mims was married to his wife, Jane Farmer, on November 29, 1836 in Taliaferro County.

John Mims died on April 30, 1856 and is buried at Oakland Cemetery. His funeral was held the next day on May 1.

== Legacy ==
In 1934 work Official History of Fulton County, official Fulton historian Walter G. Cooper writes,

The Mayor and Council of 1853 was composed of progressive men whose names have come down to us as leading factors in the formative period of Atlanta. They did these four things of especial importance:

Bought for a City Hall the block on which the State Capitol stands.

Began building the City Hall.

Petitioned the legislature to create the new county of Fulton.

Appointed a committee to go before the legislature and ask for the removal of the State Capitol of Atlanta.

On February 22, 2024, legislation was written and sponsored by Georgia State Senators Donzella James and Michael Rhett to memorialize Mims' contributions to the City Hall. The bill was not passed, and died shortly thereafter.

Preceded by Thomas F. Gibbs	Mayor of Atlanta; January,1853 – October 29, 1853	Succeeded by William Markham
