= John J. Collier =

American politician

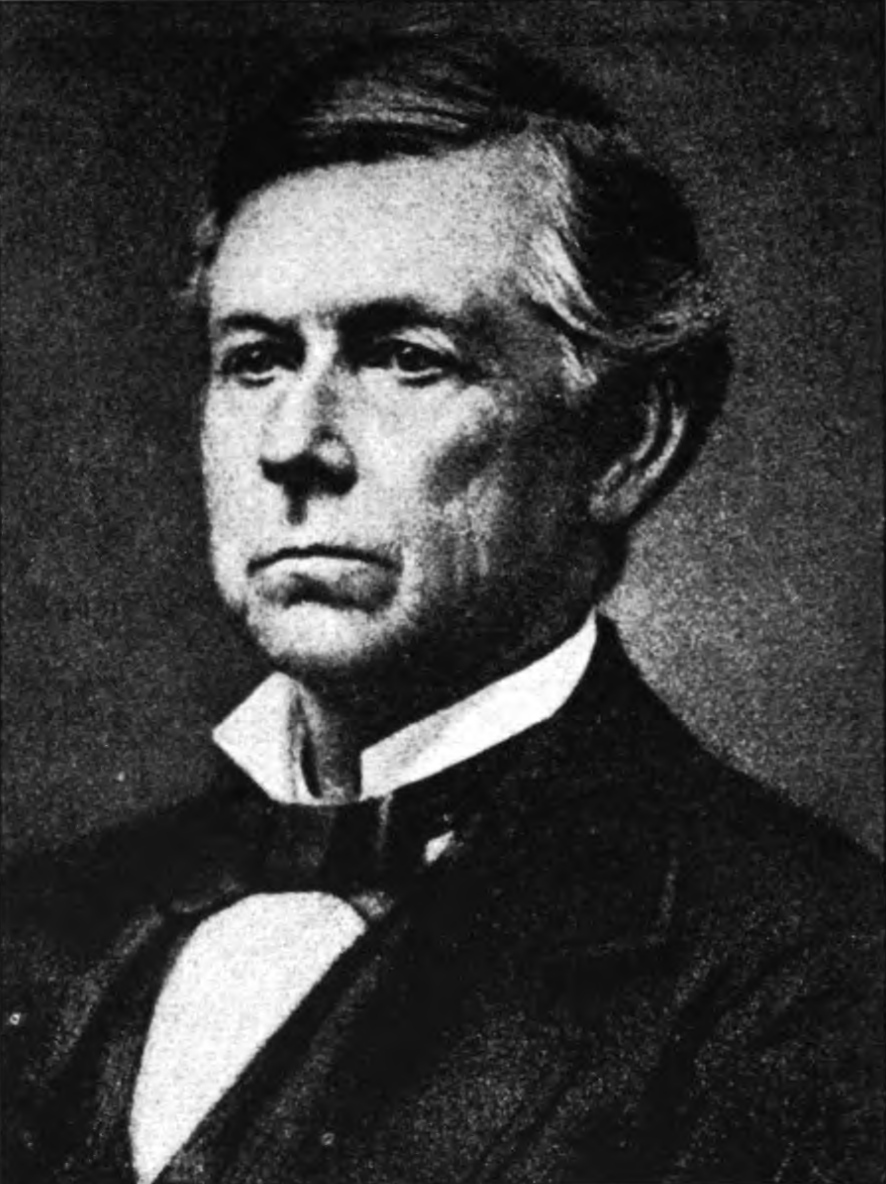
- Born: 1815; Gwinnett County, Georgia
- Died: 1892 (aged 76–77)
- Children: Charles A. Collier

Judge John Collier (May 6, 1815 – 1892) was a superior court judge from Atlanta, Georgia, commonly considered one of the city's "founding fathers". Collier filed the charter which renamed the city of "Marthasville" to "Atlanta" in 1848.

Judge Collier was among the Atlanta area's earliest white settlers. His father, Meredith Collier, settled on a plot of land near the neighborhood that is now known as Ansley Park. Judge Collier's brother, Washington Collier, is widely touted as being one of Atlanta's first settlers. Presumably "Wash" Collier ended up becoming the more notable of the clan because he opened and ran one of the first general stores near Atlanta's original railroad head and operated Atlanta's first mail service. The Historic Collier Heights community, located on the Westside of the city, and touted as one of Atlanta's most prestigious and affluent communities was named in John Collier's honor.

Judge Collier was the father of Charles A. Collier, a notable Georgia politician and attorney who served as mayor of Atlanta in the latter years of the 19th century.

== Biography ==
John Collier was born on May 6, 1815, in Gwinnett County, Georgia.

Collier was listed as a Member of the Bar in Atlanta in 1852. He later went on to serve in the Georgia State Senate and in 1867 was appointed 'Judge of the Circuit' (Superior Court) by Georgia Governor Charles J. Jenkins.

Collier died in 1892. He is interred in the Collier Mausoleum, Oakland Cemetery in Atlanta.

== See also ==
- List of mayors of Atlanta
