= John Tyler Cooper =

American politician (1844–1912)

30th Mayor of Atlanta

Personal details
- Born: March 26, 1844 Marietta, Georgia, US
- Died: November 21, 1912 (aged 68) Atlanta, Georgia, US
- Party: Democratic
- Spouse: Mary E Marks
- Profession: Politician

Military service
- Allegiance: Confederate States
- Branch/service: Confederate States Army
- Rank: Corporal
- Unit: 9th Battalion Georgia Artillery
- Battles/wars: American Civil War

John Tyler Cooper (March 26, 1844 – November 21, 1912) was an American politician, serving from 1887 until 1889 as the 30th Mayor of Atlanta, Georgia.

== Biography ==
Born in Marietta, Georgia, John T. Cooper was a grandson of tragedian Thomas Cooper and a great-grandson of Captain Edward Dunscomb, a noted New York soldier in the American Revolutionary War.

As a young man, Cooper served in a Georgia unit during the American Civil War in many battles, including Chickamauga. Following the war, he married Mary Crain Marks and raised a family.

During the winter of 1867–68, Cooper and other young men, including the younger brother of future mayor George Hillyer, organized the Young Men's Democratic Club of Atlanta and became active in local politics.

On July 4, 1879, Cooper was admitted to the Society of the Cincinnati. In 1884, he served as councilman of Atlanta's Sixth Ward before he was elected mayor.

== Notes ==
Preceded by George Hillyer	Mayor of Atlanta; January 1887 – January 1889	Succeeded by John Thomas Glenn
