= John H. James (mayor) =

American politician

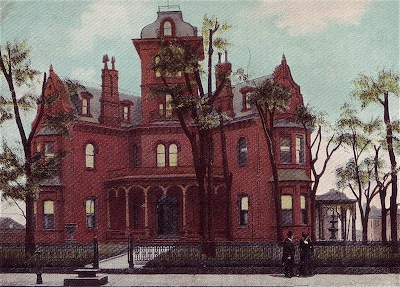
The John H. James mansion, later the Georgia Governor's mansion 1870-1923

John H. James (July 14, 1830 – July 14, 1917) was an American banker, politician, and businessman who served as the 21st Mayor of Atlanta, Georgia, in 1871.

James was born in Henry County, Georgia, where he farmed until moving to Atlanta in 1850 to clerk for $10 a month and after three years was making $700 a year. After that he went into sales, running auctions of books, jewelry and other valuables throughout the Southern states.

During the American Civil War he and his wife travelled to Canada and Nassau, Bahamas, and afterwards they returned to Atlanta where he founded the James Bank. In 1869, he purchased a large city lot that stretched from Peachtree to Spring Street along Cain (today's International Blvd) and built a large mansion designed by William H. Parkins. Within a year it was purchased by the state of Georgia to become the Governor's mansion for which purpose it survived until 1923. He made over $30,000 on the deal and immediately built his next home on the south end of that same block (where the old Macy's building stands today).

He won nearly 100% of the December 1871 mayoral election as a Democrat which put an end to the brief surge of Radical Republican power in the city. He sold his home at Ellis and Peachtree in 1883 to the Capital City Club who used it until their new building on Harris was completed in 1913. He died in 1917 on the day of his 87th birthday.

== See also ==
- Garrett, Franklin, Atlanta and Its Environs, 1954.

Preceded by Dennis F. Hammond	Mayor of Atlanta; 1872–1873	Succeeded by Cicero C. Hammock
