= William Butt =

American politician

Mayor of Atlanta, Georgia
- In office 1854–1855

Personal details
- Born: c. 1805
- Died: 1888
- Party: Republican

William Moore Butt (c. 1805–1888) was a politician in Georgia.

Butt arrived in Atlanta in 1851 from Campbell County, Georgia, where he had been an Inferior Court judge, and became a merchant. He served as a councilman in 1853. The next year, he was elected the eighth mayor.

Preceded by William Markham	Mayor of Atlanta; 1854–1855	Succeeded by Allison Nelson
