= Robert Maddox =

American mayor (1870-1965)

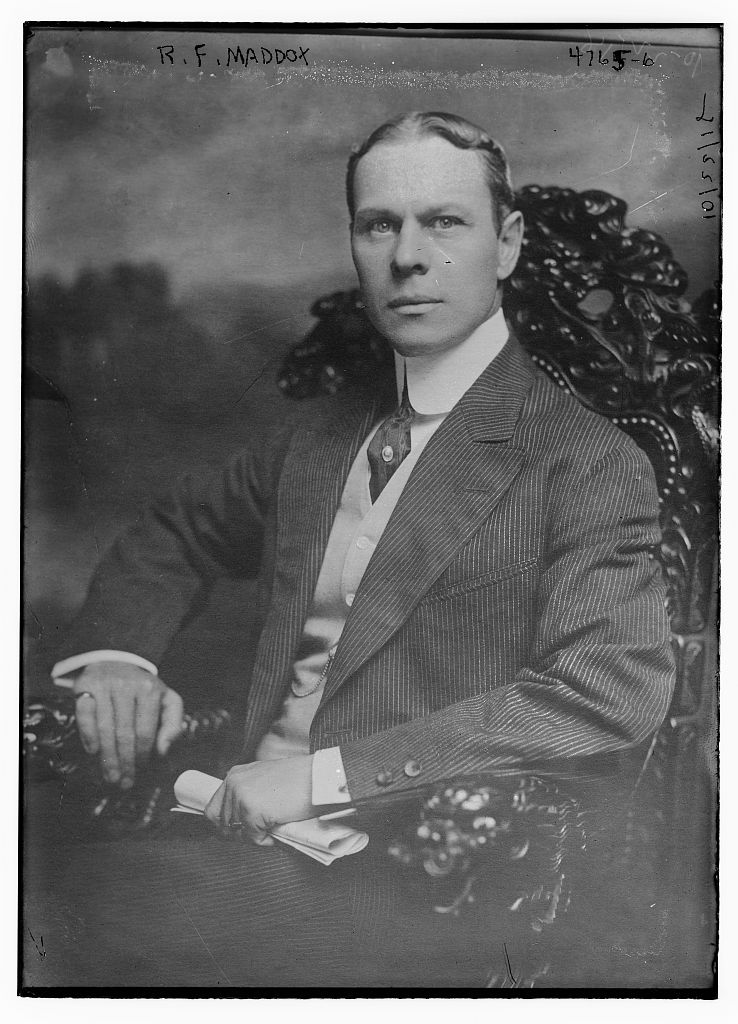
- Maddox in 1918

39th Mayor of Atlanta, Georgia
- In office January 1909 – January 1911
- Preceded by: Walthall Robertson Joyner
- Succeeded by: Courtland Winn

Personal details
- Born: Robert Foster Maddox; April 4, 1870
- Died: 1965 (aged 94–95)
- Education: Harvard University

Robert Foster Maddox (April 4, 1870 – 1965) was the 41st Mayor of Atlanta, Georgia.

== Biography ==
Maddox was born on April 4, 1870, to Robert Flournoy Maddox, an early Atlanta settler and war hero.

He was educated in public school, and then attended the University of Georgia until 1887 when he completed studies at Harvard University.

He was chairman of the board of the Atlanta & Lowry National Bank part of which had been founded by his father. In 1908, he served as a Fulton County commissioner and the next year he was elected Atlanta's mayor. He had an active term, issuing the city's first large bond ($3 million) which was used for new schools, sewage disposal plants and enlarging the Atlanta Water Works.

He also had built an addition to Grady Memorial Hospital and via many trips to Washington, D.C., was able to purchase the old post office for $70,000 to be used as the City Halls of Atlanta.

During his term, the city doubled in scope: adding Oakland City among other neighborhoods.

He died in 1965.

== Legacy ==
When Robert Maddox was in his 80s, Vernon E. Jordan Jr. served as his chauffeur.

Maddox Park in Atlanta's Bankhead neighborhood is named in his honor. The park was dedicated in 1931. He lies in the Maddox mausoleum (with his father) in Oakland Cemetery.

Maddox Road in Morrow, Georgia, is named after him, along with a Clayton County Parks and Recreation park, playground, and basketball court in Morrow, Georgia.

Preceded by W.R. Joyner	Mayor of Atlanta; January 1909 – January 1911	Succeeded by Courtland S. Winn
