= William Markham (mayor) =

American politician (1811–1890)

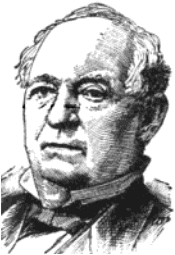

7th Mayor of Atlanta
- In office 1853–1854

Personal details
- Born: October 9, 1811 Goshen, Connecticut, U.S.
- Died: November 9, 1890 (aged 79) Atlanta, Georgia, U.S.
- Resting place: Oakland Cemetery
- Spouse: Amanda D. Berry (m. 1839)
- Occupation: Hotel owner, politician

William Markham (October 9, 1811 – November 9, 1890) was a hotel owner in Atlanta, who served as mayor of that city from 1853 to 1854.

== Biography ==
William Markham was born in Goshen, Connecticut on October 9, 1811. He was educated in New Hartford, and worked as a farmer in McDonough, Georgia for 14 years. He married Amanda D. Berry on October 8, 1839, and they had two children.

He moved to Atlanta in 1853, and that October, following the illness of John Mims, he filled in as mayor and won a special election soon after. During his term, a new city hall was built that was used for nearly 25 years. By 1858 he was proprietor of the Atlanta Rolling Mill, and following the Battle of Atlanta he was part of the committee of citizens who surrendered the city.

Within a year of destruction of Atlanta, he had already started rebuilding commercial sites. He put up nine one-story stores with cheap temporary roofs designed to be rebuilt or improved as circumstances improved. They cost $3,000 a piece to build and were rented out to different merchants.

In 1870 he lost an election for a second term as mayor from the Radical Party to another previous mayor, William Ezzard, Democrat. He dedicated the city's largest hotel, the Markham House, on November 15, 1875. It had 107 rooms, central heat and was the center of civic life until it burned to the ground in 1896, six years after the death of its builder.

William Markham died in Atlanta on November 9, 1890. He was buried at Oakland Cemetery.

Preceded by John F. Mims	Mayor of Atlanta; November 1853 – 1854	Succeeded by William M. Butt
