= Edward C. Peters =

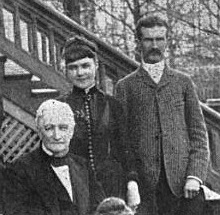
- Peters (right) with his wife Helen (middle) and father Richard (left)
- Born: Edward Conyngham Peters; October 22, 1855; Atlanta, Georgia, U.S.
- Died: February 1, 1937 (aged 81); Atlanta, Georgia, U.S.
- Occupation: Real estate developer
- Spouse: Helen Wimberly (m. 1878; died 1936)
- Children: 2
- Parent(s): Mary Jane Thompson Peters; Richard Peters
- Relatives: Richard Peters (brother); Ralph Peters (brother); Nellie Peters Black (sister); Richard Peters (grandfather)

Edward Conyngham Peters (October 22, 1855 – February 1, 1937) was an Atlanta real estate developer. He was the son of Richard Peters, a founder of the city.

== Early life ==
Peters was born on October 22, 1855, in Atlanta, Georgia. He was one of nine children born to Mary Jane (née Thompson) Peters (1830–1911) and Richard Peters (1810–1889), a railroad executive who was one of the founders of Atlanta. Among his siblings were Richard, Ralph, president of the Long Island Rail Road, and Nellie, who also became prominent.

His paternal grandfather was Richard Peters, a reporter of Decisions to the U.S. Supreme Court, and his great-grandfather was Continental Congressman Richard Peters, a Pennsylvania jurist. His maternal grandfather was Dr. Joseph Thompson, an early settler and doctor.

== Career ==
In 1889, upon his father's death, Edward inherited Richard's land, railroad and trolley interests. He operated a real estate firm known as Peters Land Co., founded in 1890, and was a member of the Atlanta City Council, and donated the land for Peters Park in 1887.

He sold off the land for the development of what is now the southern half of Midtown Atlanta (below 8th Street, as far west as Atlantic St. on the Georgia Tech campus, to Argonne St. east of Piedmont).

Peters also served as president of the Atlanta Savings Bank, the Exposition Cotton Mills, and was one of the organizers of the Fourth National Bank in Atlanta.

== Personal life ==
On November 19, 1878, Peters was married to Macon native, Helen Wimberly (d. 1936), the daughter of Ezekiel Wimberly and Mary Victoria (née Holt) Wimberly. Together, they were the parents of:

- Wimberly B. Peters (1885–1948), who married Lucille Kuhrt.
- Edna Peters, who died in infancy.

His wife died at their home in June 1936 after five years of illness. Peters died on February 1, 1937, in Atlanta and was buried at Westview Cemetery.

=== Residence ===
Peters' residence, the Edward C. Peters House, built in 1883 and designed by architect G. L. Norrman in the Queen Anne style, on the southwest corner of Ponce de Leon Avenue and Piedmont, is now used by the Savannah College of Art and Design and is listed on the National Register of Historic Places.
