= Ralph Peters (railroad executive) =

American railroad executive (1853–1923)

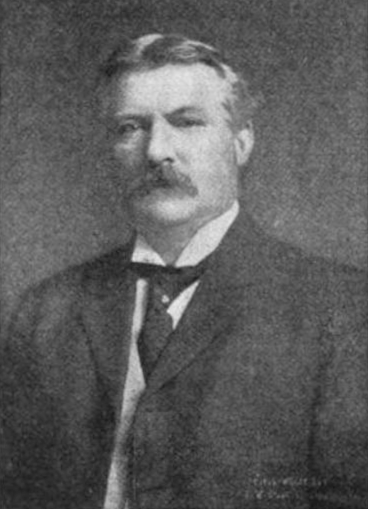
- Born: November 19, 1853; Atlanta, Georgia
- Died: October 9, 1923 (aged 69); Garden City, New York
- Education: University of Georgia
- Occupation: Railroad executive

Ralph Peters (November 19, 1853 – October 9, 1923) was an American railroad executive who served as the president of the Long Island Rail Road.

== Early life and education ==
Peters was born in Atlanta on November 19, 1853. He was one of nine children born to Mary Jane (née Thompson) Peters (1830–1911) and Richard Peters (1810–1889), a railroad executive who was one of the founders of Atlanta. Among his siblings was Richard, Edward, and Nellie, who also became prominent.

His paternal grandfather was Richard Peters, a reporter of Decisions to the U.S. Supreme Court, and his great-grandfather was Continental Congressman Richard Peters, a Pennsylvania jurist. His maternal grandfather was Dr. Joseph Thompson, an early settler and doctor.

Peters graduated from the University of Georgia (UGA) in Athens, Georgia, with a Bachelor of Arts in 1872.

== Career ==
Peters was elected president of the LIRR in April 1905. He was the twentieth President of the Long Island since its incorporation in 1834.

== Death ==
Peters died at his home in Garden City, Long Island on October 9, 1923.

Business positions
Preceded by William F. Potter	President of Long Island Rail Road; 1905 – 1923	Succeeded by Samuel Rea
