= Richard Peters (clubman) =

American civil engineer

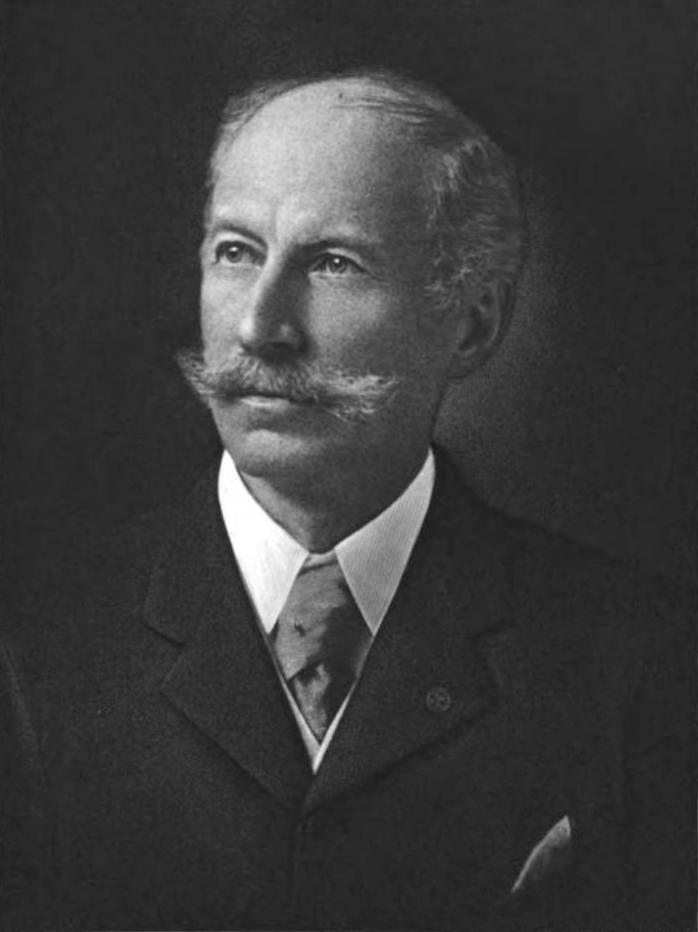
- Born: November 2, 1848; Atlanta, Georgia, U.S.
- Died: May 24, 1921 (aged 72); Philadelphia, Pennsylvania, U.S.
- Education: Rensselaer Polytechnic Institute
- Occupation: Civil engineer
- Spouse: Harriet Parker Felton (m. 1874)
- Children: 5
- Parent(s): Mary Jane Thompson Peters; Richard Peters
- Relatives: Edward C. Peters (brother); Ralph Peters (brother); Nellie Peters Black (sister); Richard Peters (grandfather)

Richard Peters (November 2, 1848 – May 24, 1921) was an American civil engineer, railroad executive, soldier, and clubman who was prominent in society during the Gilded Age.

== Early life ==
Peters was born on November 2, 1848, in Atlanta, Georgia. He was the oldest of nine children born to Mary Jane (née Thompson) Peters (1830–1911) and Richard Peters (1810–1889), a railroad executive who was one of the founders of Atlanta. Among his siblings was Edward, Ralph, president of the Long Island Rail Road, and Nellie, who also became prominent.

His paternal grandfather was Richard Peters, a reporter of Decisions to the U.S. Supreme Court, and his great-grandfather was Continental Congressman Richard Peters, a Pennsylvania jurist. His maternal grandfather was Dr. Joseph Thompson, an early settler and doctor.

During the U.S. Civil War, his parents sent him abroad where he was educated at private schools in England.

== Career ==
After returning to America, he became a civil engineer and attended the Rensselaer Polytechnic Institute in Troy, New York, where he was a member of the Theta Xi fraternity. In 1880, he became secretary of the Chester Rolling Mill, in Chester, Pennsylvania, a large iron mill that provided parts to the Delaware River Iron Ship Building and Engine Works. He later organized and served as the first president of the Chester Street Railways Co., retiring in 1915.

In 1917, after America entered World War I and despite his advanced age, Peters enlisted in the U.S. Army, and served in France at Château-Thierry (during the Battle of Château-Thierry) and Saint-Mihiel (during the Battle of Saint-Mihiel). For his efforts during the War, he was decorated with four Croix de Guerre and was awarded the Légion d'Honneur.

=== Society life ===
In 1892, Peters, then "head of the oldest branch of a famous colonial family", was included in Ward McAllister's "Four Hundred", purported to be an index of New York's best families, published in The New York Times. Conveniently, 400 was the number of people that could fit into Mrs. Astor's ballroom. At the time of his death, he was the oldest member of the Charity Ball Committee of Philadelphia, having served for thirty years. He was a member of the Philadelphia Art Club and the Penn Club, and belonged to the Pennsylvania Society of the Sons of the Revolution, the Pennsylvania Society of Colonial Wars, the Historical Society of Pennsylvania, the Numismatic and Antiquarian Society, and the American Institute of Mining Engineers.

== Personal life ==
On June 30, 1874, Peters was married to Harriet Parker Felton (1851–1929), the daughter of Samuel Morse Felton Sr., also a civil engineer and railroad executive, and sister of Samuel Morse Felton Jr., the Director General of Military Railways at the Western Front during World War I. Together, they were the parents of:

- Edith Macausland Peters (1875–1930), an art student at Bryn Mawr College.
- Ethel Conway Peters (1879–1962), who married Smedley Butler (1881–1940), son of Thomas S. Butler and grandson of Smedley Darlington, in 1905.
- Richard Peters Jr. (1880–1941), a sales manager of the Pulaski Iron Co. based in Philadelphia who married Eula Drennan.
- Samuel Morse Felton Peters (b. 1883).
- Hope Conyngham Peters (b. 1890), who married C. S. Ashby Henry in 1909.

Peters died on May 24, 1921, at the Women's College Hospital in Philadelphia.
