= Peters Park =

Peters Park may refer to:

- Peters Park (Atlanta), a failed project to build one of Atlanta's first garden suburbs, now the site of the Georgia Tech campus
- Peters Park (Boston), a neighborhood in Boston
