= Augustin S. Clayton =

American politician (1783–1839)

Member of the U.S. House of Representatives from Georgia's at-large district
- In office January 21, 1832 – March 3, 1835
- Preceded by: Wilson Lumpkin
- Succeeded by: George Towns

Personal details
- Born: Augustin Smith Clayton; November 27, 1783 Fredericksburg, Virginia, U.S.
- Died: June 21, 1839 (aged 55) Athens, Georgia, U.S.
- Resting place: Oconee Hill Cemetery
- Spouse: Julia Carnes (m. 1807)
- Children: 7, including William
- Education: University of Georgia (BA)
- Occupation: Lawyer; judge; politician; writer

Augustin Smith Clayton (November 27, 1783 – June 21, 1839) was a jurist and politician from the American state of Georgia.

== Early life ==
Augustin Smith Clayton was born on November 27, 1783, in Fredericksburg, Virginia, to Philip Clayton. In 1794, he moved with his family to Richmond County, Georgia. He attended the Richmond Academy in Augusta, Georgia, and graduated with the inaugural class of Franklin College (now known as the Franklin College of Arts and Sciences) at the University of Georgia in Athens with a Bachelor of Arts in 1804. While at the University of Georgia, Clayton founded the Demosthenian Literary Society.

After studying law under the tutelage of judge Thomas P. Carnes, Clayton was admitted to the bar in 1806.

== Career ==
Clayton began practicing law in Carnesville, Georgia (which was named after his tutor Carnes). He then moved to Athens.

In 1810, Clayton was elected to represent Clarke County in the Georgia House of Representatives and served through 1812. In that same year, he became the secretary for the board of trustees for the University of Georgia. Clayton was appointed to the board in 1816 and remained on the board until his death.

Clayton also served as the clerk of the Georgia House from 1813 to 1815. In 1826 and 1827, he served in the Georgia Senate. Clayton also served as judge of the superior court of the western circuit of Georgia both preceding (1819–1825) and following (1828–1831) his state senate service. In 1829, he was a presidential elector. In 1829, Clayton upheld the state's right to bring the territory of the Cherokee Nation within the jurisdiction of Georgia. The case lead to the Supreme Court case Cherokee Nation v. Georgia. He was later removed from office for opposing the state's policy on the Cherokee Nation's rights. In 1831, Clayton won a special election to fill the remaining term of the resigning Wilson Lumpkin in the United States House of Representatives, and Clayton won reelection to a second term in the regular election in 1832. He was elected as a Jacksonian Democrat, defeating Judge Schley with a 1,046 vote majority. He served from January 21, 1832, to March 3, 1835. During his tenure, he was opposed to the tariffs and the Bank of the United States.

Clayton maintained business interests in the construction of a cotton mill in 1827 known as the Georgia Factory on the Ocoee River located south of Athens. He also played an instrumental role in securing the charter for the Georgia Railroad in 1836. In 1837, he delivered an address supporting the American Colonization Society in Athens, while he criticized the cause of abolition of slavery.

After his congressional service, Clayton returned to Athens and practiced law.

== Personal life ==
In 1807, Clayton married Julia Carnes, daughter of his tutor Thomas P. Carnes, and in 1808 they moved to Athens. Clayton's granddaughter, Julia Carnes King, would marry another famous University of Georgia alumnus, Henry W. Grady. His seven children included William Wirt Clayton (1812–1885), who would later become a judge, director of the Western and Atlantic Railroad, tax collector for Fulton County, Georgia and an officer of the Georgia National Bank. At the time of his death, he was a member of the Methodist Episcopal Church.

Clayton died at his home in Athens on June 21, 1839, and was buried in its Oconee Hill Cemetery.

== Legacy ==
Places named for him include Clayton, Georgia, Clayton County, Georgia, and Clayton, Alabama. His final residence in Athens was located on the north side of Clayton Street, which the city named for him, approximately halfway between Thomas and Jackson Streets. (Lawrenceville, Georgia, named for a War of 1812 hero, also has a street named for Clayton, the only one of its original streets that does not commemorate a veteran of that war.)

Clayton was a friend and congressional colleague of Davy Crockett. Literary scholar John Donald Wade posited that Clayton was the ghost writer (or at least co-writer) of Crockett's autobiography, and possibly some of his other published works, but this suggestion has been robustly challenged. He was reported to be the author of the political pamphlet "Crockett's Life of Van Buren".

U.S. House of Representatives
Preceded by Wilson Lumpkin	Member of the U.S. House of Representatives from Georgia's at-large congressional district January 21, 1832 – March 3, 1835	Succeeded by George Towns
