= Crenshaw Company =

American blockade running company

The Crenshaw Company was a blockade running company established during the American Civil War.

The company was founded by the brothers James and William Crenshaw of Richmond, Virginia. They had numerous steamers built on behalf of the confederacy to run supplies between Bermuda, Nassau, England, and Wilmington, North Carolina. James was the agent in Nassau, and William the agent in Liverpool.

In early 1864, they contracted with Atlantans Richard Peters and Vernon Stevenson, and Richard Wilson to move cotton from the interior to the best remaining Confederate port at that time, Wilmington.

Wilson negotiated sales to England for return cargoes of beef, pork and coffee as well as materials for the assembly of cotton bales (iron hoops and gunny cloth).

During that time, the Captains were Englishman George M. Horner and Michael Philip Usina of Savannah and two steamers: Marie Celeste and Atlanta.

First voyage was Usina on the new sidewheeler Marie Celeste from Wilmington to Bermuda with 1,000 bales of cotton. The Atlanta was completed in March 1864 and reached Bermuda in April and in the next three months made four trips to Wilmington, the last of which (with Captain Usina) was a close scrape with the Union blockade in which he was able to escape into the Cape Fear River and make his delivery.

On June 20, 1864, both ships were at port in St. George, Bermuda.

Marie Celeste left Bermuda on September 26, 1864, for Wilmington with a full cargo of canned meats but struck a reef and sank in 6 minutes. The ship was a total loss and the wreck is now a diving attraction.
