= Edward C. Peters House =

Historic house in Georgia, United States

- U.S. National Register of Historic Places
- Atlanta Landmark Building
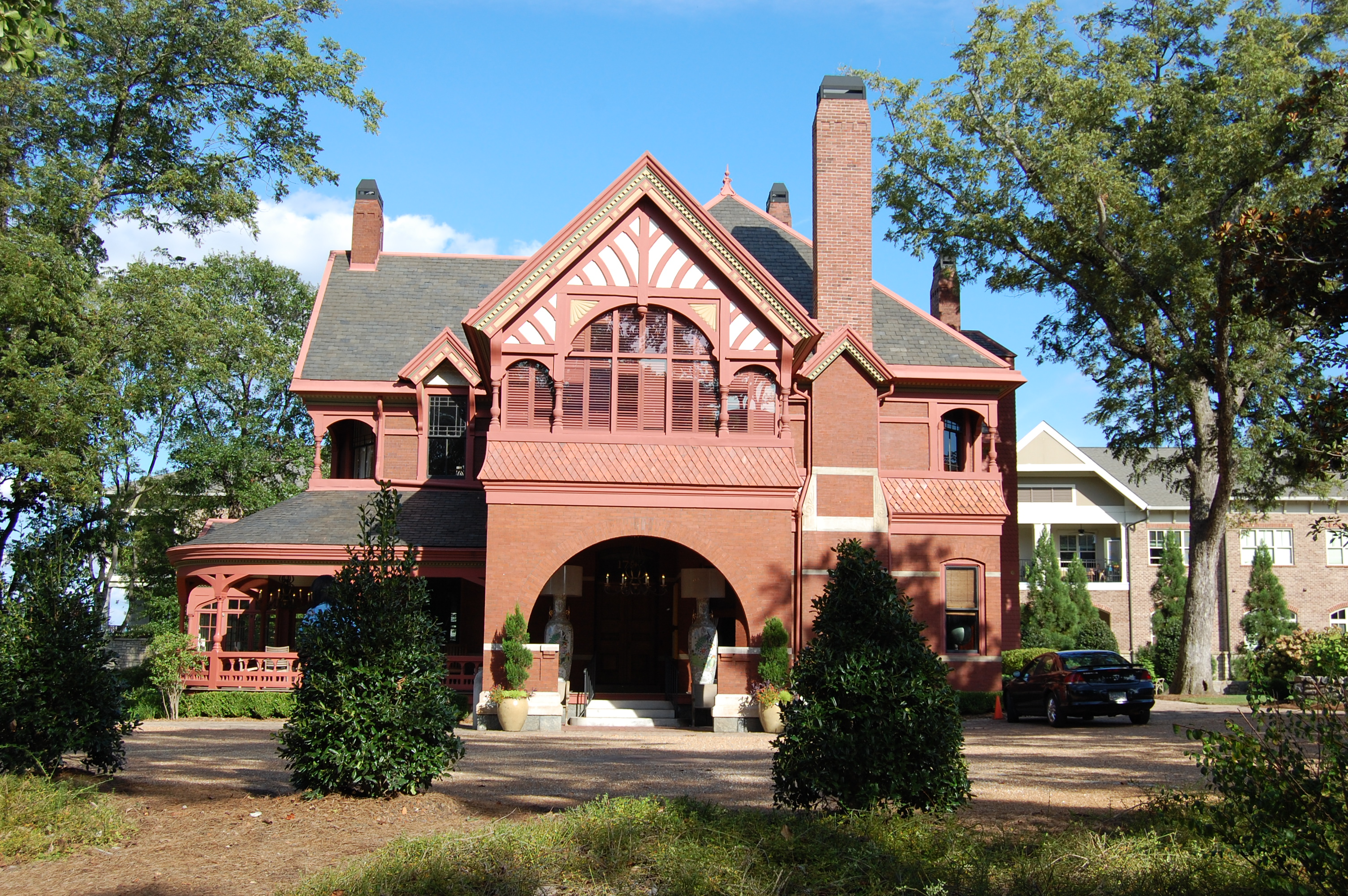
- Edward C. Peters House (Ivy Hall)

- Location within Atlanta Location within Georgia Location within the United States
- Location: Atlanta, Georgia
- Coordinates: 33°46′19″N 84°22′52″W
- Built: 1883
- Architect: G. L. Norrman
- Architectural style: Queen Anne, Shingle Style
- NRHP reference No.: 72000384

Significant dates
- Added to NRHP: January 20, 1972
- Designated ALB: October 23, 1989

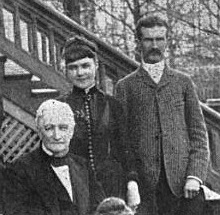
Edward C. Peters (right) with his wife Helen (middle) and father Richard (left)

The Edward C. Peters House, also known as Ivy Hall, is a Queen Anne style house in Atlanta, Georgia. It occupies a lot covering an entire city block on the southeast corner of Piedmont Avenue and Ponce de Leon Avenue in Midtown Atlanta, just north of the SoNo neighborhood. Its current owner is the Savannah College of Art and Design.

== History ==
The house was built in 1883 for Edward C. Peters. The architect was Gottfried I. Norrman, a Swedish immigrant. The house incorporates references to the Peters family, such as tiles depicting the Philadelphia Fish and Chowder Society founded by Edward's great-grandfather Richard Peters, Jr. Edward's father, also named Richard Peters, was instrumental in the founding and transformation of the small town of Marthasvillle into Atlanta. Edward inherited Richard's railroad and trolley interests in 1889.

The Peters House survived the Great Atlanta Fire of 1917, when houses between North Avenue and Ponce de Leon Avenue were dynamited as a firebreak. After the death of Peters' daughter-in-law in 1970 the house was threatened with demolition, but it became The Mansion restaurant, operated by Bill Swearingen three years later.

The interiors have been largely preserved, although a fire in 2000 caused the restaurant to close. In 2005 the house was acquired by the Savannah College of Art and Design. A full restoration of Ivy Hall was undertaken, reopening on October 3, 2008. A portion of the grounds was developed with housing.

== Photo gallery ==
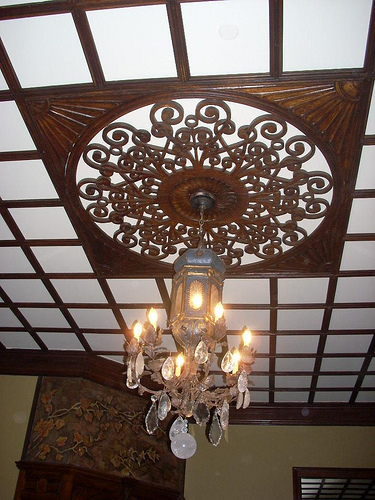
Chandelier in foyer

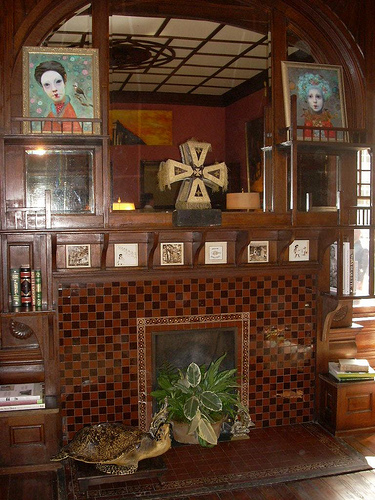
Dining room mantel (tiles depicting Philadelphia Fish and Chowder Society)

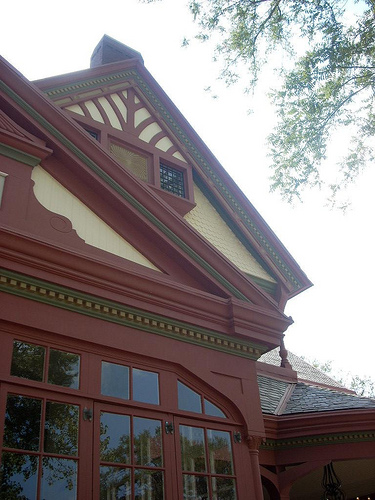
Architectural detail

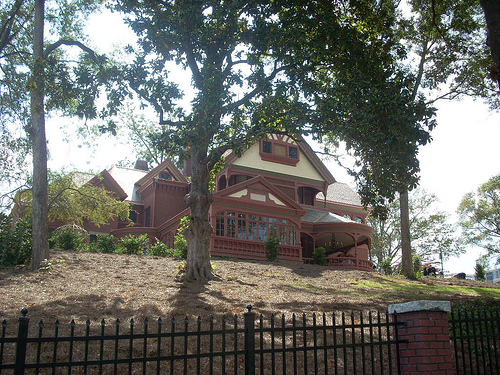
Back and side view of home

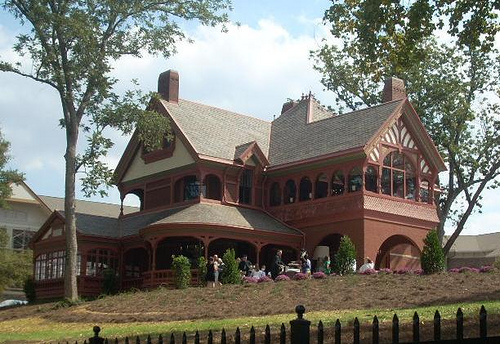
View from Ponce De Leon Avenue

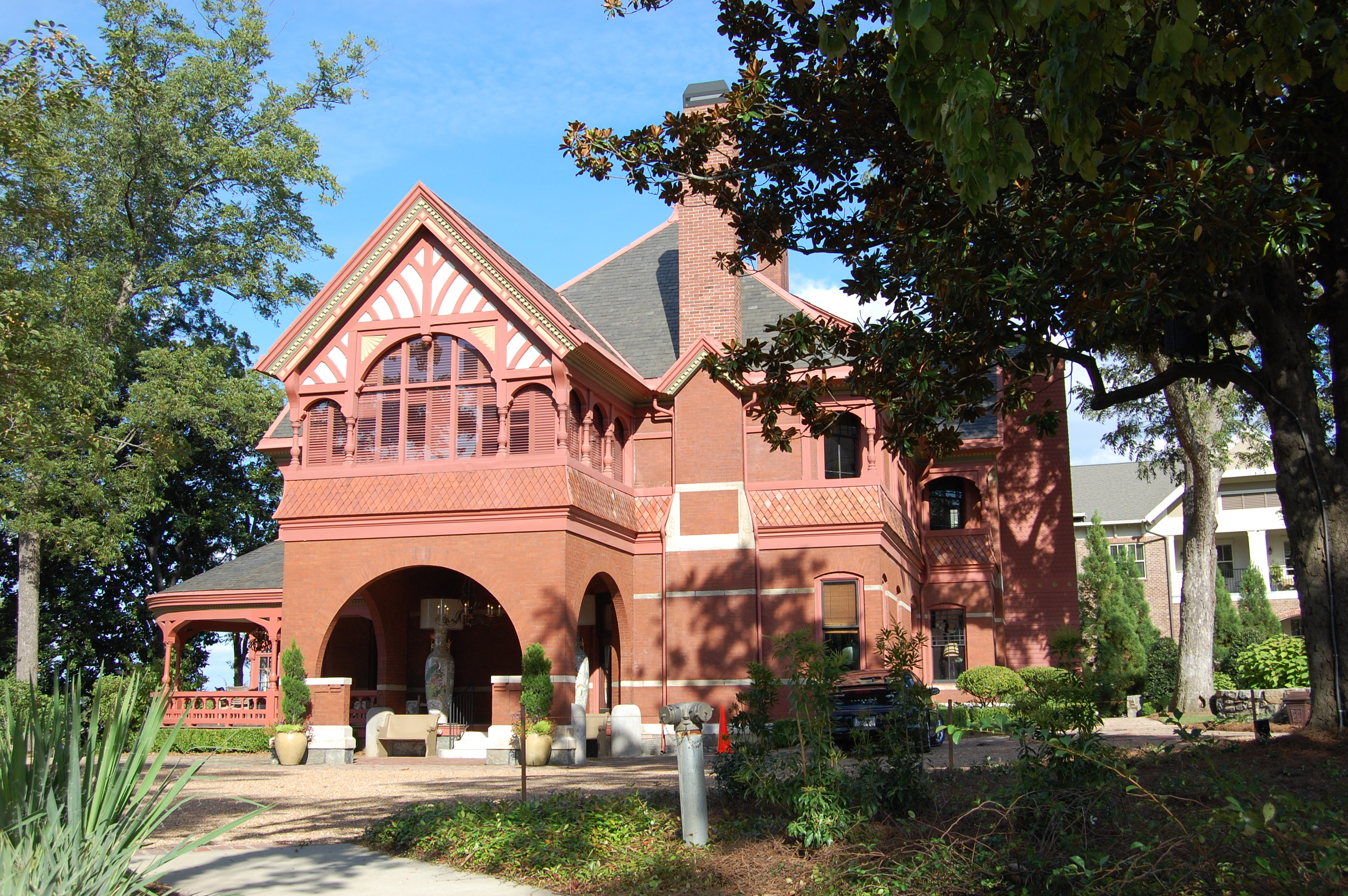
Another view of the home
