= William Wirt Clayton =

William Wirt Clayton (1812–1885) was the son of Georgia politician Augustin Smith Clayton. In Atlanta, Georgia, W. W. Clayton became a judge, director of the Western and Atlantic Railroad, tax collector for Fulton County, Georgia and an officer of the Georgia National Bank.
