= Hannibal Kimball =

American entrepreneur (1832–1895)

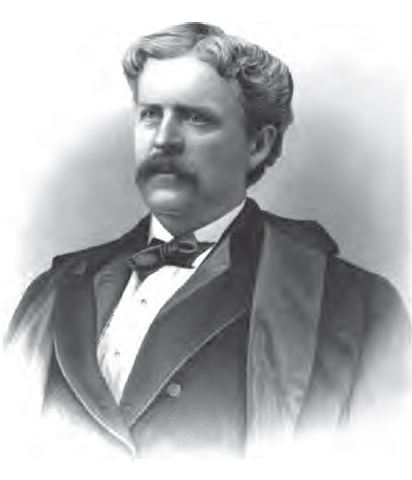
- Born: May 16, 1832; Oxford County, Maine
- Died: April 28, 1895 (aged 62); Brookline, Massachusetts
- Occupation: Businessman
- Known for: The Kimball House hotels
- Spouse: Mary Cook (m. 1858)
- Children: Ingalls Kimball

Signature
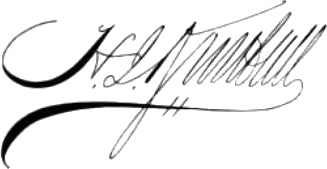

Hannibal Ingalls Kimball (May 16, 1832 – April 28, 1895) was an American entrepreneur and important businessman in post-Civil War Atlanta, Georgia.

== Early years ==
Born in Oxford County, Maine, to family of Methodist wheelwrights. He was the fifth boy of 10 children by his father, Peter Kimball, a highly regarded wheelwright, and his mother, Betsey Emerson.

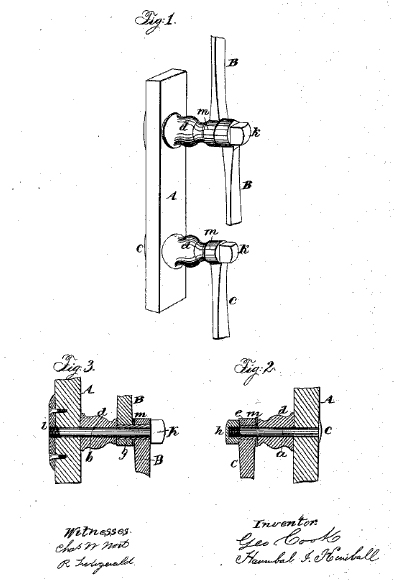
Figure 1 from US Patent #26564 by States George Cook and Hannibal I. Kimball for a carriage top-prop

Hannibal stayed in the family business and the carriage business. He moved first to Norway, Maine, and later to the largest carriage manufacturing center, New Haven, Connecticut, where he partnered with his brothers George and John in a business making coach carvings and carriage parts later taken over by G .& D. Cook & Co Carriage Makers. Kimball was made partner in the company after the takeover. The carriage company flourished, and by 1860 it had over 300 employees. Many of their customers were in the South, and after the start of the American Civil War many debts went unpaid and the business failed.

Kimball and George Cook also invented a top-prop for carriages. The patent was issued on December 27, 1859

In 1858, Kimball married Mary Cook, the eldest daughter of his business partner, George Cook. Kimball then moved to Central City, Colorado, as the agent for a mining company, and regained his fortune. While in Colorado, he met George Pullman, who hired him in 1866 to establish the Pullman Company's sleeping car lines in the South. Initially to be headquartered in Nashville, Tennessee, he decided on Atlanta, moving his family there in 1867.

Kimball was the father of American printer Ingalls Kimball, born April 2, 1874, with the same full name, Hannibal Ingalls Kimball.

== Capital of Georgia ==
One of his first tasks in Atlanta was helping to convince the constitutional convention of Georgia to move the state capital from Milledgeville to Atlanta. In 1868, shortly after the congress agreed to move the capital, Kimball purchased an abandoned opera house and constructed the first capitol building. The building was completed in only four months, after which it was leased to the city, which agreed to provide it without cost to the state for 10 years. The next year, the Georgia Legislature purchased the building, with the city paying $100,000 for part of the cost, firmly establishing Atlanta as the capital city of Georgia.

On March 16, 1869, Kimball, along with Edward N. Kimball, John Rice, John C. Peck, and Jame A. Burns, incorporated the Atlanta Canal and Water Company. The company had previously been incorporated to cut canals from the Chattahoochee River into and throughout the city streets for sanitary and other uses. However, the previous company had not completed any work on the project. The new Atlanta Canal and Water Company constructed Atlanta's first sewer system.

== 1870 Agricultural Fair ==
In 1870, the city contracted Kimball to construct the grounds and buildings for an agricultural fair to be held that year in Oglethorpe Park. The project required over 60 acres (24 ha) of forest to be cleared and buildings constructed on the site. Six months later, Kimball completed the project and turned it over to the city and the State Agricultural Society. He was later contracted by the city to manage the fair.

In 1870 Kimball became a shareholder in the Georgia National Bank, which would fail a few years thereafter.

== The first Kimball House ==
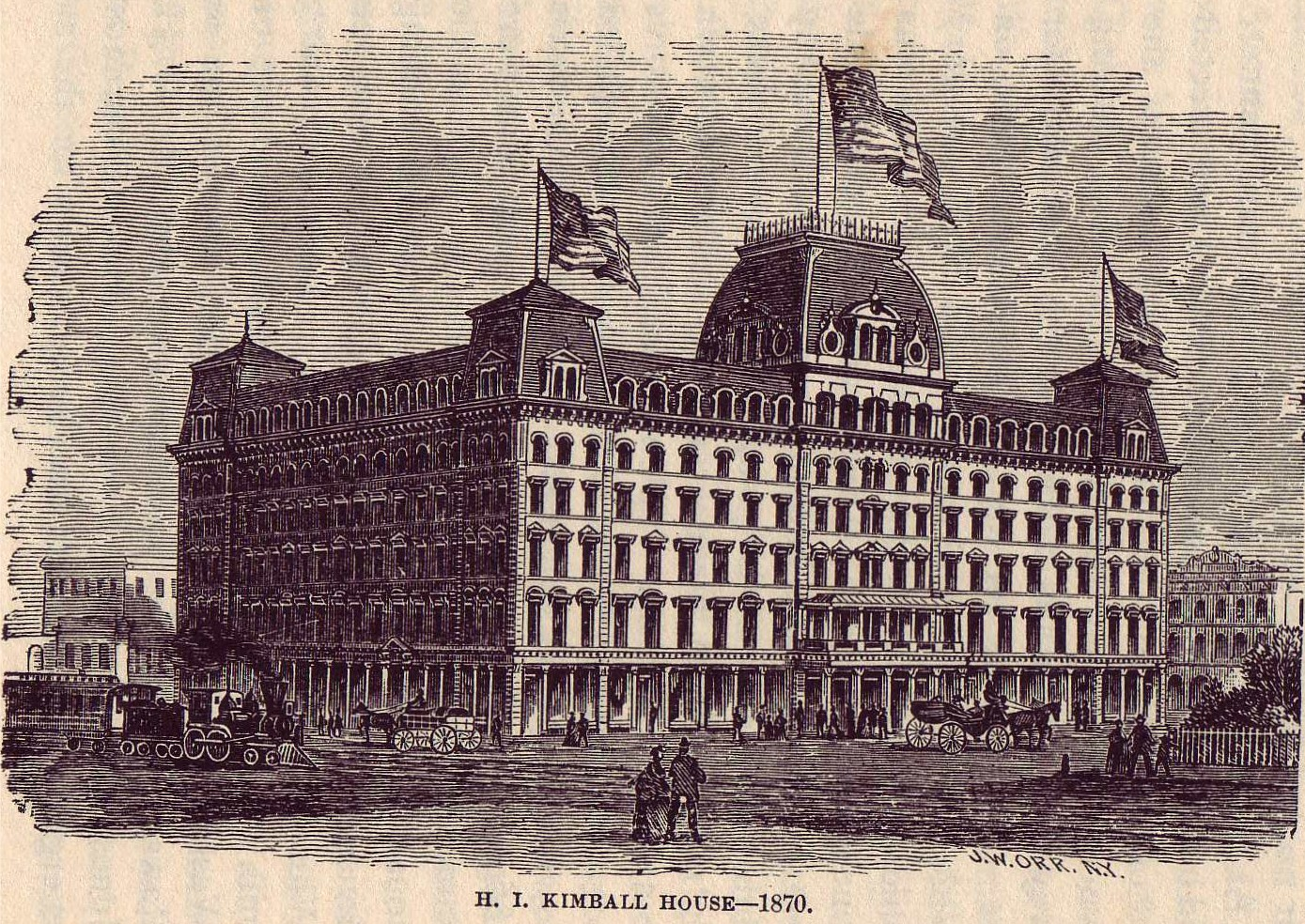
The first Kimball House was built of brick and painted yellow with brown trim.

Prior to the fair, Atlanta lacked suitable accommodations for visitors. On March 29 Kimball purchased the old Atlanta Hotel lot and built the "H.I. Kimball House" at a cost of $675,000. Wallace Putnam Reed, an Atlanta historian, once declared that it was "equal in all respects to the fifth Avenue Hotel in New York and far superior to anything in the South."

When the hotel was completed, Kimball turned his efforts toward improving the surrounding area. The area of Atlanta bounded by Pryor, Decator, Lloyd, and Alabama Streets was home to a decrepit railroad car shed. Another area known as the "Mitchell heir property" was reclaimed by the heirs of Robert Mitchell under protest of the government after the railroads abandoned the land. The city claimed that it had a right to the land since it was originally traded for a different property. Kimball, seeing the detriment to his own property by these other lands, paid the city for the lands and built a new rail depot.

== Railroads ==
Along with the depot, Kimball also built tracks along Alabama Street that resulted in the warehouse district moving to that location. He widened Pryor Street and constructed Wall Street. Capitalists came from cities including New York and Boston to invest in the area, leading to $100,000 in profit for Kimball.

Kimball was also active in railroad construction throughout Georgia and the South. At one point he was president of nine different railroad companies. By 1871, he had constructed some 300 miles (480 km) of track. Kimball lost most of his railroad interests shortly after the Great Chicago Fire in 1871.

== International Cotton Exposition of 1881 ==
Kimball did little in the years after his railroad business failed. Eventually he returned to the business scene and founded the Atlanta Cotton Factory. In 1880, a letter from Edward Adkinson of Boston was posted in the New York Herald suggesting that a cotton exposition be held in the South. Kimball seized on the idea and invited Adkinson to come to Atlanta and help him rally support. The state legislature soon agreed to the idea and made Kimball Director-General of the 1881 International Cotton Exposition.

== The New Kimball House ==
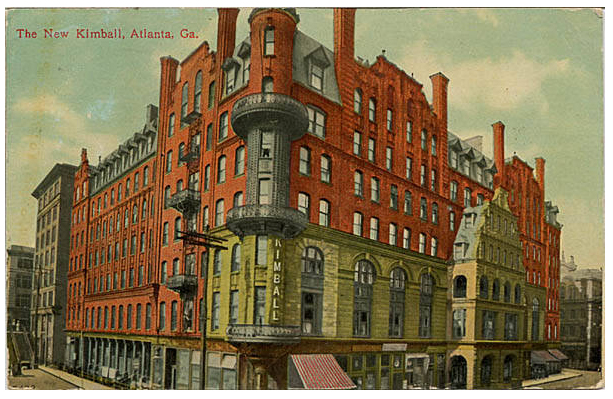
Postcard of the New Kimball House, c. 1912

Kimball was in Chicago, Illinois on August 12, 1883, when a letter arrived notifying him that the Kimball House had burned to the ground. The firefighters were able to contain the fire, and no other buildings and there were no deaths. By November 12, he began building a new hotel that was to be larger and finer than the previous one. The new H.I. Kimball House was completed on April 30, 1885.

Soon, at the dedication ceremony of the new chamber of commerce building, Kimball's friend Henry W. Grady proposed holding a great commercial exposition in the city within two months. Kimball was made chairman of the exposition, and traveled the country gaining support for the effort. The exposition commenced with over 500 delegates from 33 states who met in the DeGive's_Opera_House on April 19, 1885.

== Peters Park ==
In 1884, Kimball secured funding to purchase 200 acres (0.81 km^{2}) of land fronted on West Peachtree Street and running west along North Avenue to construct roads and housing. A company was organized to manage the property with Richard Peters as president and Kimball as general manager. Peters Park, what would have become Atlanta's first garden suburb, failed to sell, and the land would be donated and sold in 1887 to be the site of the Georgia Institute of Technology, then known as the Georgia School of Technology.

== Death ==
Hannibal Kimball died in Brookline, Massachusetts, on April 28, 1895.
