= John C. Peck =

John C. Peck (October 6, 1828 – unknown) was a businessman and building contractor from Atlanta, Georgia, United States. Peck is known for constructing some of Atlanta's most notable early buildings including the Kimball House hotels. He was also the Chief of the Department of Construction for the 1881 International Cotton Exposition under Director-General Hannibal Kimball.

== Early life ==
Peck was born on October 6, 1828, in Ellsworth, Connecticut, the son of George W. Peck and his wife Hannah. He was the fourth of seven children. He married Josephine Hoyt in 1853.
