= Peters Park (Atlanta) =

Coordinates: 33.774838°N 84.393518°W

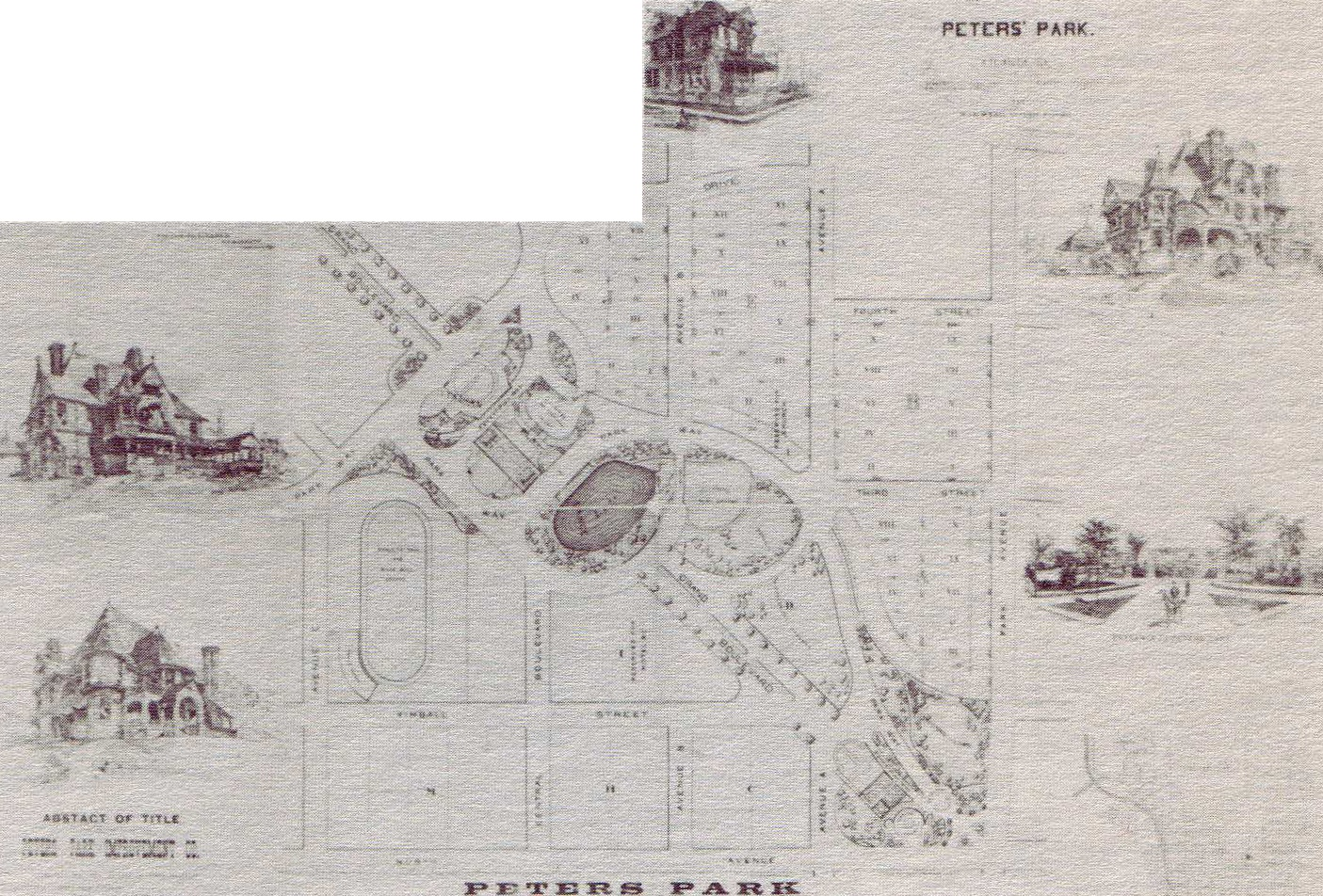
1884 plan for Peters Park

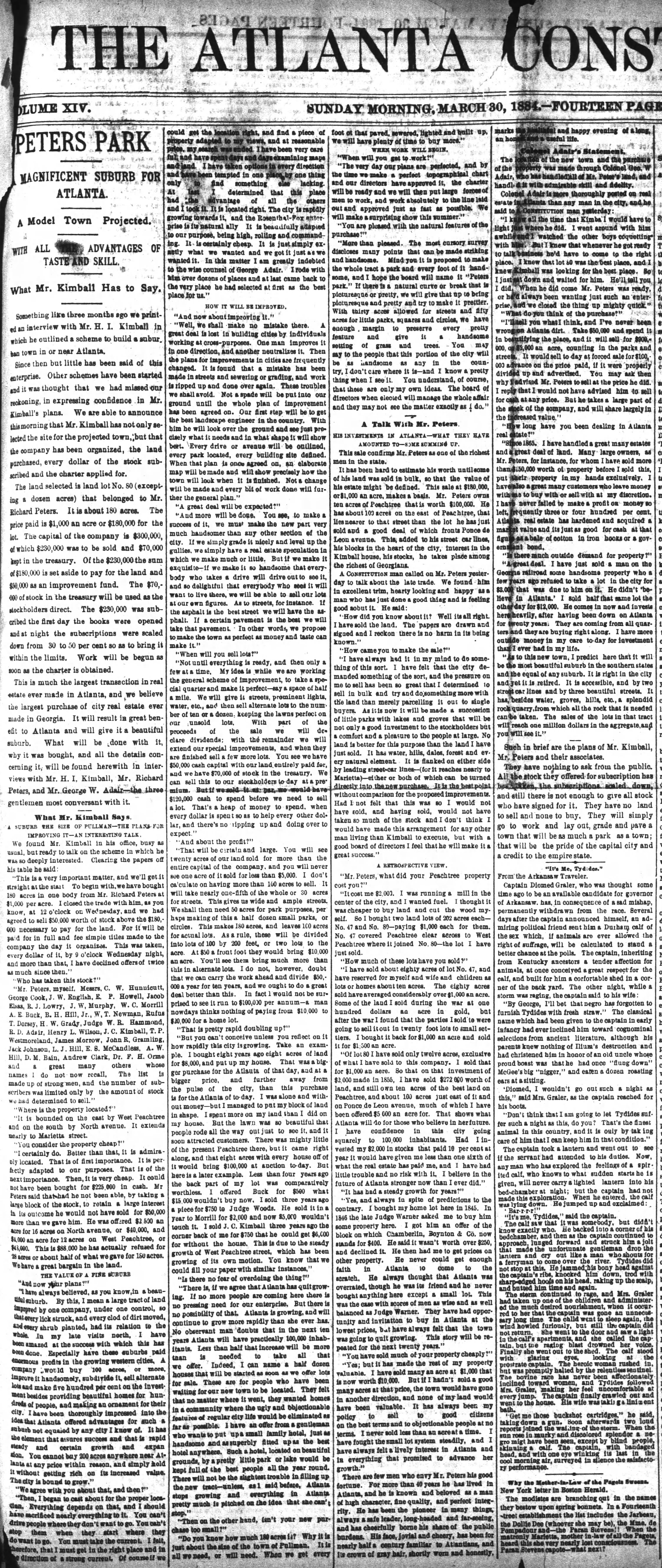
Front page Atlanta Constitution article from March 30, 1884 announcing plans for Peters Park

Peters Park was a planned but never realized neighborhood in Atlanta, Georgia, located on the site of today's Georgia Tech campus. Had the neighborhood actually been established in 1884-5, Peters Park would have been Atlanta's first garden suburb, preceding Inman Park, the first to feature winding roads, a lake and a planted boulevard.

== Organizers ==
The land was owned by Atlanta founder and railroad man Richard Peters, and the "model suburban town", as it was called then, was planned by Hannibal Kimball, who was behind the once-iconic Kimball House hotel and the 1881 International Cotton Exposition. Nathan Franklin Barrett was the nationally renowned landscape architect.

== Planned features ==
At one point the project was described as encompassing 216 acres (87 ha), out of which 142 would be lots, 48 would streets and 26 acres (11 ha), parks. (Other sources describe the project as 180 acres (73 ha). Peters Park would be accessible via the Peachtree or Marietta Street horsecar lines of the Atlanta Street Railway Company. Lots were improved by the land development company, a novelty for Atlanta at the time. By May 1885, $50,000 had been spent improving the neighborhood in anticipation of lot sales.

== Failure ==
The project failed — few lots were sold. Reasons attributed were the walking distance from the horsecar lines, high prices, and the onerous restrictions as to what could be built on the lots.

== Destination of land ==
In 1887 Peters offered to donate 4 acres (1.6 ha) fronting on North Avenue and Cherry Street as the site of the Technological School, which would become Georgia Tech, as an alternative to Boulevard and Grant Park, the two other sites being considered for the school. The offer was accepted, and Peters was able to sell an additional adjacent 4.75 acres (1.92 ha) of prime land for use by the school. The remainder of the Peters Park land would become the Hemphill Avenue (Home Park) neighborhood, roughly half of which was razed in the late 1960s to become part of the Georgia Tech campus.

== See also ==
- History of Georgia Tech
