= Richard Peters (Atlanta) =

American businessman

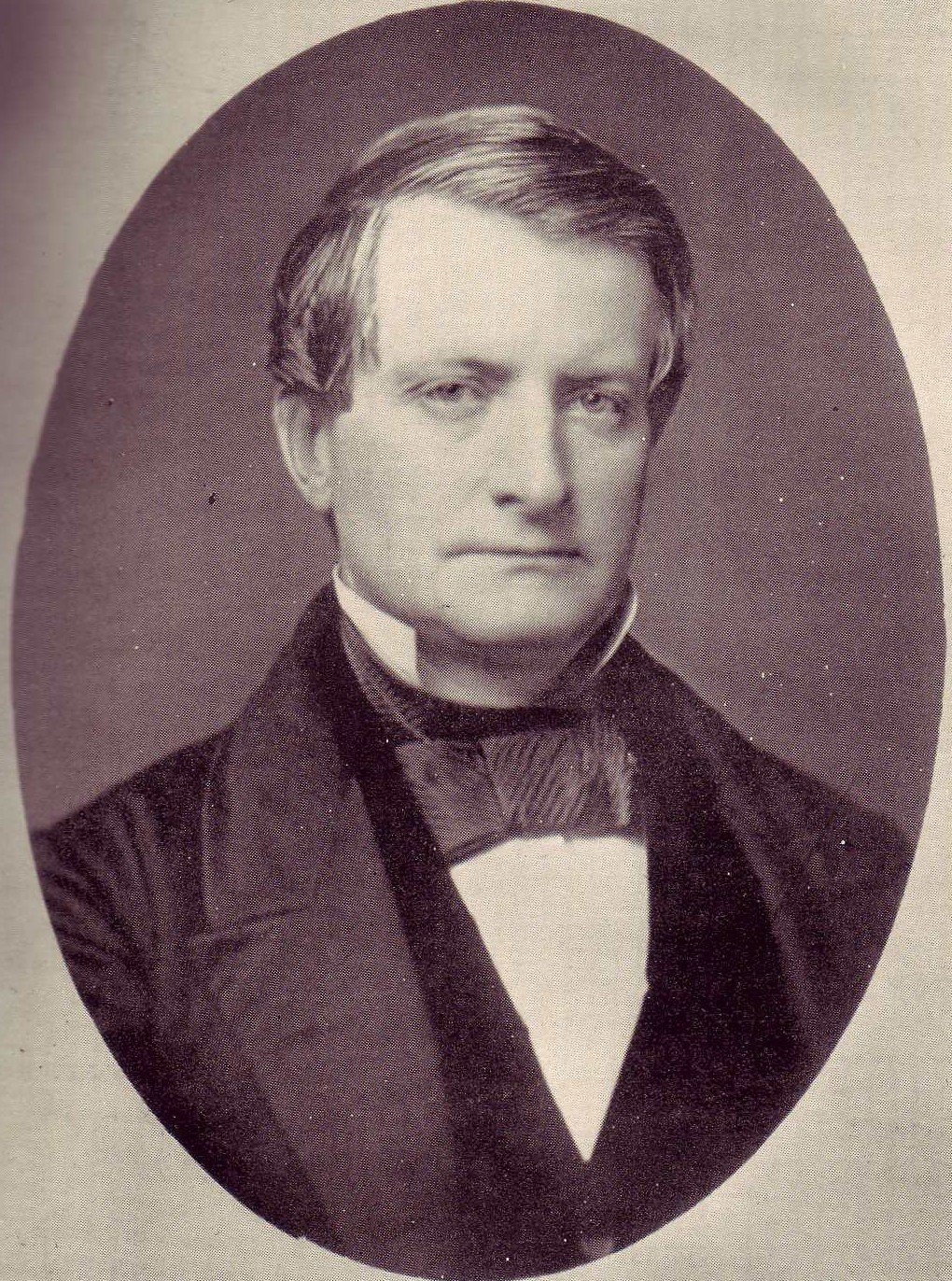
- Richard Peters in 1848
- Born: November 10, 1810; Germantown, Pennsylvania
- Died: February 6, 1889 (aged 78); Atlanta, Georgia
- Resting place: Oakland Cemetery
- Occupation: American businessman
- Spouse: Mary Jane Thompson (after 1848)
- Parent(s): Richard Peters; Abigail Willing Peters
- Relatives: Richard Peters (grandfather); Joseph Thompson (father-in-law)

Richard Peters (November 10, 1810 – February 6, 1889) was an American railroad man and a founder of Atlanta, Georgia, in the 1840s.

== Early life ==
Peters was born on November 10, 1810, near Philadelphia at Germantown, Pennsylvania. He was the son of Ralph Peters (1777–1842) and Catherine (Conyngham) Peters (1786–1839). His paternal grandfather was Judge Richard Peters (an associate of George Washington).

== Career ==
The young Peters was educated in Philadelphia. He worked with the architect William Strickland and as a rodman (surveyor) with John Edgar Thomson for $1.50 a day. Thomson liked the 26-year-old's work and in late 1834 offered him a job as chief engineer for $1,000 a year to help with construction of the new Georgia Railroad.

Peters paid $100 for a rough paddlewheeler trip into camp near Charleston, South Carolina, in the brutally cold February 1835. He worked on the state railroad for the eight years it took to complete it from Augusta, to the new town of Marthasville, Georgia. During this period, he developed what became a lifelong friendship with Lemuel Grant; they both bought land in the new town.

When the railroad was completed, Peters was hired as superintendent. In that position he heard many complaints about the name Marthasville, which people thought took too long to write in log books, freight records, etc. He traded letters with Thomson on the subject and, when the latter suggested Atlanta, Peters began printing up thousands of circulars to distribute from Augusta to Tennessee advertising the new name. It was officially changed in December 1845.

=== Atlanta years ===
Peters founded the first Atlanta steam factory, a flour mill at the Georgia RR between Butler and Calhoun streets (the location of today's Sloppy Floyd office building). Lacking a water power source, the mill had to be powered by wood. Peters purchased 405 acres (1.64 km^{2}), the land lots 80 and 47, for $2,000 to serve as a lumber lot for pine wood. This area later developed as Midtown, between North Avenue and 8th Street. Later development of this land in the city proved to be the key to Peters' future wealth.

Always interested in transportation, Peters had operated a stage coach line between Atlanta and Montgomery, Alabama. After completion of the Atlanta & West Point Railroad, he moved the northern end to West Point, Georgia, and extended it to Montgomery.

Also an avid livestock breeder and horticulturist, in 1854 he established a nursery in Atlanta.

=== Civil War ===
In early 1861, he sold the steam engine from his mill for $12,000 to be used in the Confederate Powderworks at Augusta. He was the civilian transportation agent for all Atlanta railroads, which were critical to supplying the Confederacy. He contracted with the blockade running Crenshaw Company, supplying cotton by rail in exchange for foodstuffs. During the American Civil War, Peters remained in Atlanta until a few days before the invasion of Union General Sherman's army.

By the time of the Battle of Atlanta, he and his family had moved to Augusta, where they stayed until April 1865. After Sherman left Georgia in December 1864, Peters hired James R. Crew to repair the 24 miles (39 km) of destroyed Atlanta and West Point Rail Road; Lemuel Grant worked to repair the nearly 100 miles (160 km) of wrecked Georgia Railroad. By April, the war was over, and rail service was restored to Atlanta.

=== Postbellum years ===
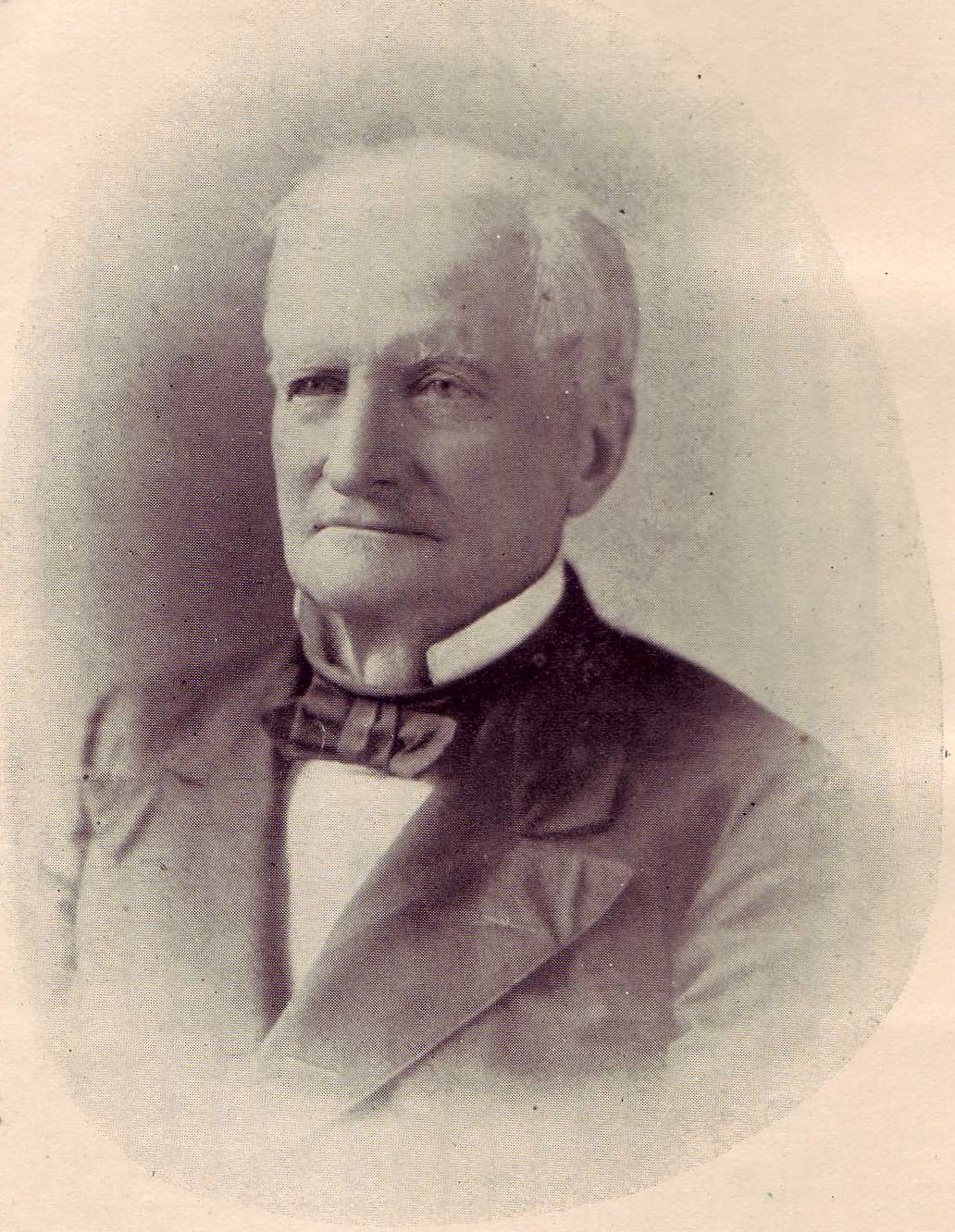
Richard Peters in 1889

In 1871 Peters built Atlanta's first street railway, Atlanta Street Railway Company, with the real estate developer George Adair.

After the Kimball House was destroyed by fire, Peters helped lead the efforts to have that center of Atlanta life rebuilt. He invited Hanniball Kimball back to town to help raise money.

Peters would do even more for Atlanta. His influence considerably cushioned the impact of Reconstruction in Atlanta. He planned and successfully maneuvered the transfer of the state capitol from Milledgeville to Atlanta after the war and donated the land on which the Georgia capitol building sits.

With new migrants flocking to the boomtown of Atlanta, Peters began to subdivide his north Atlanta land, first by laying out roads: north/south streets were named by trees (myrtle, juniper, apple, etc.) to match the naming of Peachtree Street. He threw in Penn to harken back to his Pennsylvania roots. The east/west streets were numbered, starting with 3rd Street (since North Avenue and Ponce de León were long-since named) and ending with the northernmost extent of his property, 8th Street.

He built his final home on the highest part of his land: the block bounded by Peachtree, 4th, Cypress and 5th streets. In 1884 Peters sold 180 acres (0.73 km^{2}) surrounding West Peachtree to Kimball for $1,000 an acre to create Peters Park, a development that eventually failed for lack of sales. In 1887 he sold 5 acres (20,000 m^{2}) of his remaining holdings to the state for $10,000 and donated another four acres to help found the Georgia School of Technology.

== Personal life ==
In 1848, Peters built a home in Atlanta and was married to Mary Jane Thompson, the daughter of the early settler and doctor, Joseph Thompson, and his wife. Together, Richard and Mary Jane had several children together, including: Richard, Edward, Ralph, Nellie, who all became prominent.

Peters died on February 6, 1889, and was buried in Oakland Cemetery in Atlanta.

=== Legacy ===
He left a million-dollar estate. Of his two sons, Edward stayed on the estate and built Ivy Hall, now listed on the National Register of Historic Places. Ralph moved to New York, where he became president of the Long Island Rail Road.
