= John Rice (banker) =

John Rice (b. about 1832, Massachusetts) was the first president of the Georgia National Bank in 1865. He was noted as having Atlanta's highest income in 1868 at $35,127. He departed the city a few years thereafter when the bank ceased operations.
