= Georgia National Bank =

This article incorporates text from a publication now in the public domain: History of Atlanta, Georgia by Wallace Putnam Reed (1889)

The Georgia National Bank was a bank in Atlanta, Georgia, commissioned by the United States government in the Fall of 1865. The officers at that time were John Rice, president, E. L. Jones, cashier, E. E. Rawson, judge William Wirt Clayton, S. A. Durand, and judge John Collier, directors. The capital stock was $100,000, divided into 1,000 shares, a majority of which was held by John Rice. The stock remained in the hands of the same parties until 1870 when Hannibal Kimball purchased 800 shares. The bank was the depository of the State of Georgia during Governor Rufus Bullock's administration. On February 6, 1872, a suit was brought against the bank to recover the money which it was claimed belonged to the state and was unlawfully held. At the time of bringing this suit, the bank stock was held by S. A. Lapham, who held one-half of the stock, and others. The legal fight to regain possession of the state funds held by the bank was carried to the United States Supreme Court and forms one of the most interesting cases in the legal history of the city. As a consequence of this controversy, the bank was forced to suspend operations and never resumed business.
