= Savannah College of Art and Design =

Private art school in Georgia, U.S.

Coordinates: 32.0730°N 81.0961°W

- Motto: Ars longa, vita brevis
- Motto in English: Art is long, life is short
- Type: Private art school
- Established: 1978; 48 years ago
- Accreditation: SACS
- Endowment: $412 million (2026)
- President: Paula S. Wallace
- Faculty: 768 full-time, 90 part-time
- Students: 18,550 (fall 2024)
- Undergraduates: 15,552 (fall 2024)
- Postgraduates: 2,998 (fall 2024)
- Location: Savannah and Atlanta, Georgia, U.S.; Lacoste, France
- Campus: Urban
- Colors: Gold & black
- Nickname: Bees
- Sporting affiliations: NAIA – The Sun (Savannah); NAIA – Appalachian (Atlanta)
- Mascot: Art the Bee
- Website: scad.edu
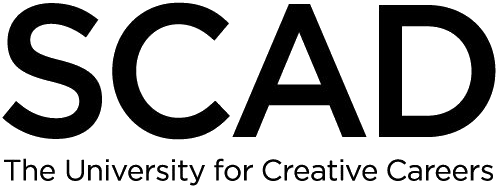

Savannah College of Art and Design (SCAD) is a private art school with locations in Savannah and Atlanta, Georgia, United States, and Lacoste, France. It was founded in 1978 to provide degrees in programs not then offered in the Southeast United States and to create a specialized professional art college to attract students from throughout the United States and abroad. The university enrolls more than 17,000 students from across the United States and around the world with international students comprising up to 25.4 percent of the student population. SCAD is accredited by the Southern Association of Colleges and Schools Commission on Colleges and other professional accrediting bodies.

== History ==
Richard G. Rowan, Paula S. Wallace, May L. Poetter and Paul E. Poetter legally incorporated the Savannah College of Art and Design September 29, 1978. In September 1979, the university first began offering classes with four staff members, seven faculty members, and 71 students. Initially, the school offered eight majors: ceramics, graphic design, historic preservation, textile design, interior design, painting, photography, and printmaking. In May 1981, the first graduate received a degree. The following year, the first graduating class received degrees. In 1982, the enrollment grew to more than 500 students, then to 1,000 in 1986, and 2,000 in 1989. In 2014, the university enrolled more than 11,000 students.

In the late 1980s and early 1990s, a rash of faculty suicides prompted a nervous reaction from school administrators. The unrest led a competing art school to open downtown, igniting an "all-out war."

Student unrest grew in the early 1990s regarding student representation within the school, culminating in 1992 with the detonation of an explosive device at the administration building, and two more later that year, at the Savannah Civic Center.

SCAD opened a study abroad location in Lacoste, France in 2002 that provides programming for the various academic departments offered by the university's degree-granting locations. It launched an online learning program in 2003 that U.S. News & World Report ranks as among the best for bachelor's programs in the nation. In 2005 the university opened a location in Midtown Atlanta that merged with the Atlanta College of Art in 2006. In September 2010, SCAD opened a Hong Kong location in the Sham Shui Po district.

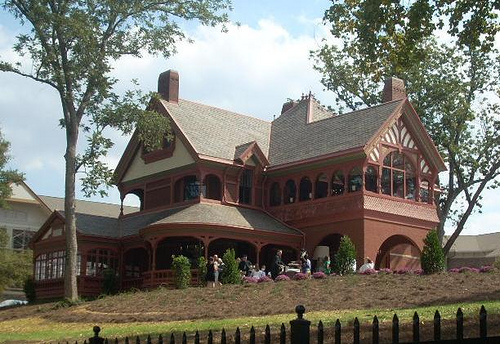
Ivy Hall houses classrooms for SCAD's Atlanta campus

Richard Rowan (who was married to Paula Wallace at the time) served as president of the college from its inception in 1978 until April 2000, when SCAD's board of trustees promoted him to chancellor. As chancellor, Rowan spent most of his time traveling and recruiting international students and staff. In 2001, he resigned the job and left the college.

Paula S. Wallace is the current president. Wallace, formerly Paula S. Rowan, served as SCAD's provost and dean of academics before becoming president. As president, Wallace directs the internal management of the institution. Wallace has led the collaboration for several annual events, such as the Sidewalk Arts Festival, Savannah Film Festival, a Fashion Show, SCAD Style, deFine Art Festival, Art Educators' Forum and Rising Star. Questions have been raised about the unusual pay packages granted to Wallace and her family. Paula Wallace received $9.6 million in compensation in 2014, and 13 members of her family have received $60 million over the past 20 years.

The university's second museum, SCAD FASH Museum of Fashion + Film, opened in 2015, at SCAD Atlanta.

In 2018, a student started a petition calling for better mental health services for students after two suicides occurred after the beginning of the 2018 academic year. In 2019, SCAD increased the number of professional counseling staff and created Bee Well, which provides virtual and physical counseling, wellness workshops, and a 24/7 toll-free emotional support hotline.

In March 2020, in response to the COVID-19 pandemic, SCAD transitioned to entirely virtual learning for all students, while allowing international students and others to remain in residence halls following social distancing protocols.

In June 2020, SCAD discontinued studies at its Hong Kong location, citing concerns about student safety and academic quality following the 2019–20 Hong Kong protests and the COVID-19 pandemic. The North Kowloon Magistracy was returned to the city.

In June 2020, in the midst of Black Lives Matter protests around the U.S., SCAD created an office of inclusion and announced related initiatives to address systemic racism, including the addition of 15 endowed scholarships for Black students.

== Campus ==
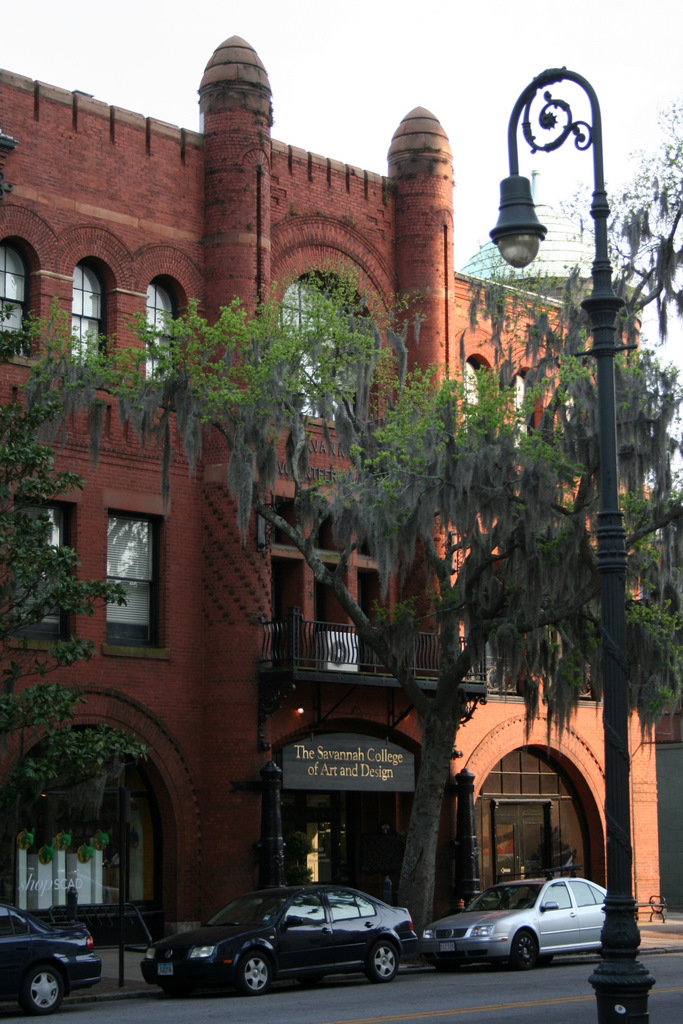
Poetter Hall, originally Preston Hall, was SCAD's first building and first historic restoration project.

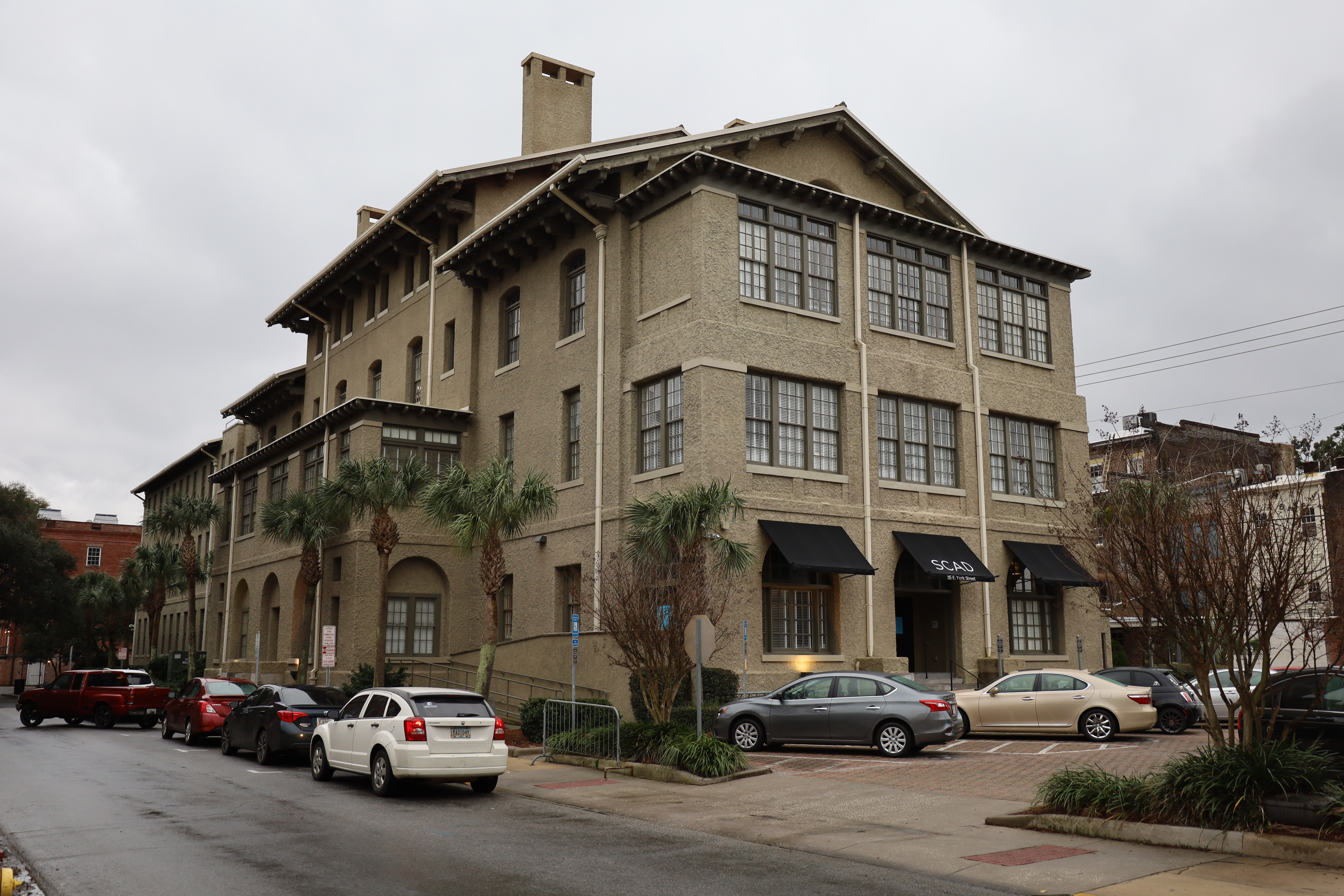
Bradley Hall was formerly a United States Marine Hospital.

=== Facilities ===
SCAD's efforts to work with the city of Savannah to preserve its architectural heritage include restoring buildings for use as college facilities, for which it has been recognized by the American Institute of Architects, the National Trust for Historic Preservation, the Historic Savannah Foundation and the Victorian Society of America. The college campus includes 67 buildings throughout the grid-and-park system of downtown Savannah. Many buildings are on the 22 squares of the old town, which are laden with monuments, live oaks and a Southern-Gothic feel.

Located in Atlanta's Midtown, SCAD Atlanta includes classroom and exhibition space, computer labs, library, photography darkrooms, printmaking and sculpture studios, a dining hall, fitness center, swimming pool and residence hall. SCAD Atlanta's Ivy Hall (also known as the Edward C. Peters House) opened in 2008 after extensive restoration. In 2009, SCAD Atlanta opened the Digital Media Center.

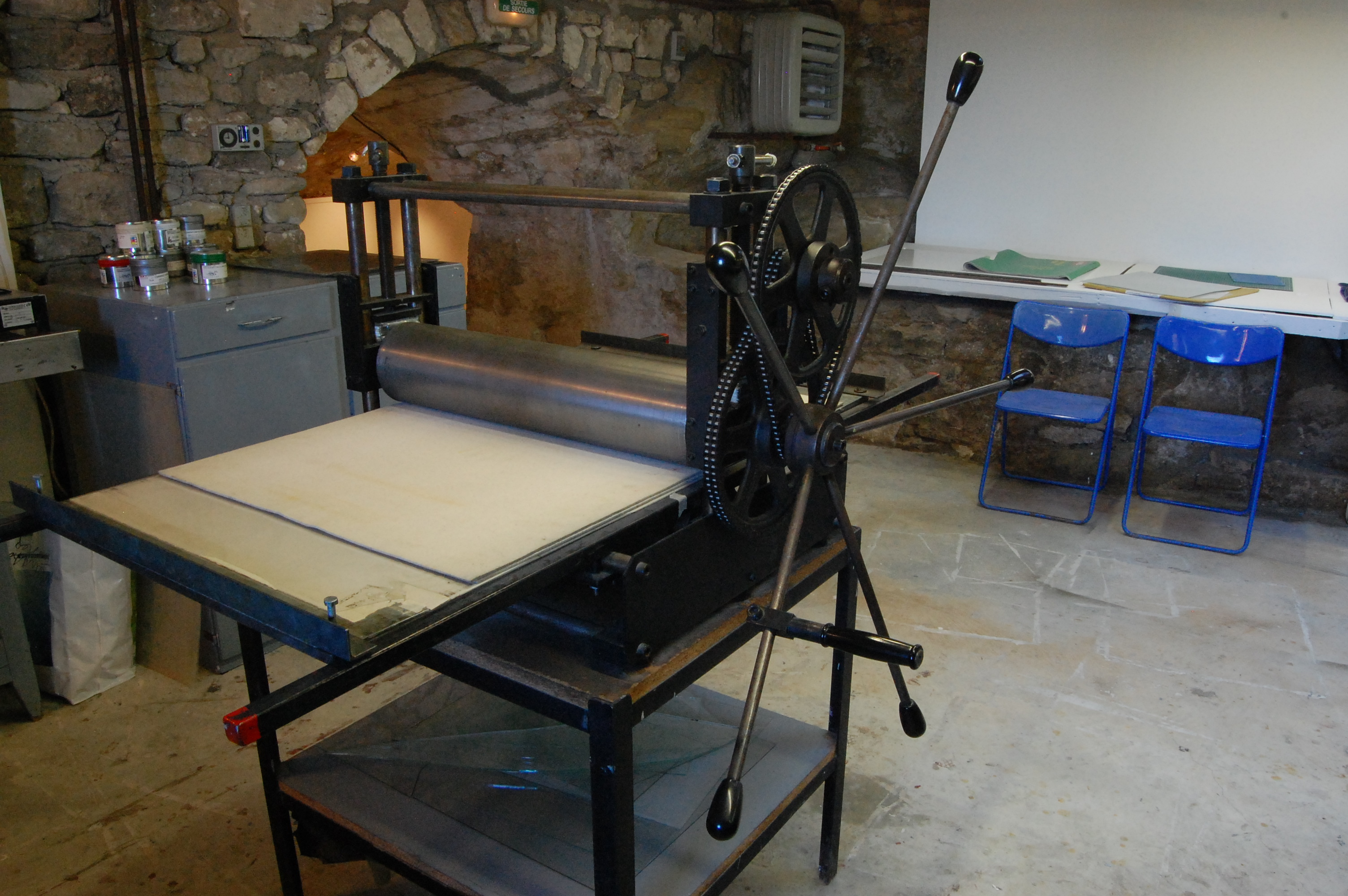
Cylinder press in the Atelier de Gravure at SCAD Lacoste

The SCAD Lacoste campus is made up of 15th- and 16th-century structures. The campus includes an art gallery, guest houses, computer lab and printmaking lab. In Hong Kong, SCAD occupied the renovated historic North Kowloon Magistracy Building, with more than 80,000 square feet (7,400 m^{2}). It was equipped with classrooms, meeting areas, computer labs, an art gallery and library. The Hong Kong campus was closed in June 2020 after 10 years in the city.

The college's first academic building was the Savannah Volunteer Guards Armory, which was purchased and renovated in 1979. Built in 1892, the Romanesque Revival red brick structure is included on the National Register of Historic Places. Originally named Preston Hall, the building was renamed Poetter Hall in honor of co-founders May and Paul Poetter. SCAD soon expanded rapidly, acquiring buildings in Savannah's downtown historic and Victorian districts, restoring old and often derelict buildings that had exhausted their original functions.

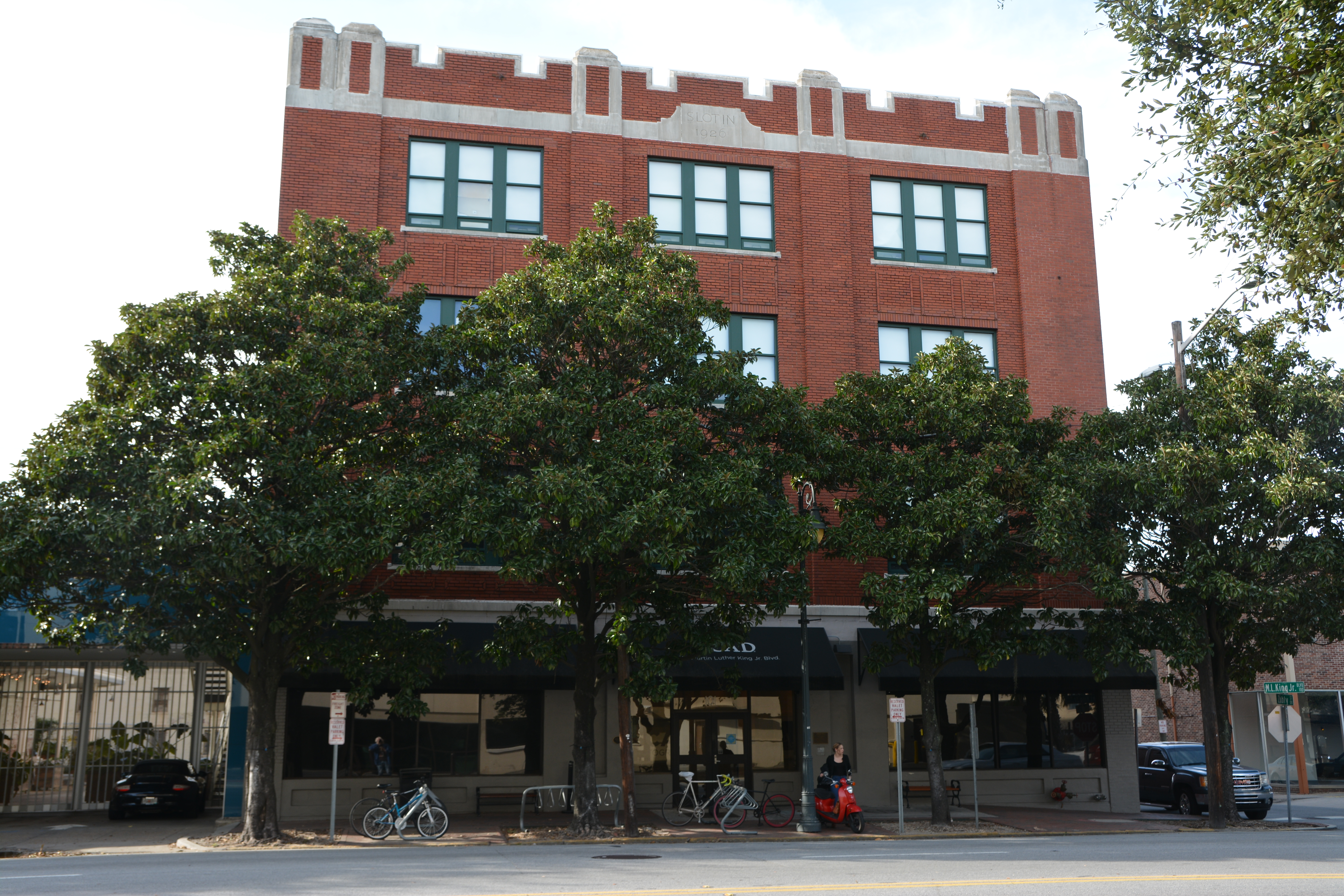
Herstand Hall

The college operates three libraries: Jen Library in Savannah, Georgia; ACA Library in Atlanta, Georgia; and Lacoste Library in Lacoste, France. Extensive resources are also available via the eLearning Library.

The most notable of the group is Jen Library for the size of its collection. The Jen Library houses approximately 42,000 books, 11,000 bound volumes of periodicals, and 1,600 videotapes in an 85,000 square foot building. The building, itself, once served as a Maas Brothers department store before being acquired and repurposed by the university. Its structural and design features include a large glass staircase and floor-to-ceiling windows on opposite corners of the building. The Jen Library houses multiple rare collections containing both books and visual arts materials including the Don Bluth Collection of Animation and the Newton Collection of British and American Art. It is also home to the Gutstein Gallery, an assemblage of contemporary art from both nationally recognized artists as well as SCAD alumni.

In April 2021, the college announced plans of expanding its film and digital media studio, which would make it the largest college movie studio in the country. Plans included a new digital stage and three new soundstages housed at a 10.9-acre backlot.

=== Student housing ===
In Atlanta, the university provides three residence halls, ACA Residence Hall of SCAD, Brookwood Courtyard, and the Forty. Prior to the closure of the campus, the Hong Kong residence halls were located at the Hong Kong Gold Coast residences. The residence halls in Savannah are Ann Street, Barnard Village, Boundary Village, Montgomery House, Oglethorpe House, Turner House, Chatham House, the Victory Village complex consisting of Sand, Sail, and Surf at Victory Village, and The Hive student housing complex, consisting of Apiary, Bumble, Colony, Dance, Everest, Flower, Garden, and Honey at The Hive. Students in Lacoste live in Maison Pitot, Fortunee, Renard, Murier, Olivier, and Basse.

=== Museums and galleries ===
SCAD operates museums, galleries, and exhibition spaces across its campuses, including the SCAD Museum of Art, located on the site of the former Central of Georgia Railway headquarters in Savannah, Georgia, and SCAD FASH Museum of Fashion + Film in Atlanta, Georgia. Rafael Gomes is the director of fashion exhibitions and has curated several shows including ‘Robert Fairer Backstage Pass: Dior, Galliano, Jacobs, and McQueen.'

University galleries include Gutstein Gallery, Pinnacle Gallery and La Galerie Bleue in Savannah; Gallery 1600, Trois Gallery and Gallery See in Atlanta.

== Academics ==
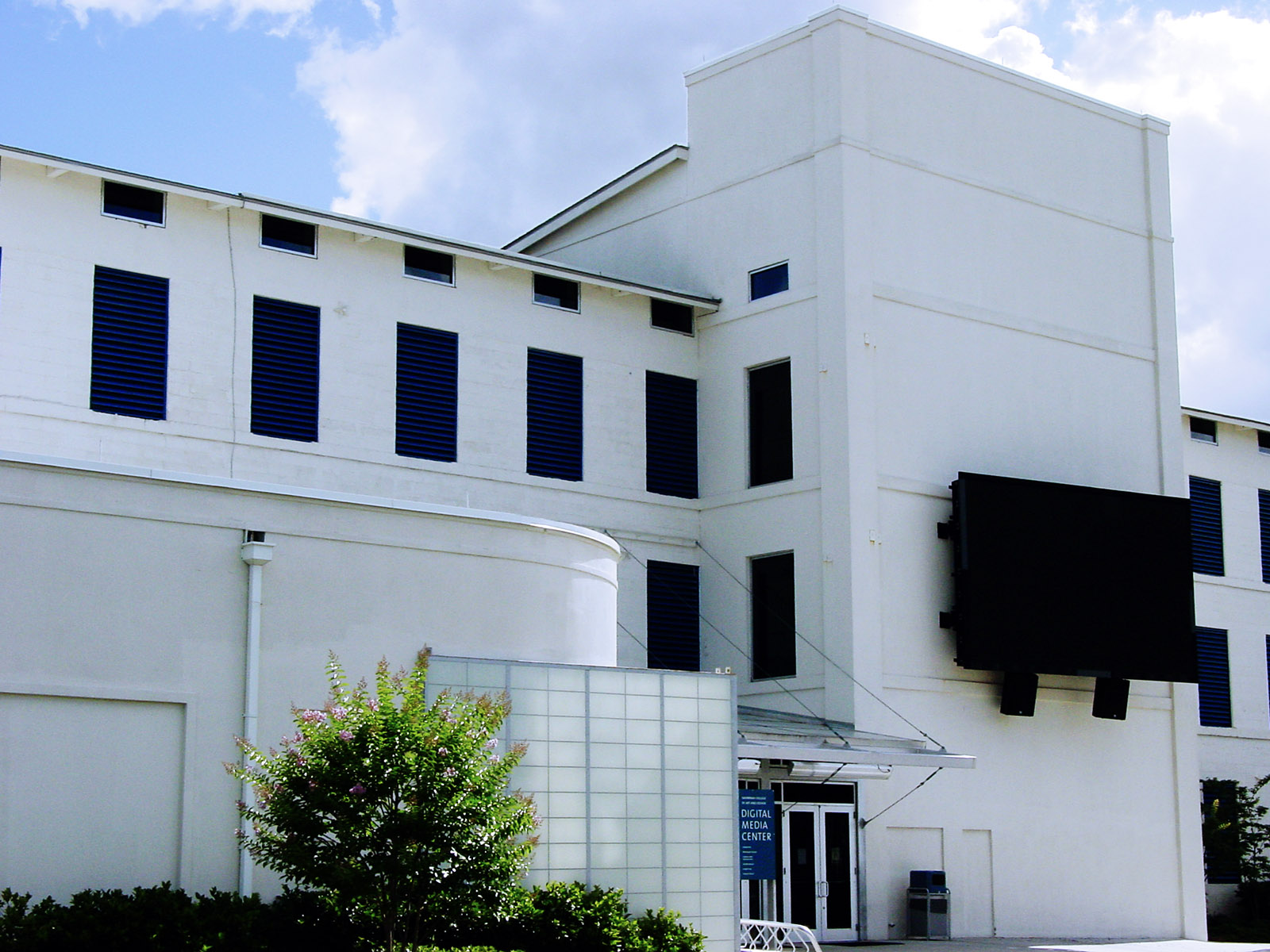
Montgomery Hall is home of Animation, Broadcast Design and Motion Graphics, Interactive Design and Game Development, and Visual Effects

In Fall 2023, SCAD enrolled more than 17,000 students (14,657 undergraduates; 2,918 postgraduates) from all 50 states, and more than 110 countries. As of Fall 2025, international student enrollment was 25.4 percent.

=== Rankings ===
SCAD is recognized for educational and professional excellence by numerous ranking organizations. Recognitions include, without limitation, the following. In 2025, SCAD was ranked the No.1 design university in the Americas and Europe in the prestigious Red Dot Design Award Rankings. It was also ranked in the top five universities globally. The ranking recognizes excellence in teaching and exceptional performance in design. The university’s top-ranked disciplines included industrial design, fashion design, user experience design, fibers, accessory design, furniture design, and interactive design and game development. Students and graduates also won three coveted “Best of the Best” awards and 23 individual Red Dot Design Awards. Also in 2025, U.S. News & World Report ranked SCAD No.37 in Best Value Schools, No.6 in Best Undergraduate Teaching, and No.2 in Most Innovative Schools, Art & Object magazine ranked SCAD the No.1 Best Art School in the U.S., it was ranked No.1 in Forbes' Best Colleges Shaping the Future of Fashion, SCAD was named the top interior design school by Architectural Digest, and it was ranked a top 13 Art and Design university in the world by QS World University Rankings.

=== Accreditation ===
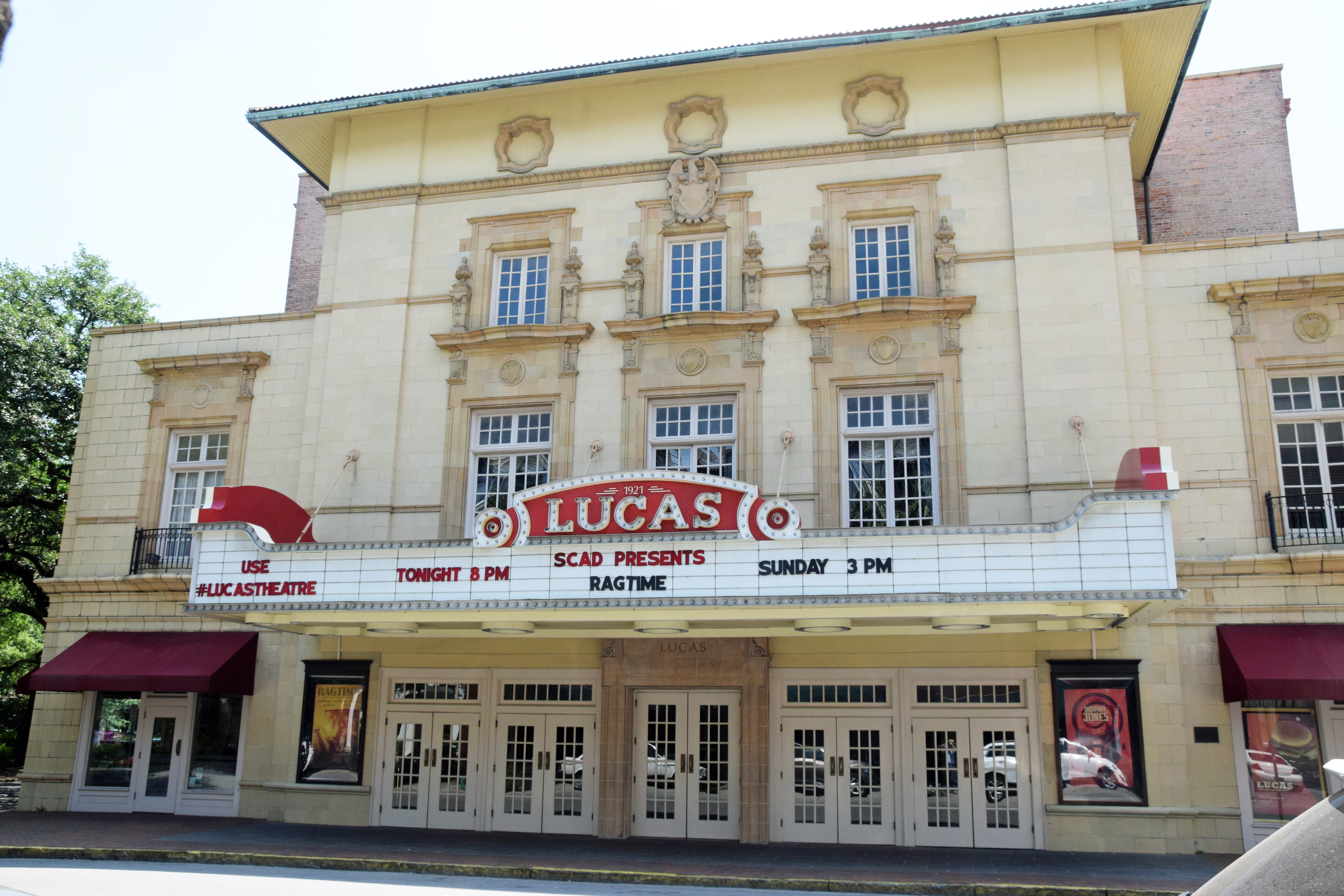
Lucas Theatre

SCAD is accredited by the Commission on Colleges of the Southern Association of Colleges and Schools to award bachelor's and master's degrees. The university confers Bachelor of Arts, Bachelor of Fine Arts, Master of Architecture, Master of Arts, Master of Arts in Teaching, Master of Fine Arts and Master of Urban Design degrees, as well as undergraduate and graduate certificates. The professional M.Arch. degree is accredited by the National Architectural Accrediting Board. The Master of Arts in Teaching degrees offered by SCAD are approved by the Georgia Professional Standards Commission. SCAD is licensed by the South Carolina Commission on Higher Education. The SCAD interior design Bachelor of Fine Arts degree is accredited by the Council for Interior Design Accreditation.

=== Study abroad ===
The university offers a study-abroad campus in Lacoste, France. In Fall 2010, SCAD opened SCAD Hong Kong in the former North Kowloon Magistracy. The Hong Kong campus was closed in June 2020. SCAD students in Hong Kong were given the option to transfer to other SCAD campuses if they wanted to continue their studies.

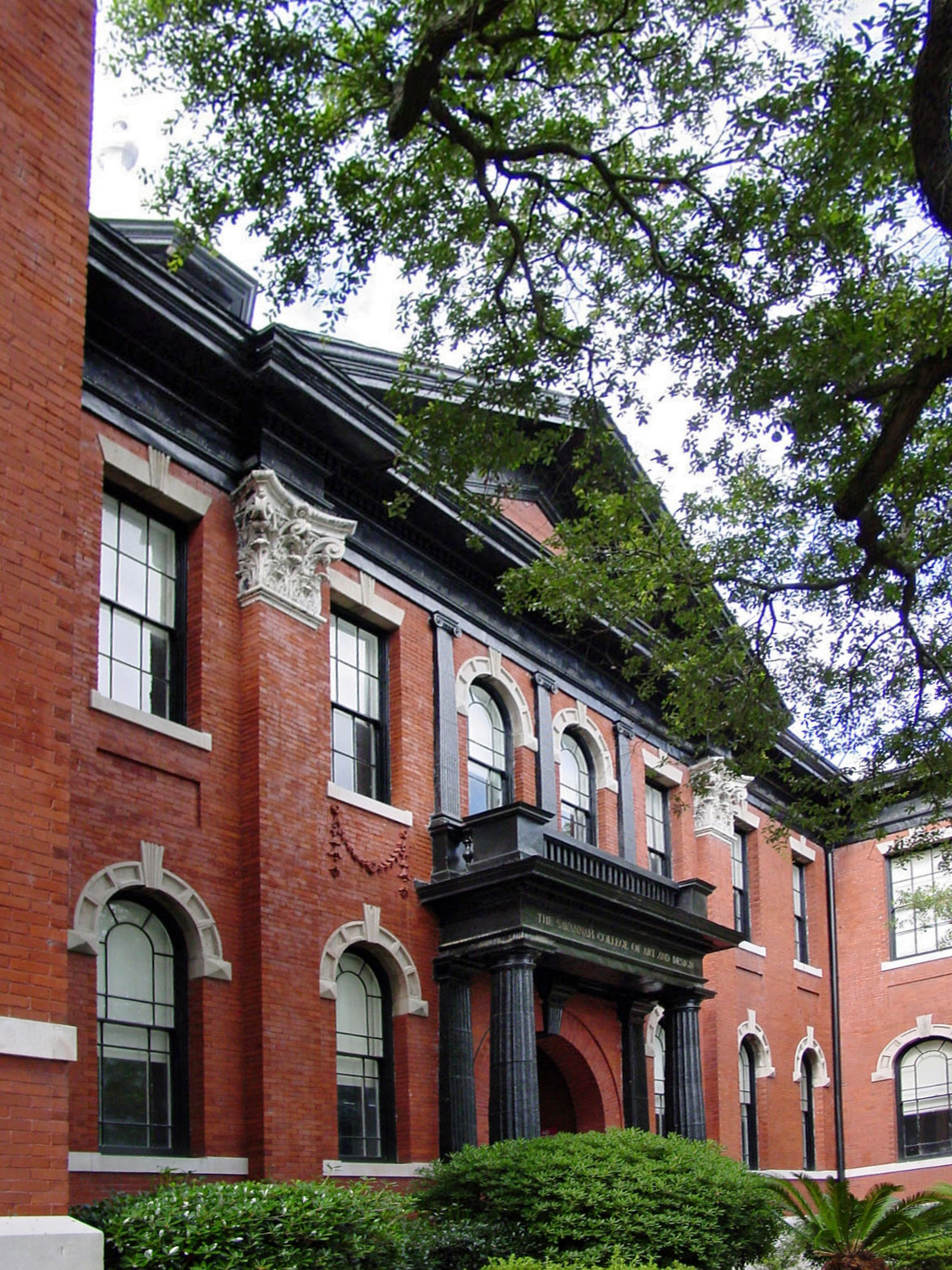
Anderson Hall

=== Schools and departments ===
The university is divided into eleven schools:

- School of Animation & Motion
- School of Building Arts
- The De Sole School of Business Innovation
- School of Creative Technology
- School of Design
- School of Fashion
- School of Film & Acting
- School of Fine Arts
- School of Foundation Studies
- School of Liberal Arts
- School of Visual Communication

== Student activities ==
There are 80 student organizations related to academic and non-academic programs and activities. SCAD has no fraternities or sororities.

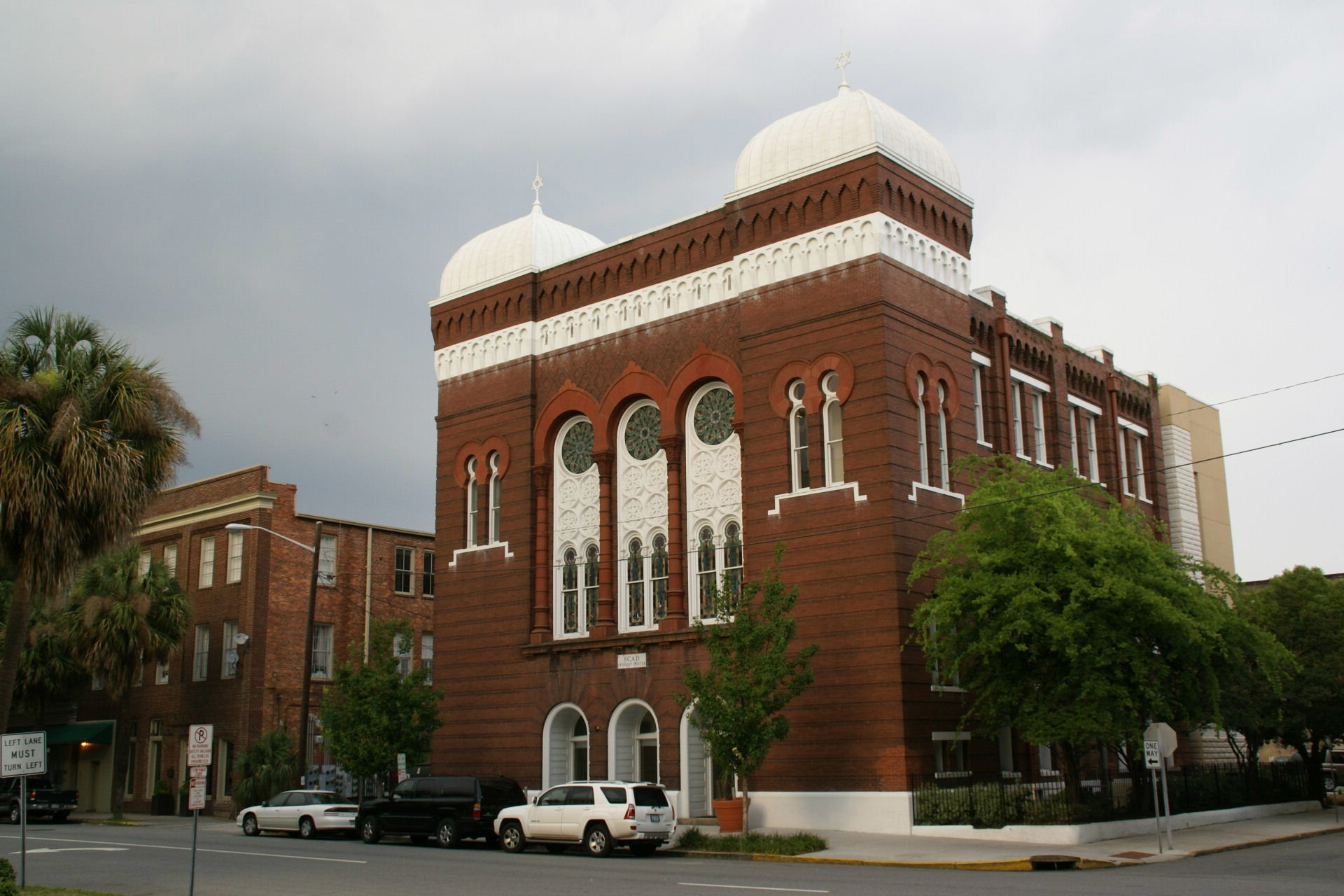
Student center of the Savannah College of Art and Design, a former synagogue

=== Student media ===
The university has multiple student-run media organizations at its Savannah and Atlanta locations.

Savannah

- District, an online-only news publication, in print from 1995 to 2008
- The Manor, an online fashion magazine published since 2014
- Port City Review, an annual literary and arts journal published since 2013
- The HoneyDripper, a sequential art and illustration blog published since 2016
- SCAD Radio, an online webcasting station broadcasting since 2002
- Women's Empowerment Club (WEC), discussion based group dedicated to intersectional feminism and social awareness

Atlanta

- The Connector, an online-only news publication, in print from 2006 to 2008
- SCAN Magazine, a quarterly general interest magazine published since 2009
- SCAD Atlanta Radio, an online webcasting station broadcasting since 2007
- SCADMC, an online gaming media experience since 2024

== Athletics ==
=== SCAD Savannah Bees ===
The athletic teams of the SCAD Savannah campus are called the Bees. The college is a member of the National Association of Intercollegiate Athletics (NAIA), primarily competing in the Sun Conference (formerly known as the Florida Sun Conference (FSC) until after the 2007–08 school year) since the 2004–05 academic year; The Bees previously competed as an NAIA Independent during the 2003–04 school year (which they were a member on a previous stint from 1987–88 (when the school began intercollegiate athletics) to 1991–92); as well as a member of the Division III ranks of the National Collegiate Athletic Association (NCAA) as an NCAA D-III Independent from 1992–93 to 2002–03.

SCAD Savannah competes in 22 intercollegiate varsity sports. Men's sports include bowling, cross country, cycling, golf, lacrosse, soccer, swimming, tennis and track & field (indoor and outdoor); while women's sports include bowling, cross country, cycling, golf, lacrosse, soccer, swimming, tennis and track & field (indoor and outdoor); and co-ed sports include equestrian and eSports. Former sports included men's & women's basketball, cheerleading and co-ed fishing.

Club/intramural sports

Fencing is offered as a club sport. Opportunities for athletics participation also exist through the college's intramural programs. Volleyball, beach volleyball, basketball, soccer, flag football, softball and various other activities are available at the intramural level.

NCAA to NAIA

On June 17, 2003, Savannah College of Art and Design executive vice president Brian Murphy and athletic director Jud Damon announced that the university would be changing athletic affiliation from the Division III ranks of the NCAA and re-joining the NAIA. SCAD had been a Division III member since 1992, but would now be joining the Florida Sun Conference. The college was a member of the NAIA from 1987 to 1992 and renewed membership in the NAIA and the FSC (now the Sun Conference) beginning with the 2003–04 season.

=== SCAD Atlanta Bees ===
The athletic teams of the SCAD Atlanta campus are likewise called the Bees. The college is a member of the National Association of Intercollegiate Athletics (NAIA), primarily competing in the Appalachian Athletic Conference (AAC) since the 2012–13 academic year; after spending two seasons as an NAIA Independent within the Association of Independent Institutions (AII) from 2010–11 (when the school began intercollegiate athletics and joined the NAIA) to 2011–12.

SCAD Savannah competes in 16 intercollegiate varsity sports. Men's sports include bowling, cross country, cycling, fencing, golf, tennis and track & field (indoor and outdoor); while women's sports include bowling, cross country, cycling, fencing, golf, tennis and track & field (indoor and outdoor).

Origins

In 2010, SCAD Atlanta entered the NAIA in men's and women's golf, men's and women's tennis and men's and women's cross country.

== Annual events ==
=== Savannah Film Festival ===
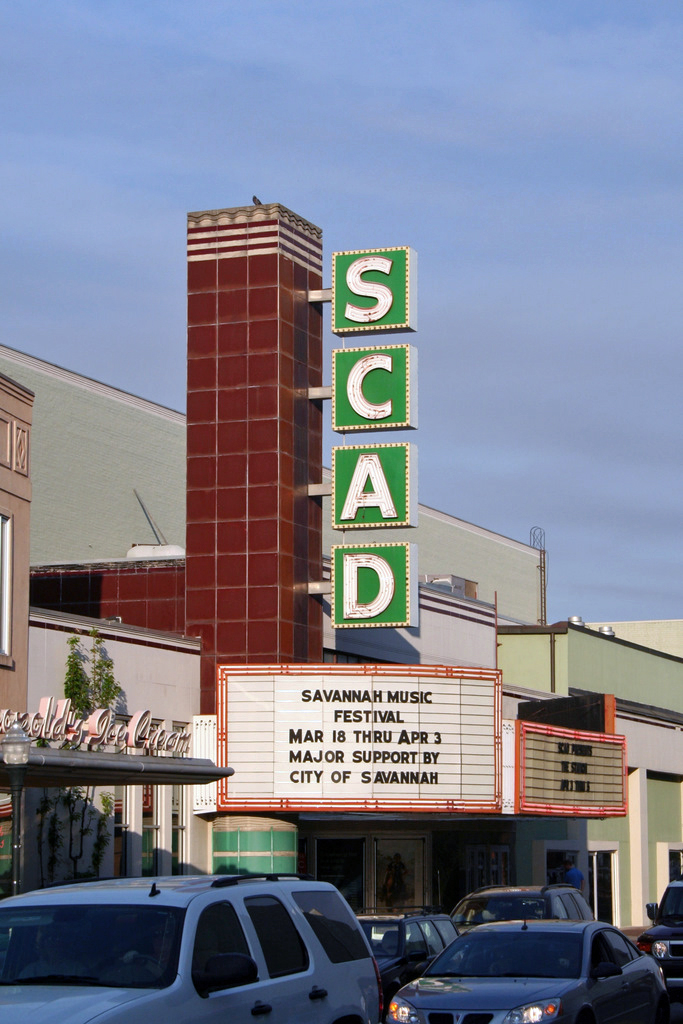
Trustee's Theater in Downtown Savannah

The college holds numerous lectures, performances and film screenings at two historic theaters it owns, the Trustees Theater and the Lucas Theatre for the Arts. These theaters also are used annually for the Savannah Film Festival in late October/early November. Past guests of the festival include Roger Ebert, Peter O'Toole, Tommy Lee Jones, Norman Jewison, Ellen Burstyn, Sir Ian McKellen, Oliver Stone, Liam Neeson, James Franco, Sidney Lumet, Miloš Forman, Michael Douglas, Woody Harrelson, John Goodman, Claire Danes, James Gandolfini, Patrick Stewart, Holly Hunter and many others. With average attendance more than 40,000, the event includes a week of lectures, workshops and screenings of student and professional films. There also is a juried competition.

=== deFINE ART ===
Founded in 2010, deFINE ART brings leading contemporary artists to Savannah and Atlanta annually in February to present new projects, commissioned works, and new performances. Since 2010, guests have included artists such as Lawrence Weiner, Marilyn Minter, Hank Willis Thomas, Carlos Cruz-Diez, and others.

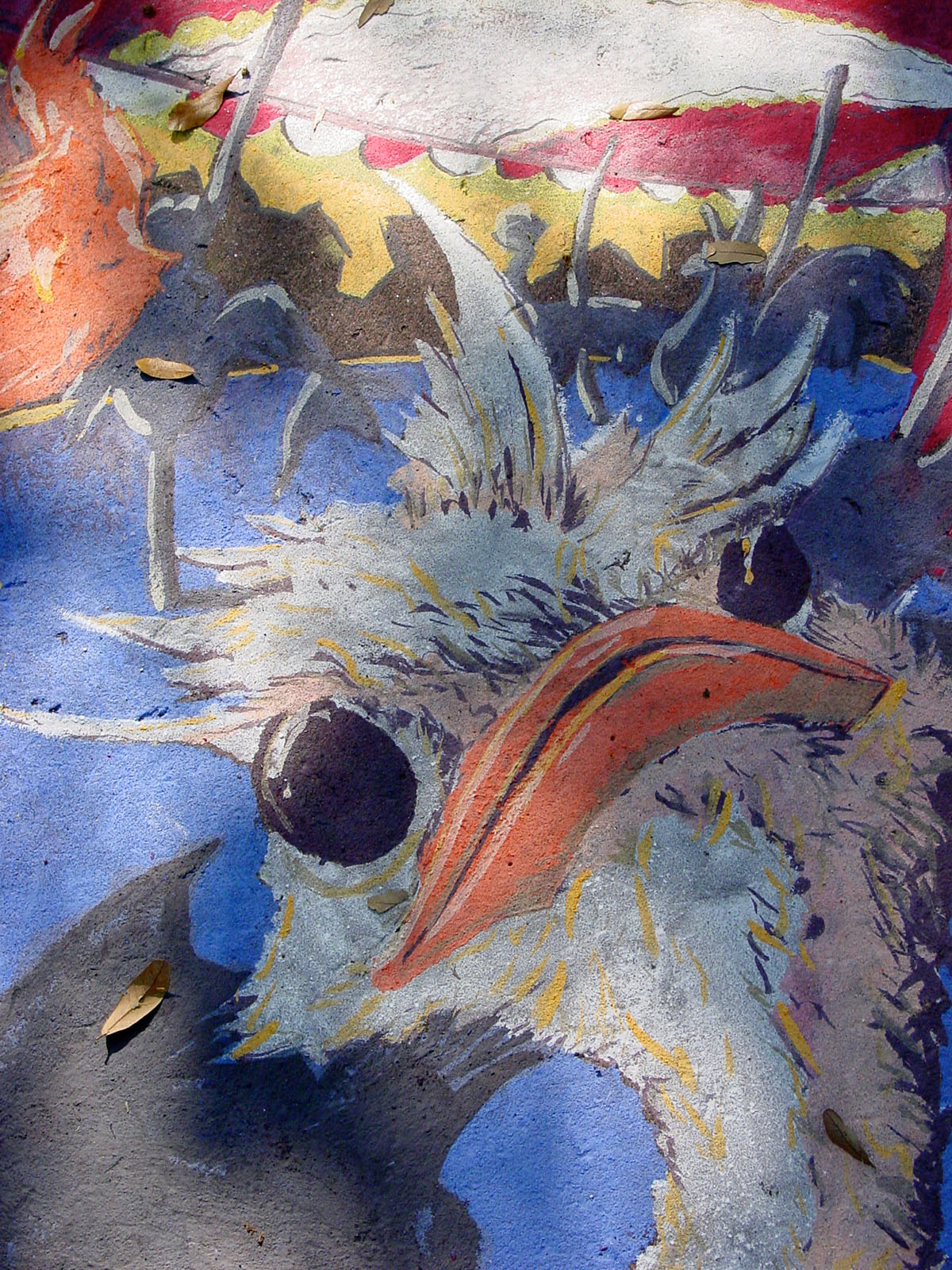
Chalk drawing by SCAD alumni at the Sidewalk Arts Festival

=== Sidewalk Arts and Sand Arts Festivals ===
Each April, SCAD hosts the Sidewalk Arts Festival in downtown Forsyth Park. The festival consists primarily of the chalk-drawing competition, which is divided into group and individual categories of students, alumni and prospective students. Similar is the Sand Arts Festival. This sand festival is held every spring on the beaches of nearby Tybee Island. Contestants can work alone or in groups of up to four people. The competition is divided into sand relief, sand sculpture, sand castle and wind sculpture divisions.

=== Other events ===
Individual departments host yearly and quarterly shows to promote student work. Annual festivals such as SCAD AnimationFest, SCAD GamingFest, SCAD aTVfest, and events such as SCAD Style and offer opportunities for networking.

Students also frequent en masse non-SCAD-affiliated events if they are held in the historic district, such as the Savannah Jazz Festival and the St. Patrick's Day celebration.

== Controversies ==
=== Clarence Thomas Center for Historic Preservation ===
SCAD has received repeated backlash for naming one of its academic halls after Supreme Court Justice Clarence Thomas. Thomas was born and raised in Savannah, and served as an altar boy at a convent located at 439 East Broad Street. In 2010, the building was acquired by the school and renamed the Clarence Thomas Center for Historic Preservation, with Thomas attending the dedication. Following the renewed interest of the Anita Hill hearings during Brett Kavanaugh’s Supreme Court nomination, several petitions were formed by SCAD students and alumni demanding the school change the building’s name. Despite one petition receiving over 2,000 signatures, SCAD refused to rename the building. Students also launched a petition to keep Thomas’ name on the building, which received over 18,000 signatures. In 2022, in response to the Supreme Court’s decision to overturn Roe v. Wade with the decision of Dobbs v. Jackson Women's Health Organization, SCAD once again received backlash for the building’s name. Thomas voted with the majority holding that the U.S. Constitution did not confer a right to abortion, returning to individual states the power to regulate any aspect of abortion not protected by federal law, a decision which sparked protests across the country and in Savannah. Another petition was started by a SCAD student which amassed over 2,000 signatures. Following this renewed backlash, SCAD removed the sign with Thomas’ name from the building, but issued no statement on the matter.

=== Impact on Savannah ===
SCAD has had a significant impact on tourism in Savannah. In a report published by SCAD in 2018, the school claimed to have generated over $3 billion for the city and attracted 14.5 million visitors. A similar report by SCAD in 2020 claimed that the school’s Atlanta and Savannah campuses brought in $766.2 million in annual economic impact for the state. Yet many Savannah residents and SCAD students have expressed dissatisfaction with SCAD’s growth, specifically in Savannah. SCAD does not pay property taxes in Savannah, and the continued growth of the school’s facilities has raised property taxes in many of Savannah’s lower-income neighborhoods. In 2023, the first large-scale protest against SCAD’s expansion was held by community members at the SCAD Museum of Art in response to SCAD’s continued displacement of black families in Savannah. The school has issued no comment on the matter.

In 2022, it was reported that SCAD has claimed "nearly $800 million of property out of local tax revenue" while luring luxury developers to further displace local residents.

=== Racial discrimination claims ===
Between 2020 and 2022, three fired employees at SCAD claimed racial discrimination in being treated “differently” than white members, in having a "hostile work environment", and retaliation for speaking out. SCAD refuted the claims, responding that "SCAD human resources practices are fair, just, and professional". A lawsuit by one claimant, fired fishing coach Isaac Payne, was dismissed at trial and on appeal. The second claimant, fired English-as-a-Second-Language instructor Shantell Colebrooke, filed a discrimination charge with the Equal Employment Opportunity Commission (EEOC) with no decision being reported by her. The third claimant, Director of Giving Darnell Holcomb, was fired because SCAD alleged he did not meet fundraising performance goals. His EEOC claim resulted in a decision in favor of SCAD. Reportedly, the risk of paying significant arbitration costs discouraged him from continuing his discrimination case against SCAD.

=== Censure of SCAD ===
SCAD was censured by the American Association of University Professors for issues surrounding academic freedom, tenure, and the dismissal of faculty members. The first censure came in 1993. After working with the AAUP to be removed from the list in 2010, the organization and school came to an impasse and again, in 2012, the AAUP renewed its censure, where it remains as of 2025.

Potential Clery Act violations

From November 2023 to at least January 2025, SCAD was under assessment by the U.S. Department of Education’s Clery Group. The Clery Group is responsible for enforcing the Clery Act, which requires colleges and universities that participate in federal financial aid programs to keep and disclose information about crime on or near their campuses. The law also requires those colleges and universities to provide certain resources to victims of violence. At least five former SCAD students and employees were interviewed by the Clery Group from November 2023 to January 2025 about SCAD’s handling of sexual misconduct and assault allegations. It’s not clear as of November 2026 what the status of the assessment is.
