= Kimball House (Atlanta) =

Building in Georgia, United States

Coordinates: 33.75380°N 84.38963°W

The Kimball House was the name of two historical hotels in Atlanta, Georgia. United States. Both were constructed on an entire city block at the south-southeast corner of Five Points, bounded by Whitehall Street (now part of Peachtree Street), Decatur Street, Pryor Street, and Wall Street, a block now occupied by a multi-story parking garage.

== First Kimball House ==
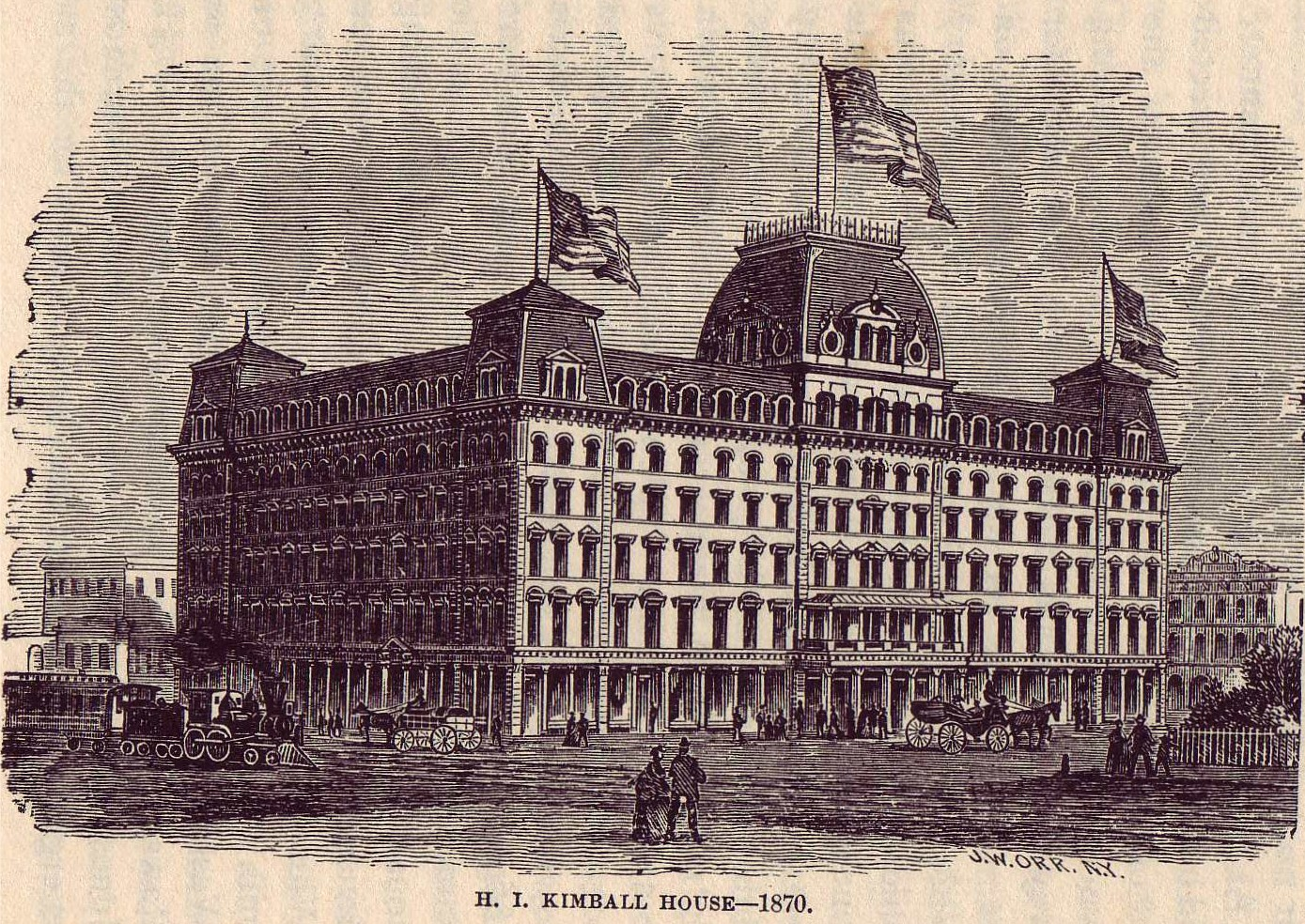
The first Kimball House was built of brick and painted yellow with brown trim.

=== Design and construction ===
In 1870 on a recommendation of building contractor John C. Peck, Hannibal Kimball purchased a lot near the Union Depot where the Atlanta Hotel had been before being burned in 1864 during the Civil War. He gathered the financing for the endeavor through a confusing (and later a scandalous) combination of bonds, mortgages and subscriptions. The original estimate for the hotel was $250,000, though it eventually cost $650,000, 1/15th the total assessed value of Atlanta real estate at the time. The unusual funding scheme resulted in Kimball filing for bankruptcy and losing control of the building by the next year.

Kimball hired William H. Parkins as the architect while Peck served as the construction manager for the project.^{,} Construction began immediately on March 28, 1870, the day after Kimball received his lease from King. The lot, primarily owned by Joseph Thompson, was located on Pryor Street between Decatur and Wall. Thompson sold his portion of the land to Kimball through his real estate agent George W. Adair. The rest of the land was leased to Kimball by Richard Peters and John P. King.

=== Opening ===
Kimball began construction, promising to have the hotel complete by October 1870. True to his word, Kimball hosted a dinner to celebrate the opening of the hotel on October 17 that year, although the structure was only two-thirds complete, and parts of the interior work would take the better part of a decade to be finished.

The completed six-story building was built of brick and painted yellow with brown trim. It had a four-story open-air lobby filed with plants, flowers, and a 12-foot-diameter (3.7 m) fountain. The house also boasted gas-light chandeliers, a central heating plant, a laundry, billiard hall, and 500 hotel rooms. It also had sixteen stores. It was the first building in Atlanta to have elevators and central heating.

=== Role in post-Civil War Atlanta ===
In many ways, the building was the public face of Reconstruction era Atlanta, housing presidents and railroad executives while hosting political meetings and business meetings. Many important citizens lived their adult bachelorhoods in its rooms. Robert Toombs made the Kimball house his second home in Atlanta. The hotel showcased famous entertainers of the day including General Tom Thumb and Edwin Booth, brother of John Wilkes Booth.

In 1892, the Kimball House was the center of excitement surrounding the first University of Georgia vs. Auburn football game held on February 20, 1892. Both teams arrived in Atlanta via the railroad, the Georgia team riding on the Georgia Special, and they immediately headed to the Kimball House where tickets were being sold at 50 cents for adults and 25 cents for children.

=== 1883 fire and destruction of the Kimball House ===
At 4:30 am on August 12, 1883, a careless cigar-smoking lemon dealer began a fire in the southwest corner of the huge building. The fire spread through the elevator shafts and quickly got out of control. The Atlanta Fire Department was unable to do much because of difficulty in reaching the site and poor water pressure from the city cisterns. By 8:00 a.m., the building was destroyed; there were no deaths.

== Second Kimball House ==
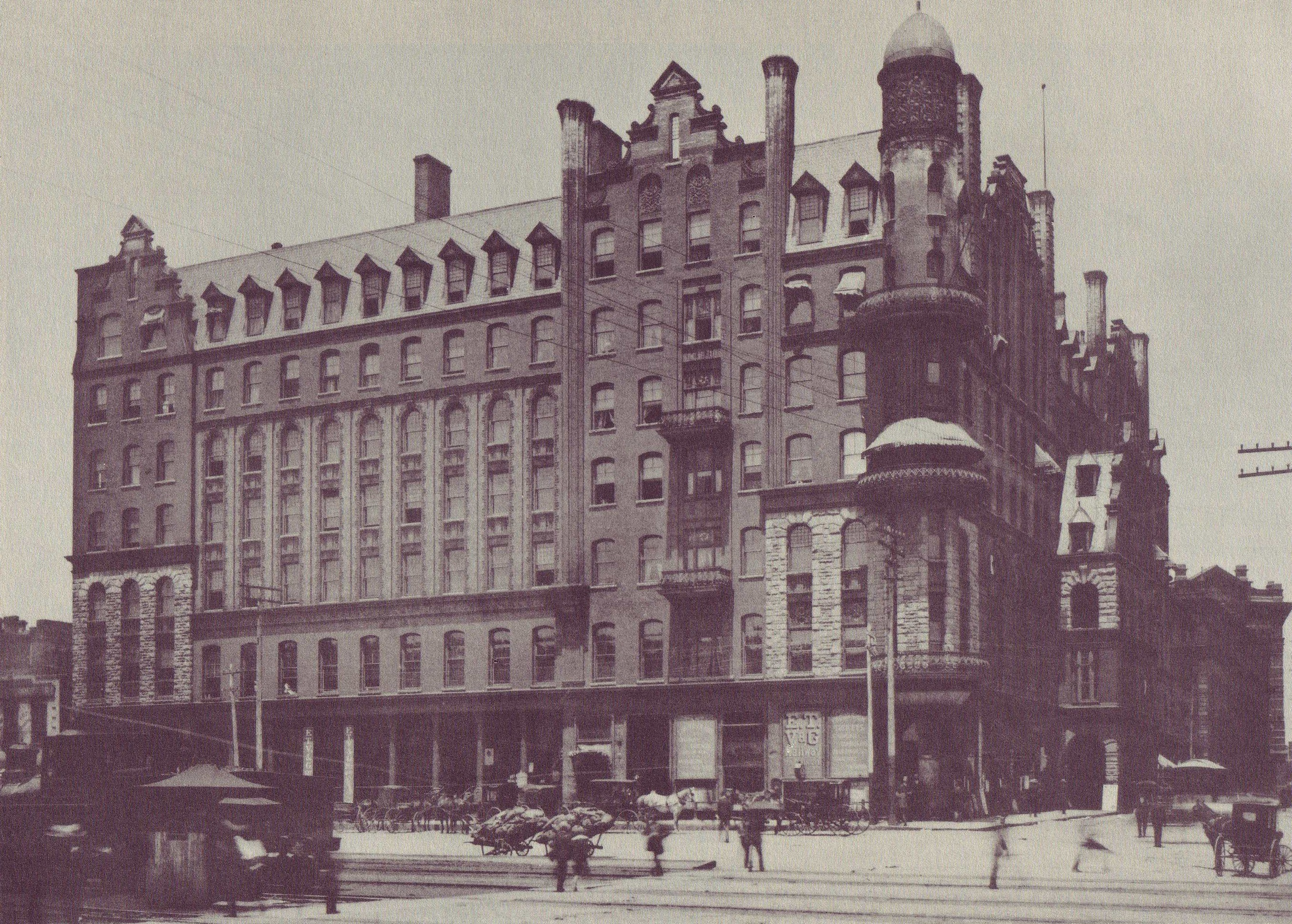
Second Kimball House

=== Design and construction ===
Citing a loss of business and prestige to the city, George Adair, Henry W. Grady, Richard Peters and others began fundraising for rebuilding the hotel. They soon called on Kimball to lead the effort, even though he then resided in Chicago and had had no dealings with the property since leaving town ten years before.

Built on the same site, but much larger than its predecessor, it had seven floors with 31 stores, 22 public rooms, and 357 hotel rooms.

The structure was built to be completely fireproof, and officially opened for business on New Year's Day 1885.

=== Hugh T. Inman ===
When owner Hugh T. Inman's daughter Annie married banker John W. Grant in 1893, Inman gave the Kimball House as a wedding gift to the couple.

=== Later years ===
Bill Monroe's first solo recording session, to be released as The Blue Grass Boys, was recorded in a temporary recording studio in the Kimball House on October 7, 1940.

=== Destruction ===
It was razed in 1959, the first of many historic buildings demolished in Atlanta during the 1960s and '70s, and replaced by a parking deck which still stands.

== See also ==
- Hotels in Atlanta
