= Joseph Thompson (doctor) =

American settler (1797–1885)

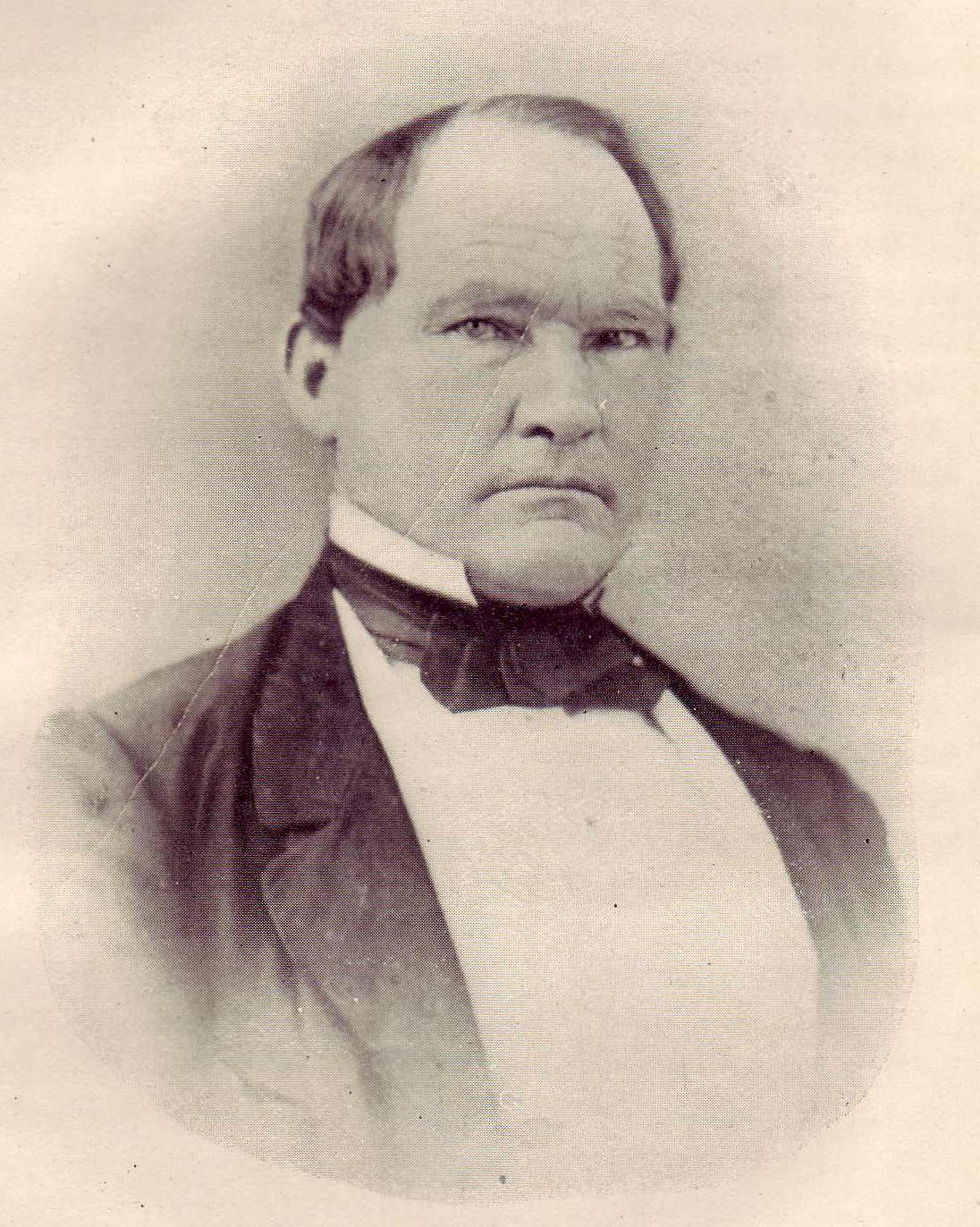
- Born: September 29, 1797; Spartanburg County, South Carolina
- Died: August 21, 1885 (aged 87); Pryor Street, Atlanta, Georgia
- Occupations: Settler, doctor, hotelier, real-estate investor
- Organization: Medical College in Atlanta
- Spouses: Mary Ann Tomlinson Young (m. 1827; died 1849) Second wife (m. 1851; died 1854) Third wife (m. 1858; died 1878)
- Relatives: Richard Peters (son-in-law)

Dr. Joseph Thompson (September 29, 1797 in Spartanburg County, South Carolina – August 21, 1885) was an early settler of Atlanta, Georgia, medical doctor, hotelier, and real-estate investor.

== Biography ==
=== Beginnings ===
Born to a Pennsylvania-bred family in Spartanburg County, South Carolina, he practiced medicine as a youth. He moved to the new town of Decatur, where he married Mary Ann Tomlinson Young in 1827. He ran a stagecoach between the state capital, Milledgeville, and Tuscumbia, Alabama, by way of Decatur, where he kept an inn. He was an important man in town, friend of Judge William Ezzard and John Glen (both future mayors of Atlanta), and was entrusted by the citizenry to make sure that the terminus of the Western & Atlantic Railroad not be their little town. As Terminus (and later Marthasville and still later Atlanta) grew, the Georgia Railroad built a brick hotel building for railroad workers and asked Thompson to run it.

=== Atlanta ===
He and his family arrived in recently founded Atlanta in 1845. He ran the Atlanta Hotel until its destruction after the Battle of Atlanta. The Atlanta Hotel was the largest and best hotel in town at the time and he was known as a genial host. His witticisms there were often quoted in the "Editor's Drawer" feature of Harper's Magazine. He had many residents there including Atlanta's first mayor Moses Formwalt (whose estate Thompson later administered) and Alexander H. Stephens (who was stabbed at the hotel in 1848 by Judge Francis H. Cone).

The Thompsons' eldest child, Mary Jane, married Richard Peters in 1848. Mrs. Thompson died at their Atlanta home in 1849 and he remarried in 1851. His second wife died three years later. He married a third time in 1858 and remained with that woman until her death in 1878.

He owned many important parcels of land in the young city including the future location of the SunTrust Bank building at Five Points. In 1850 he was on the committee that brought the town its first agricultural fair, the Fifth Annual Fair of the Southern Central Agricultural Association, which was held at newly purchased land at the end of Fair Street (now known as Memorial Drive).

After the Civil War, he sold $70,000 worth of real estate including the site of his hotel where the Kimball House was later built. In 1867, when General Pope of the Third Military District ordered election committees to oversee changes in voter status, Pope named Thompson to head the committee for Atlanta.

At the time of his death in 1885 aged 87, he was president of the Medical College in Atlanta and still resided on Pryor Street.
