= Nellie Peters Black =

American women's rights activist (1851–1919)

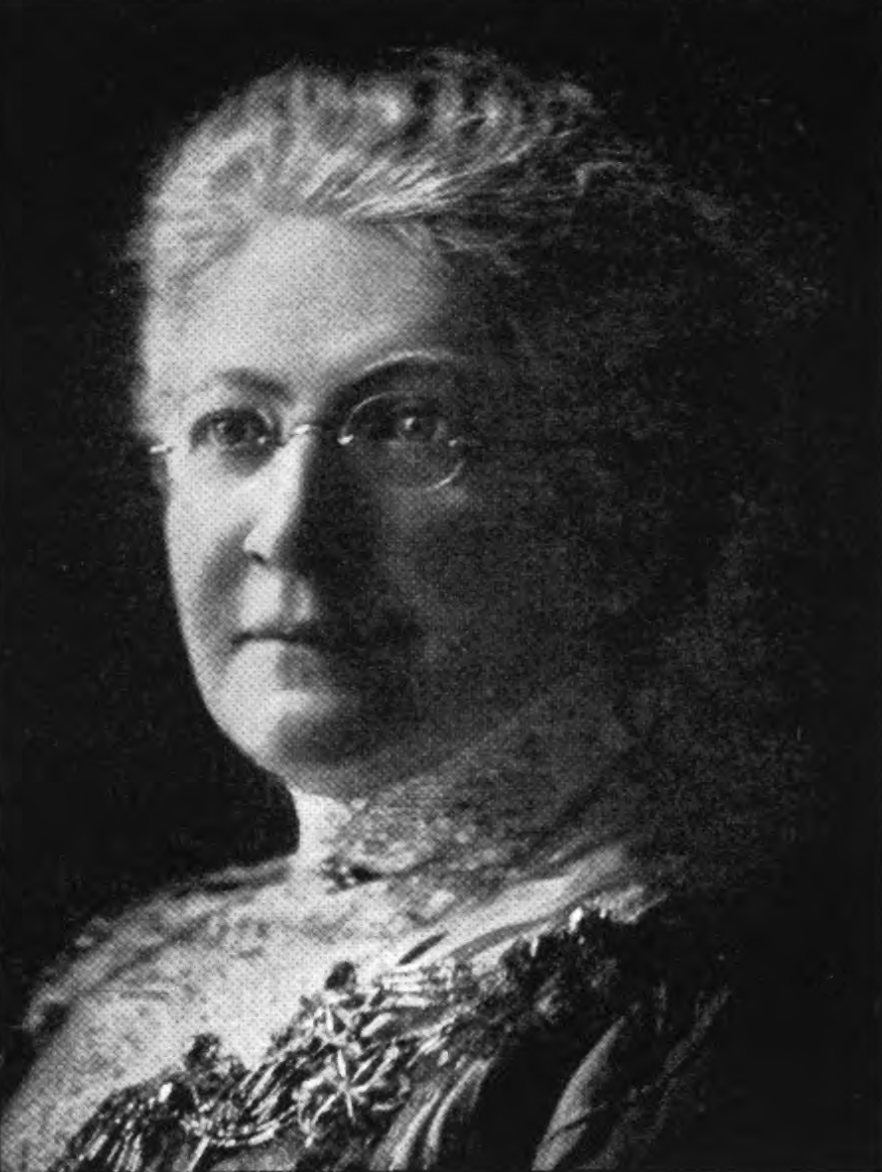
- Born: February 9, 1851
- Died: August 4, 1919 (aged 68)

Mary Ellen Peters Black (1851–1919) was a prominent organizer and activist related to women's issues in Georgia. Black also promoted agricultural reform and increasing educational opportunities, especially for women. She was an active member of the Atlanta Woman's Club as well as the Woman's Auxiliary of the Episcopal Diocese of Georgia.

In 1918, Mary Turner, a pregnant Black woman from Valdosta, Georgia, protested the lynching of her husband. Her punishment was brutal torture before being burned alive, her fetus cut from her abdomen. Nellie Peters Black sent a letter condoning the lynching of Mary Turner. In a letter to the Negro Women's Clubs, Black told the group that "until you teach your people not to molest the whites, there could be no adjustment."

== Childhood ==
Black's father, Richard Peters, moved from Pennsylvania to Georgia to survey the railroads, working as a civil engineer. He settled in Atlanta and married there. Her mother, Mary Jane Thompson, was involved in social clubs and outreach in Atlanta, where Nellie grew up. During the Civil War, Nellie helped her mother provide aid to wounded soldiers at various local hospitals.

== Activism ==
After graduating from Brooke Hall in Pennsylvania, Nellie Peters returned to Atlanta. She soon convinced city officials to build drinking fountains for horses exhausted from the summer heat; it was one of her first examples of civic activism.

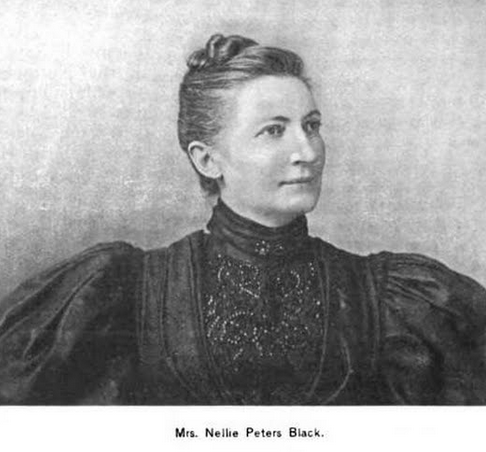
Nellie Peters Black, from an 1895 publication.

In 1877, Nellie married George Robinson Black who served as a state senator and later in Congress. Soon after he died of a stroke, Nellie Black became more active in civic reform in Atlanta. Stemming from her interest in public health, Black helped create the King's Daughters Hospital, the first free hospital in Atlanta.

Black also served as the Vice President of the Atlanta Anti-Tuberculosis and Visiting Nurse Association, which provided free treatment to both black and white people in the highly segregated society established after the Reconstruction era.

She worked to increase educational opportunities, especially for women. Black was an active member of the Atlanta Woman's Club as well as the Woman's Auxiliary of the Episcopal Diocese of Georgia.
