= Atlanta annexations and wards =

Timeline of the municipal boundary changes of Atlanta, Georgia, United States

From its incorporation in 1847, the municipal boundaries of Atlanta, Georgia, United States, were extended repeatedly from a small area around its railroad station to today's city covering 131.7 square miles (341 km^{2}).

Prior to 1954, Atlanta was divided into political divisions called wards. The number of wards were increased as the city grew.

== List of annexations ==
Sortable list of acres annexed per year
Year	Area annexed	Areas annexed
1952	51,922 acres (21,012 ha)	Buckhead, Adams Park, Southwest Atlanta, Lakewood, Northwest Atlanta to the Chattahoochee River/Cobb County Line, ( Including Bolton, Hills Park, Howell Mill, Moores Mill, Riverside, Underwood/Woodland Hills.)
1910	5,606 acres (2,269 ha)	Ansley Park, Sherwood Forest, north Midtown, Hemphill Avenue, east Bankhead, north English Avenue, Washington Park, Mozley Park, Ashview Heights, west West End, Westview
1953	4,769 acres (1,930 ha)	Ben Hill, Greenbriar, et al.
1909	2,612 acres (1,057 ha)	Copenhill, part of Druid Hills, Edgewood, Reynoldstown, East Atlanta
1922	2,481 acres (1,004 ha)	Kirkwood, parts of Virginia-Highland and Morningside, Ormewood Park
1866	2,476 acres (1,002 ha)	expand city limits to a one-and-a-half mile radius
1958	1,832 acres (741 ha)	Areas west of Niskey Lake Road in Southwest Atlanta
1967	1,765 acres (714 ha)	
1889	1,547 acres (626 ha)	expand city limits to one and three-quarter mile radius
1928	1,429 acres (578 ha)	East Lake, Chosewood Park
1925	1,164 acres (471 ha)	
1950	905 acres (366 ha)	
1904	822 acres (333 ha)	
2006	766 acres (310 ha)	Midwest Cascade, Horseshoe Community
2018	744 acres (301 ha)	Centers for Disease Control, Emory University, Children's Healthcare of Atlanta - Egleston Hospital
1894	665 acres (269 ha)	West End
1923	411 acres (166 ha)	
1926	408 acres (165 ha)	
1945	355 acres (144 ha)	
1863	286 acres (116 ha)	
1968	270 acres (110 ha)	
2007	266 acres (108 ha)	Decatur
2015	200 acres (81 ha)	Olmestead at East Lake
1913	197 acres (80 ha)	
1957	161 acres (65 ha)	
1963	158 acres (64 ha)	
1940	150 acres (61 ha)	
1895	143 acres (58 ha)	
2016	129.14 acres (52.26 ha)	Northwest Cascade
1960	110 acres (45 ha)	
1932	110 acres (45 ha)	
2013	108.43 acres (43.88 ha)	Cascade Road Landfill
1916	103 acres (42 ha)	
1969	75 acres (30 ha)	
1915	75 acres (30 ha)	
1854	69 acres (28 ha)	
1976	68 acres (28 ha)	
1973	49 acres (20 ha)	
2003	47 acres (19 ha)	
1962	40 acres (16 ha)	
2008	39 acres (16 ha)	
1970	33 acres (13 ha)	
1930	31 acres (13 ha)	
1949	30 acres (12 ha)	
2009	24 acres (9.7 ha)	
1934	24 acres (9.7 ha)	
1979	21 acres (8.5 ha)	
1954	17 acres (6.9 ha)	
1978	17 acres (6.9 ha)	
2016	16 acres (6.5 ha)	University Drive and Spring Valley Lane
1943	13 acres (5.3 ha)	
1914	9 acres (3.6 ha)	
1965	2 acres (0.81 ha)	
2005	1 acre (0.40 ha)	
2010	0.14 acres (0.057 ha)	

== Annexations by year ==
=== 1847 ===
City is incorporated — city limits are a 1-mile (1.6 km) radius from the zero mile marker of the Western & Atlantic Railroad. City covers 3.14 mi^{2} (8.1 km^{2}), 2,010.6 acres (813.7 ha).

=== 1854 ===
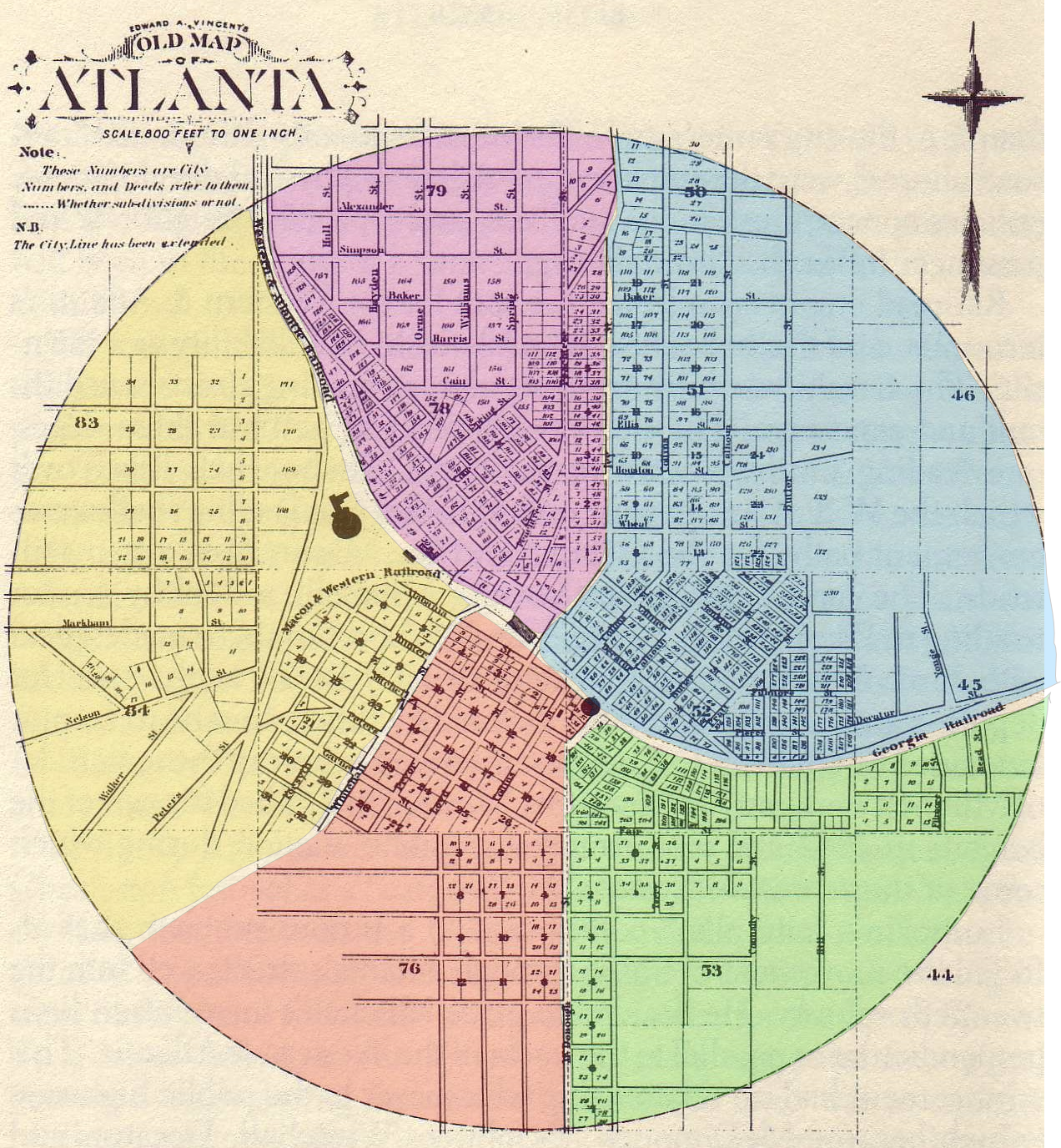
Layout of Atlanta's five wards (1854–1871)

The 1848 charter only specified election of six citywide councilmembers, but on January 9, 1854, an ordinance was adopted that divided the town into five wards and two councilmen from each ward would be elected to coincide with the completion of the first official city hall. The next election with the new rules on January 15, 1855, decided those first Ward bosses who would serve with the short-term mayor, Allison Nelson. The boundaries were as follows:

- First (yellow): all land west of the W&A Railroad and Whitehall Street. This diverse ward had concentrations of industry and working-class people (such as railroad men) in the northern and western parts but the eastern section was home to some of Atlanta's wealthiest citizens, such as Richard Peters.

- Second (red): land south of Georgia RR between Whitehall and McDonough. This wealthy section included the bulk of the town's wholesalers, warehouses, grocers and hotels. The residential areas included people like Dr. Joseph Thompson.

- Third (green): land south of Georgia RR and east of McDonough. This ward included the new city hall, a number of mills along the railroad and the east many large estates including that of Lemuel P. Grant.

- Fourth (blue): north of Georgia RR and east of Ivy. This ward had two of the roughest sections of town; the red-light district along Decatur Street (including Murrell's Row) and Slabtown but the northern part was home to mostly small farms.

- Fifth (violet): west of Ivy and north of W&A Railroad. This ward contained the large homes along Peachtree Street and the southern part, Fairlie-Poplar was also largely residential with warehousing along the western part.

=== 1866 ===
On March 12, city limits expand to a one-and-a-half mile radius from Union Depot.

=== 1871 ===
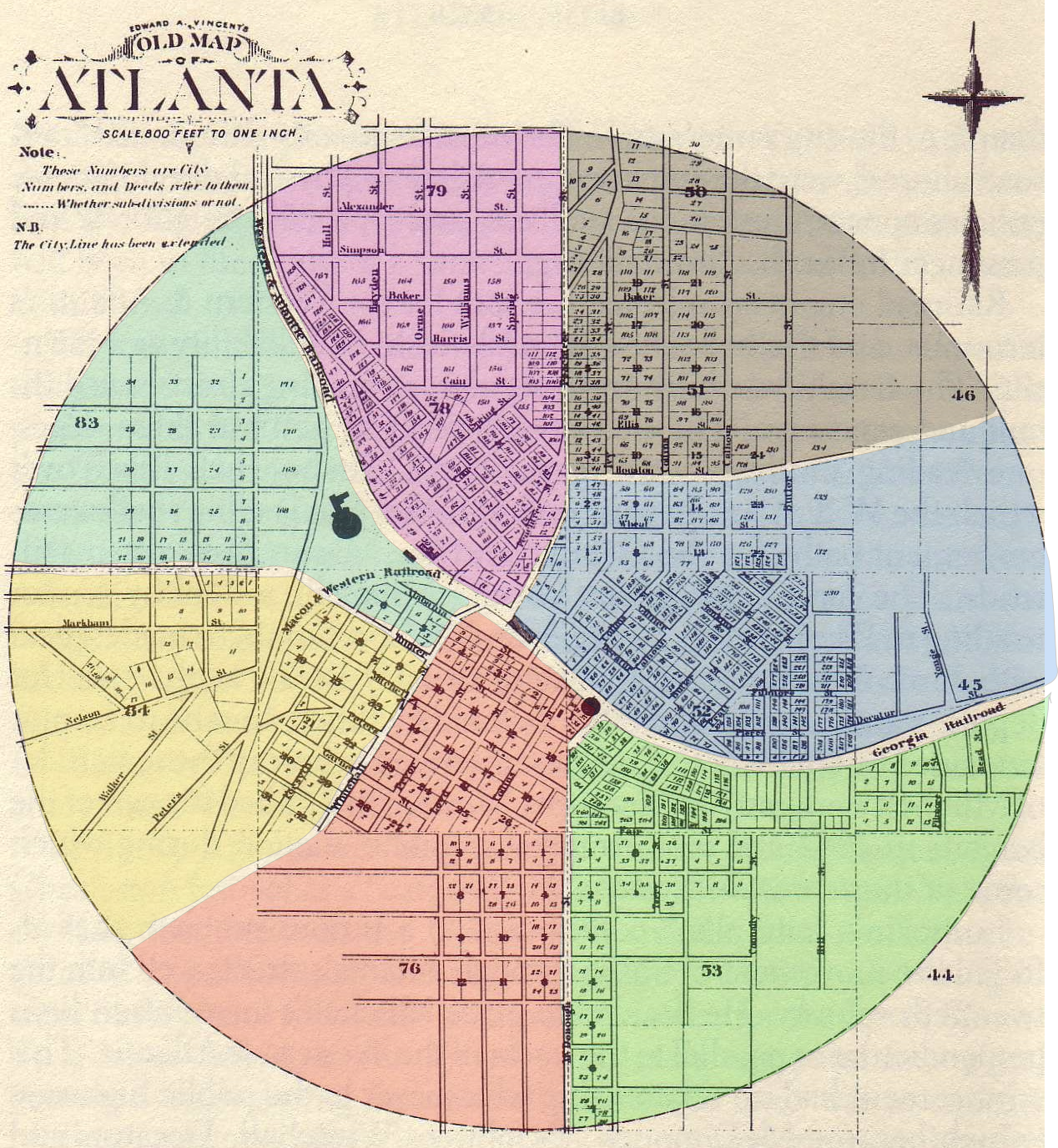
Layout of Atlanta's seven wards (1871–1874)

During a huge boom of post-war building, two new wards were added from parts of the First, Fourth and Fifth to reflect the changing look of the city.

- Sixth Ward (aqua): established October 1871 as the half of the First Ward north of Hunter St (MLK). This division left the wealthy in the First ward and gave the working-class people to the north two councilmen of their own.
- Seventh Ward (grey): established December 2, 1871, of parts of the Fourth and Fifth. Specifically from the "junction of Houston and Pryor streets, thence through lot nineteen, between blocks three, one and two, five and six, to the city limits; thence northerly along the city limits to Peachtree Street; thence south along Peachtree Street and Pryor Street to the beginning." And the Fourth was extended "from Ivy Street west to Pryor, and from Houston Street south to the railroad, and that Pryor Street shall be the line between the fourth and fifth wards, and Pryor and Peachtree streets between the fifth and seventh wards." This gave the red-light district to the Fourth and created a new Ward of mostly farmers and to the west, fine residences along Ivy and the east side of Peachtree.

=== 1874 ===
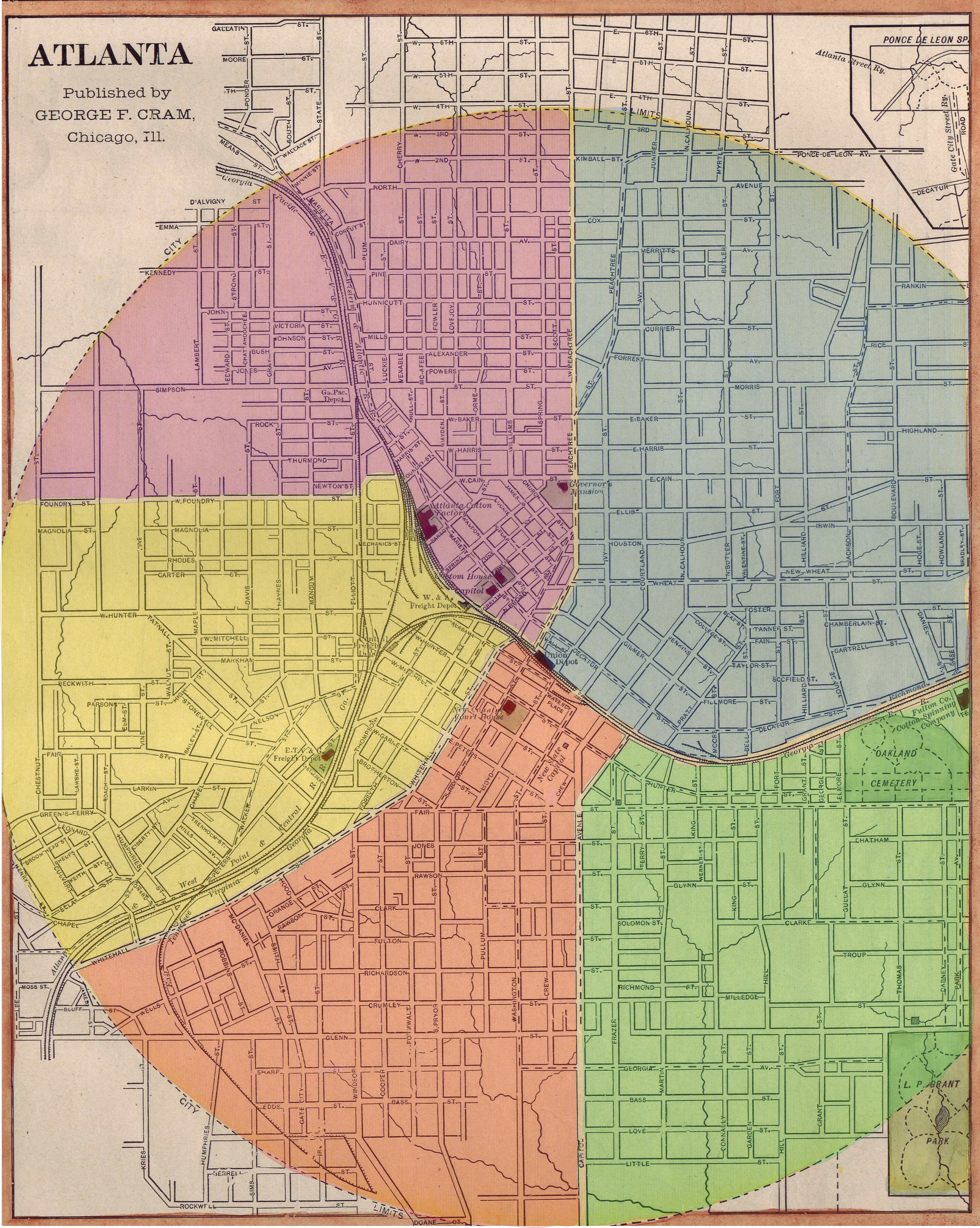
Layout of Atlanta's five wards (1874 to 1883)

A new city charter was approved by Governor Smith on February 28, 1874, which reduced the number of wards back to five and created a bi-cameral council of two councilmen from each ward and a second body of three at-large aldermen was established. Each year one of the aldermen would be up for election and during his last year in office would serve as president of the other body. They acted separately on finances but together for all other business.

The new ward layout was as follows:

- First Ward (yellow) was bounded by Western & Atlantic Railroad, Foundry St, south around the city limits to modern Peachtree Street
- Second Ward (red) was bounded by the Georgia Railroad, Whitehall south to city limits then north-east to McDonough (Capital Ave) and up to the railroad
- Third Ward (green) was bounded by Butler (Jesse Hill Dr) and McDonough Streets south to the city limits north-east to Georgia RR, then west to Butler
- Fourth Ward (blue) from Pryor and tracks east on Georgia RR to city limits then north west to West Peachtree and south to origin.
- Fifth Ward (purple) from Pryor and tracks north-east to Peachtree, then West Peachtree to city limits, south-west to Foundry and W&A RR and east to origin

=== 1883 ===
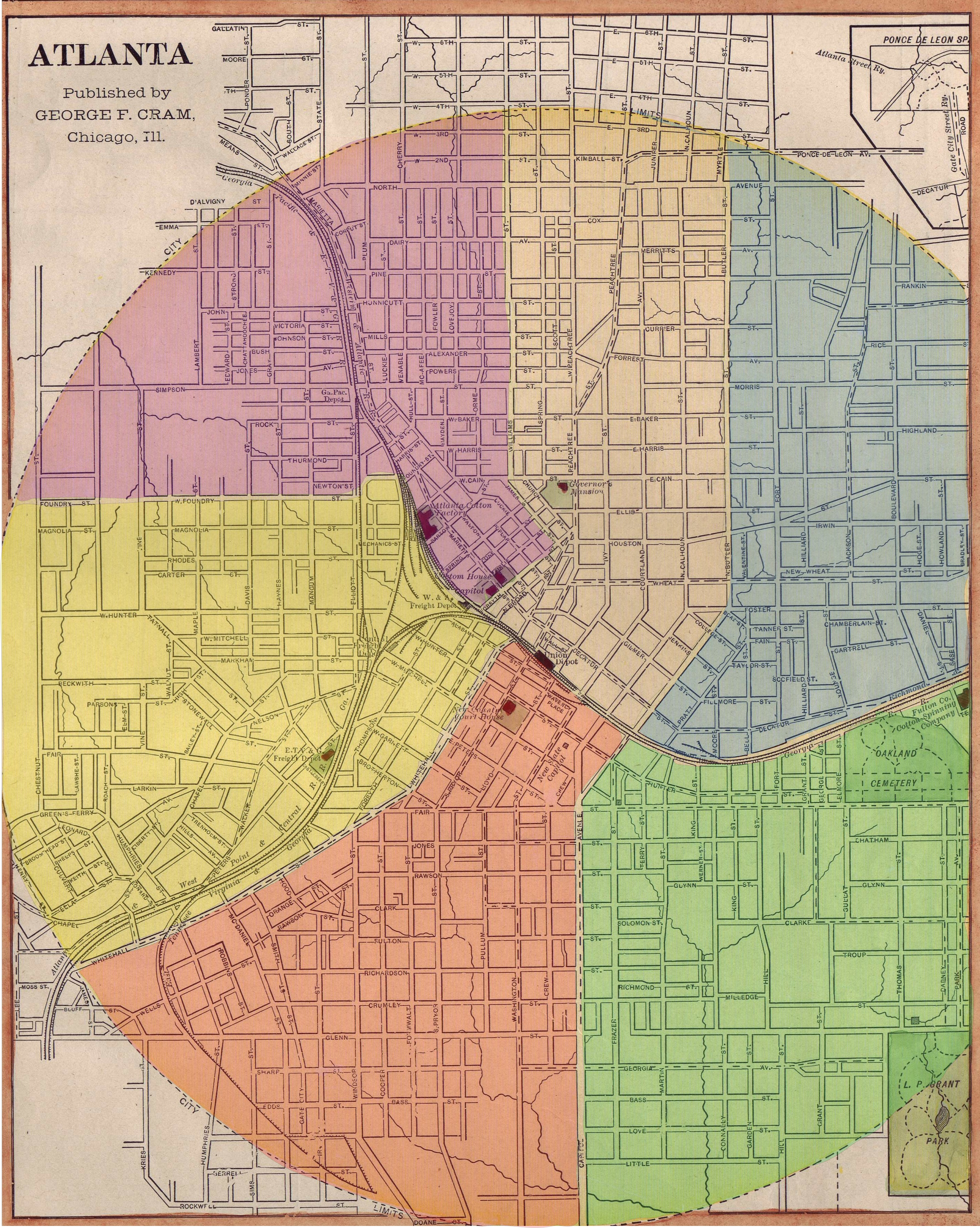
Layout of Atlanta's six wards (1883 to 1894)

On November 5, 1883, a Sixth Ward (beige) was carved out of the Fourth and Fifth Wards. Its boundaries started at Butler and the GRR (today's Grady Hospital) north to North Ave at Myrtle St, then up Myrtle to the city limit at 3rd St. Follow the arc of the city limit to Williams, south to Cain (International) then James (Church) to Forsyth south to the tracks then east on the tracks to origin. This separated the wealthy Peachtree corridor from the other parts of north Atlanta. (Garrett Vol II, p. 53–54)

=== 1889 ===
Expansion of city limits to one and three-quarters radius from union depot.

=== 1894 ===
When West End was annexed into the city in 1894, it became a new Seventh Ward.

=== 1904 ===
822 acres (333 ha) annexed - the southern part of what is now Midtown was already within the 1889 limits, but in 1904 the city annexes most of the rest of what is now Midtown: this is an area bounded by the 1889 circular city limits on the south, and West Peachtree St. on the west, stretching north up to but not including Ansley Park (roughly 6th to 16th Streets), Piedmont Park, the remainder of Historic Midtown east to what is now the Beltline. this includes a strip of what is now the Old Fourth Ward between the 1889 limits and the Beltline.

=== 1905 ===
Further expansion of the city limits was part of a long effort.

In October 1897 Frank P. Rice drove a failed proposal to annex Pittsburgh, Reynoldstown, Bellwood, and what was then called "north Atlanta".

"North Atlanta" was defined at the time roughly as today's Midtown, Georgia Tech, and English Avenue:

- today's Midtown between Myrtle St. in the Midtown Historic District and Cherry St., now inside the Georgia Tech campus, as far north as 14th St (then called Wilson Ave.)
- most of what is now the Georgia Tech campus, south of what was then 5th Street
- the area west of Georgia Tech, south of Jefferson St., as far west as Ashby St. (now Lowery Blvd.), including today's English Avenue neighborhood

In 1902 a special committee made a new proposal to annex those areas as well as "Bonnie Brae", Copenhill, and the "St. Charles Avenue" area (in today's Virginia Highland). By then, "north Atlanta" was being referred to as "Peachtree".

In 1905, the Eighth Ward was added. An act of the Georgia General Assembly was enacted on August 3, 1904, which designated the area from then current city limits (at 6th St and West Peachtree), north to 15th St, then east to Piedmont Ave, then northeast to Southern Railway (basically follow Piedmont to the Ansley Park area), then southwardly along the railway the limits. The act also took part of the Sixth Ward north of North Ave. into the new Eighth Ward.

=== 1909 ===
On January 1, 1909, a Ninth Ward was formed out of just annexed Copenhill, part of Druid Hills, Edgewood, Reynoldstown and East Atlanta. Edgewood alone had had its own city government before the annexation.

=== 1910 ===
==== Annexations ====
Annexation of 3,510 acres (1,420.45 ha; 5.48 sq mi) to the north and west:

- Ansley Park and most of Sherwood Forest
- Peachtree Street from 15h street north to Palisades Road in southern Buckhead
- the area that is now the Georgia Tech campus that was not already part of the city, including the Hemphill Avenue neighborhood
- Bankhead east of the Louisville and Nashville Railroad line
- Remainder of English Avenue (northern part) that was not already part of the city
- Washington Park
- What is now Mozley Park, then called Battle Hill
- Ashview Heights
- remainder of today's West End (western part) that was not already part of the city
- most of Westview

Annexation of 2,011 acres (813.82 ha; 3.14 sq mi) including the town of Oakland City and from the previous city limits south to the Beltline: Adair Park, most of Pittsburgh, southern Summerhill, southern/eastern edges of Grant Park neighborhood.

Annexation of the blocks surrounding Brown Park (now Brownwood Park) in East Atlanta - Moreland east to Stokesland and Glenwood south to the current city limits.

==== New Tenth Ward ====
A new Tenth Ward was created. The eastern boundary was McDaniel Street. The southwestern boundary was Whitehall Street to the Central of Georgia Railroad, and from there along the railroad to a point just south of the Beltline. From there, the boundary ran due west to a prolongation of Holderness Street south of the Beltline, and from there southwest to the junction of Campbellton and Utoy roads. Then due east along the north boundary of Fort McPherson to the Central of Georgia Railroad. Then south along that railway line to a point between Osborne and Astor avenues, then east to Sylvan Road, then north to the Beltline, then east to McDaniel Street.

This included:

- New territory from the annexations including Oakland City
- Territory from the Second Ward west of McDaniel Street
- Territory from the Seventh Ward east of the Central of Georgia Railroad

=== 1919 ===
Eleventh Ward created from part of the Ninth Ward (area south of the Georgia railroad line) and from part of the Third Ward. The new ward corresponds to East Atlanta, Ormewood Park, and other adjacent areas.

=== 1922 ===
- Kirkwood annexed (975 acres (394.6 ha; 1.5 sq mi))
- North part of Virginia-Highland and south part of Morningside/Lenox Park annexed (858 acres (347.2 ha; 1.3 sq mi))
- Ormewood Park annexed (482 acres (195.1 ha; 0.8 sq mi))

=== 1923 ===
In June 1923 there was a failed movement to annex College Park, East Point, and Hapeville.

=== 1928 ===
- East Lake annexed (717 acres (290.2 ha; 1.1 sq mi)) as the 12th ward.
- Chosewood Park annexed. (626 acres (253.3 ha; 1.0 sq mi))

=== 1929 ===
A Thirteenth Ward was created as the section of the Ninth Ward north of St. Charles and east of the Beltline to the west side of Briarcliff and north the corporate limits. (most of today's Virginia-Highland)

=== 1937 ===
On March 14, 1935, the legislature reduced the number of wards from 13 to 6 and the thirty-nine member city council is cut to eighteen members effective January 1, 1937. The wards were combined as such:

- First: old 2nd & 3rd (south from Central RR to Grant Park)
- Second: old 11th & 12th (southeast: Ormewood, East Atlanta and East Lake)
- Third: old 1st, 5th & 6th (northwest from Central RR around to three blocks east of Peachtree)
- Fourth: old 7th & 10th (from West End to Oakland City)
- Fifth: old 4th & 8th (from Georgia RR up to Piedmont Park and Ansley west of the Beltline)
- Sixth: old 9th & 13th (everything east of the Beltline and north of Georgia RR: Inman Park, Druid Hills, etc.)

=== 1952 ===
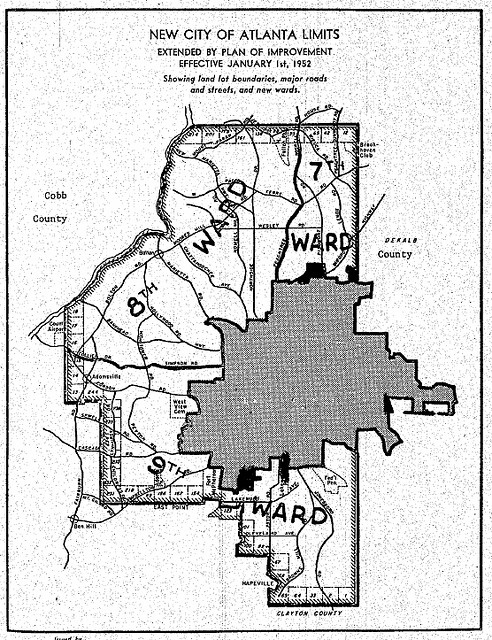
1952 annexation

In 1951, after a failed 1947 referendum and two other failed attempts, the state legislature passed a "Plan of Improvement" by which on Jan. 1, 1952, the city annexed 51,470 acres (20,829.2 ha; 80.4 sq mi) in Buckhead, Adams Park, Southwest Atlanta, and Lakewood, Northwest Atlanta to the Chattahoochee River/Cobb County Border. This was by far the largest expansion in Atlanta's history, tripling the size of the city to 118 square miles (310 km^{2}) and adding 100,000 residents. This helped spread the burden of providing public services by adding to the base a large group of mostly more affluent residents. The annexation was viewed as a triumph of Mayor Hartsfield.

Atlanta would in the 1970s again try, but without success, to repeat the process by state legislation to annex what is now Sandy Springs to Atlanta.

=== 1953 ===
Annexation of Ben Hill, Greenbriar and other adjacent areas in far southwestern Atlanta.

=== 1954 ===
The ward system is ended. No longer a bicameral body, only a board of six aldermen with a Vice-Mayor serving as president of the board. All positions were elected citywide. (For post-ward setup, see Political structure of Atlanta).

=== Annexations since 1953 ===
Since 1953, multiple small annexations (and deannexations) to the City of Atlanta have occurred, in two periods: 1954–1979 and 2003-2010. No annexations took place between 1979 and 2003.

Multiple small areas adjacent to southwestern Atlanta were annexed including Midwest Cascade, Cascade Glen, and the Horseshoe Community. Sandtown's 2007 petition for annexation was put on hold.

These annexations added a few thousand residents, and approximately three square miles, including areas mostly in the southwest of the city, but also small parcels in the east and north of the city.

==== Emory University and Centers for Disease Control annexation ====
In December 2017, the Atlanta City Council approved an annexation request by Emory University, the Centers for Disease Control, Children's Healthcare of Atlanta - Egleston Hospital, and other contiguous property owners in the Druid Hills neighborhood of DeKalb County. The annexation was effective January 1, 2018. In June 2017 the university leadership formally petitioned the City of Atlanta to annex it. To comply with the requirement that an annexed area be adjacent to the existing city limits, the university purchased a residence partially within the then-city limits. The city government also entered into a settlement with the DeKalb County government to settle a dispute, paving the way for the annexation.

Due to the taxable revenue involved, there was a dispute over whether the area would remain in the DeKalb County School District or transition to Atlanta Public Schools. In 2016 Emory University made a statement that "Annexation of Emory into the City of Atlanta will not change school districts, since neighboring communities like Druid Hills will still be self-determining regarding annexation." By 2017 the city agreed to include the annexed property in the boundaries of APS, a move decried by the leadership of DeKalb County Schools as it would take taxable property away from that district. In 2017 the number of children living in the annexed territory who attended public schools was nine. The annexed area ultimately went to APS, and as part of a 2019 settlement Emory would help establish school-based clinics for DeKalb schools. Students in the area were to be rezoned to APS effective 2024; they were zoned to DeKalb schools before then.
