= Ira O. McDaniel =

- Born: Ira Oliver McDaniel; January 19, 1807
- Died: August 28, 1887 (aged 80)
- Resting place: Oakland Cemetery
- Occupations: Farmer; newspaperman
- Spouse: Rebecca Walker
- Children: Henry McDaniel

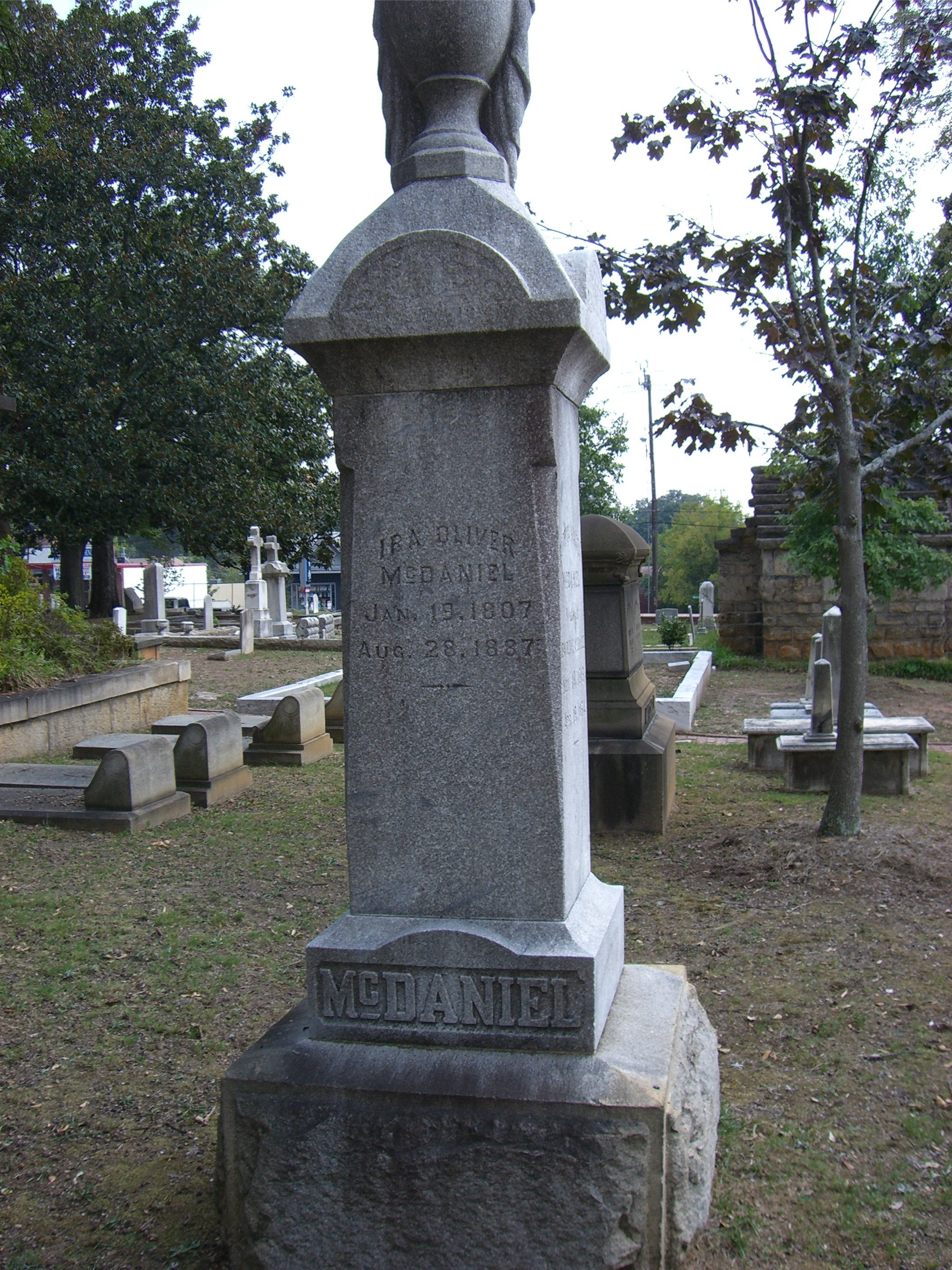
McDaniel grave in Oakland Cemetery

Ira Oliver McDaniel (January 19, 1807 – August 28, 1887) was a cotton merchant, farmer and newspaper man in early Atlanta, Georgia.

== Personal life ==
In the 1830s he lived in Monroe, Georgia with his wife Rebecca Walker (November 10, 1819 – April 19, 1854) where their son, Henry McDaniel, a future Governor of Georgia was born. There he was one of the first professors at the new Mercer Institute.

== Career ==
The family moved to Atlanta in 1847 and two years later he co-founded its first successful daily newspaper, the Daily Intelligencer. In 1849, he did critical research to resolve the ownership claims on the central land lot 77, part of which had been donated to serve as the first rail depot and park in the town. In 1852 he was elected to the city council where he served with mayor Thomas Gibbs. That same year he was one of the incorporators of the Atlanta National Bank which was founded on a stock of $300,000. On January 15, 1855, he ran for mayor as a Know Nothing Party candidate but was defeated by Allison Nelson who ran as a Democrat and days later the Know Nothing faction unsuccessfully contested the election. In 1857, he represented the Fifth Ward in city council with Dr. James Alexander.

== Death ==
He is buried with his wife and parents at Oakland Cemetery. McDaniel Street which connects the Castleberry Hill and the Mechanicsville neighborhoods in Atlanta is named for him.
