= 1883 Georgia gubernatorial special election =

- April 24, 1883
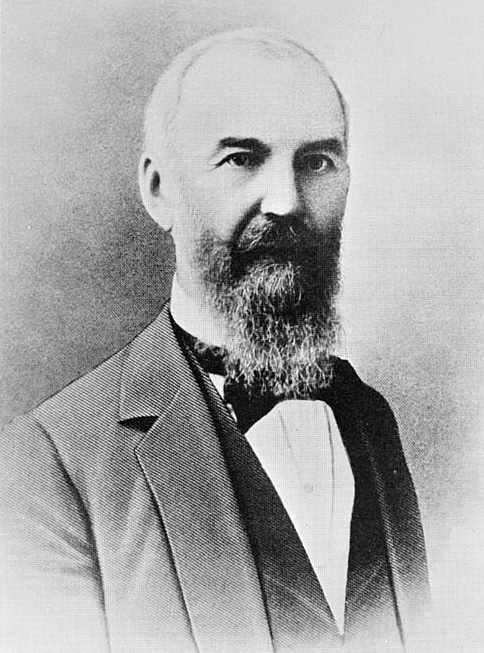
Nominee	Henry Dickerson McDaniel
Party	Democratic
Popular vote	23,680
Percentage	98.61%
Governor before election
James S. Boynton (Acting)
Democratic
Elected Governor
Henry Dickerson McDaniel
Democratic

The 1883 Georgia gubernatorial special election was held on April 24, 1883, in order to elect the Governor of Georgia following the death of Governor Alexander H. Stephens. Democratic nominee and former member of Georgia State Senate Henry Dickerson McDaniel ran unopposed and thus won the election. It was the last special election for a Georgia state row office to be held in an odd year until the 2025 Public Service Commission special election.

== General election ==
On election day, April 24, 1883, Democratic nominee Henry Dickerson McDaniel won the election with 98.61% of the vote, thereby holding Democratic control over the office of Governor. McDaniel was sworn in as the 52nd Governor of Georgia on May 10, 1883.

=== Results ===
Georgia gubernatorial special election, 1883
Party	Candidate	Votes	%
Democratic	Henry Dickerson McDaniel	23,680	98.61
	Others	334	1.39
Total votes		24,014	100.00
Democratic hold			
