= Henry Dickerson McDaniel =

American politician (1836–1926)

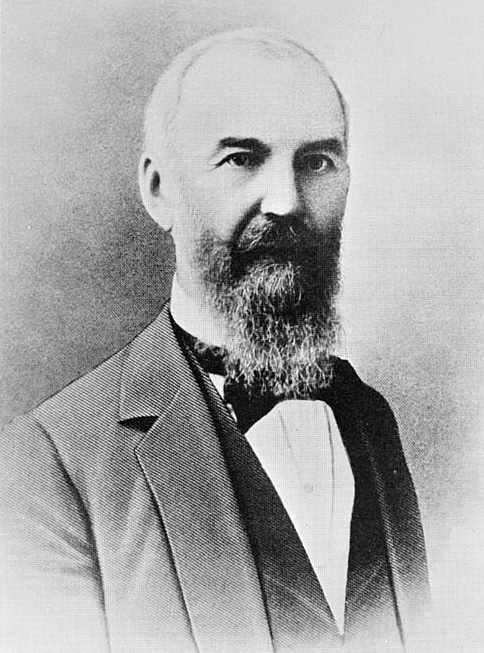
- McDaniel, c. 1885–1887

52nd Governor of Georgia
- In office May 10, 1883 – November 9, 1886
- Preceded by: James S. Boynton
- Succeeded by: John B. Gordon

Member of Georgia State Senate
- In office 1874–1882

Member of Georgia House of Representatives
- In office 1872–1874

Personal details
- Born: September 4, 1836 Monroe, Georgia, U.S.
- Died: July 25, 1926 (aged 89) Monroe, Georgia, U.S.
- Resting place: Monroe Cemetery
- Party: Democratic
- Spouse: Hester C. Felker (m. 1865)
- Children: 2
- Parent: Ira O. McDaniel (father)
- Education: Mercer University (BA); University of Georgia LLD)
- Profession: Attorney

Military service
- Allegiance: Confederate States of America
- Branch/service: Confederate States Army
- Years of service: 1861–1865
- Rank: Major
- Unit: 11th Georgia Infantry
- Battles/wars: American Civil War; Battle of Gettysburg

Henry Dickerson McDaniel (September 4, 1836 – July 25, 1926) was an American politician who fought in the Civil War. A member of the Democratic Party, he served as the 52nd governor of Georgia from 1883 to 1886.

== Early life and education ==
Henry Dickerson McDaniel was born on September 4, 1836, in Monroe, Georgia, to Ira McDaniel. Ira McDaniel was one of the first professors of Mercer University. McDaniel attended high school in Atlanta. He graduated with a Bachelor of Arts from Mercer University in 1856. He established a law practice in Monroe in 1857. He later attended the University of Georgia and received a LL.D in 1906. He was the youngest delegate to Georgia's secession convention in 1861.

== Civil War ==
McDaniel joined the Confederate States Army on July 2, 1861, as a first lieutenant of the 11th Georgia Infantry Regiment. McDaniel was promoted to major in November 1862. McDaniel first attracted attention during the American Civil War for taking command of the 11th Georgia Infantry after the death of his officers at the Battle of Gettysburg. On July 10, 1863, he was shot by a Union soldier at Funkstown, Maryland. Two days later, he was captured by Union troops in Hagerstown, Maryland. He was hospitalized at Point Lookout and then transferred to Johnson's Island in Sandusky, Ohio. He remained in a POW camp until July 1865.

== Political career ==
McDaniel was a member of the Democratic Party. After the war, McDaniel entered Georgia state politics. He served in the House from 1872 to 1874 and in the Senate from 1874 to 1882.

McDaniel was elected Governor of Georgia to complete the term of Alexander Stephens, who died shortly after his inauguration in 1883. He served out Stephens' term and was re-elected as governor in 1884. During his administration, the Georgia School of Technology was established, and construction began on the new State Capitol. He signed the General Local Option Liquor Law into effect on September 18, 1885 as part of the Temperance Movement in Georgia.

== Personal life ==
McDaniel met Hester C. Felker at the Female Academy in 1857. He wrote letters to her throughout the war and while held prisoner. After the war, McDaniel returned to Monroe, where he married Hester C. Felker on December 20, 1865. Felker's father did not approve of the marriage, but Henry and Hester McDaniel were married for sixty years. The couple had two children, Sanders and Gipsy.

His home, the McDaniel-Tichenor House, was listed with the National Register of Historic Places in 1980.

== Death ==
McDaniel died at his home in Monroe on July 25, 1926. He was interred at Monroe Cemetery.

== See also ==
- List of signers of the Georgia Ordinance of Secession

Party political offices
| Preceded by Alexander H. Stephens | Democratic nominee for Governor of Georgia; 1883, 1884 | Succeeded by John Brown Gordon |
Political offices
| Preceded by James S. Boynton | Governor of Georgia; 1883-1886 | Succeeded by John Brown Gordon |
