= 1884 Georgia gubernatorial election =

- October 1, 1884
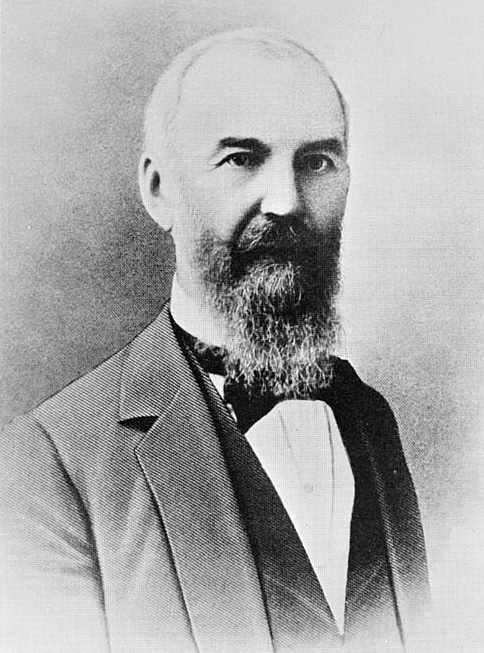
Nominee	Henry Dickerson McDaniel
Party	Democratic
Popular vote	119,880
Percentage	100.00%
- County results McDaniel: >90% No vote
Governor before election
Henry Dickerson McDaniel
Democratic
Elected Governor
Henry Dickerson McDaniel
Democratic

The 1884 Georgia gubernatorial election was held on October 1, 1884, to elect the governor of Georgia. Democratic nominee and incumbent Governor Henry Dickerson McDaniel ran unopposed and thus won re-election.

== General election ==
On election day, October 1, 1884, Democratic nominee Henry Dickerson McDaniel won re-election with 100.00% of the vote, thereby holding Democratic control over the office of governor. McDaniel was sworn in for his first full term on November 9, 1884.

=== Results ===
Georgia gubernatorial election, 1884
Party	Candidate	Votes	%
Democratic	Henry Dickerson McDaniel (incumbent)	119,880	100.00
Total votes		119,880	100.00
Democratic hold			
