= Atlanta's 4th City Council district =

Atlanta's 4th City Council district is one of the twelve geographic districts in the Atlanta City Council. It is currently represented by Jason Dozier, who was elected in 2022 after defeating incumbent Cleta Winslow.

The district was created in 1973 after a new city charter was passed, which replaced the former at-large six-member Board of Aldermen with a 15-member City Council of 12 districts and 6 (later 3) at-large posts. A previous Third Ward existed in various forms from 1854 to 1954.

== History ==
Atlanta's Fourth Ward encompassed mainly what is now called the Old Fourth Ward.

== List of aldermen (1854-1954) ==
=== 1874 ===
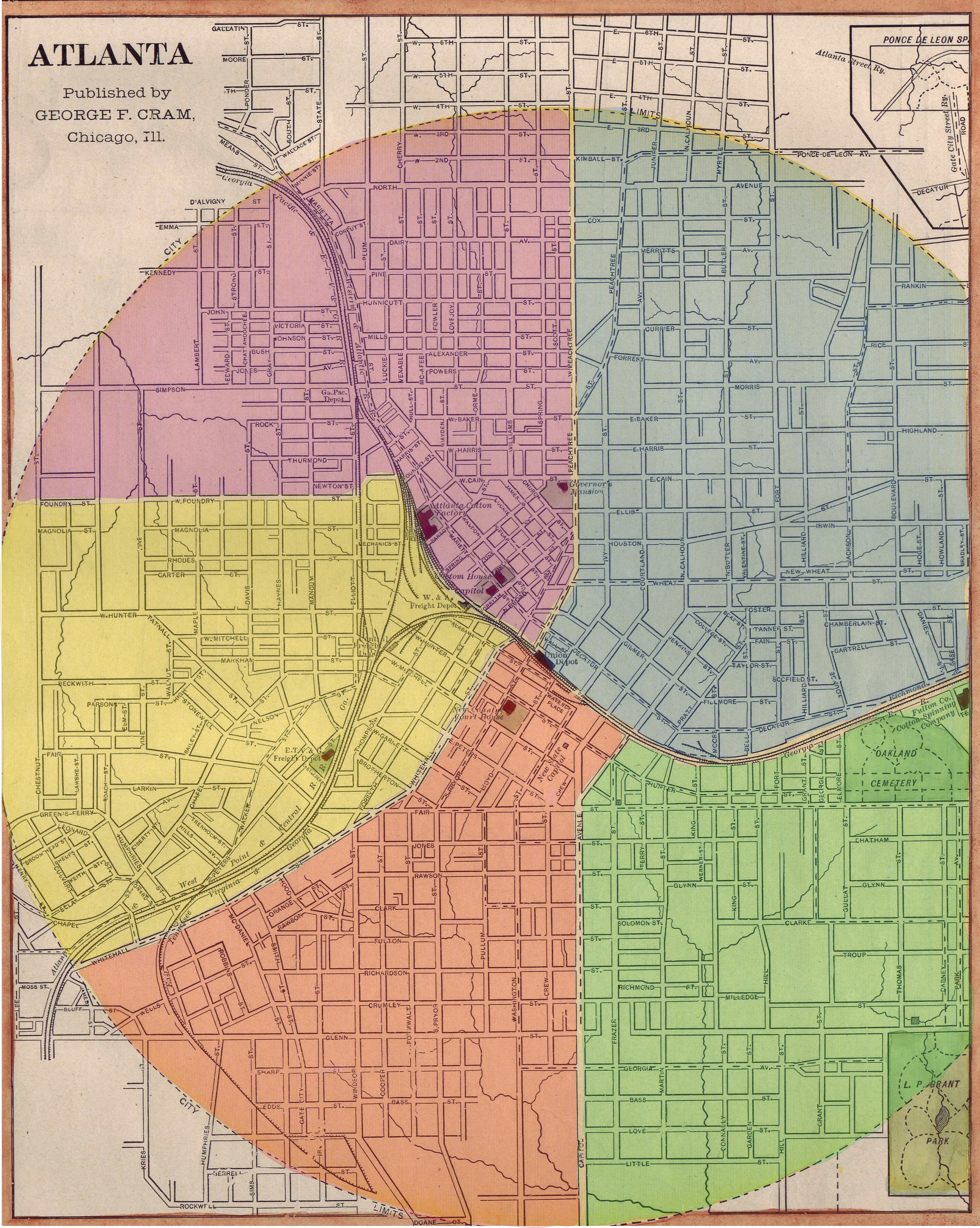
Fourth Ward in blue (1874 to 1883)

A new city charter increased the radius of the city from one to one and a half miles, reduced the number of wards back to five and created a bicameral council of two councilmen from each ward and a second body of three at-large aldermen was established.

The new Fourth ward layout was from Pryor and tracks east on Georgia RR to city limits then north west to West Peachtree and south to origin. Two councilmen would be elected from each ward each year.

John H. Flynn	1874	Julius C. Watkins
John H. Flynn	1875	John S. Garmany

In late 1875, an ordinance passed where each year one councilman would be elected from each ward for a two-year term. The first year, 1876 just had one citywide alderman and a single councilman from each ward and they would be fully staffed two years later.

Even year elections	Year	Odd year elections
Samuel Hape	1876	none
Samuel Hape	1877	Charles K. Maddox
John H. Flynn	1878	Charles K. Maddox
John H. Flynn	1879	William H. Patterson
Thomas J. Boyd	1880	William H. Patterson
Thomas J. Boyd	1881	Jack W. Johnson
William H. Howell	1882	Jack W. Johnson

=== 1883 ===
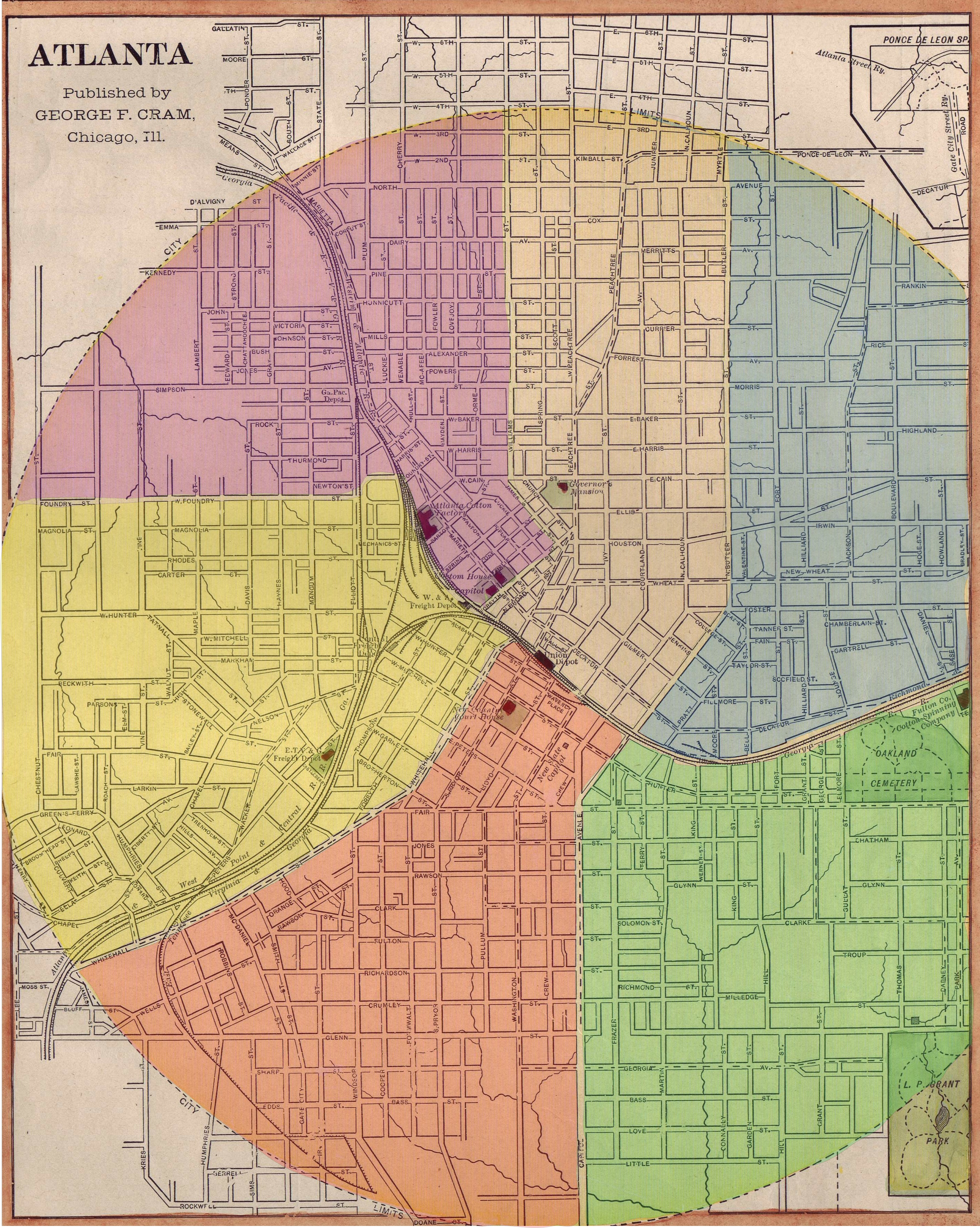
Fourth Ward in blue (1883 to 1894)

On November 5, 1883, a Sixth Ward (beige) was carved out of the Fourth and Fifth Wards. The Fourth lost the entire Peachtree St corridor leaving a district of working class citizens: Germans and Jews to the north and Blacks to the south. Before 1910, the ward had become almost exclusively Black centered on Sweet Auburn and a large portion of it was destroyed in the Great Atlanta fire of 1917.

Even year elections	Year	Odd year elections
William H. Howell	1883	Benjamin F. Longley
M. Micklebery	1884	Benjamin F. Longley
M. Micklebery	1885	Edwin F. May
Allison L. Greene	1886	Edwin F. May
Allison L. Greene	1887	Levi B. Nelson
Sampson A. Morris	1888	Levi B. Nelson
Sampson A. Morris	1889	J.S. McLendon
J.C. Hendrix	1890	J.S. McLendon
J.C. Hendrix	1891	C.E. Murphey
William P. Hill	1892	C.E. Murphey
William P. Hill	1893	W.R. Dimmock
William J. Campbell	1894	W.R. Dimmock
William J. Campbell	1895	John A. Miller
Sampson A. Morris	1896	John A. Miller
Sampson A. Morris	1897	George P. Howard
William S. Thomson	1898	George P. Howard
William S. Thomson	1899	John S. Parks
William M. Terry	1900	John S. Parks
William M. Terry	1901	Henry F. Garrett
J. Frank Beck	1902	Henry F. Garrett
J. Frank Beck	1903	McDonald M. Turner
Alexander C. Bruce	1904	McDonald M. Turner
Alexander C. Bruce	1905	Frank O. Foster
Edgar E. Pomeroy	1906	Frank O. Foster
Edgar E. Pomeroy	1907	Benjamin E. Pearce

=== 1935 ===
==== Aldermen ====
- Lee Evans
- Milton G. Farris

==== Councilmembers ====
- John T. Marler
- Roy Bell

=== 1954 ===
- Douglas Wood
- Guy R. Dunn

== List of councilmembers (1974–present) ==
- James Bond (1974–1986)
- Thomas Cuffie (1986–1994)
- Cleta Winslow (1994–2022)
- Jason Dozier (2022–present)

== See also ==
- Atlanta ward system
