= Willis Buell =

American politician (1790-1851)

3rd Mayor of Atlanta
- In office 1850–1851
- Preceded by: Benjamin Bomar
- Succeeded by: Jonathan Norcross

Personal details
- Born: 1790 Connecticut
- Died: November 1851 (aged 60–61) Atlanta, Georgia
- Party: Free and Rowdy Party

Willis (or Wyllys) Buell (c. 1790 – November 1851) was a native of Connecticut and third mayor of Atlanta.

== Biography ==
Willis Buell was born in Connecticut in 1790.

Buell's 1833 map of Muskingum County was among the first printed maps of any of Ohio's counties.

In the mid to late 1830s, he became the first Justice of the Peace of the 1026th militia district. He was a prosecuting attorney for the Supreme Court held in Muskingum from 1837 to April 1839.

In 1839, he was appointed by the City Council to serve on Zanesville's first board of examiners for its education system.

He lived in Georgia during the mid-1840s. Buell was among the original members of Atlanta's first Masonic lodge. He was known for his skill in portrait painting, establishing a studio within Atlanta's first Masonic Hall in 1847.

As a member of the Free and Rowdy Party, also known as the Rowdies, he served a single term as the third Mayor of Atlanta from January 1850 to January 1851, as stipulated by the city charter. Jonathan Norcross succeeded him as mayor.

== Death ==
Willis Buell died in Atlanta, Georgia in November 1851.

Preceded by Benjamin F. Bomar	Mayor of Atlanta; January 23, 1850 – January 1851	Succeeded by Jonathan Norcross
