= Benjamin Bomar =

American politician (1816–1868)

2nd Mayor of Atlanta
- In office January 17, 1849 – January 23, 1850
- Preceded by: Moses Formwalt
- Succeeded by: Willis Buell

Personal details
- Born: August 9, 1816 Spartanburg, South Carolina
- Died: February 1, 1868 (aged 51)

Benjamin Franklin Bomar (August 9, 1816 – February 1, 1868) was an alderman, clerk of the Superior Court and the second mayor of Atlanta, Georgia. He was born in South Carolina and trained as a medical doctor. In 1847, he and his family settled in the burgeoning town of Atlanta. After the town received its first charter, Bomar won election as alderman. He served for one year, before becoming mayor the following year. Bomar also co-founded Atlanta's Daily Intelligencer newspaper. Bomar served in the Civil War as a paymaster in the Georgia infantry. He returned from the war in poor health and died 3 years later.

== Early life ==
Bomar was born in Spartanburg, South Carolina, to Reverend Thomas Bomar and Elizabeth Carlton High and studied medicine in Charleston.

He practiced medicine in America's first gold rush town of Dahlonega, Georgia, for a number of years until he tired of the winters in the Appalachian Mountains. He heard good things about Texas from his brother, Gen. Alexander Carlton Bomar who was serving in the Mexican–American War, and decided to move his family there. En route to Texas with his wife Sarah Elizabeth Lumpkin Haynes of Cumming, Georgia, and two children, Bomar arrived in Atlanta on April 30, 1847, fell in love with the bustling young town and settled there, running a general merchandise business on Whitehall Street.

== Political career ==
The young town soon thereafter received its first charter, and elections were held December 1847. Moses Formwalt was elected mayor, Bomar its alderman, and five others were elected councilmen, all for one-year terms. The next year, in 1849, Bomar was elected mayor at the age of 32, as a member of the Free and Rowdy Party. He was sworn in on 17 January 1849. During his term, he selected and purchased six acres (24,000 m^{2}) at $75 per acre to serve as the new Oakland Cemetery.

In 1849, while serving as mayor, Bomar co-founded Atlanta's first successful newspaper, the Daily Intelligencer. He never practiced medicine regularly again.

When Fulton County was formed as Atlanta's new home in 1854, he became the first clerk of its Superior Court which he remained as late as 1859, when his residence was on the Marietta road a mile outside of town (roughly where Howell Mill Road splits off today).

== Later life ==
Benjamin Bomar was 44 years old at the outbreak of the American Civil War. He volunteered and served as the paymaster of Georgia's 28th Infantry, at a rank of captain. At the evacuation of the city following the Battle of Atlanta, his family refugeed to Macon, Georgia.

After Lee's surrender, he rejoined the family in Atlanta; but by then his health was broken and he died less than three years later in 1868. He was buried at Oakland Cemetery. His widow died in 1916, aged 91.

Preceded by Moses W. Formwalt	Mayor of Atlanta; January 17, 1849 – January 23, 1850	Succeeded by Willis Buell
