= 1876 Georgia gubernatorial election =

- October 4, 1876
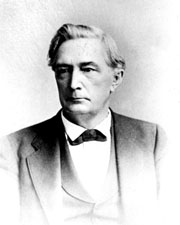

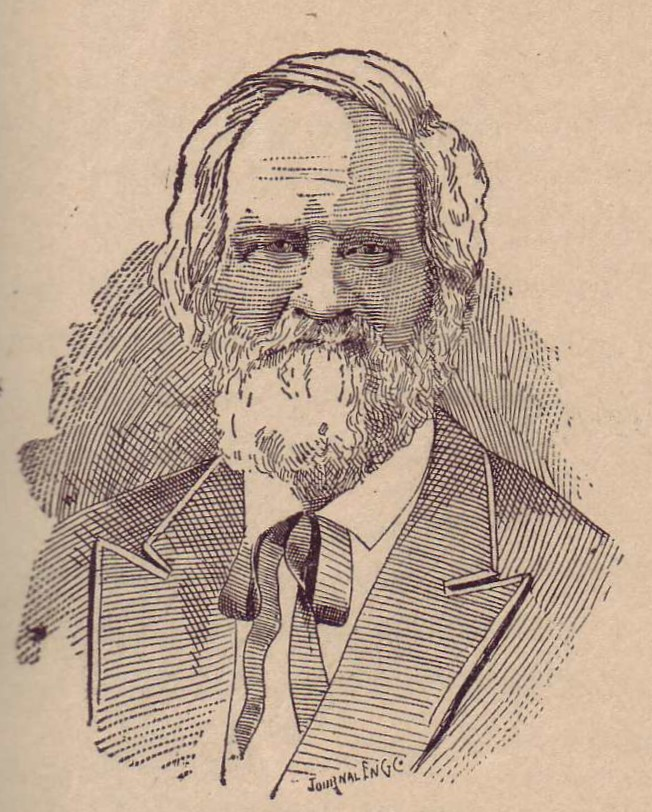
Nominee	Alfred H. Colquitt	Jonathan Norcross
Party	Democratic	Republican
Popular vote	111,297	33,443
Percentage	76.89%	23.11%
- Results by County: Colquitt: 50–60% 60–70% 70–80% 80–90% >90% Norcross: 50–60% 60–70% 80–90% No Data
Governor before election
James Milton Smith
Democratic
Elected Governor
Alfred H. Colquitt
Democratic

The 1876 Georgia gubernatorial election was held on October 4, 1876. to elect the next Governor of Georgia. Democratic candidate and former United States Representative from Georgia's 2nd congressional district. Alfred H. Colquitt defeated Republican candidate and former Mayor of Atlanta Jonathan Norcross.

== General election ==
On election day, October 4, 1876, Democratic nominee Alfred H. Colquitt won the election by a margin of 77,854 votes against his opponent Republican nominee Jonathan Norcross, thereby holding Democratic control over the office of Governor. Colquitt was sworn in as the 49th Governor of Georgia on January 12, 1877.

=== Results ===
Georgia gubernatorial election, 1876
Party	Candidate	Votes	%
Democratic	Alfred H. Colquitt	111,297	76.89
Republican	Jonathan Norcross	33,443	23.11
Total votes		144,740	100.00
Democratic hold			
