= Free and Rowdy Party =

Political party in Atlanta, Georgia

The Free and Rowdy Party was a political party that operated in Atlanta, Georgia, during the middle of the 19th century. Although the mayoral elections of Atlanta are not contested along party lines, the first three mayors of the city were "Rowdies", as members of the Free and Rowdy Party were called. They were Moses Formwalt, Benjamin Bomar, and Willis Buell, each serving one year as per the city charter.

The Rowdies included many owners of distilleries, bars and brothels, and represented most of what the city was, especially as an outpost along the railroads. They existed in direct opposition to the Moral Party, which called for temperance and chastity. The two parties were also said to differ on approaches to civil engagement; the Rowdies were the party of militant disorder, and the Moral Party promoted law and order.

Atlanta's fourth mayor, Jonathan Norcross, was a member of the Moral Party, and used city hall to so harass the Rowdies that many moved out of Slabtown, which was then incorporated into the city, to places like Snake Nation and Murrell's Row.
