= Zachariah A. Rice =

American politician (1822–1890)

Zachariah Armstead Rice (September 15, 1822 – July 2, 1890) was an American businessman who was prominent in the city of Atlanta, Georgia, in the decades before and after the Civil War. In addition to investments in textile mills, general merchandise stores, and real estate, Rice was a slave trader, Confederate officer, city councilman, and newspaper publisher of the Daily Intelligencer.

== Early years and business ventures ==
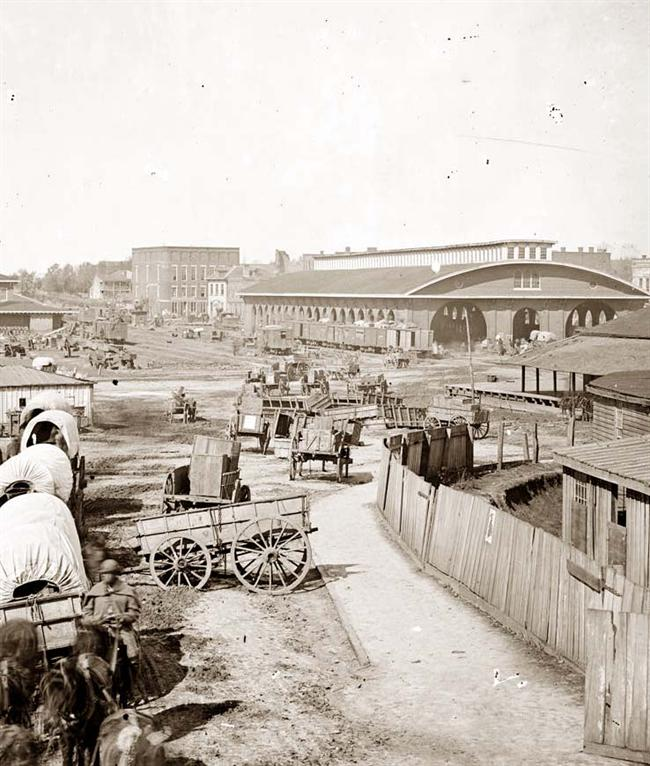
State Square and Depot - Atlanta. Washington Hall Hotel is in the background

Zachariah Armstead Rice was born on September 15, 1822, in Spartanburg County, South Carolina, to Parker Merimunth Rice and Mary Willamina (Bomar) Rice. In 1829, when Rice was about 7, the family moved to Campbell County, Georgia (just west of present-day Fulton County), where his father became an ordained Baptist minister, and established a local church. One year later, the elder Rice co-founded First Baptist Church of Atlanta. At the age of 17, young Rice found work as a clerk in a general store. Three years later, in 1843, at the age of twenty-one he owned a successful shop of his own. Within four years, his wealth and business expertise had increased to the point that he formed the general merchandise partnership of Rice & Holcomb leasing the Washington Hall Hotel, in Atlanta, as their place of business.

In 1849, he was a founding partner in yet another enterprise, the Atlanta newspaper Daily Intelligencer.

Despite a history of building success upon success, in a focused effort to establish ever-larger businesses in the city of Atlanta, Rice took an abrupt turn toward adventure when he left for the California gold fields in the Gold Rush of 1849. Rice had previously prospected for gold in Villa Rica, Georgia, in 1844, but that enterprise yielded little more than $1.00 per day. Rice spent four years, mining gold and quartz, in California. His efforts are described as being "somewhat successful".

Rice returned to Atlanta in 1854, and resumed his various businesses. On May 15, 1855, he married Louisa Ritter Green. The couple had five children. His later correspondence with Louisa offers insight into military life of a Confederate cavalry officer during the Civil War, as well as the particulars of several battles.

Among the various business ventures undertaken by Rice, after his return from the California gold fields, is one noted in the 1859 Atlanta City Directory. It lists "Watkins & Rice - slave dealers". Rice's rise in wealth and stature within the Atlanta business community coincided with his establishment within the circle of civic elites. In 1856, he was appointed to the position of Justice of the Fulton County Inferior Court.

== Military service ==
With the onset of the Civil War in 1861, Rice volunteered to serve in the Confederate Army. At the age of thirty-eight, he signed with a company of cavalry raised in Atlanta, on August 14, 1861. Known as the Fulton Dragoons, it eventually became part of Cobb's Legion, organized by Thomas Reade Rootes Cobb, brother of Howell Cobb, former governor of Georgia and former speaker of the United States House of Representatives. The Fulton Dragoons were led by Capt. Benjamin C. Yancey. The Dragoons quickly proceeded, by train, to the front. On August 17, they were in Petersburg, Virginia. A week later, the company moved to Richmond where, on August 28, Rice was appointed first lieutenant of Yancey's company. Over the course of his service in Cobb's Legion, Rice would write more than 63 letters to his wife, offering insight into the life of a Confederate cavalry officer, as well as details of campaigns and events in which he was engaged.

=== Peninsula Campaign and beyond ===
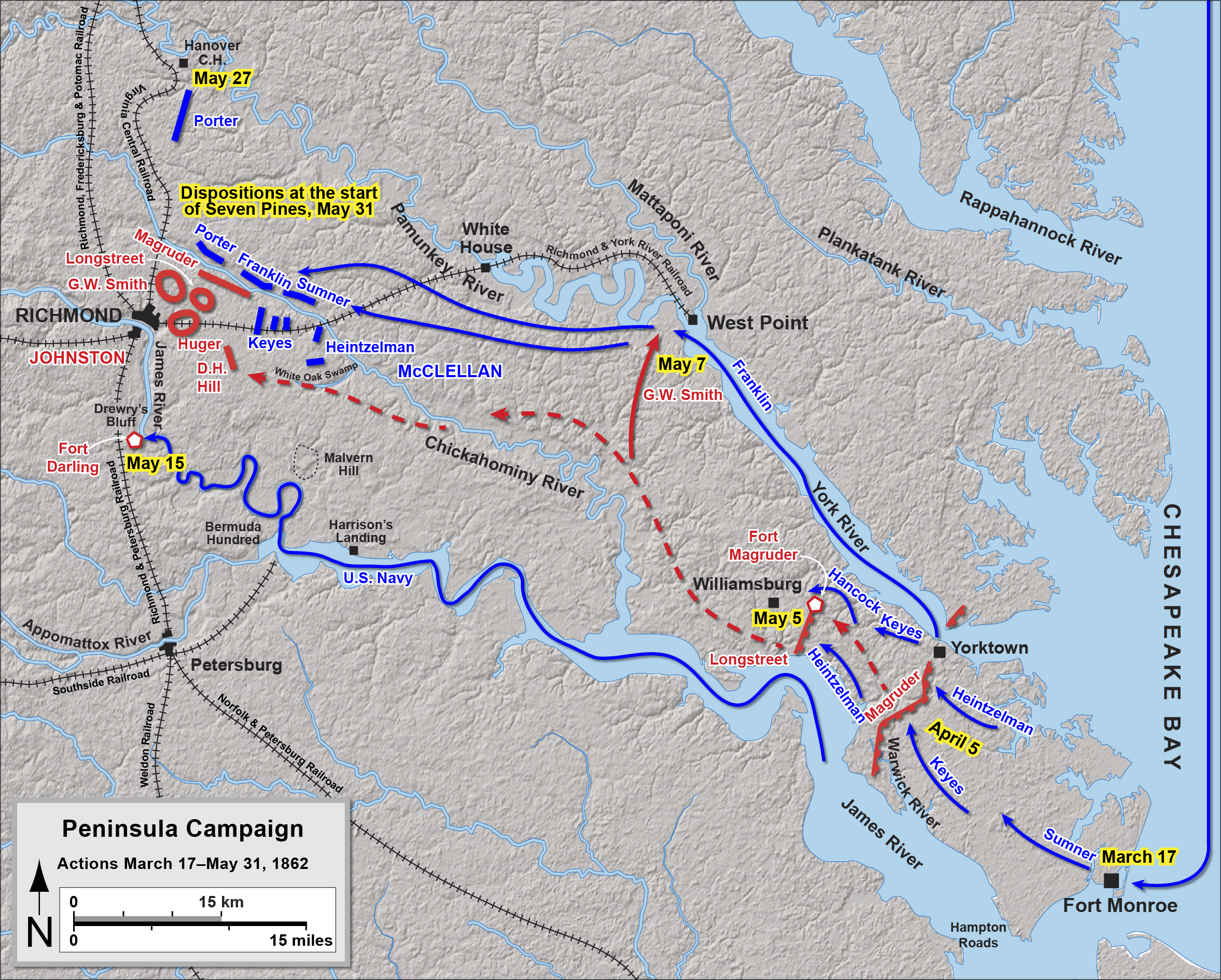
Peninsula Campaign March 17 - May 31, 1862

By mid-September they encamped outside of Yorktown, within sight of the Federal fleet, offshore. In the months that followed, the Peninsula Campaign was very quiet for Rice and his company, who had little more to do than construct winter quarters. In November Rice was given a 25-day furlough which he used to return to Atlanta. When he returned to camp, he found that he had been elected captain, and the new company commander, effective December 17, 1861. The promotion brought with it additional duties, which left Rice with much less time for letters home. In March, Rice and the other Georgians were ordered to proceed to Suffolk, where they arrived on March 11, 1862.

Over the following month, Rice and Cobb's cavalry moved about, reaching Goldsboro, North Carolina, before eventually being ordered to return to the Peninsula, as the campaign there began taking shape with a large battle looming. Rice and Cobb's cavalry were the last to join the Legion, in mid-April, where infantry and artillery had already assumed positions along the front line. Rice and Cobb's cavalry took up positions in the rear, and eventually were positioned to guard Richmond, as the Peninsula Campaign wore on. For the remaining campaign in the Peninsula, Rice and his cavalry would find themselves near, but always out of the action. With the appointment of Robert E. Lee as commander, the Confederate Army went on the offense against the Federal troops. Rice at one point wrote to his wife stating that the hard riding, reconnaissance, and picket duty required of them during Lee's actions against the Federal line had left him in the same clothes for a period of 10 days. Captain Rice was promoted to Major on January 9, 1863.

=== Return to Atlanta ===
On May 20, 1863, less than four months after his promotion, Major Rice submitted his letter of resignation, citing "..the Afflictions in my family, and business at home". Whatever Rice's activities were, upon his arrival back home, are unknown. But he must certainly have been viewed as a citizen in good standing, since he was elected to the Atlanta City Council in December 1863. In 1864, as Sherman approached the city at the beginning of the Battle of Atlanta, Rice was appointed lieutenant colonel of the Fulton County Militia, under the command of General G.W. Smith. After federal troops burned the city, then abandoned it, Rice returned in late December to help restore order. He remained a member of the City Council until mid-1865.

== Post war activities ==
After the war, Rice resumed business activity in much the same way as he had before. According to Atlanta historian, Wallace P. Reed, "When [Rice] returned to Atlanta after the war, and discouragement was in the hearts of many, over the ruin of their home and business interest, he was among the comparatively few who inspired hope in the people by bravely and encouragingly setting to work to repair his well nigh ruined fortune". Rice built a cotton-spinning factory in Campbell County, and owned Concord Woolen Mills on Nickajack Creek, and a working farm in Cobb County, as well as other real estate investments. Around 1874, he established a residence at 119 Walton Street, in Atlanta. In 1884 he was once again elected to the Atlanta City Council, for a two-year term.

== Death ==
Zachariah A. Rice died on July 2, 1890, in Atlanta. He was buried in historic Oakland Cemetery. On August 2, 1890, a notice was published in the Atlanta Constitution declaring that Parker M. Rice and John W. Rice had applied for Letters of Administration in the estate. His estate was valued at US$78,000 (equivalent to $2,795,000 in 2025).

== See also ==
- List of Georgia slave traders
