= Daily Intelligencer (Atlanta) =

First daily newspaper in Atlanta, Georgia, USA (1849–1871)

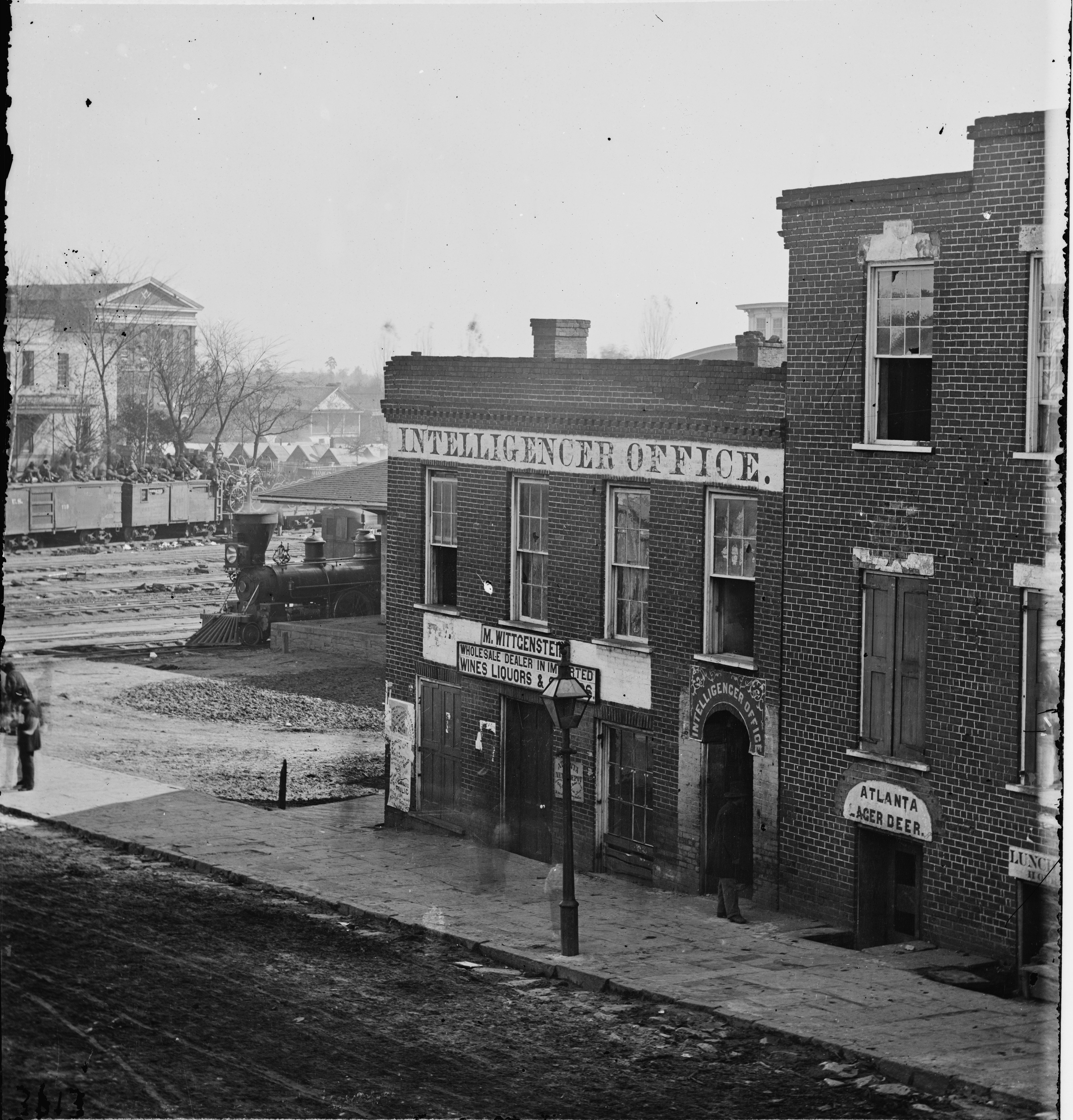
- Office of the Intelligencer shortly after the surrender of Atlanta
- Founder(s): Benjamin Bomar, Zachariah A. Rice, Jonathan Norcross and Ira O. McDaniel
- Founded: June 1, 1849; 176 years ago
- Ceased publication: April 24, 1871
- OCLC number: 20942138

The Intelligencer was a weekly, and later daily newspaper first published in Atlanta on June 1, 1849 as The Weekly Intelligencer. The founders were Benjamin Bomar, Zachariah A. Rice, Jonathan Norcross and Ira O. McDaniel. During the American Civil War, the newspaper had great trouble acquiring paper from its supplier, the paper mill at Sope Creek.

In 1864, it was purchased by Jared Whitaker, who briefly moved it to Macon during the war. He moved it back to Atlanta after the war, and it was the only city paper to survive. John H. Steele served as its editor from 1860 until his death in January 1871. Captain Evan Howell was its city editor starting in 1868.

The paper closed in April 1871, soon after Steele's death and after intense competition from the new Atlanta Constitution. The newer paper bought at auction the mechanical equipment of the Intelligencer. At that same auction, Whitaker purchased the archives and other paperwork.
