= Norcross Building =

Coordinates: 33.7543°N 84.3901°W

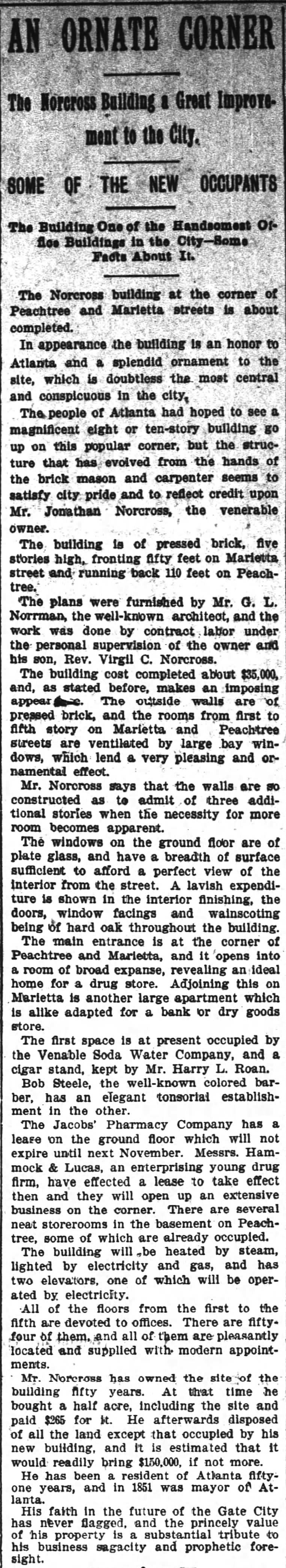
Atlanta Constitution article about the opening of the 1894 Norcross Building

The Norcross Building (4 Marietta Street NW, Atlanta) occupied the southwest corner of Peachtree Street and Marietta Street at Five Points in downtown Atlanta. Today the Andrew Young School of Policy Studies is located on the site. The building was owned by Jonathan Norcross, "father of Atlanta."

An 1859 directory already lists a Norcross Building in this location at that time. Mr. Norcross had owned the site since at least 1844, having paid $265 for the lot.

== 1894 building ==
In 1894 a new landmark Norcross Building went up which stood until destroyed by fire in December 1902. The Atlanta Constitution called the building "one of the handsomest office buildings in the city", "an honor to Atlanta" and " a splendid ornament to the site". The construction was of pressed brick, five stories high, fronting 50 feet (15 m) on Marietta Street and 110 feet (34 m) on Peachtree Street, with large ornamental bay windows. The architect was G.L. Norman. The building cost about $35,000 to complete. The interiors were lavish, with hard oak doors, window facings and wainscoting. There were two elevators, one electric. The building was constructed to allow for up to 3 additional stories, which are in place on a photo from the Atlanta History Center's collection.

The building was immediately replaced by a new fourteen-story steel building, ultimately known as the Fourth National Bank Building.

== Tenants ==
The building was next-to-last location for Alonzo Herndon's barbershop.

Other tenants included, at one time or another:

- Nonesuch Lunchroom
- Venable Soda Water Company
- Harry L. Roan's cigar stand
- Bob Steele, "colored barber"
- Jacobs' Pharmacy, later Hammock & Lucas Pharmacy
