= Jonathan Norcross =

American politician (1808-1898)

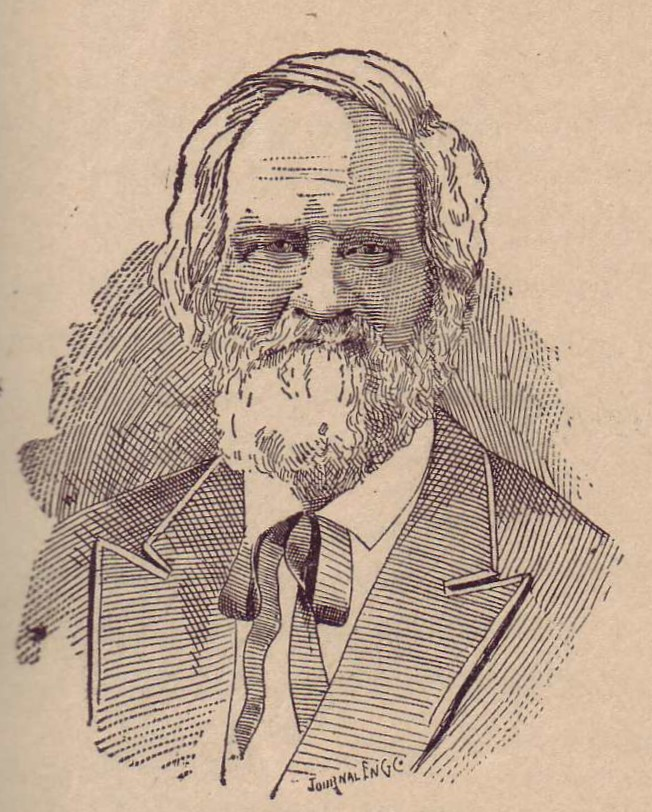

4th Mayor of Atlanta
- In office 1851–1852
- Preceded by: Willis Buell
- Succeeded by: Thomas Gibbs

Personal details
- Born: April 18, 1808 Orono, Maine
- Died: December 18, 1898 (aged 90) Atlanta, Georgia
- Party: Moral Party

Jonathan Norcross (April 18, 1808 – December 18, 1898) was elected in 1850 as the fourth Mayor of Atlanta, Georgia, serving the customary term at the time of one year. Dubbed the "Father of Atlanta" and "hard fighter of everything" by publisher Henry W. Grady, he followed three mayors elected from the Free and Rowdy Party.

== Early life, family and education ==
Born on April 18, 1808, in Orono, Maine, Jonathan Norcross was the second son of clergyman Jesse Norcross, a Baptist minister from Penobscot, and his wife Nancy (née Gaubert) from Dresden, Maine. He had six siblings, including older brother Nicholas Gaubert Norcross (see last section below). His younger siblings include: Livonia (b. January 1810), brother Jesse (b. June 3, 1812), Nancy Gaubert (b. March 2, 1816), who married Moses M. Swan of Augusta, Maine; Maria (b. February 1818), and Louisa Norcross (b. October 1823). After the death of Nancy, his second wife was Mary Ann Hill.

Their paternal immigrant ancestor was Jeremiah Norcross from England, who settled in Watertown, Massachusetts Bay Colony in 1638. The immigrant owned land in Cambridge before 1642, and was a freeman of that town in 1652. The branches of the family became established early in New England.

Norcross attended common schools and was taught the trade of millwright. As a young man he went to Cuba, where he helped construct a mill for processing sugar. While attending lectures in mechanics at the Franklin Institute, Philadelphia, Pennsylvania, Norcross principally studied arts and sciences.

== 1833 move to the South ==
Norcross left Pennsylvania in 1833 to teach school at an academy in North Carolina. (There were essentially no public schools in the South in the antebellum years.) He moved to Georgia in 1835, in the period of new development after Indian Removal of the Five Civilized Tribes from the Southeast by United States military forces to Indian Territory west of the Mississippi River. Norcross lived first in Augusta, then settled in the area that developed as Atlanta.

In 1836, he took charge of lumber interests in southern Georgia for Northern capitalists. While in Putnam County, Georgia, he filed a patent, US 3210 for a Reciprocating Mill-Saw Guide in August 1843. From these efforts, he developed a vertical saw with a circular wheel 40 feet in diameter. It could be adjusted in an almost horizontal position, with a capacity to saw approximately 1,000 feet of lumber per day.

In August 1844, Norcross settled in Marthasville, Georgia, then the terminus of the Georgia Railroad. He became a sawmill operator and dry goods merchant. His sawmill mostly produced railroad ties and string timbers for construction of the railroad.

Norcross described the excitement attendant to the arrival of the first trains at the station in 1845:

I recalled very well the first train of cars over the Georgia Railroad. It was on the 15th of September, 1845. The train came in about dark. Judge King was on board and a great many others. There were a great many people out, and there was a good deal of excitement. There was a well in the square here, and such was the excitement, and it being dark, a man fell into the well and was drowned. Judge King came very near falling in there, also. It was dark, and he was just on the brink of stepping in when someone caught him and saved him. I suppose there were about twenty families here at the time.

Poor workers and settlers used the leavings of the mill as timbers for shanties; this area became known as Slabtown. Dominated by railway workers and their tastes, it was considered a center of vice: brothels, saloons, and gambling. This area was cleared in 1902 by disguised paramilitary known as White Caps. The site was later redeveloped for Grady Memorial Hospital.

In 1845 the railroad terminus of Marthasville was renamed as Atlanta (it was chartered in December 1847). Norcross commented that many decisions were made in haste: "[t]he reason why the streets are so crooked is that every man built on his land just to suit himself."

In 1849 Norcross co-founded the Daily Intelligencer newspaper.

In 1851 Norcross was among two dozen founders of the Atlanta National Bank. These men believed a growing town needed its own bank. But the first charter Bank of Atlanta was unsuccessful. Given regional economic instability, there had been a bank "run" in 1845; after another occurred in October 1855, the director closed this bank. On March 6, 1856, Norcross and others incorporated the Bank of Fulton; this second bank of Atlanta had greater success.

Norcross owned the 1894 landmark Norcross Building at Five Points in what became Downtown Atlanta. It was destroyed by fire in 1902.

== Political and civic life ==
Norcross unsuccessfully ran for mayor in 1848, in the town's first election, when fewer than 225 white men voted (women and free blacks did not have the franchise). Moses W. Formwalt of the Free and Rowdy Party won. The mayoral term was only one year, and two more Rowdy candidates were elected before Norcross ran again in 1850, representing the Moral Party against Leonard C. Simpson, an attorney and candidate for the Free and Rowdy Party. Norcross won as a "temperance man who hated civic disturbances"; he presented a choice between civilian law and order and the bellicose Rowdies. The 40 drinking establishments and thriving red light district of Slabtown offended the mores of evangelicals and they believed this contributed to problems for families in the railroad town.

As mayor, Norcross served also as both de jure Chief of Police and Superintendent of Atlanta's Streets. He intended to use public shaming to persuade the Rowdies to move a mile south-west to "Snake Nation".

Norcross's political platform suggested that the Moral Party could be viewed as "American statesmen defend[-ing] their principles of 'classical republicanism', with arguments drawn from Aristotle, Publius, and Cicero".

== Faltering prewar railroad industry ==
As a businessman, Norcross supported railroad construction to link Atlanta to other cities and coastal ports. "[T]he key issue before inland cities like Atlanta was transportation, and the railroad was the key to commercial prosperity."

On April 3, 1856, Norcross was among 16 founders of the Air Line Railway, for which he served as president. It was planned to run through the Carolinas and Virginia to carry freight between New York, Atlanta, and New Orleans. The Georgia General Assembly did not approve the project, largely because of intense lobbying from the competing Georgia Western Railroad and Central of Georgia Railway. After Norcross gained a bond commitment from the city of Atlanta, Lemuel Grant joined the list of adversaries supporting a different route (Georgia Western Railway). By 1860 both rail ventures were dead. New railroad construction did not take place until after the Civil War.

== Secession and Civil War ==
Norcross opposed the state's vote for secession in 1861. In 1865, then aged in his late 50s, he was one of the Committee of Citizens (with William Markham) who surrendered the town to Union General Henry Slocum.

== Candidate for governor ==
In 1876, near the end of the Reconstruction era, Norcross ran as the Republican nominee for Governor of Georgia. He was defeated by Democrat Alfred H. Colquitt, at a time of intense efforts by Democrats to disrupt and suppress Republican voting, especially by freedmen, with a combination of fraud and violence. White conservative Democrats took back control of the state legislature and governorship.

Norcross made an impassioned speech, from which The New York Times printed an excerpt.

== Publications ==
In the late nineteenth century, beginning in 1865, Norcross began to publish some essays about politics:

- The History of Democracy: Considered as a Party Name and as a Political Organization. New York: G. P. Press, 1883.
- Democracy Examined: Or, a Conversation Between a Republican and a Moderate Democrat. Pub. J. P. Harrison, 1880.
- Common-Sense: Views of State Sovereignty versus United States Supremacy. The Atlantic Republican, Print, 1876.
- The Conflict of Labor and Capital. New Era Print, 1870.
- The Anarchical and Revolutionary Character of a Democratic Party: A Supplement to "Democracy Considered as a Party Name, and as a Political Organization." Atlanta: Pub. Jas. P. Harrison & Co., 1865.

== Marriage and family ==
Norcross in April 1845 had married the widow [Mrs.] Harriet N. [Bogle] (from Montgomery, Alabama, born in Blount Co., Tennessee). She died in August 1876. They had a son together, Virgil C. Norcross, who became a clergyman and pastor of the First Baptist Church (orig. James' Chapel). He married Lydia F. Howes on May 19, 1875, in Bibb, Georgia.

On September 4, 1877, the widower Jonathan Norcross married again, to Mary Ann Hill, in Fulton, Georgia.

== Death and legacy ==
The last surviving antebellum mayor of Atlanta, Norcross died at his home in Atlanta on December 18, 1898, at age 90. He is buried in Oakland Cemetery in Atlanta, in a marked grave, Section 10, Block 140, Lot 3. Norcross, Georgia, a city in the suburbs of Atlanta, is named in his honor.

== Nicholas Gaubert Norcross ==
Nicholas G. Norcross, the older brother of Norcross, was born December 25, 1805, also in Orono, Maine. He married Sophronia Pratt and moved to Bangor, where he established a career in the lumber industry. He finally settled in Lowell, Massachusetts, also an area for lumber, as well as textile mills that became increasingly important to the economy. There Norcross was known as "The Lumber King" of Lowell. His daughter Caroline married Charles Wesley Saunders, who also became known in the local lumber industry and in politics.

== Footnotes ==
This article incorporates text from the public domain 1902 book Atlanta And Its Builders by Thomas H. Martin

Party political offices
Preceded by D. Walker	Republican nominee for Governor of Georgia; 1876	Vacant Title next held by Roscoe Pickett
Preceded by Willis Buell	Mayor of Atlanta; 1851–1852	Succeeded by Thomas F. Gibbs
