= Moses Formwalt =

American politician (1820–1852)

Moses W. Formwalt

1st Mayor of Atlanta
- In office 1848–1849
- Preceded by: Position created
- Succeeded by: Benjamin F. Bomar

Personal details
- Born: 1820 Tennessee
- Died: May 26, 1852 (aged 31-32) DeKalb County, Georgia

Moses W. Formwalt (1820 – May 26, 1852) was the first mayor of the city of Atlanta, which was then in DeKalb County, Georgia. Atlanta was chartered in December 1847 (the name had been changed from Marthasville in December 1845), and the first election of officers took place on January 29, 1848. Formwalt drew a larger share of the 215 votes than Jonathan Norcross and was elected mayor, representing the Free and Rowdy Party. First meeting of the city council followed on February 2 at the Jonas Smith grocery (site of the Howard Johnson hotel near Five Points). Things proceeded pretty normally throughout his one-year term: roads were cut, wells dug, law and order somewhat maintained (a jail was built); and on January 17, 1849, Dr. Benjamin F. Bomar succeeded him as mayor.

Born in Tennessee, Formwalt came to Decatur in 1836 and established a tin shop on Decatur St. in Atlanta in 1846 where one of his most popular products were stills. He became mayor at age 28. Two years after leaving office, he began serving as deputy sheriff of DeKalb County; a short time later he was stabbed to death by a prisoner while escorting him from the council chamber.

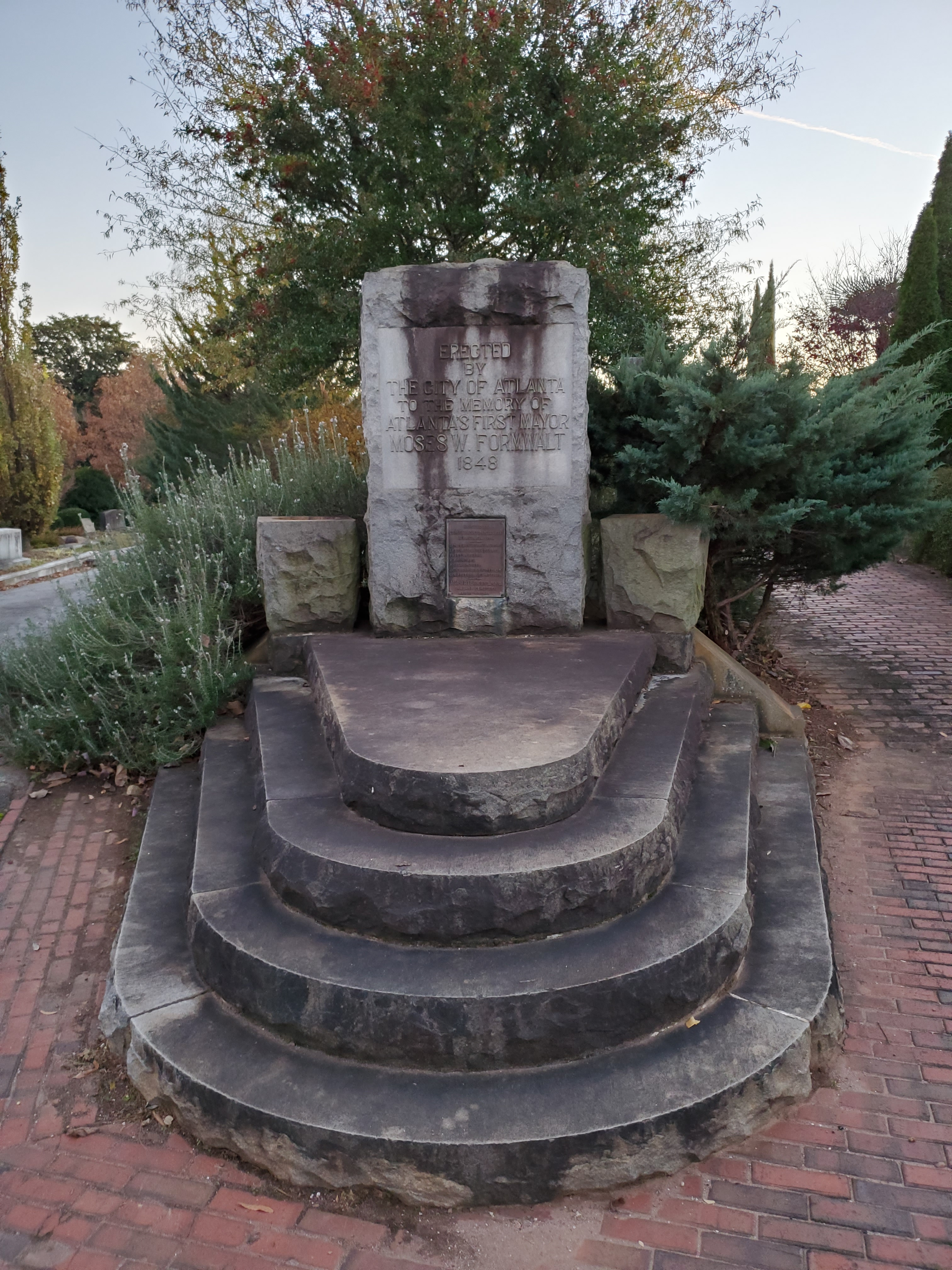
Monument erected at his burial site in Oakland Cemetery.

He was buried at Oakland Cemetery and is honored by Formwalt Street just southwest of downtown.

Preceded by –	Mayor of Atlanta; 1848–1849	Succeeded by Benjamin F. Bomar
