= Atlanta's 5th City Council district =

Ward of Atlanta

Atlanta's 5th City Council district is one of the twelve geographic districts in the Atlanta City Council. It is currently represented by Liliana Bakhtiari, who was elected in 2022 after defeating challenger Mandy Mahoney to succeed incumbent Natalyn Mosby Archibong.

The district was created in 1973 after a new city charter was passed, which replaced the former at-large six-member Board of Aldermen with a 15-member City Council of 12 districts and 6 (later 3) at-large posts. A previous Fifth Ward existed in various forms from 1854 to 1954.

== History ==
Atlanta's Fifth Ward encompassed mainly what is now the part of downtown and midtown between the west side of Peachtree and the Western and Atlantic Railroad.

== List of aldermen (1854-1954) ==
=== 1854 ===
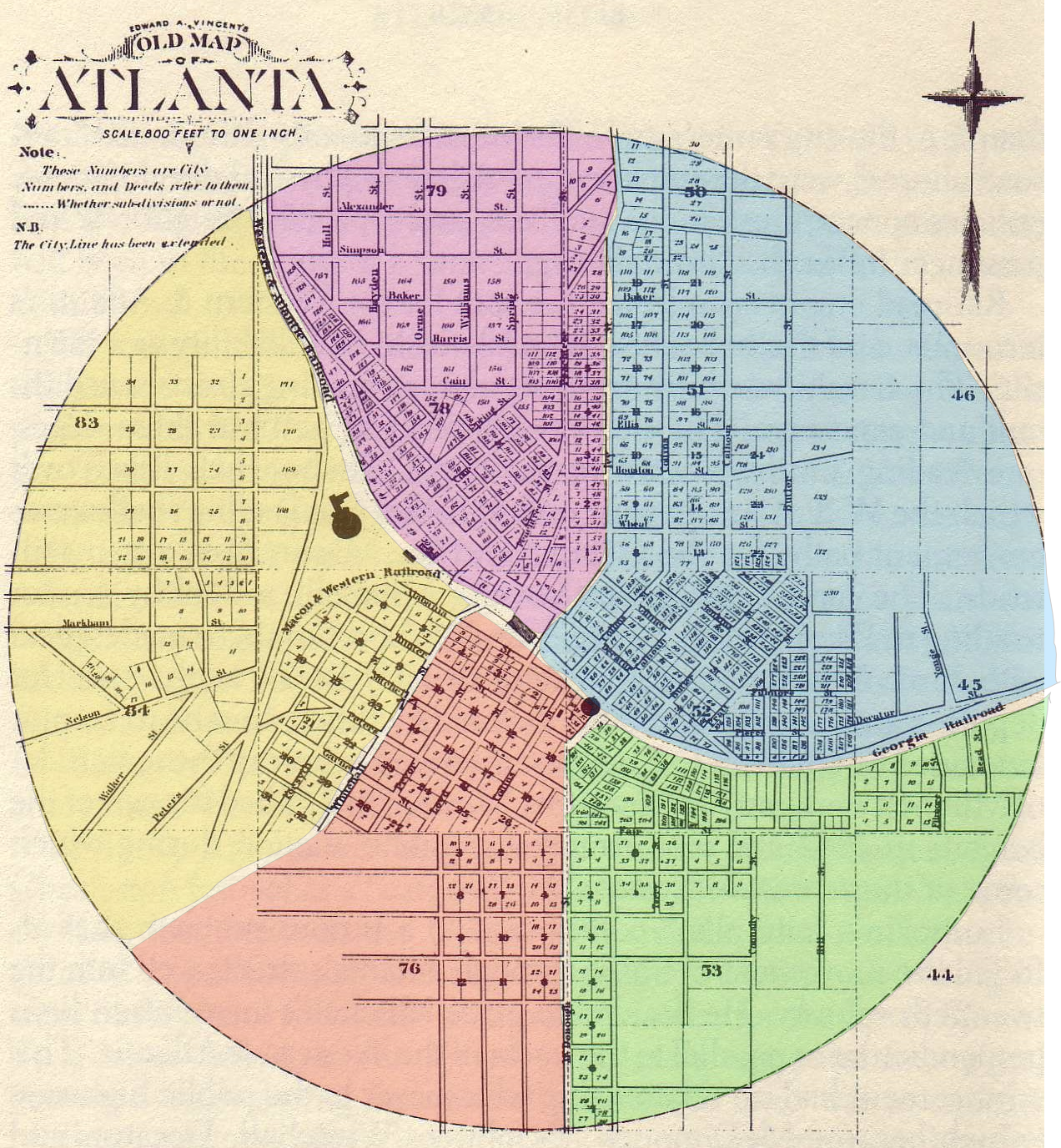
Fifth Ward in purple (1854–1871)

The 1848 charter only specified election of six citywide councilmembers, but on January 9, 1854 an ordinance was adopted that divided the town into five wards and two councilmen from each ward would be elected to coincide with the completion of the first official city hall. The next election with the new rules on January 15, 1855 decided those first Ward bosses who would serve with the short-term mayor, Allison Nelson. The Fifth Ward was laid out west of Ivy and north of A&W Railroad. This ward contained the large homes along Peachtree Street and the southern part, Fairlie-Poplar was also largely residential with warehousing along the western part.

=== 1871 ===
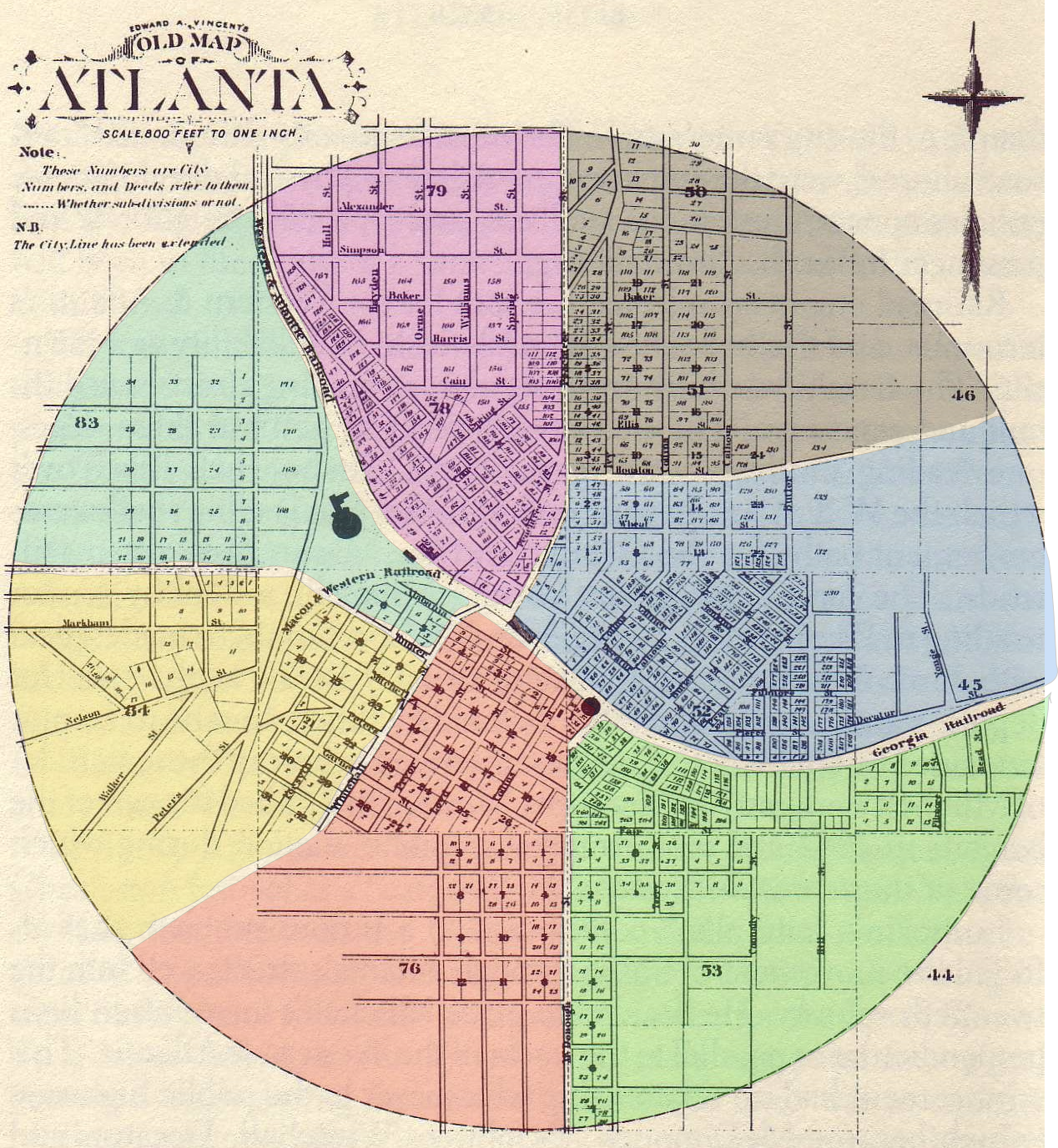
Fifth Ward in purple (1871 to 1874)

During a huge boom of post-war building, two new wards were added from parts of the First, Fourth and Fifth to reflect the changing look of the city. This would be the layout until the city limits were expanded in 1874.

Parts of the Fourth and Fifth Wards were taken to form a Seventh Ward (grey) established on December 2, 1871. Specifically from the "junction of Houston and Pryor streets, thence through lot nineteen, between blocks three, one and two, five and six, to the city limits; thence northerly along the city limits to Peachtree Street; thence south along Peachtree Street and Pryor Street to the beginning." And the Fourth was extended "from Ivy Street west to Pryor, and from Houston Street south to the railroad, and that Pryor Street shall be the line between the fourth and fifth wards, and Pryor and Peachtree streets between the fifth and seventh wards." This gave the red-light district to the Fourth and created a new Ward of mostly farmers and to the west, fine residences along Ivy and the east side of Peachtree.

=== 1874 ===
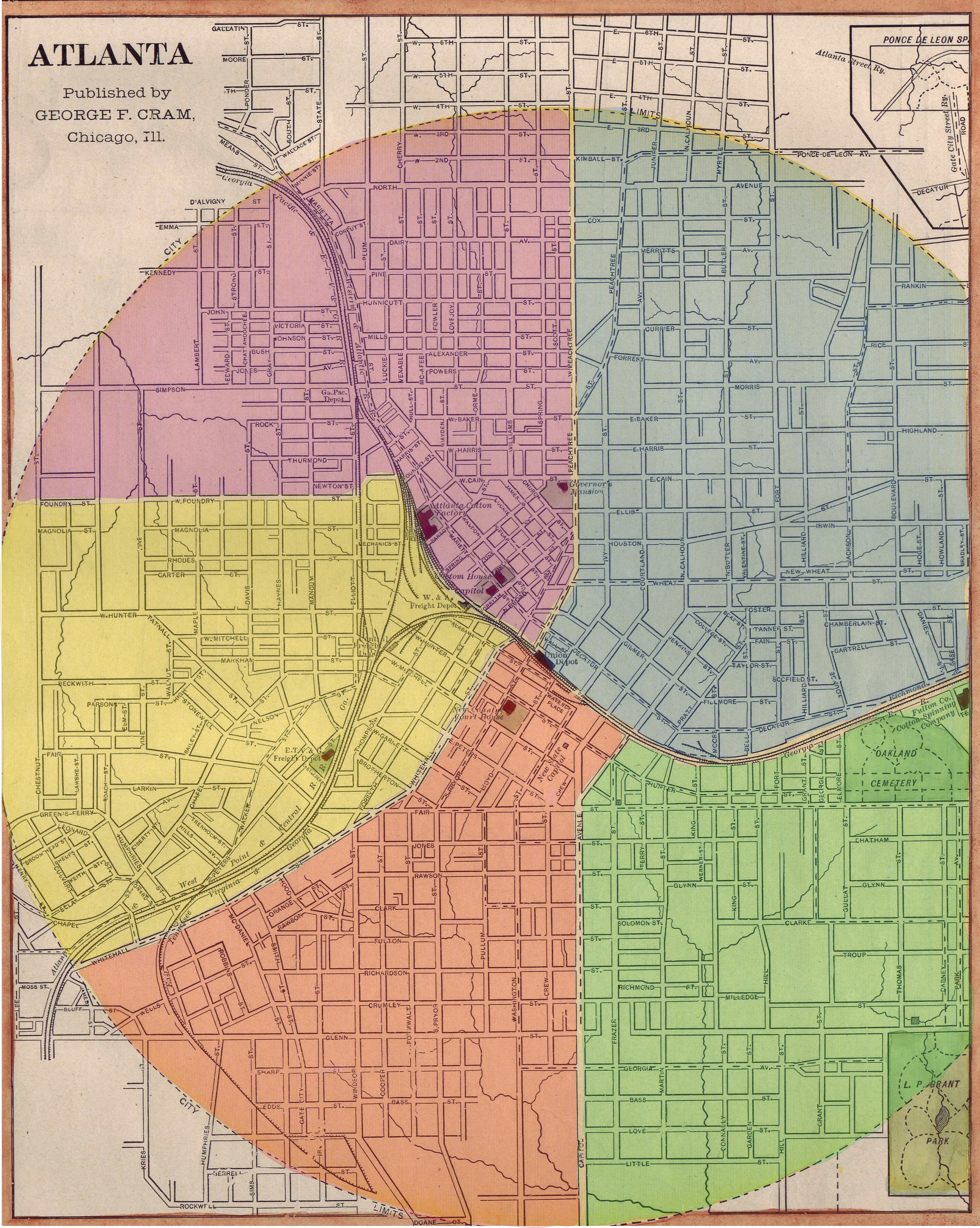
Fifth Ward in purple (1874 to 1883)

A new city charter increased the radius of the city from one to one and a half miles, reduced the number of wards back to five and created a bicameral council of two councilmen from each ward and a second body of three at-large aldermen was established.

The new Fifth ward layout was from Pryor and tracks north-east to Peachtree, then West Peachtree to city limits, south-west to Foundry and W&A RR and east to origin. Two councilmen would be elected from each ward each year.

In late 1875, an ordinance passed where each year one councilman would be elected from each ward for a two-year term. The first year, 1876 just had one citywide alderman and a single councilman from each ward, and they would be fully staffed two years later.

=== 1883 ===
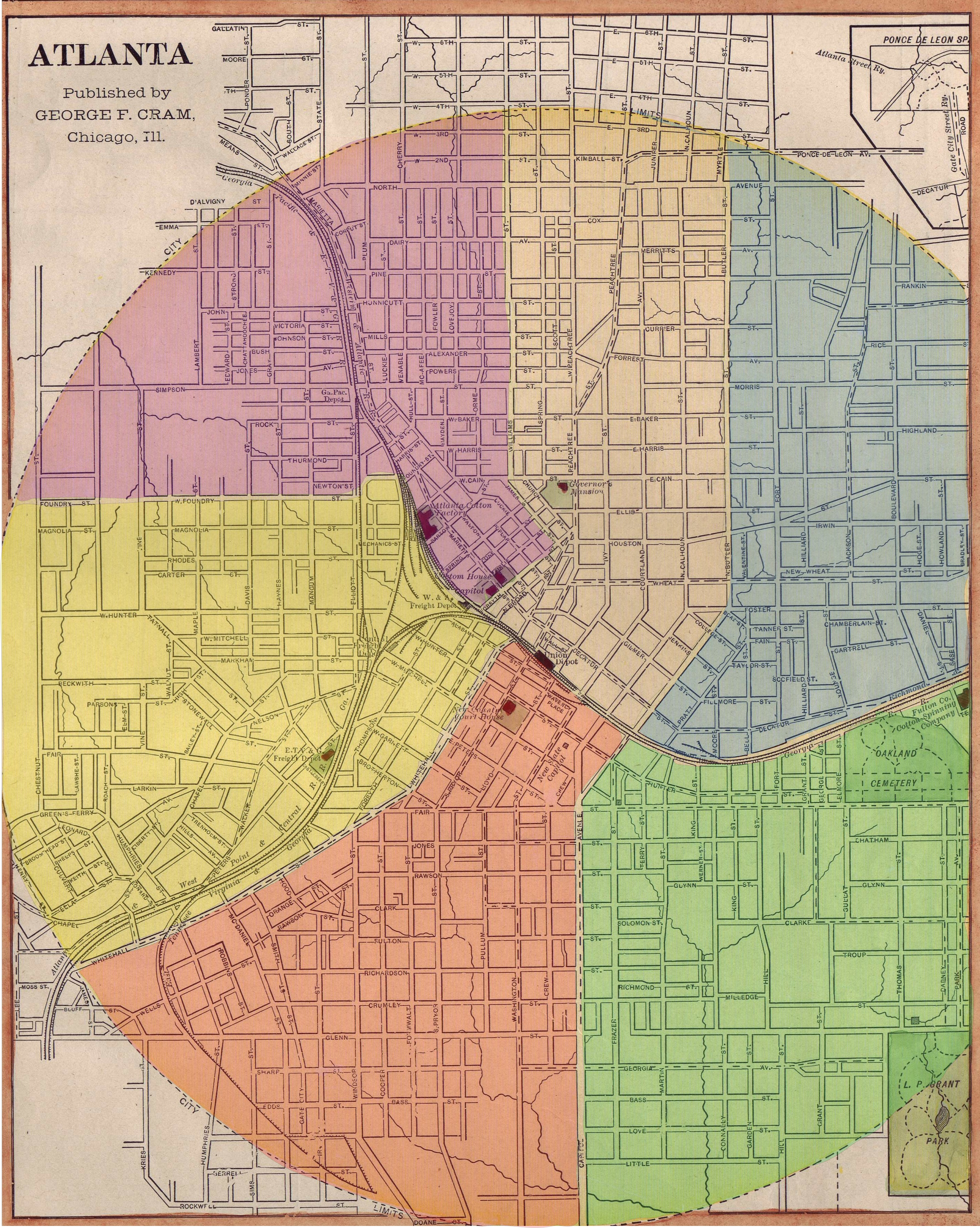
Fifth Ward in purple (1883 to 1894)

On November 5, 1883 a Sixth Ward (beige) was carved out of the Fourth and Fifth Wards. In later years wards were added or modified to handle newly annexed parts of the city but the Fifth remained essentially unchanged. The city converted to a district system in 1954.

=== 1935 ===
==== Aldermen ====
- Dowse B. Donaldson

==== Councilmembers ====
- O. B. Cawthorn
- John A. White

=== 1954 ===
- George Cotsakis (Post 1)

== List of councilmembers (1974–present) ==
- Morris Finley (1974–1985)
- Hosea Williams (1985–1989)
- Davetta Johnson Mitchell (1989–1995)
- Sherry Dorsey (1995–2002)
- Natalyn Mosby Archibong (2002–2022)
- Liliana Bakhtiari (2022–present)

== See also ==
- Atlanta ward system
