= Hemphill Avenue =

Neighborhood of Atlanta, Georgia, United States

Coordinates: 33.778°N 84.404°W

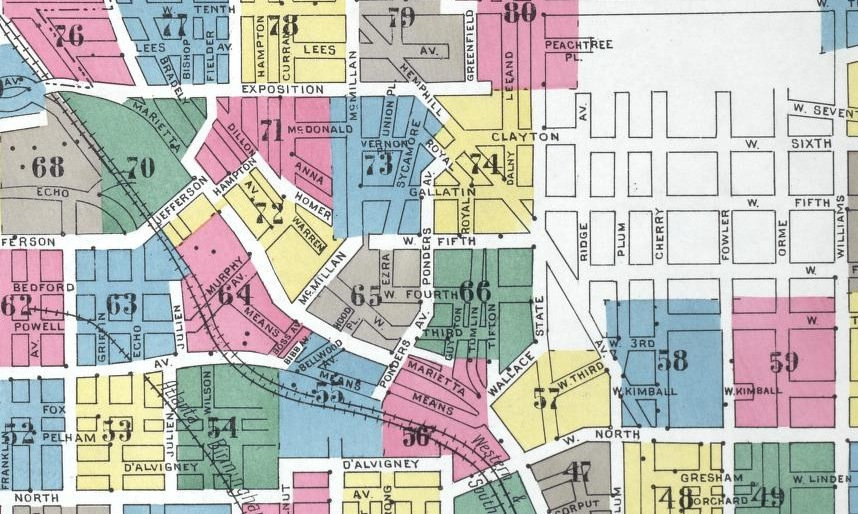
1911 map showing the Hemphill Avenue neighborhood

The Hemphill Avenue neighborhood was until the late 1960s a multi-racial working-class neighborhood of Atlanta, Georgia roughly bounded by 10th Street, Hemphill Avenue, North Avenue and Marietta Street. It contained homes, churches (including Ponders Street Baptist) and schools including the State Street school and J. Allen Couch Elementary School. The Couch School, located at 840 McMillan Street, is now called the Couch Building and houses Georgia Tech's School of Music and Center for Music Technology, both included in the College of Design).

A 1965 plan to expand Georgia Tech into the neighborhood signaled the beginning of the neighborhood's evacuation over the following years, in most cases by buying the homeowners out. Hemphill itself was a major city thoroughfare connecting Buckhead, the Atlantic Steel Mill, Techwood Homes and Downtown.
