= Slabtown (Atlanta) =

Neighborhood in Atlanta, Georgia, United States

Coordinates: 33°45′7.15″N 84°22′53.59″W

Slabtown or Slab Town was a red-light district that developed in Atlanta in the 1840s. The neighborhood, which was the site of a railway terminus, was located off present-day Decatur Street. The area's structures were built by poor workers and settlers, largely with slabs and leftover lumber from pioneer Jonathan Norcross' sawmill. As the railway terminus grew, the area became associated with brothels, saloons, and gambling.

In the 20th century, Grady Memorial Hospital was developed at the site. (Note: Garrett, Vol I)

== History ==
Dubbed the "Father of Atlanta" and "hard fighter of everything," Jonathan Norcross was a pioneer in the railroad town.

Following Indian removal in the 1830s, in 1844 Norcross moved to northern Georgia, where he became a successful dry goods merchant and sawmill operator. His sawmill produced mainly railroad ties and string timbers for the assembly of the Georgia Railroad, which had a terminus at Atlanta. Reclaiming timber and debris discarded by the sawmill, poor settlers quickly began building crude shanties for their families.

=== Rise and fall ===
In 1845, pioneer life could be characterized as desolate and distinct with simple pleasures. The numerous male railroad workers in Atlanta sought rough trade. About 15 years before the American Civil War, this was a time of ill repute for Atlanta; the railroad town was known for vice and political corruption. A collection of huts, shacks, brothels, and saloons began developing in the settlement. It grew alongside the similar nearby developments of Snake Nation and Murrell's Row.

Norcross commented, "the reason why the streets are so crooked, is that every man built on his land just to suit himself."

In 1851, there was an election for the Mayor of Atlanta. The Free and Rowdy Party ("rowdies") which represented the "toughs" of Slabtown, Murrell's Row, and Snake Nation, nominated lawyer and former city councilman L. C. Simpson. (Note: Martin, p.89) The Moral Party nominated Jonathan Norcross. (Note: Martin, p.89) Norcross won the election, becoming the fourth mayor of Atlanta. Soon Norcross, who was now in charge of the police court, made a point of sending rowdies to the city's new jail. After some rowdies threatened the mayor with a cannon, Norcross met with the city council for a secret emergency meeting and began deputizing people loyal to the Moral Party, who that evening were armed and stationed at Norcross' store and in various areas around the city. The rowdies also formed an armed militia, but did not attempt to fire the cannon. Then, at midnight, several squads of the deputized force cleared much of Slabtown and arrested Free and Rowdy Party leaders, who were tried and jailed the next day. (Note: Martin, pp. 91–93) However, Slabtown was not cleared permanently at this time, and was quickly rebuilt.

In 1902, an informal militia in disguise, known as White Caps, attacked Slab Town and Snake Nation in the night. (Note: Martin, pp. 93–94) They whipped the men and hauled the women to Decatur in wagons, warning all of them to leave town. (Note: Martin, pp. 93–94) They also burned down the shanties, and the area was abandoned.

=== 21st-century art and Slabtown ===
In early February 2010, Atlanta Beltline, Inc. (ABI) and Atlanta's Office of Cultural Affairs developed a project Art on the Beltline: Atlanta's New Public Place as part of redevelopment of the former industrial areas around the city. They sequenced visual and performance art installations, as well as historic site interpretations, at different points along the Atlanta Beltline to draw the public. A sculptural homage of the City's historic Slabtown was assembled by the contemporary art collective THE STATUS FACTION. Located on Irwin Street at the Beltline, the Slab Town installation resembles the "slab-style residences" which were destroyed and abandoned in 1902.
