= Midwest Cascade =

Neighborhood of Atlanta, Georgia

Coordinates: 33.728°N 84.539°W

Midwest Cascade, also known as West Cascade, is an affluent predominantly African-American neighborhood in southwest Atlanta at the city's far west edge. Together with the tiny neighborhood of Regency Trace, it forms NPU-Q, the city's fastest growing Neighborhood Planning Unit (NPU) from 2000 to 2010.

== Location ==
The neighborhood is 602.1 acres (2.437 km^{2}) large and bounded by the City of South Fulton on all sides, except for the City of Atlanta's NPU-P, bordering the Ashley Courts and Niskey Lake neighborhoods on the southeast. It includes the following named subdivisions:

- Barrow / Niskey Lake Circle
- Cascade Knolls (Cascade Knolls Drive SW)
- Cascade Pointe
- Elysian Estates (half)
- Guilford Forest
- Oasis of Cascade
- Putters Village (half)
- Regency Park
- Reunion Place at Cascade

Midwest Cascade is located south of Cascade Road, along Regency Center Drive.

== Annexation ==
The Atlanta City Council voted to annex Midwest Cascade to the City of Atlanta on September 29, 2006.

== Demographics ==
NPU-Q went from 1,024 residents in 2000 to 1,770 in 2010, an increase of 72.9%.

The NPU is 96.5% Black (2010 census), the highest proportion of any NPU in the city. Small minorities include Whites (1.4%) and Hispanics (1.4%).

== Parks ==
As of December 15, 2023, Midwest Cascade is home to the new West Cascade Park located on Danforth Road. The neighborhood's NPU was the last one to officially receive a park.

== Education ==
Atlanta Public Schools serves Midwest Cascade.

=== Public schools ===
- R. N. Fickett Elementary School
- Ralph J. Bunche Middle School
- Daniel McLaughlin Therrell High School

=== Public libraries ===
- The Atlanta–Fulton Public Library System operates the Cascade Branch in the City of South Fulton.

== Transportation ==
Midwest Cascade is located west of I-285, south of I-20 and Fulton Industrial Boulevard, and north of GA-166 (Campbellton Road SW). It is served by MARTA buses riding along its main roads: Cascade Road, Danforth Road, and New Hope Road.

== Notable people ==
Notable current and former residents of Midwest Cascade include:

- Former Atlanta mayor Keisha Lance Bottoms
