= Greenbriar, Atlanta =

Neighborhood of Atlanta, Georgia, United States

Coordinates: 33.682181°N 84.493664°W

Greenbriar is a neighborhood of southwestern Atlanta, Georgia. Greenbriar is a long strip along the east side of the Perimeter (I-285) stretching from Langford Parkway to just south of Stone Road. It is bordered by Atlanta's "Southwest" neighborhood across Langford Parkway to the north, Ben Hill Forest across the Perimeter to the west, and by the city of East Point on the east and south.

Greenbriar is part of neighborhood planning unit "R". Greenbriar Mall is located in the neighborhood.

== Demographics ==
Greenbriar's zip code 30331 was more than 95% African American at the 2000 census. The median household income of $41,353 was slightly below the Atlanta average of $49,981.

== Notable companies ==
In 2008, Tyler Perry opened Tyler Perry Studios on a 30-acre (120,000 m^{2}) site 0.5 miles (0.80 km) away from the mall on Greenbriar Parkway.

In addition, several recording studios call the area home: including Stack Em Entertainment, Hood South Studios, and Dirty Music.
