= James S. Boynton =

American politician and jurist (1833–1902)

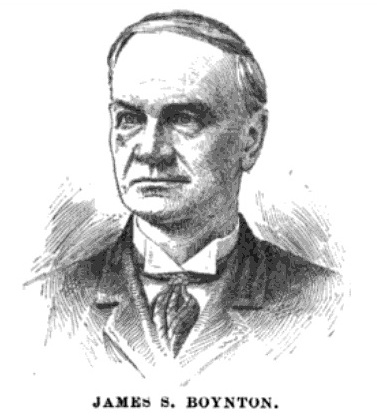

51st Governor of Georgia
- In office March 4, 1883 – May 10, 1883
- Preceded by: Alexander H. Stephens
- Succeeded by: Henry D. McDaniel

Personal details
- Born: James Stoddard Boynton; May 7, 1833 Henry County, Georgia, U.S.
- Died: December 22, 1902 (aged 69) Griffin, Georgia, U.S.
- Resting place: Oak Hill Cemetery
- Military career
- Allegiance: Confederate States of America
- Branch: Confederate States Army
- Rank: Colonel
- Unit: 30th Georgia Infantry
- Conflicts: American Civil War; Battle of Atlanta

James Stoddard Boynton (May 7, 1833 – December 22, 1902) was an American politician and jurist.

== Early life and education ==
Boynton was born in Henry County, Georgia on May 7, 1833. His parents were of modest wealth. His father, Elijah S. Boynton, was born in Vermont and came to Georgia as a young man. His mother, Elizabeth (Moffet) Boynton, was from a South Carolina family of French ancestry.

James S. Boynton was raised on his parents' farm in Henry County, GA, which was worked with the labor of enslaved African American people. James was educated in the local country schools which convened a few months of the year after the harvest. As a youth, he was inspired by tales of military exploits in the Mexican-American War. At the age of 16, he entered preparatory school with the ambition of seeking an appointment to the United States Military Academy at West Point. When his father died in 1849, he inherited 100 acres of land and one enslaved person. Still intent on attending West Point, he chose a guardian with means and willingness to assist him. But when this guardian died in 1851, he was forced to revise his plans and seek attendance at the Georgia Military Institute at Marietta, GA. With his second guardian's consent, he sold his land to cover the cost of attendance. But finding the money would be insufficient to sustain him through graduation, so he gave up his ambition of a military career. Instead, he moved to Cave Spring, GA to attend Hearn Manual Labor School, where he remained until his funds were exhausted.

== Legal career ==
Having exhausted his resources, Boynton returned to McDonough, Georgia where he accepted an offer to study law under Col. Leonard Thompson Doyal, then one of the most distinguished attorneys in Henry County, GA. After just seven weeks of study, his mastery of law was sufficient that he was admitted to the bar at the October 1852 term of the Superior Court of Henry County, Judge James H. Stark presiding.

Boynton opened a law office in Monticello, Jasper County, GA on November 15, 1852. He was 19 years of age. After six years of successful practice in Jasper County, Boynton relocated to Jackson, Georgia in Butts County where he entered into a successful law partnership with Col. James R. Lyons.

In 1860, Boynton was elected Ordinary of Butts County, Georgia. He was opposed to secession and, as an elected official, could have claimed an exemption from military service during the Civil War. However, he enlisted in the Confederate States Army and served until he was wounded in 1864.

In 1863, Boynton moved his family to Griffin, Georgia, where, after the war, he resumed the practice of law. In 1866, he was elected county judge and presided until the court was abolished during Reconstruction. He served three years as mayor of Griffin, and his law practice flourished. He served in elected offices from 1880 to 1893, when he returned to the practice of law. He served as division counsel for the Central Railroad of Georgia.

== Civil War ==
Boynton fought in the Civil War, serving as a private with the 30th Georgia Infantry. He was wounded in the Battle of Atlanta, and achieved the rank of colonel by the end of the war. After the war, Boynton returned to Griffin in 1865.

== Political career ==
Boynton briefly served as the 51st governor of Georgia from 1883 after the death of Governor Alexander Stephens. At the time of Stephens' death, Boynton was serving as the president of the Georgia Senate so he assumed the governorship. His additional political service included serving as Mayor of Griffin, Georgia.

Boynton also served as a judge in the Spalding County, Georgia Court and the Flint Circuit Superior Court.

== Death and legacy ==
He died at his home in Griffin in 1902 and was buried in Oak Hill Cemetery in that same city.

A street in Chickamauga, Georgia is named for him.

Political offices
Preceded by Alexander Stephens	Governor of Georgia; 1883	Succeeded by Henry Dickerson McDaniel
