= List of tallest buildings in Atlanta =

Skyline of Atlanta
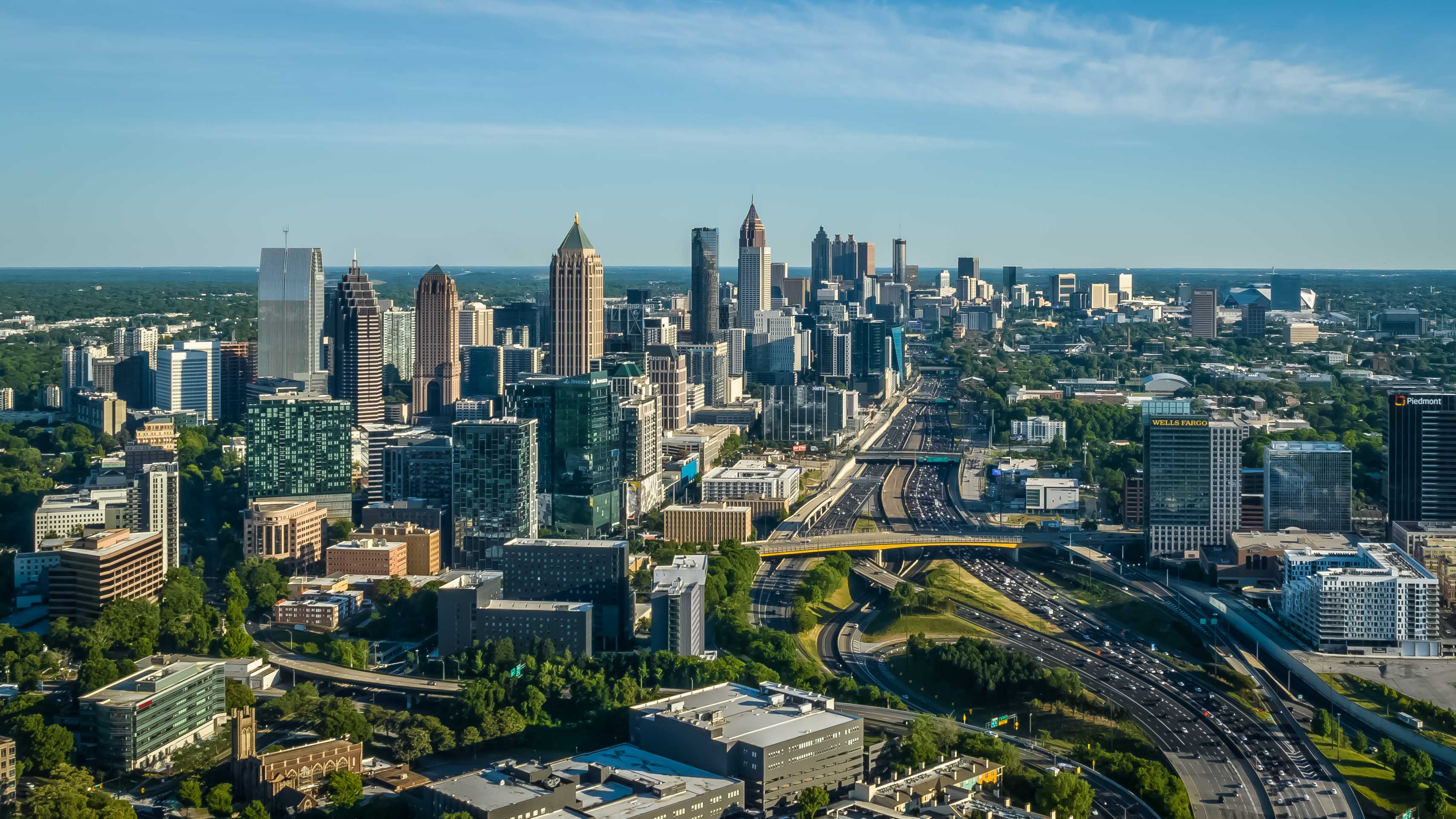
- Midtown and Downtown Atlanta 2026
- Tallest building: Bank of America Plaza (1992)
- Tallest building height: 1,023 ft (311.8 m)
- Major clusters: Downtown Atlanta; Midtown Atlanta; Buckhead
- First 150 m+ building: State of Georgia Building (1967)

Number of tall buildings (2026)
- Taller than 100 m (328 ft): 98
- Taller than 150 m (492 ft): 18
- Taller than 200 m (656 ft): 11
- Taller than 300 m (984 ft): 1

Number of tall buildings — feet
- Taller than 300 ft (91.4 m): 125

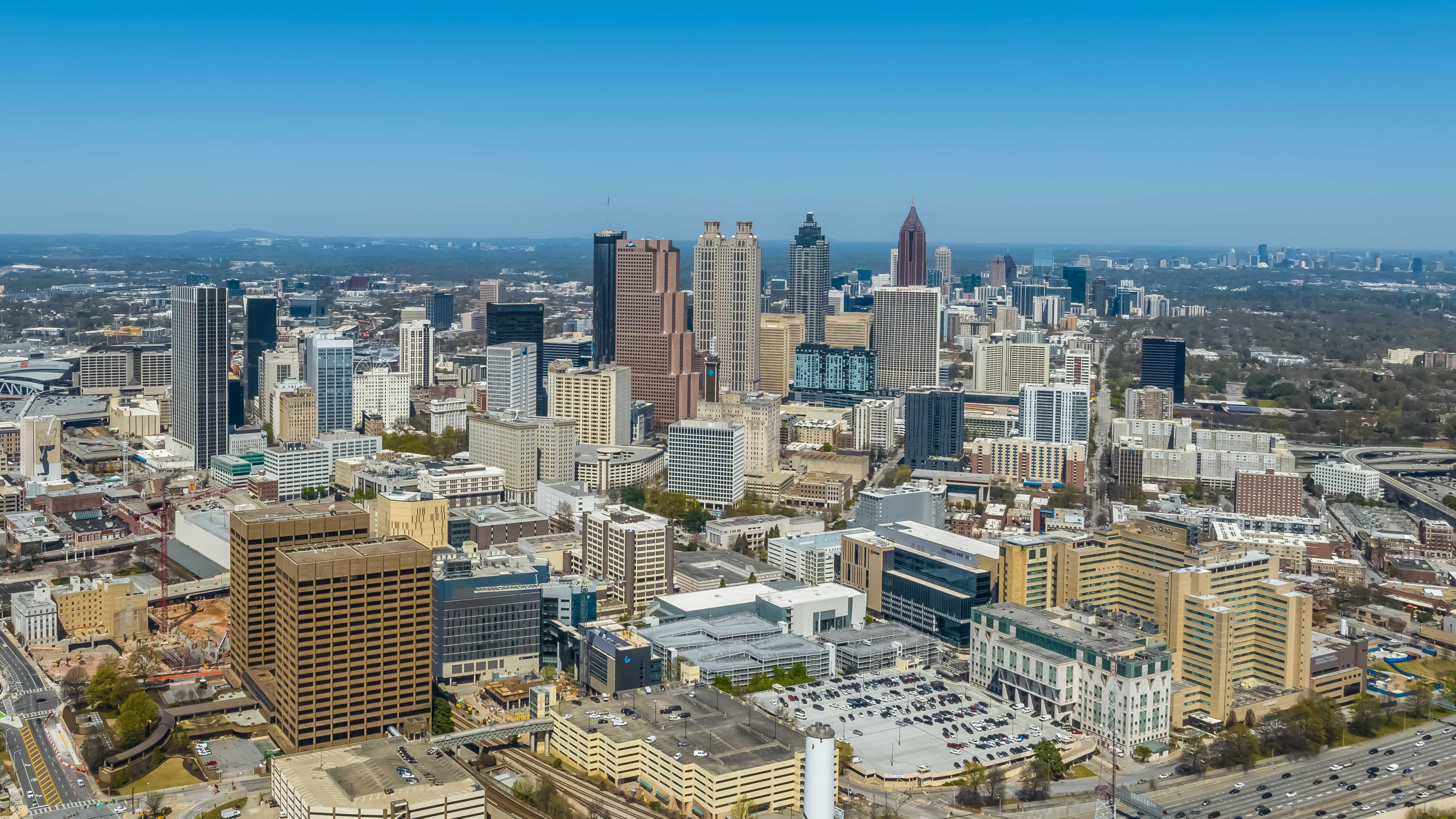
An aerial view of Downtown Atlanta in 2025, with Midtown and Buckhead in the background

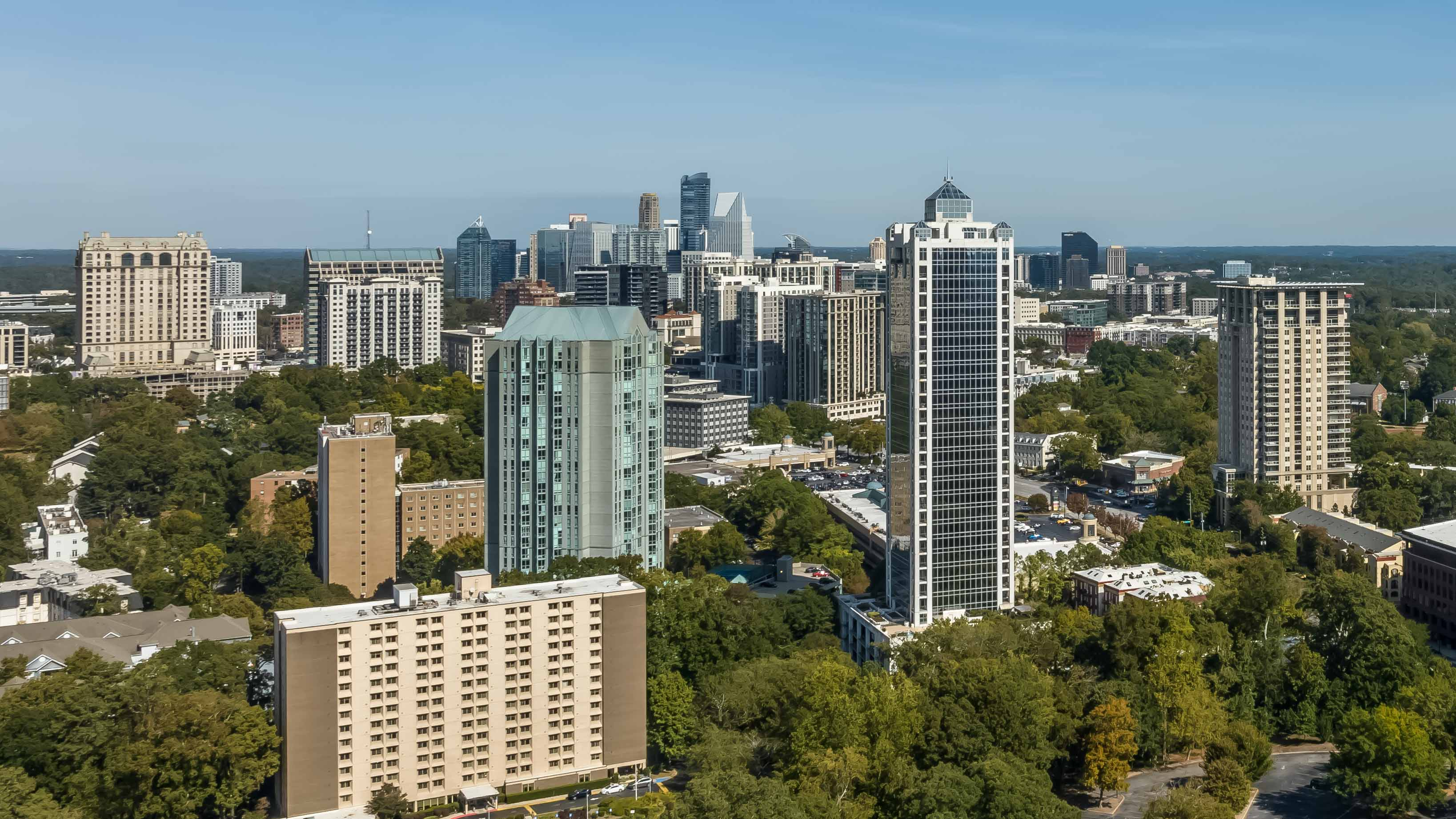
Buckhead in 2025

Atlanta is the capital and largest city of the U.S. state of Georgia, with a metropolitan area of 6.4 million. As of 2026, Atlanta is home to 125 high-rise buildings over 300 feet (91 m) tall, and has the fifth most in the United States after New York City, Chicago, Miami, and Houston. 18 of these buildings are skyscrapers taller than 492 ft (150 m). Atlanta's skyline is the second largest in the Southern United States, after Miami. The tallest building in the city is the Bank of America Plaza between Downtown and Midtown Atlanta, the city's only supertall skyscraper. It was completed in 1992 at a height of 1,023 ft (312 m). Of the 20 tallest buildings in Georgia, 18 are located in Atlanta; the other two, Concourse Corporate Center V & VI, are in the neighboring city of Sandy Springs.

Early high-rises in Atlanta include the Flatiron Building, completed in 1897, five years before New York City's building of the same name; the Candler Building; and the romanesque Rhodes–Haverty Building. However, Atlanta's skyline remained short until the 1960s, with the topping out of One Park Tower. Atlanta's building boom accelerated in the 1980s, culminating in the completion of three of the city's four tallest buildings in 1992. Initially, skyscraper development in Atlanta occurred largely in Downtown. Midtown Atlanta would see increased development from the 1980s onwards.

In the early 21st century, high-rise development has continued to shift towards Midtown. The Atlantic Station project resulted in a new mixed-use high-rise neighborhood in the northwest of Midtown. This period also saw significant development in central Buckhead, including the addition of its tallest building, 3344 Peachtree, in 2008. Following a period of little high-rise construction after the Great Recession, Atlanta underwent another building boom beginning in the mid-2010s. Development mainly occurred in Midtown, where many residential towers have been built upon surface parking lots. Between 2000 and 2023, Atlanta more than doubled its number of buildings taller than 300 ft (91 m) from 55 to 115.

Unlike many American cities where the tallest buildings are concentrated in a single area, Atlanta's skyscrapers are primarily found in three neighborhoods: Downtown Atlanta, Midtown Atlanta, and Buckhead. They form a skyline that mainly runs northwards from Downtown Atlanta to Buckhead, centered around Peachtree Street, a major thoroughfare. In Midtown, the skyline is bounded to the west by Interstate-85. Between Midtown and central Buckhead, shorter high-rises line both sides of Peachtree Street. Since the 2010s, new developments have formed small clusters of high-rises in West Midtown and Old Fourth Ward. In Metro Atlanta, the cities of Dunwoody, Sandy Springs, and Brookhaven form the northern business district of Perimeter Center, which contains a substantial number of office towers. To a lesser extent, commercial high-rises can also be found in Cumberland and Vinings; high-rises are rare in the rest of the metropolitan area, which mostly consists of single-family homes.

== History ==
Number of buildings by height in Atlanta by the end of each year. Click on the legend to toggle a specific height on or off. View chart definition.

The history of skyscrapers in Atlanta began with the completion in of the eight-story Equitable Building in 1892. Early high-rises include the Flatiron Building, completed in 1897, five years before New York City's building of the same name; the Candler Building; and the romanesque Rhodes–Haverty Building. However, Atlanta's skyline remained under 300 ft (91 m) until the 1960s, with the topping out of One Park Tower. The following two decades would see the construction of increasingly tall office skyscrapers, despite the city losing over 100,000 residents during this time. Atlanta's building boom accelerated in the 1980s, culminating in the completion of the city's three of the city's four tallest buildings in 1992. These were Truist Plaza, Atlanta's second-tallest building; 191 Peachtree Tower, Atlanta's fourth-tallest; and Bank of America Plaza. Initially, skyscraper development in Atlanta occurred largely in Downtown. Midtown Atlanta received its first major high-rise development, Colony Square, in 1973, and would see further development in the 1980s. One Atlantic Center, the city's third-tallest building, was completed in 1987.

Skyscraper construction slowed considerably in the mid-1990s, but resumed in the 2000s, as the city's population and economy rebounded. High-rise development shifted increasingly towards Midtown, which was undergoing a transformation into a high-density residential area; the Atlantic Station project resulted in a new mixed-use high-rise neighborhood in the northwest of Midtown, across the I-85. The decade also saw significant development in central Buckhead, including the addition of its tallest building, 3344 Peachtree, in 2008. While the Great Recession paused construction again in the early 2010s, Midtown remained a target for high-rise development. Large number of parking lots have been replaced by residential towers. In 2023, construction began on 1072 West Peachtree Street, planned to reach a height of 749 ft (228.3 m); when completed in 2026, it will be Atlanta's tallest new building in over 30 years. In Downtown, the Centennial Yards development broke ground in 2024; the project, which includes multiple towers, aims to transform the site of a former railyard into a new mixed-use district.

Several of the downtown buildings were damaged in a major tornado in March 2008, scattering glass from several hundred feet. It took workers several days to clean the buildings and remove all of the loose shards of glass from the skyscrapers. No structural damage was reported, and by late 2010 each skyscraper had all of its windows replaced. Window blinds and other office objects from the tall buildings were found as far away as Oakland Cemetery.

== Cityscape ==
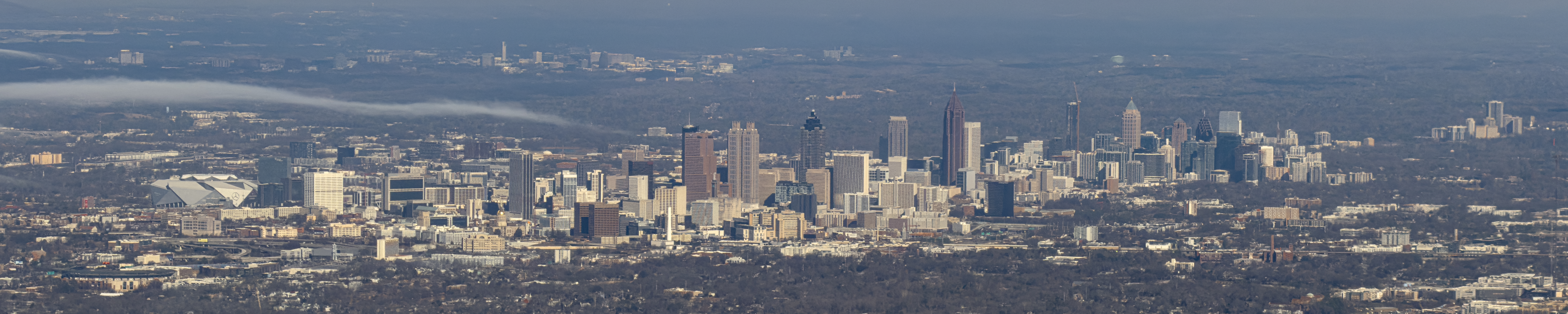
Aerial view of the Atlanta skyline in 2026. Downtown and Midtown are visible in the center, with Cumberland in the background.

== Map of tallest buildings ==
=== Downtown and Midtown Atlanta ===
The map below shows the location of buildings taller than 300 feet (91 m) in both Downtown Atlanta, and Midtown Atlanta directly to its north. Each marker is numbered by rank and colored by the decade of the building's completion.

Buildings taller than 300 ft (91 m) in Downtown and Midtown Atlanta.
- 1960s
- 1970s
- 1980s
- 1990s
- 2000s
- 2010s
- 2020s
1 Bank of America Plaza
2 Truist Plaza
3 One Atlantic Center
4 191 Peachtree Tower
5 1072 West Peachtree Street
6 Westin Peachtree Plaza Hotel
7 Georgia Pacific Tower
8 Promenade II
9 Tower Square
11 1180 Peachtree
12 GLG Grand-Four Seasons
14 The Atlantic
15 State of Georgia Building
16 Atlanta Marriott Marquis
17 The Hue Midtown
18 ViewPoint
19 TWELVE Centennial Park Tower I
20 1075 Peachtree Office Tower
25 Signia Hilton Atlanta
26 101 Marietta Street
27 Equitable Building
28 Spire
30 One Park Tower
31 1105 West Peachtree
32 1100 Peachtree
37 Momentum Midtown
39 1280 West
40 1010 Midtown
41 Peachtree Summit
42 One Coca-Cola Plaza
44 1081 Juniper I
45 1020 Spring
46 Kinetic
47 999 Peachtree
48 Mayfair Renaissance
49 171 17th Street
50 Coda at Tech Square
51 Sam Nunn Atlanta Federal Center
52 Loews Midtown
54 Atlanta Hilton Hotel
55 Richard B. Russell Federal Building
56 230 Peachtree Building
57 Harris Tower
58 Southern Bell Telephone Company Building
59 1081 Juniper II
60 Marquis I
61 Marquis II
62 25 Park Place
63 Coastal States Insurance Building
64 Peachtree Center International Tower
65 BB&T Tower
66 Midtown Union Office Building
68 One Georgia Center
69 Mayfair Tower Condominiums
71 The Campanile
72 Regions Plaza
74 Society Atlanta
75 Atlantic House
76 The Legacy at Centennial
78 Nomia
79 903 Peachtree
80 Emmi Midtown
82 Hanover Midtown
83 Sora at Spring Quarter
84 The Proscenium
86 Hyatt Regency Atlanta
88 Twelve Atlantic Station
89 The Connector
91 Peachtree Center South
92 Georgia Power Company Headquarters
95 Peachtree Center North
96 W Downtown Atlanta Hotel & Residences
97 The Dagny Midtown
98 Modera Midtown
99 Ascent Peachtree
100 Mira at Midtown Union
101 NCR Global Headquarters
102 Colony Square 100
103 Crown Plaza & Staybridge Suites Atlanta Midtown
104 Modera Parkside
105 Norfolk Southern Headquarters
107 The Mark at Atlanta
108 Anthem Technology Center
109 712 West Peachtree
110 The Starling
111 Omni Atlanta Hotel at Centennial Park
112 Museum Tower at Centennial Hill
113 Colony Square 400
115 Vireo
117 Ascent Midtown
118 MAA Midtown
119 270 Peachtree
121 Atltitude Apartments
122 AMLI Arts Center
123 Square on Fifth
124 Merchandise Mart
125 Coca-Cola USA Building

=== Buckhead ===
The map below shows the location of buildings taller than 300 feet (91 m) in Buckhead, located north and northeast of Midtown Atlanta.

Buildings taller than 300 ft (91 m) in Buckhead.
- 1970s
- 1980s
- 1990s
- 2000s
- 2010s
- 2020s
10 3344 Peachtree
13 Waldorf Astoria Atlanta Buckhead
21 Park Avenue Condominiums
22 Terminus 100
23 The Paramount at Buckhead
24 The Ritz-Carlton Residences
29 Buckhead Grand
33 Atlanta Plaza 1
34 Park Place
35 Elora at Buckhead
36 2828 Peachtree
38 Two Alliance Center
43 Tower Place 100
53 Monarch Tower
67 Realm
70 Terminus 200
73 10 Terminus Place
77 Resurgens Plaza
81 Three Alliance Center
85 The Oaks at Buckhead
87 The Pinnacle
90 The Grandview
93 Gallery
94 The St. Regis Atlanta
106 Phipps Tower
114 One Alliance Center
116 The Concorde
120 The Huntley Buckhead

== Tallest buildings ==
This list ranks Atlanta skyscrapers that stand at least 300 feet (91 m) tall as of 2026, based on standard height measurement. This includes spires and architectural details but does not include antenna masts. The "Year" column indicates the year in which a building was completed. Buildings tied in height are sorted by year of completion, and then alphabetically.

Was the tallest building in Atlanta upon completion
Architecturally topped out but not yet completed

Rank	Name	Image	Location	Height ft (m)	Floors	Year	Purpose	Notes
1	Bank of America Plaza		Downtown 33°46′15″N 84°23′10″W	1,023 (311.8)	55	1992	Office	25th-tallest in the United States (8th at completion); tallest building in Georgia; tallest in the Southeastern United States. Tallest building constructed in the United States in the 1990s. Formerly the tallest building in any U.S. state capital until 2026, when it was surpassed by Waterline in Austin.
2	Truist Plaza		Downtown 33°45′46″N 84°23′12″W	867 (264.3)	60	1992	Office	2nd-tallest building in Georgia. If the antenna spire is included, Truist Plaza's height increases to 902 ft (275 m).
3	One Atlantic Center		Midtown 33°47′13″N 84°23′15″W	820 (249.9)	50	1987	Office	3rd-tallest building in Georgia. Tallest building in Midtown Atlanta. Tallest building completed in Atlanta in the 1980s.
4	191 Peachtree Tower		Downtown 33°45′32″N 84°23′12″W	770 (234.7)	50	1992	Office	4th-tallest building in Georgia.
5	1072 West Peachtree Street		Midtown 33°47′03″N 84°23′18″W	749 (228.3)	61	2026	Mixed-use	Mixed-use residential and office building. Topped out in November 2025 and completed in early 2026. Tallest building completed in Atlanta in the 2020s.
6	Westin Peachtree Plaza Hotel		Downtown 33°45′34″N 84°23′19″W	723 (220.4)	73	1976	Hotel	5th-tallest building in Georgia. Tallest building completed in Atlanta in the 1970s. Tallest hotel in Atlanta. Tallest hotel in the world from 1976 to 1977
7	Georgia Pacific Tower		Downtown 33°45′27″N 84°23′14″W	697 (212.5)	51	1981	Office	6th-tallest building in Georgia.
8	Promenade II		Midtown 33°47′16″N 84°23′07″W	691 (210.6)	40	1989	Office	7th-tallest building in Georgia.
9	Tower Square		Midtown 33°46′22″N 84°23′12″W	677 (206.4)	47	1980	Office	8th-tallest building in Georgia.
10	3344 Peachtree		Buckhead 33°50′50″N 84°22′07″W	665 (202.7)	48	2008	Mixed-use	9th-tallest building in Georgia. Tallest building in Buckhead. Tallest building completed in Atlanta in the 2000s. Mixed-use office and residential building. Also known by its residential portion, Sovereign.
11	1180 Peachtree		Midtown 33°47′13″N 84°23′02″W	657 (200.2)	41	2006	Office	10th-tallest building in Georgia. Also known as the Symphony Tower.
12	GLG Grand-Four Seasons		Midtown 33°47′11″N 84°23′07″W	609 (185.6)	53	1992	Mixed-use	11th-tallest in Georgia. Mixed-use residential and hotel building.
13	Waldorf Astoria Atlanta Buckhead		Buckhead 33°50′58″N 84°22′00″W	580 (176.8)	42	2008	Mixed-use	12th-tallest in Georgia. Previously named The Mandarin Oriental, Atlanta, and initially constructed as The Mansion on Peachtree. Mixed-use residential and hotel building.
14	The Atlantic		Midtown 33°47′27″N 84°23′51″W	577 (175.9)	46	2009	Residential	13th-tallest in Georgia. Tallest all-residential building in Atlanta. Tallest building in the Atlantic Station neighborhood.
15	State of Georgia Building		Downtown 33°45′15″N 84°23′26″W	556 (169.5)	44	1967	Office	Also known as the Two Peachtree Building or 2 Peachtree Street, and previously known as the First National Bank Building. Tallest building completed in Atlanta in the 1960s.
16	Atlanta Marriott Marquis		Downtown 33°45′41″N 84°23′05″W	554 (168.9)	52	1985	Hotel	Contains the largest Hotel Atrium in Georgia
17	The Hue Midtown		Midtown 33°47′10″N 84°23′17″W	515 (157)	39	2018	Residential	Tallest building completed in Atlanta in the 2010s. Also known as Icon Midtown.
18	ViewPoint		Midtown 33°46′40″N 84°23′02″W	501 (152.7)	36	2008	Residential	
19	TWELVE Centennial Park Tower I		Downtown 33°45′54″N 84°23′17″W	491 (149.7)	39	2007	Residential	
20	1075 Peachtree Office Tower		Midtown 33°47′02″N 84°22′58″W	488 (148.7)	38	2010	Office	Also known as the Midtown One Office Tower.
21	Park Avenue Condominiums		Buckhead 33°51′19″N 84°21′42″W	486 (148.1)	44	2000	Residential	
22	Terminus 100		Buckhead 33°50′39″N 84°22′17″W	485 (147.9)	26	2007	Office	
23	The Paramount at Buckhead		Buckhead 33°51′04″N 84°22′03″W	478 (145.7)	40	2004	Residential	
24	The Ritz-Carlton Residences		Buckhead 33°51′16″N 84°21′30″W	469 (143)	40	2010	Mixed-use	Also known as 3630 Peachtree Road. Mixed-use residential and office building.
25	Signia Hilton Atlanta		Downtown 33°45′31″N 84°24′03″W	463 (141)	40	2024	Hotel	
26	101 Marietta Street		Downtown 33°45′24″N 84°23′31″W	459 (140)	36	1976	Office	Formerly known as the Centennial Tower.
27	Equitable Building		Downtown 33°45′24″N 84°23′19″W	453 (138.1)	34	1967	Office	
28	Spire		Midtown 33°46′42″N 84°23′05″W	453 (138)	28	2005	Residential	
29	Buckhead Grand		Buckhead 33°50′56″N 84°22′15″W	451 (137.5)	38	2004	Residential	
30	One Park Tower		Downtown 33°45′17″N 84°23′22″W	439 (133.8)	32	1961	Office	Tallest building in Atlanta from 1961 to 1967.
31	1105 West Peachtree		Midtown 33°47′05″N 84°23′15″W	437 (133.2)	32	2021	Office	The shorter residential companion to this development is named 40 West 12th.
32	1100 Peachtree		Midtown 33°47′05″N 84°23′01″W	428 (130.5)	28	1990	Office	
33	Atlanta Plaza 1		Buckhead 33°50′48″N 84°21′26″W	425 (129.5)	32	1985	Office	
34	Park Place		Buckhead 33°49′39″N 84°23′17″W	420 (128)	40	1986	Residential	
35	Elora at Buckhead		Buckhead 33°50′55″N 84°22′01″W	420 (128)	35	2019	Residential	Also known as Icon Buckhead.
36	2828 Peachtree		Buckhead 33°49′59″N 84°23′07″W	420 (127.9)	33	2002	Residential	
37	Momentum Midtown		Midtown 33°46′58″N 84°23′17″W	419 (128)	36	2024	Residential	
38	Two Alliance Center		Buckhead 33°51′04″N 84°21′59″W	411 (125)	25	2009	Office	(Note: This building's height is listed as 395 ft according to the source, which excludes its architectural crown.)
39	1280 West		Midtown 33°47′20″N 84°23′17″W	410 (125)	38	1989	Residential	
40	1010 Midtown		Midtown 33°47′02″N 84°23′02″W	407 (124)	36	2009	Residential	
41	Peachtree Summit		Downtown 33°45′55″N 84°23′13″W	406 (123.8)	31	1975	Office	
42	One Coca-Cola Plaza		Downtown 33°46′15″N 84°23′47″W	403 (122.8)	29	1980	Office	
43	Tower Place 100		Buckhead 33°50′51″N 84°22′16″W	401 (122.2)	29	1974	Office	
44	1081 Juniper I		Midtown 33°47′03″N 84°22′55″W	400 (121.9)	36	2024	Residential	Also known as The Juniper.
45	1020 Spring		Midtown 33°46′58″N 84°23′25″W	400 (121.9)	25	2024	Office	Also written as Ten Twenty Spring.
46	Kinetic		Midtown 33°46′57″N 84°23′20″W	400 (121.9)	34	2024	Residential	
47	999 Peachtree		Midtown 33°46′52″N 84°23′01″W	396 (120.7)	28	1987	Office	Also known as Wachovia Plaza or First Union Plaza.
48	Mayfair Renaissance		Midtown 33°47′09″N 84°22′52″W	395 (120.4)	35	2002	Residential	
49	171 17th Street		Midtown 33°47′30″N 84°23′38″W	394 (120)	23	2004	Office	Also known as Atlantic Station Office Building One, Southtrust Tower, or Wachovia Atlantic Station
50	Coda at Tech Square		Midtown 33°46′32″N 84°23′16″W	390 (118.9)	21	2019	Office	
51	Sam Nunn Atlanta Federal Center		Downtown 33°45′14″N 84°23′38″W	388 (118.3)	24	1997	Office	
52	Loews Midtown		Midtown 33°47′00″N 84°23′00″W	388 (118.2)	39	2010	Mixed-use	Mixed-use residential and hotel building.
53	Monarch Tower		Buckhead 33°51′06″N 84°21′52″W	387 (118)	24	1997	Office	
54	Atlanta Hilton Hotel		Downtown 33°45′41″N 84°23′01″W	383 (116.7)	30	1974	Hotel	
55	Richard B. Russell Federal Building		Downtown 33°45′12″N 84°23′45″W	383 (116.7)	26	1978	Office	
56	230 Peachtree Building		Downtown 33°45′37″N 84°23′17″W	382 (116.4)	29	1965	Mixed-use	Also known as the Peachtree Center Tower. Mixed-use hotel and office building.
57	Harris Tower		Downtown 33°45′39″N 84°23′11″W	382 (116.4)	31	1975	Office	
58	Southern Bell Telephone Company Building		Downtown 33°45′21″N 84°23′08″W	380 (115.8)	14	1963	Office	Also known as the AT&T Communications Building. Originally completed in 1929 with six stories. Additions in 1947, 1948 and 1963 brought it to its present 14 stories.
59	1081 Juniper II		Midtown 33°47′01″N 84°22′55″W	380 (115.8)	33	2024	Residential	Also known as The Reserve at Juniper.
60	Marquis I		Downtown 33°45′40″N 84°23′08″W	378 (115.2)	30	1985	Office	
61	Marquis II		Downtown 33°45′43″N 84°23′08″W	378 (115.2)	30	1986	Office	
62	25 Park Place		Downtown 33°45′19″N 84°23′16″W	377 (114.9)	28	1971	Education	Tallest educational building in Atlanta. Formerly known as the Trust Company of Georgia Building and later the SunTrust Bank Building. Acquired by Georgia State University in 2007. Currently houses many departments in the College of Arts and Science.
63	Coastal States Insurance Building		Downtown 33°45′41″N 84°23′16″W	377 (114.9)	27	1971	Office	
64	Peachtree Center International Tower		Downtown 33°45′36″N 84°23′11″W	376 (114.6)	30	1972	Office	
65	BB&T Tower		Midtown 33°47′30″N 84°23′45″W	375 (114.3)	25	2009	Office	
66	Midtown Union Office Building		Midtown 33°47′29″N 84°23′19″W	374 (114) (Note: This height is an estimate by the CTBUH.)	26	2022	Office	
67	Realm		Buckhead 33°50′45″N 84°22′10″W	373 (113.7)	29	2006	Mixed-use	Mixed-use office and residential building.
68	One Georgia Center		Downtown 33°46′15″N 84°23′16″W	371 (113.1)	24	1968	Office	
69	Mayfair Tower Condominiums		Midtown 33°47′10″N 84°22′51″W	370 (112.8)	34	1990	Residential	
70	Terminus 200		Buckhead 33°50′46″N 84°22′19″W	370 (112.7)	25	2009	Office	
71	The Campanile	–	Midtown 33°47′10″N 84°22′57″W	367 (111.9)	20	1987	Office	
72	Regions Plaza		Midtown 33°47′13″N 84°23′18″W	367 (111.9)	24	2001	Office	Also known as Atlantic Center Plaza.
73	10 Terminus Place		Buckhead 33°50′43″N 84°22′18″W	360 (110)	32	2008	Residential	(Note: This building's height is listed as 411 ft according to the CTBUH. However, measurements on Google Earth indicate that the building is no more than 360 ft tall.)
74	Society Atlanta		Midtown 33°46′38″N 84°23′02″W	360 (109.7)	31	2024	Residential	
75	Atlantic House		Midtown 33°47′09″N 84°23′15″W	358 (109)	32	2016	Residential	
76	The Legacy at Centennial		Downtown 33°45′29″N 84°23′26″W	358 (109) (Note: Sources do not state the exact height of this building. This figure was determined using Google Earth by subtracting the altitude of the building's lowest main pedestrian open-air entrance from the highest architectural point.)	32	2023	Residential	
77	Resurgens Plaza		Buckhead 33°50′48″N 84°21′22″W	356 (108.5)	25	1988	Office	
78	Nomia		Midtown 33°47′32″N 84°23′13″W	355 (108)	32	2023	Residential	
79	903 Peachtree		Midtown 33°46′46″N 84°23′02″W	354 (108)	31	2022	Residential	
80	Emmi Midtown		Midtown 33°47′35″N 84°23′20″W	352 (107)	31	2024	Residential	
81	Three Alliance Center		Buckhead 33°51′07″N 84°22′02″W	351 (107)	29	2017	Office	
82	Hanover Midtown		Midtown 33°47′17″N 84°23′17″W	351 (107)	31	2023	Residential	Also known by its street address, 1230 West Peachtree.
83	Sora at Spring Quarter		Midtown 33°46′54″N 84°23′22″W	350 (107)	30	2023	Residential	1000 Spring St
84	The Proscenium		Midtown 33°47′11″N 84°23′01″W	344 (104.9)	24	2001	Office	
85	The Oaks at Buckhead		Buckhead 33°51′00″N 84°21′34″W	341 (104)	30	1991	Residential	
86	Hyatt Regency Atlanta		Downtown 33°45′41″N 84°23′12″W	340 (103.6)	24	1967	Hotel	
87	The Pinnacle		Buckhead 33°51′03″N 84°21′39″W	337 (102.7)	22	1998	Office	
88	Twelve Atlantic Station		Midtown 33°47′30″N 84°23′53″W	336 (102.4)	26	2005	Mixed-use	Mixed-use residential and hotel building.
89	The Connector		Midtown 33°46′25″N 84°23′18″W	336 (102)	27	2021	Residential	Located on 699 Spring Street.
90	The Grandview		Buckhead 33°50′57″N 84°21′26″W	335 (102)	36	1990	Residential	
91	Peachtree Center South		Downtown 33°45′36″N 84°23′13″W	332 (101.2)	27	1969	Office	
92	Georgia Power Company Headquarters		Downtown 33°45′48″N 84°22′53″W	332 (101) (Note: While sources state this building has a height of 299 ft, measurements on Google Earth indicate it is over 330 ft tall.)	24	1981	Office	Headquarters of Georgia Power.
93	Gallery		Buckhead 33°49′51″N 84°23′07″W	331 (101)	26	2007	Residential	
94	The St. Regis Atlanta		Buckhead 33°50′24″N 84°22′57″W	331 (101)	26	2009	Hotel	
95	Peachtree Center North		Downtown 33°45′38″N 84°23′13″W	331 (100.9)	27	1967	Office	
96	W Downtown Atlanta Hotel & Residences		Downtown 33°45′54″N 84°23′21″W	331 (100.9)	28	2009	Mixed-use	Mixed-use residential and hotel building
97	The Dagny Midtown		Midtown 33°46′43″N 84°23′00″W	330 (101)	29	2019	Residential	
98	Linea Midtown		Midtown 33°46′48″N 84°23′24″W	328 (100)	29	2017	Residential	
99	Ascent Peachtree		Downtown 33°45′34″N 84°23′07″W	325 (99)	29	2020	Residential	
100	Mira at Midtown Union		Midtown 33°47′25″N 84°23′21″W	323 (98)	26	2022	Residential	
101	NCR Global Headquarters		Midtown 33°46′45″N 84°23′24″W	318 (97)	21	2018	Office	Headquarters of NCR Voyix.
102	Colony Square 100		Midtown 33°47′13″N 84°22′58″W	315 (96)	24	1969	Office	
103	Crown Plaza & Staybridge Suites Atlanta Midtown		Downtown 33°46′13″N 84°23′18″W	315 (96)	25	1972	Hotel	Previously known as Penta Hotel, Stouffer's Atlanta Inn, and Renaissance Atlanta Downtown.
104	Modera Parkside		Midtown 33°46′56″N 84°22′53″W	315 (96)	32	2025	Residential	
105	Norfolk Southern Headquarters		Midtown 33°46′22″N 84°23′18″W	315 (96)	17	2021	Office	
106	Phipps Tower		Buckhead 33°51′10″N 84°21′51″W	315 (96) (Note: Sources do not state the exact height of this building, which is on a slope. This figure was determined using Google Earth by subtracting the altitude of the building's lowest point at ground from its highest architectural point.)	20	2010	Office	
107	The Mark at Atlanta		Midtown 33°46′52″N 84°23′19″W	315 (96)	28	2020	Residential	
108	Anthem Technology Center I		Midtown 33°46′29″N 84°23′16″W	313 (95.4)	21	2020	Office	
109	712 West Peachtree		Midtown 33°46′27″N 84°23′16″W	312 (95)	21	2021	Office	
110	The Starling		Midtown 33°47′13″N 84°22′54″W	310 (94.5)	28	1974	Hotel	Formerly known as W Atlanta-Midtown.
111	Omni Atlanta Hotel at Centennial Park		Downtown 33°45′32″N 84°23′42″W	309 (94.3)	28	2003	Hotel	
112	Museum Tower at Centennial Hill		Downtown 33°45′45″N 84°23′30″W	308 (94)	24	2002	Residential	Home to the Children's Museum of Atlanta.
113	Colony Square 400		Midtown 33°47′15″N 84°22′59″W	308 (93.9)	22	1973	Office	
114	One Alliance Center		Buckhead 33°51′08″N 84°21′59″W	307 (94)	22	2001	Office	
115	Vireo		Midtown 33°47′07″N 84°22′51″W	307 (94)	27	2019	Residential	
116	The Concorde		Buckhead 33°50′02″N 84°23′09″W	307 (93.5)	31	1987	Residential	
117	Ascent Midtown		Midtown 33°47′34″N 84°23′17″W	304 (93)	28	2019	Residential	
118	MAA Midtown		Midtown 33°46′58″N 84°23′12″W	304 (93)	25	2017	Residential	Formerly known as Post Midtown.
119	270 Peachtree		Downtown 33°45′43″N 84°23′17″W	302 (92)	22	1961	Office	Formerly known as the Southern Company Building. Current headquarters of the American Cancer Society.
120	The Huntley Buckhead		Buckhead 33°51′18″N 84°21′46″W	302 (92)	27	2018	Residential	
121	Altitude Apartments		Downtown 33°45′41″N 84°22′57″W	301 (91.8)	23	1974	Residential	Formerly known as the Atlanta Center Building. Office building converted to residential. Shares a base with the taller Atlanta Hilton Hotel.
122	AMLI Arts Center		Midtown 33°47′20″N 84°23′18″W	301 (91.7)	30	2017	Residential	
123	Square On Fifth		Midtown 33°46′41″N 84°23′21″W	301 (91.7)	26	2015	Residential	
124	Merchandise Mart		Downtown 33°45′38″N 84°23′19″W	300 (91.4)	22	1961	Office	
125	Coca-Cola USA Building		Downtown 33°46′13″N 84°23′52″W	300 (91.4)	20	1987	Office	Part of Coca Cola's headquarters at One Coca Cola Plaza.

== Tallest buildings in Metro Atlanta ==
Metro Atlanta
- Population: 6,411,149 (2024 estimate)
- Cities included: Atlanta, Brookhaven, Dunwoody, Sandy Springs, Vinings, Cumberland

Number of tall buildings (2026)
- Taller than 100 m (328 ft): 107
- Taller than 150 m (492 ft): 20
- Taller than 200 m (656 ft): 11
- Taller than 300 m (984 ft): 1

Number of tall buildings — feet
- Taller than 300 ft (91.4 m): 137

There are 12 high-rises taller than 300 feet (91 m) in Metro Atlanta that are located outside of the city limits of Atlanta itself. Four of them are in Dunwoody, and another four in neighboring Sandy Springs. Along with Brookhaven, these three cities form the edge city of Perimeter Center. The rest are in Cumberland and Vinings.

Rank	Name	Image	City	Height ft (m)	Floors	Year	Purpose	Notes
1	Concourse Corporate Center V		Sandy Springs 33°55′01″N 84°21′16″W	570 (173.7)	34	1988	Office	Tallest building in Metro Atlanta outside of Atlanta. Part of the Concourse at Landmark Center complex.
2	Concourse Corporate Center VI		Sandy Springs 33°55′01″N 84°21′21″W	553 (168.6)	34	1991	Office	Part of the Concourse at Landmark Center complex.
3	TKE Innovation and Qualification Center Tower		Cumberland 33°53′11″N 84°28′11″W	446 (135.8)	13	2022	Mixed-use	Used mainly as an elevator test tower, but also as an office and an observation tower. Tallest building in Cumberland.
4	Three Ravinia Drive		Dunwoody 33°55′15″N 84°20′06″W	444 (135.3)	33	1991	Office	Tallest building in Dunwoody.
5	Summit One		Brookhaven 33°54′57″N 84°20′28″W	381 (116.1)	27	1995	Office	Also known as the Hewlett-Packard Building.
6	Riverwood 100 Tower		Vinings 33°52′40″N 84°27′29″W	362 (110.3)	26	1989	Office	Tallest building in Vinings from 1989 to 2022.
7	Cox Communications Headquarters		Sandy Springs 33°55′30″N 84°20′58″W	357 (109)	19	2015	Office	Headquarters of Cox Enterprises.
8	CHOA Arthur M. Blank Hospital		Brookhaven 33°49′52″N 84°19′49″W	350 (107)	19	2024	Hospital	
9	Park Towers II		Sandy Springs 33°55′04″N 84°21′36″W	350 (106.7)	33	1999	Residential	Also known as The Eve Atlanta. Tallest residential building in Sandy Springs.
10	Park Center 2		Dunwoody 33°55′11″N 84°20′46″W	323 (98.4)	22	2020	Office	
11	Park Center 1		Dunwoody 33°55′12″N 84°20′40″W	317 (96.5)	22	2016	Office	
12	The Manhattan		Dunwoody 33°55′51″N 84°20′35″W	305 (93)	27	2006	Residential	Tallest residential building in Dunwoody.

== Tallest under construction ==
There are currently no buildings expected to be at least 300 ft (91 m) tall as of 2026.

Architecturally topped out but not yet completed

Name	Height ft (m)	Image	Floors	Year	Purpose	Notes

== Timeline of tallest buildings ==
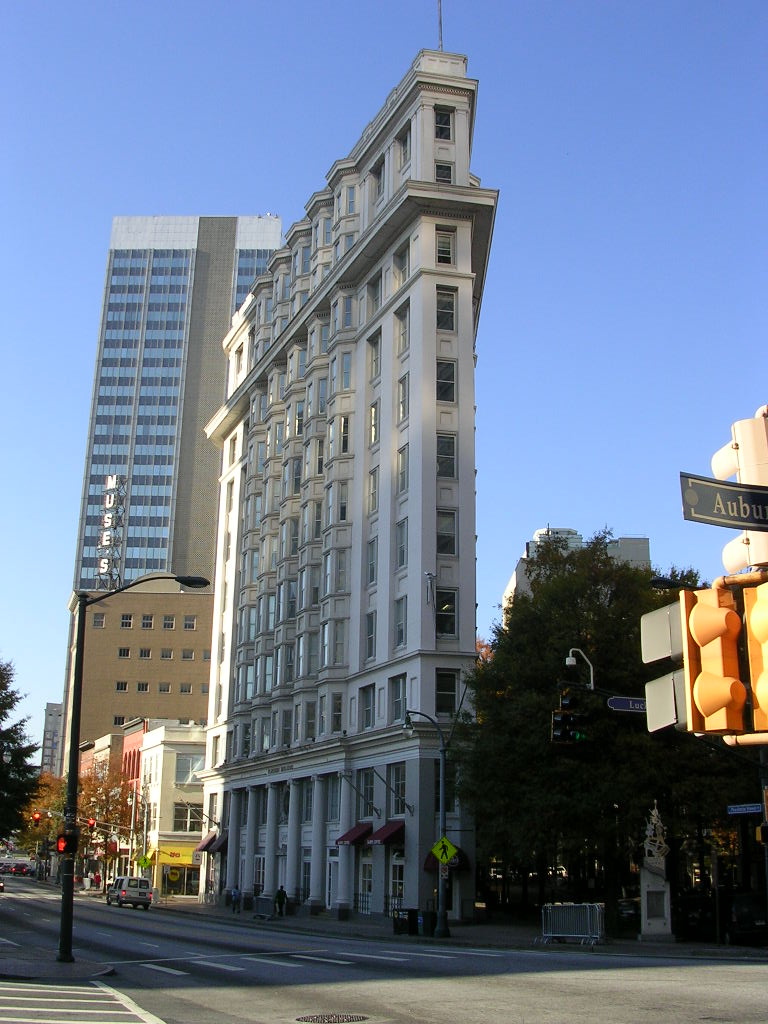
The Flatiron Building stood as the tallest building in Atlanta from 1897 until 1901.

This lists buildings that once held the title of tallest building in Atlanta.

Name	Image	Street address	Years as tallest	Height ft (m)	Floors	Reference
Equitable Building (Note: This building was demolished in 1971.)		30–44 Edgewood Avenue SE	1892–1897	117 ft (36 m) (Note: Official height figures have never been released by this building's developer.)	8	
Flatiron Building		84 Peachtree Street NW	1897–1901	160 ft (49 m)	11	
Empire Building (Note: This building was originally known as the Empire Building (from 1901 until 1920), and was the headquarters of Citizens & Southern National Bank (merged with NationsBank/merged with Bank of America) but has been known as the Georgia State University J. Mack Robinson College of Business Administration Building since 1992.)		35 Broad Street NW	1901–1905	185 ft (56 m)	14	
Fourth National Bank Building		14 Peachtree Street NW	1905–1906	N/A	16	
Candler Building		127 Peachtree Street NE	1906–1929	N/A	17	
Rhodes-Haverty Building (Note: This building was originally known as the Rhodes-Haverty Building, but has since been renamed the Marriott Residence Inn-Downtown.)		134 Peachtree Street NW	1929–1958	246 ft (75 m)	21	
Fulton National Bank (Note: This building was originally known Fulton National Bank, but has since been renamed 55 Marietta Street.)		55 Marietta Street NW	1958–1961	295 ft (90 m)	21	
One Park Tower		34 Peachtree Street	1961–1967	439 ft (134 m)	32	
State of Georgia Building		2 Peachtree Street NW	1967–1976	556 ft (169 m)	44	
Westin Peachtree Plaza Hotel		210 Peachtree Street NW	1976–1987	723 ft (220 m)	73	
One Atlantic Center		1201 West Peachtree Street NE	1987–1992	820 ft (250 m)	50	
Bank of America Plaza		600 Peachtree Street NE	1992–present	1,023 ft (312 m)	55	

== Skylines ==
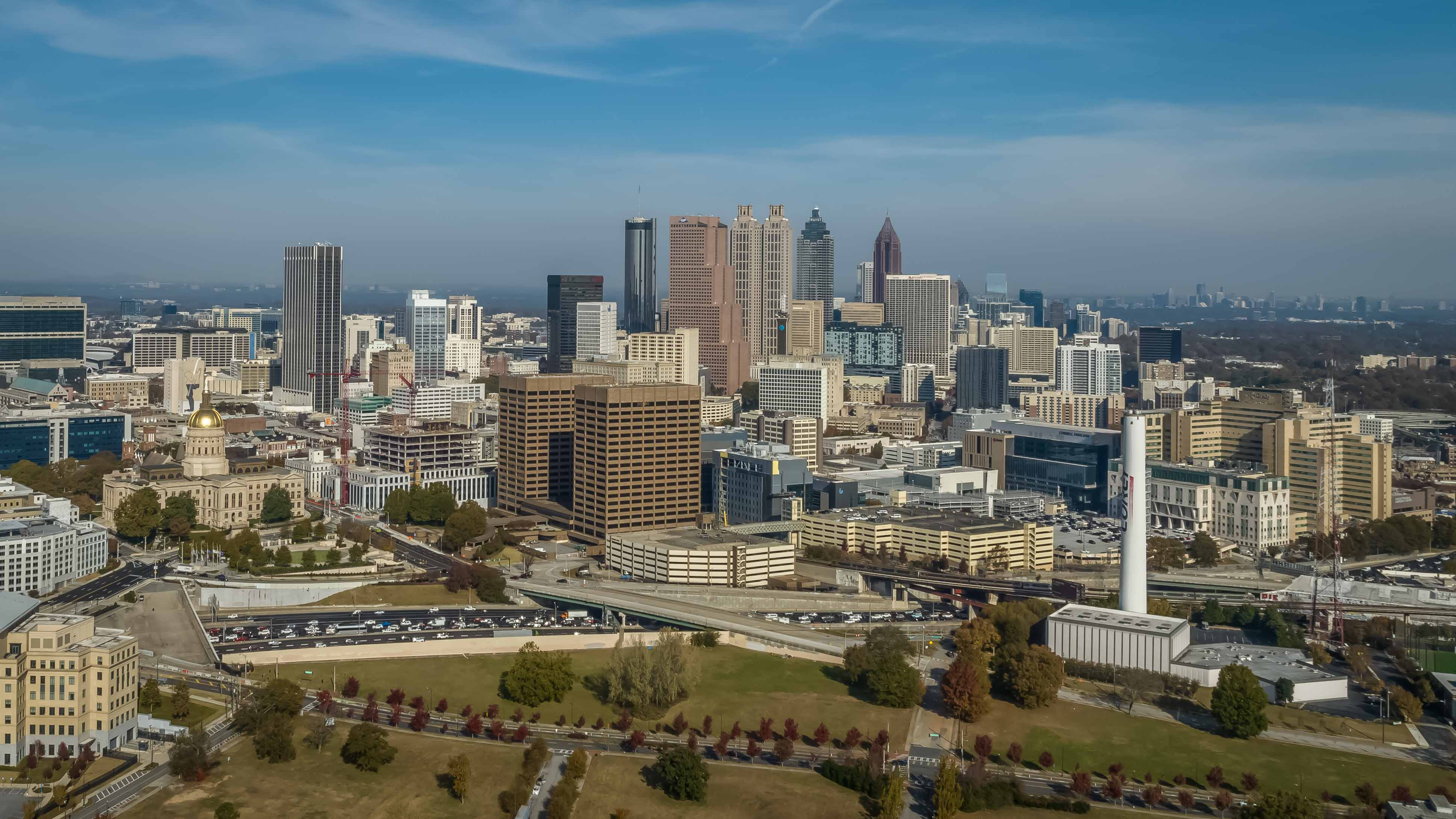
Downtown Atlanta

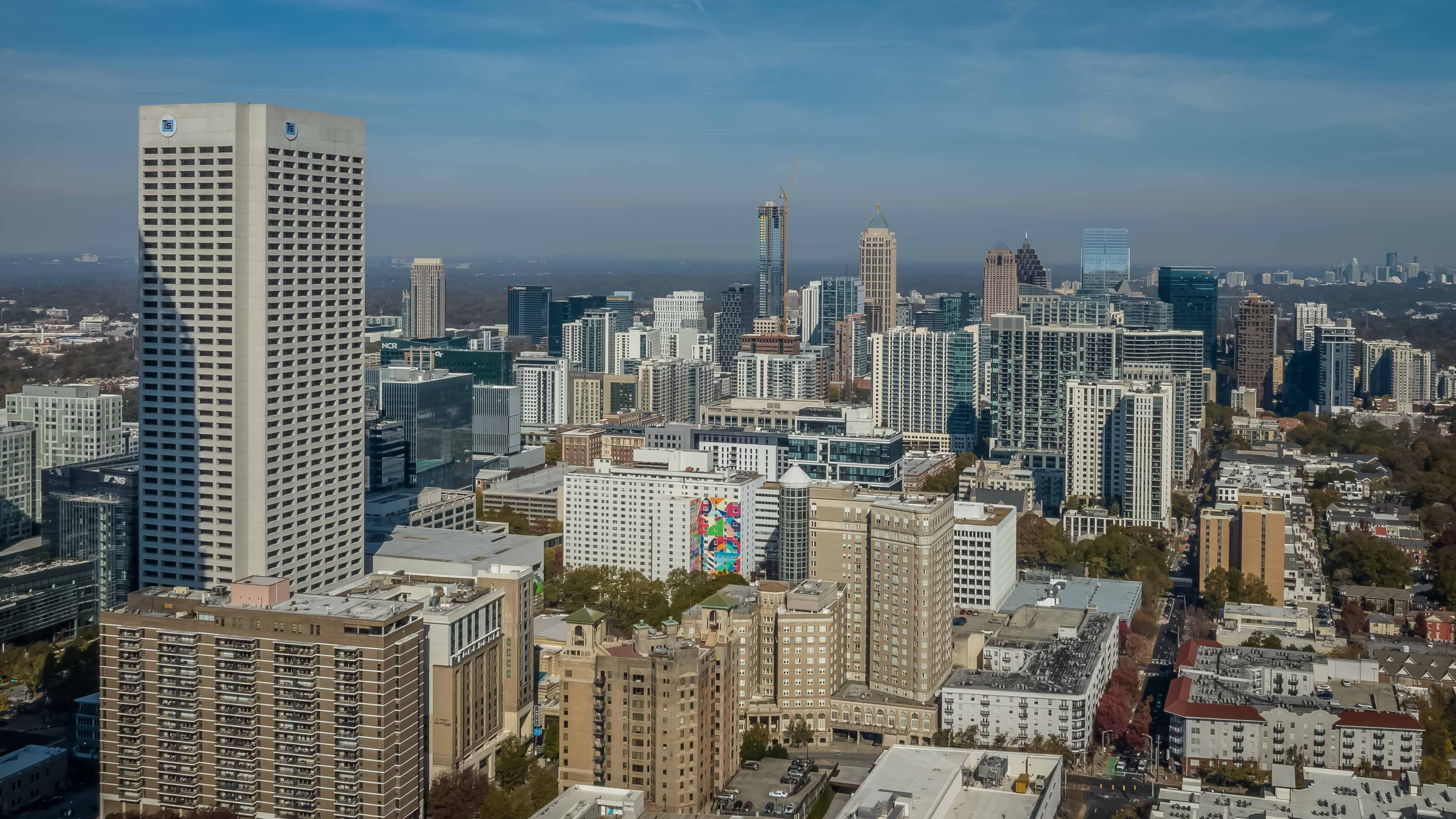
Midtown Atlanta

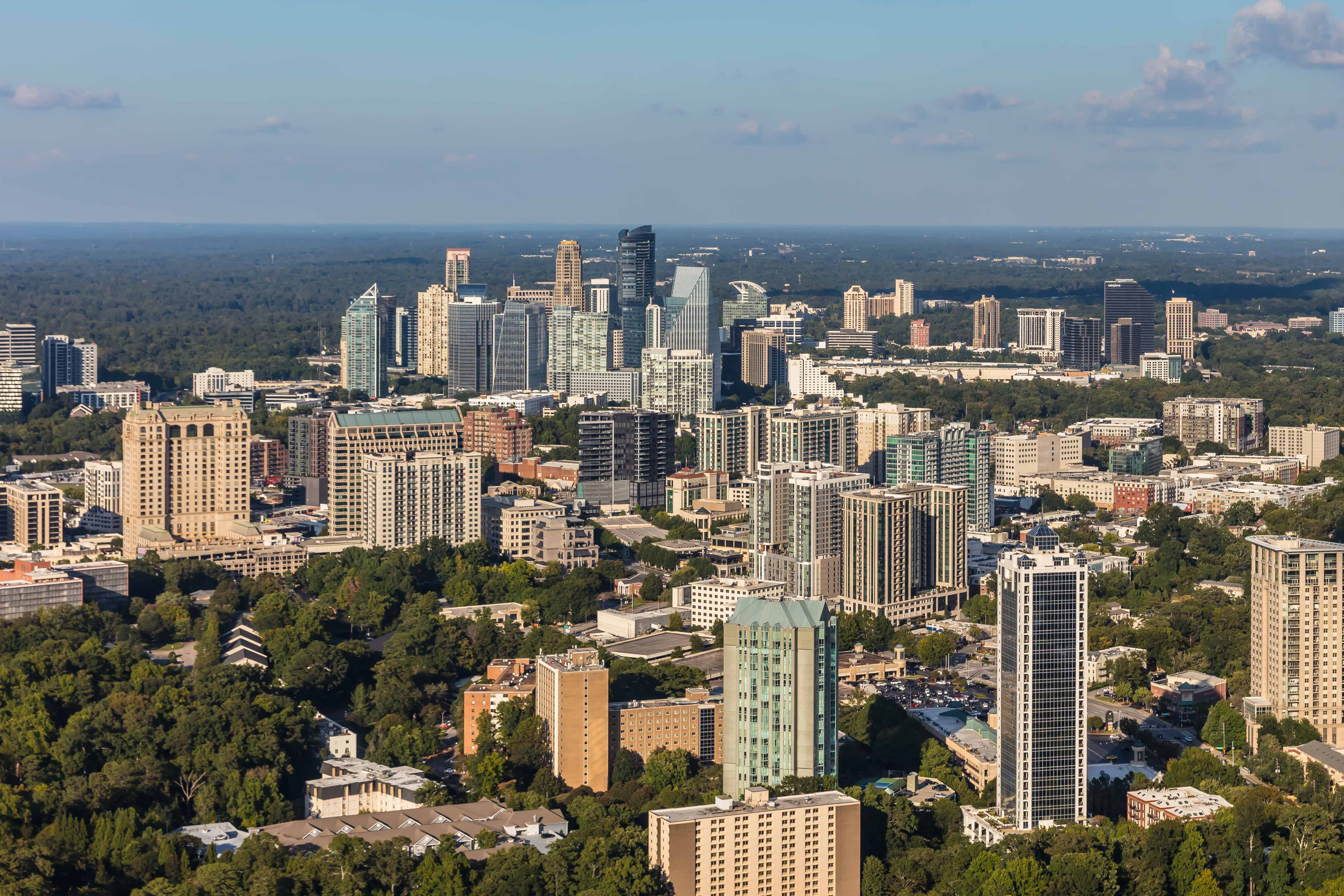
Buckhead

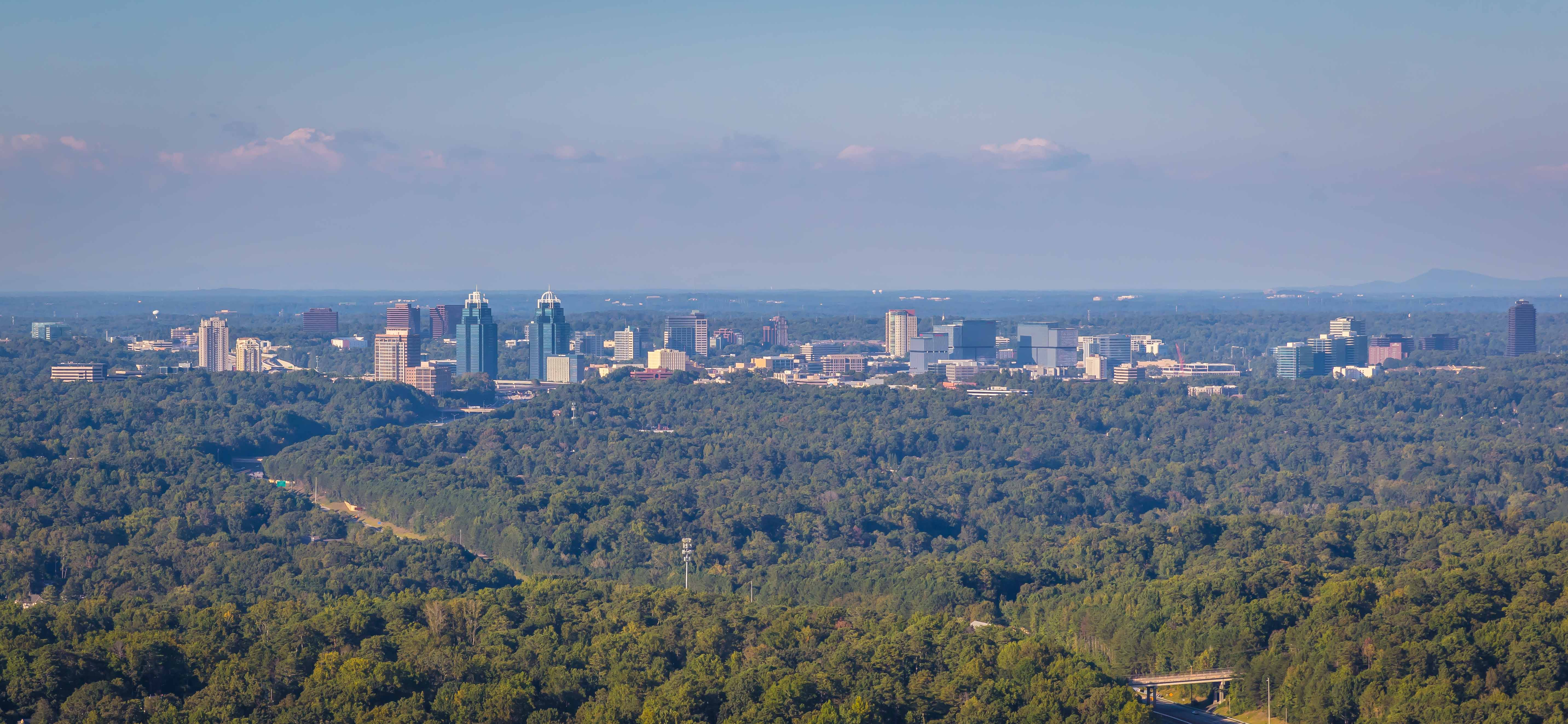
Perimeter Center

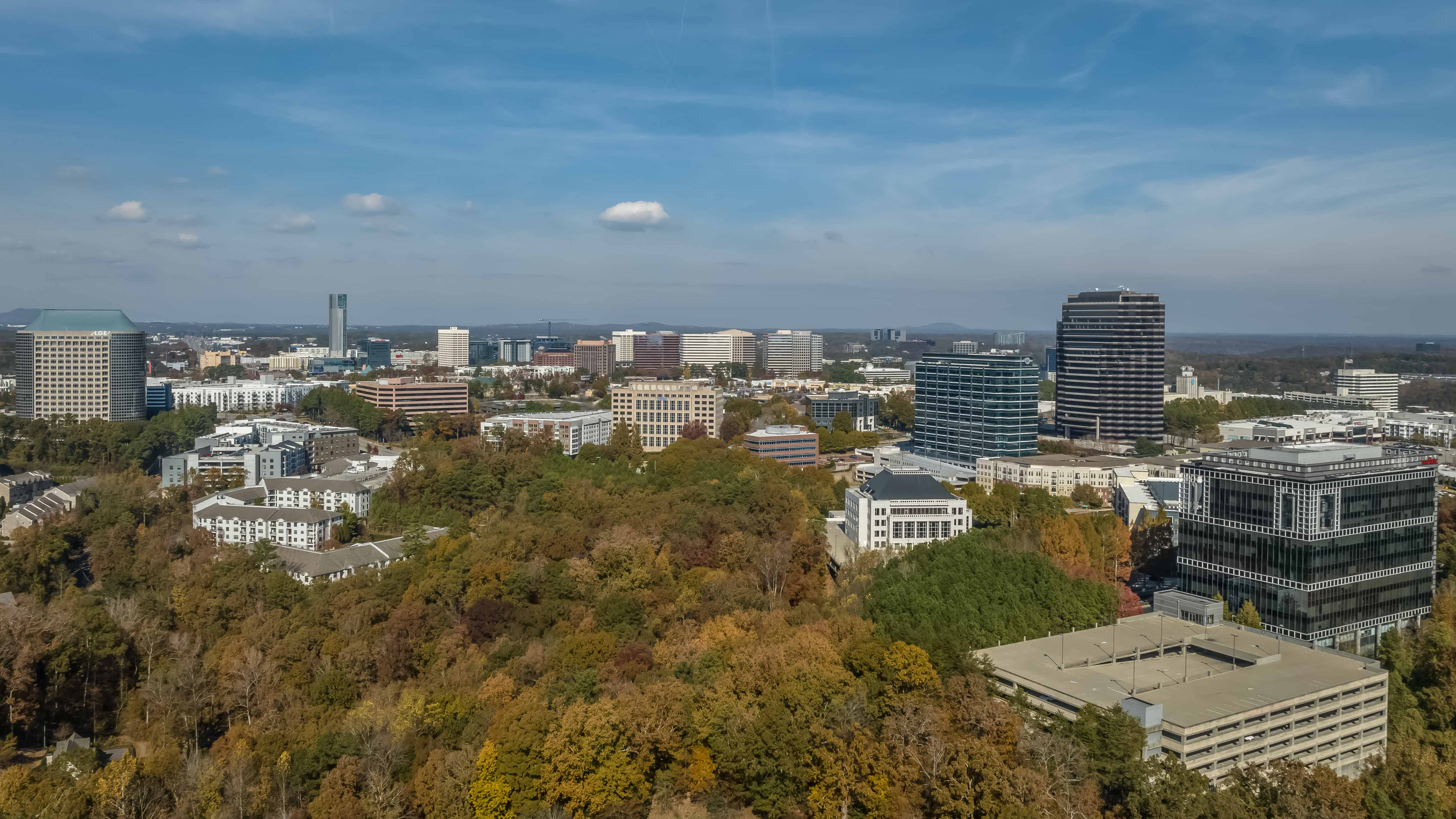
Cumberland
