= One Park Tower =

One Park Tower may refer to:

- One Park Tower (Atlanta), also known as 34 Peachtree Street
- One Park Tower (Mississauga), a high-rise building in Mississauga
