= Joe Amisano =

American architect

Joe Amisano (1917–2008) was an American architect, especially known for his work in Atlanta. Born in New York, he graduated from Pratt Institute in 1940 and won a Prix de Rome in 1950. He joined the Atlanta firm that became Toombs, Amisano and Wells in 1954.

== Works ==
- Lenox Square mall (1958)
- Regency Square Mall (Jacksonville) (1967)
- Woodruff Arts Center (Atlanta Memorial Arts Building) (1968)
- Unitarian Universalist Congregation of Atlanta (1968)
- Peachtree Summit (1975)
- Peachtree Center (MARTA station) (1982–1983)
- Robert W. Woodruff Library, Atlanta University Center (1983)
