= Park Place (Atlanta) =

Park Place on Peachtree
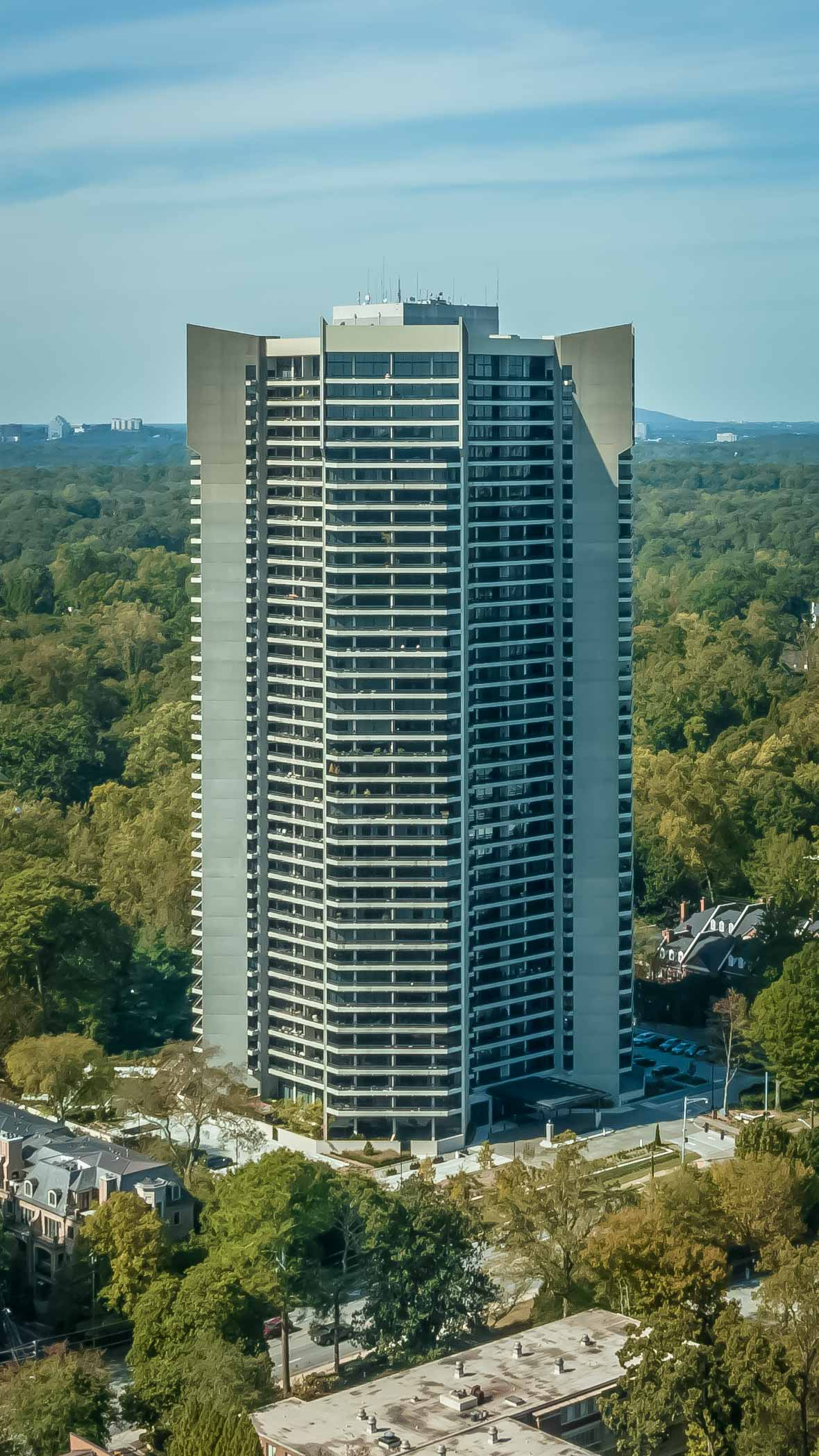
- Interactive map of the Park Place on Peachtree area

General information
- Type: Residential
- Location: 2660 Peachtree Road NW, Atlanta, Georgia
- Coordinates: 33.8276°N 84.3882°W
- Completed: 1986

Height
- Roof: 420 ft (130 m)

Technical details
- Floor count: 40

Design and construction
- Developer: The Brickstone Companies

Park Place on Peachtree is a 420 ft (128m) tall skyscraper in Buckhead, Atlanta, Georgia. It was completed in 1986 and has 40 floors. It is the 27th tallest building in Atlanta. The skyscraper, developed and managed by The Brickstone Companies, houses 294 condominium units. Famous occupants of the building have included Elton John and Coretta Scott King.

== See also ==
- List of tallest buildings in Atlanta
