= Park Avenue Condominiums =

Residential skyscraper in Atlanta, Georgia

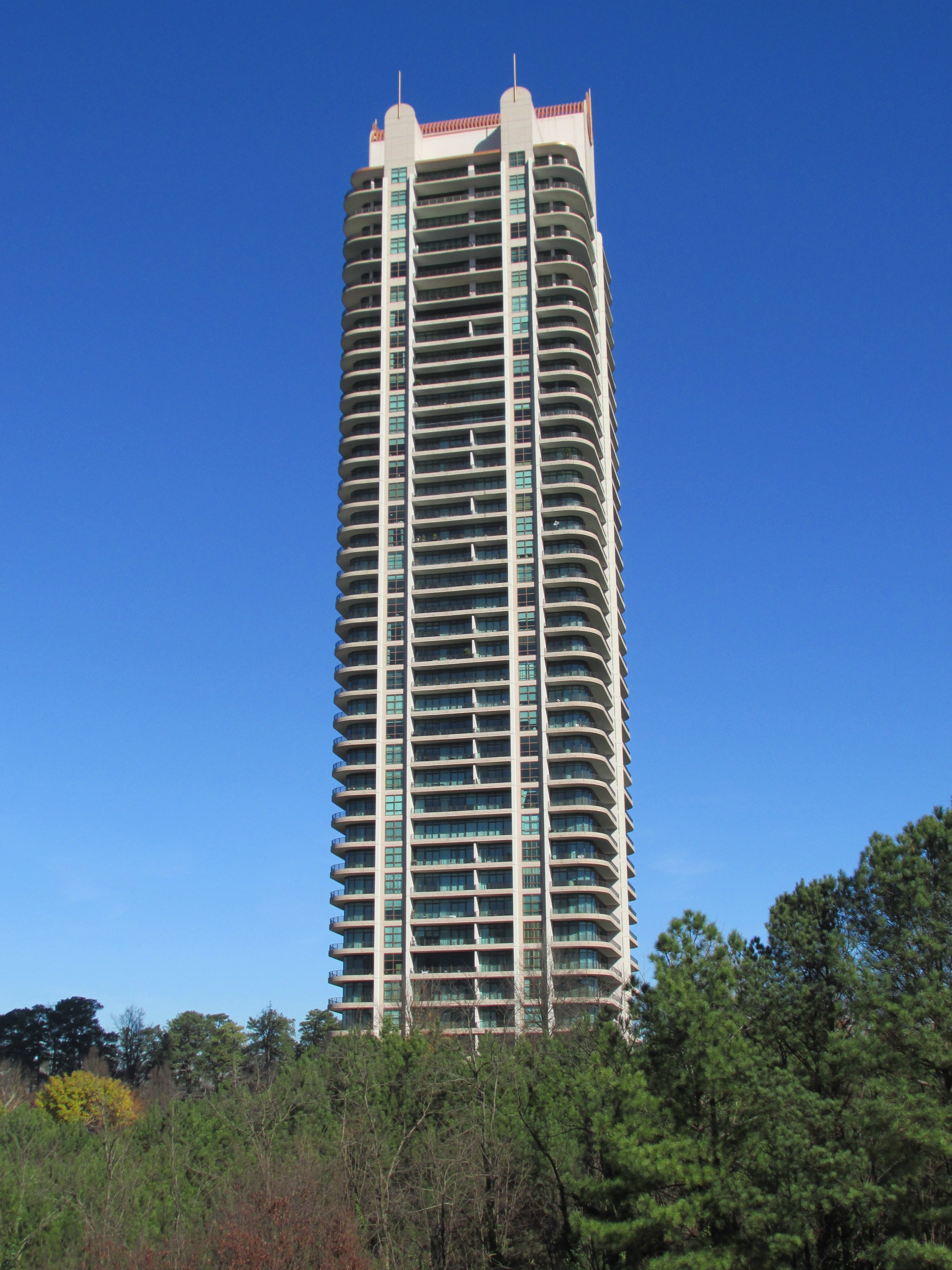
- Park Avenue Condominiums
- Interactive map of the Park Avenue Condominiums area

General information
- Location: 750 Park Avenue NE, Atlanta, Georgia
- Coordinates: 33.8553°N 84.3618°W
- Construction started: 1998
- Completed: 2000

Height
- Roof: 486 ft (148 m)

Technical details
- Floor count: 44

Design and construction
- Architect: Burt Hill Kosar Rittelmann Associates

Park Avenue Condominiums is a 486 ft (148m) tall skyscraper in Atlanta, Georgia. Construction was completed in 2000. The building has 44 floors and 3 basement levels for parking. Burt Hill Kosar Rittelmann Associates designed the building, which is the 16th tallest in Atlanta and was the tallest all residential tower until TWELVE Centennial Park surpassed it in 2007.

== See also ==
- List of tallest buildings in Atlanta
