= The Hue Midtown =

Residential skyscraper in Atlanta, Georgia

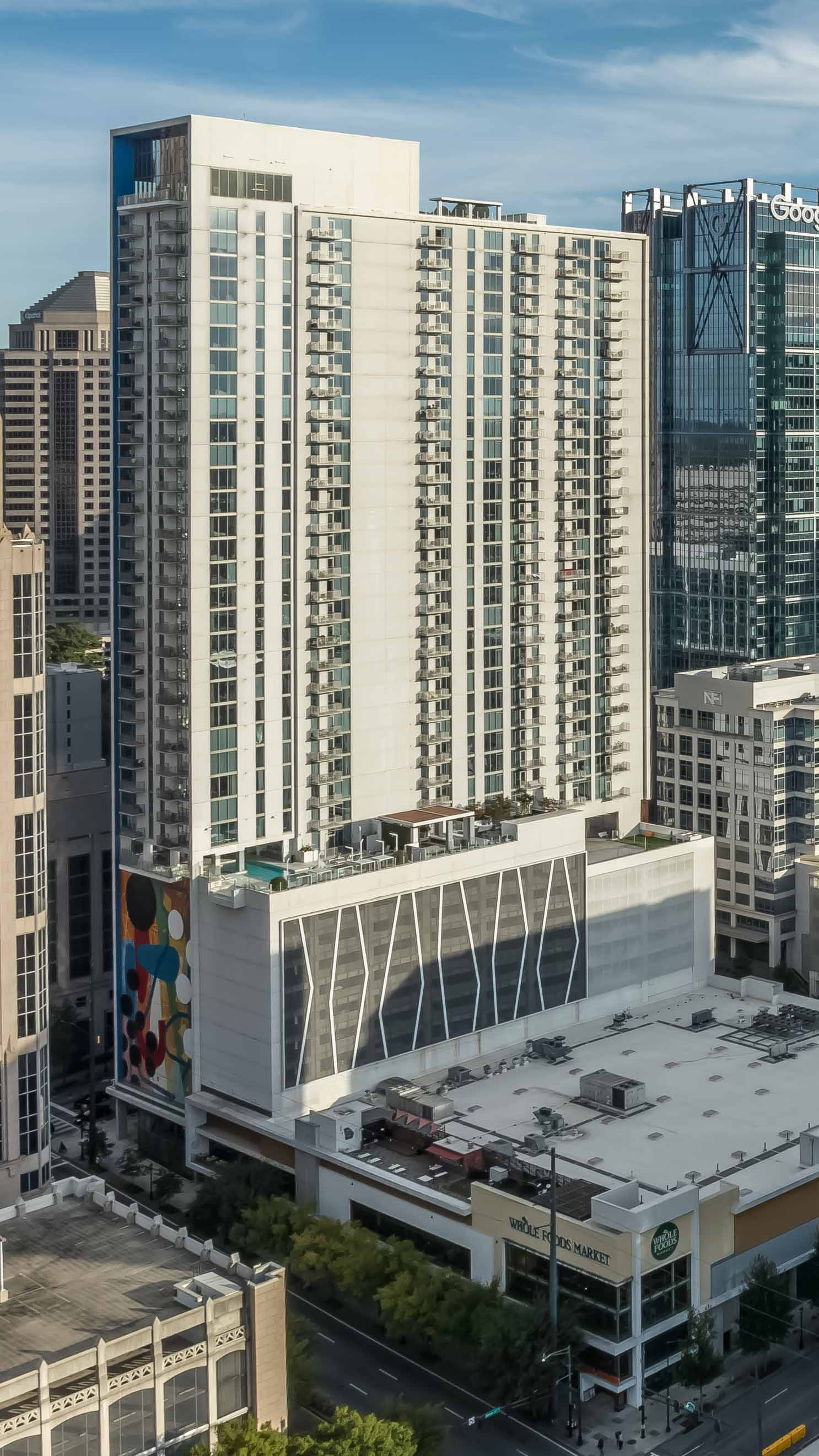
- The Hue Midtown in 2025
- Interactive map of the The Hue Midtown area

General information
- Status: Completed
- Type: Residential
- Location: 22 Peachtree Street & 14th Street, Atlanta, Georgia
- Coordinates: 33°47′10″N 84°23′17″W
- Construction started: 2016
- Completed: 2018

Height
- Roof: 515 ft (157 m)

Technical details
- Floor count: 39

Design and construction
- Architect: Smallwood, Reynolds, Stewart, Stewart
- Developer: The Related Group
- Main contractor: Balfour Beatty Ground Engineering

The Hue Midtown (also known as Icon Midtown) is a residential skyscraper in the Midtown District of Atlanta, Georgia. Built between 2016 and 2018, the tower stands at 515 ft (157 m) tall with 39 floors and is the current 16th tallest building in Atlanta.

== History ==
The building is part of an urban planning ambition to enhance the skyline of Atlanta's Midtown District. The tower's approach is focused on the creation of cohesion between luxurious spaces. The two main architectural elements of the tower are the amenity space designed as a recreational and social hub on the eleventh floor, and the rooftop cigar bar on the 39th floor.

== See also ==
- List of tallest buildings in Atlanta
