= 1072 West Peachtree Street =

Skyscraper in Atlanta

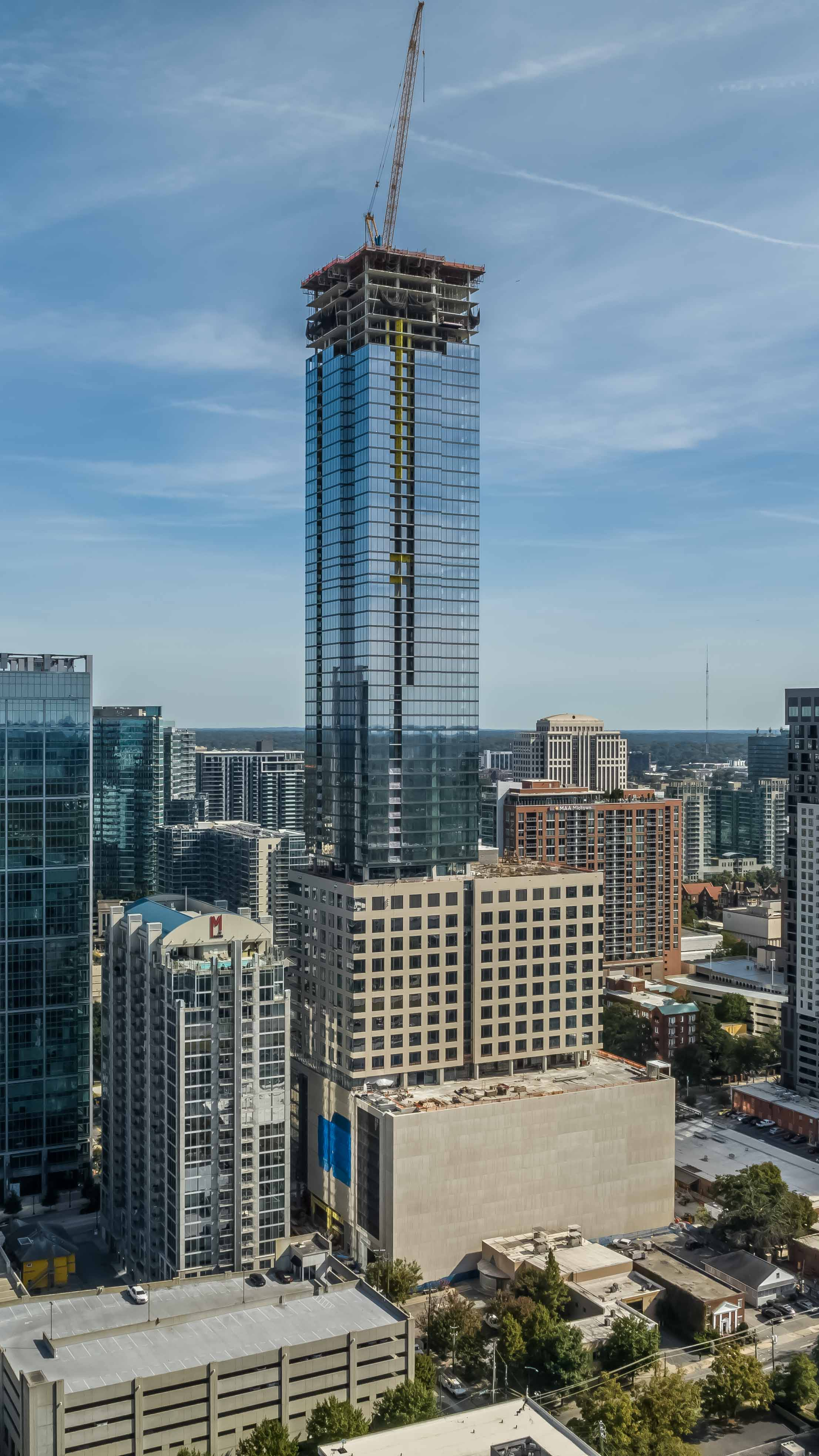
- 1072 West Peachtree Street under construction in October 2025
- Alternative names: Alina (residential portion)

General information
- Status: Under construction
- Type: Mixed-use
- Classification: Skyscraper
- Location: Midtown, Atlanta, Georgia, United States, 1072 West Peachtree Street NW
- Coordinates: 33°47′03″N 84°23′17″W
- Groundbreaking: July 2023
- Estimated completion: 2026

Height
- Height: 749 ft (228 m)

Technical details
- Floor count: 60
- Floor area: 224,000 sq ft (20,800 m^{2}) (office)

Design and construction
- Architect: Tvsdesign
- Developer: Rockefeller Group, Taisei Corporation and Mitsubishi Estate
- Structural engineer: Walter P Moore
- Main contractor: Turner Construction

Other information
- Number of units: 357 apartments

Website
- 1072westpeachtree.com

1072 West Peachtree Street is a 60-story mixed-use skyscraper in Midtown, Atlanta, Georgia, United States. Jointly developed by the Rockefeller Group, Taisei Corporation, and Mitsubishi Estate, the tower topped out structurally in late 2025 and was completed in 2026. The building's residential portion is branded as Alina, consisting of 357 apartments, while the lower levels contain approximately 224,000 square feet of Class A office space. Standing at 749 feet (228 m), it is be fifth-tallest building in Atlanta and the tallest structure built in the city since the early 1990s.
