= The Pinnacle (Atlanta) =

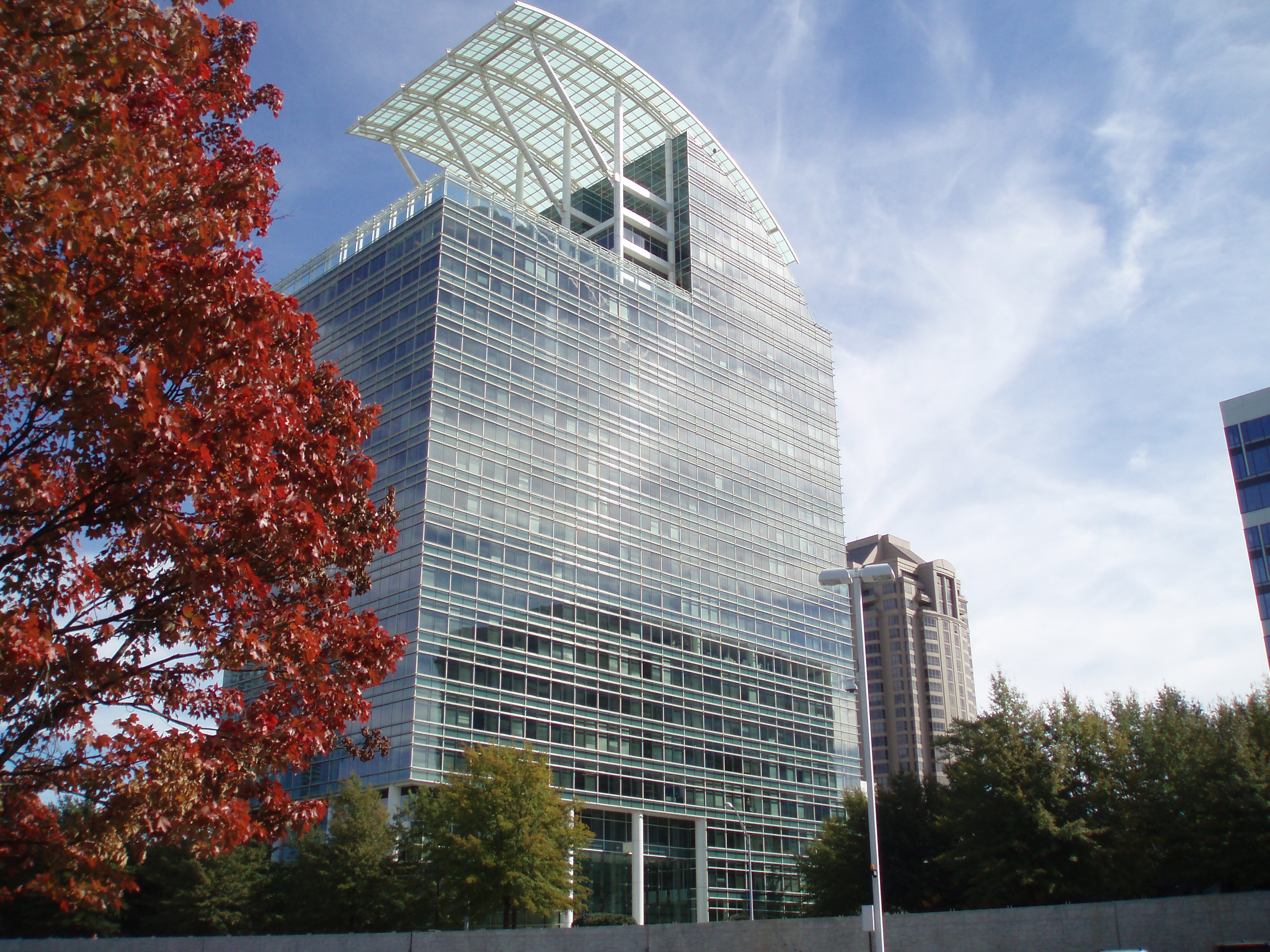
- The Pinnacle in 2010
- Interactive map of the The Pinnacle area

General information
- Type: Commercial offices
- Location: 3455 Peachtree Rd NE; Atlanta, GA 30326
- Coordinates: 33.850303°N 84.361826°W
- Completed: 1998

Height
- Antenna spire: 115 m (377 ft)
- Roof: 115 m (377 ft)

Technical details
- Floor count: 22

Design and construction
- Architects: Jon Pickard, Pickard Chilton
- Developer: Cousins

Website
- www.thepinnacleatlanta.com

The Pinnacle is a 22-story skyscraper designed by architecture studio Pickard Chilton in the Buckhead district of Atlanta. Built at the corner of Lenox and Peachtree Roads, construction was finished in 1998. Given that Buckhead is the financial center of both Atlanta and the Southeast, many of the buildings tenants are in the financial sector, including brokerage and consulting firms such as Merrill Lynch and Morgan Stanley.

== See also ==
- List of tallest buildings in Atlanta
