= 2828 Peachtree =

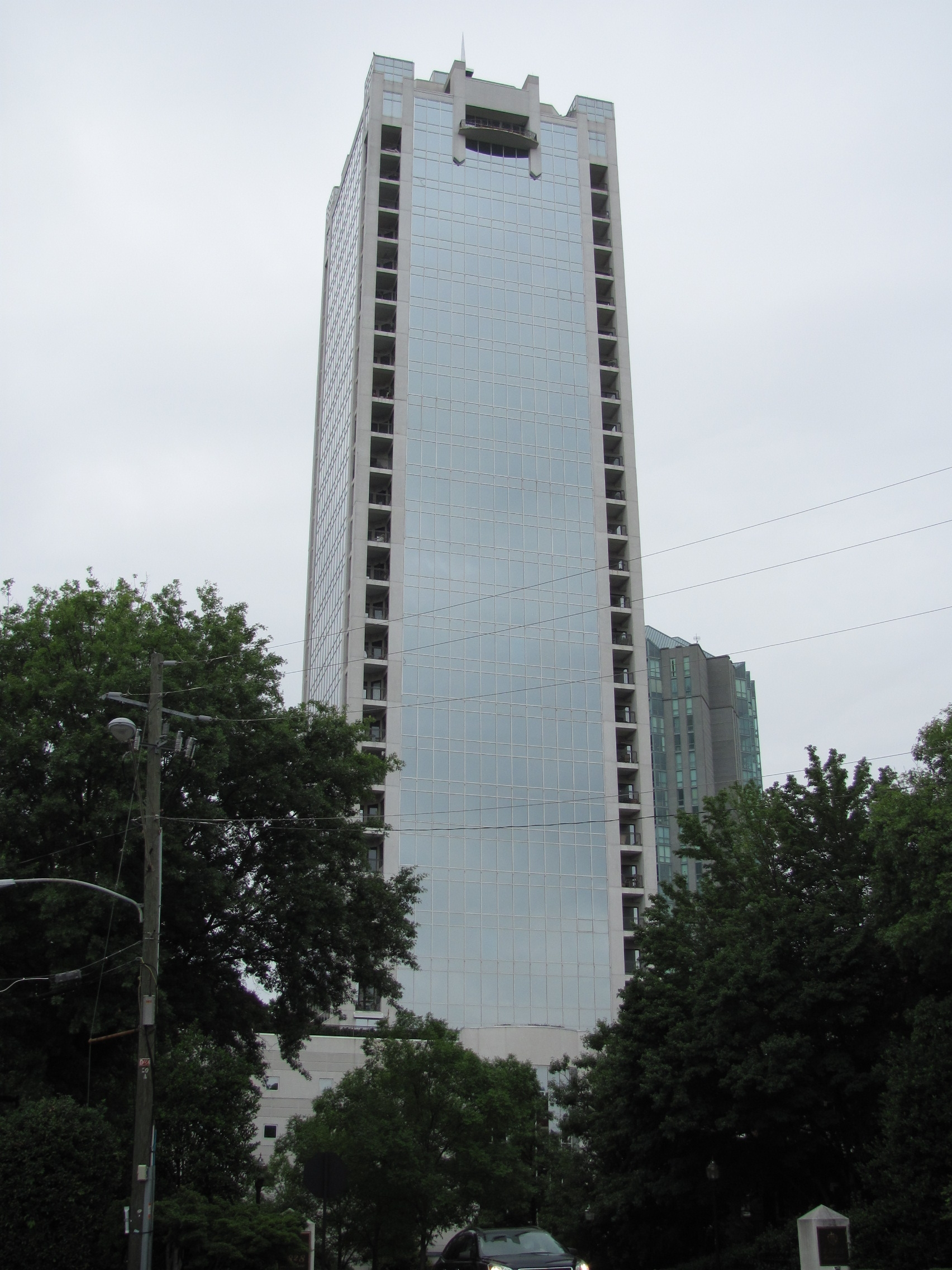
- 2828 Peachtree
- Interactive map of the 2828 Peachtree area

General information
- Type: Residential
- Location: 2828 Peachtree Road, NW
- Coordinates: 33°49′59″N 84°23′7″W
- Construction started: 1999
- Completed: 2002
- Opening: July 3, 2002
- Cost: $36 million

Height
- Roof: 421 ft (128 m)

Technical details
- Floor count: 32
- Floor area: 291,000
- Lifts/elevators: 2

Design and construction
- Architect: Womack + Hampton L.L.C

2828 Peachtree is a 421-foot-tall skyscraper (128 m) in Atlanta, Georgia. Completed in 2002, the modern high-rise features 79 condominium units across 32 stories, built atop a five-story parking garage.

The building was designed by the architectural firm Womack + Hampton L.L.C. It features a maximum of four residential units per floor, equipped with floor-to-ceiling windows and private balconies.

== See also ==
- List of tallest buildings in Atlanta
