= 1105 West Peachtree =

Mixed-used structure in Atlanta, Georgia

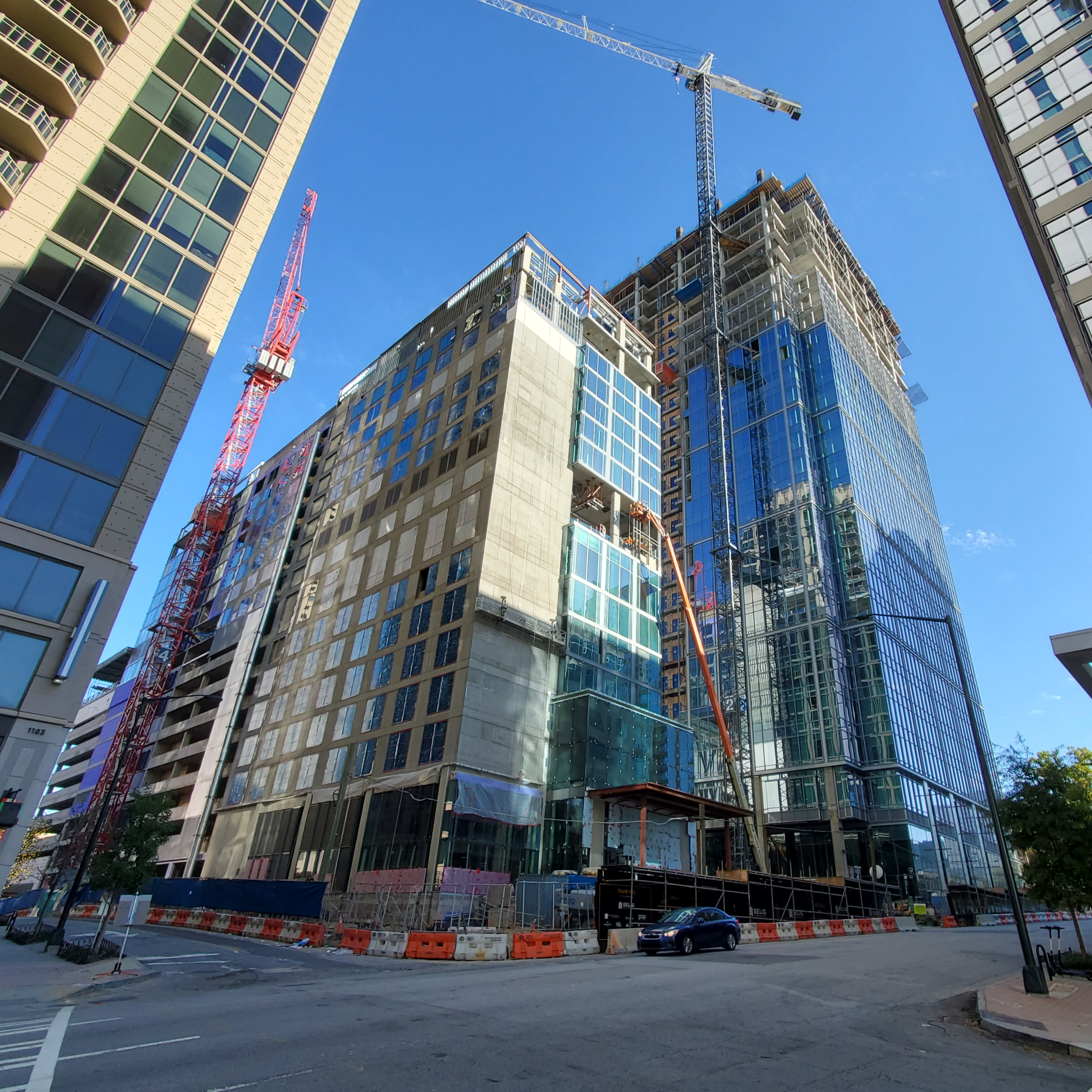
- 1105 West Peachtree under construction (2020)
- Interactive map of 1105 West Peachtree
- Location: Atlanta, Georgia, United States
- Address: 1105 West Peachtree Street
- Coordinates: 33°47′5″N 84°23′15″W
- Status: Built
- Constructed: Oct. 2019-Sept. 2021

Companies
- Architect: Rule Joy Trammell & Rubio
- Contractor: Brasfield & Gorrie
- Owner: Selig Enterprises

Technical details
- Size: 3.5 acres (1.4 ha)

1105 West Peachtree is a mixed-use development in Atlanta, Georgia, United States. Located along West Peachtree Street in Midtown Atlanta, the development would consist primarily of a 32-story office building and a smaller residential tower called 40 West 12th.

== History ==
The project, occupying a 3.5-acre (1.4-hectare) lot on West Peachtree Street in Midtown Atlanta, was announced by Selig Enterprises in December 2016. The project, which they announced would begin construction the following Summer, would consist of a 32-story office building featuring 645,000 square feet (59,900 m^{2}) of office space and a residential building housing 80 residences and a 150-room hotel. These two buildings would be connected by a raised plaza, with additional street level retail on the site. The architecture firm Rule Joy Trammell & Rubio would design the project, which had an expected cost of $400 million. In June 2017, Selig had applied for permits to demolish three preexisting buildings on the site, including the Dr. Marion Luther Brittain Sr. House, which was listed on the National Register of Historic Places. Permits were approved later that year, and by January 2018 the buildings were demolished. The next month, it was announced that the hotel for the project would be part of the Autograph Collection by Marriott International.

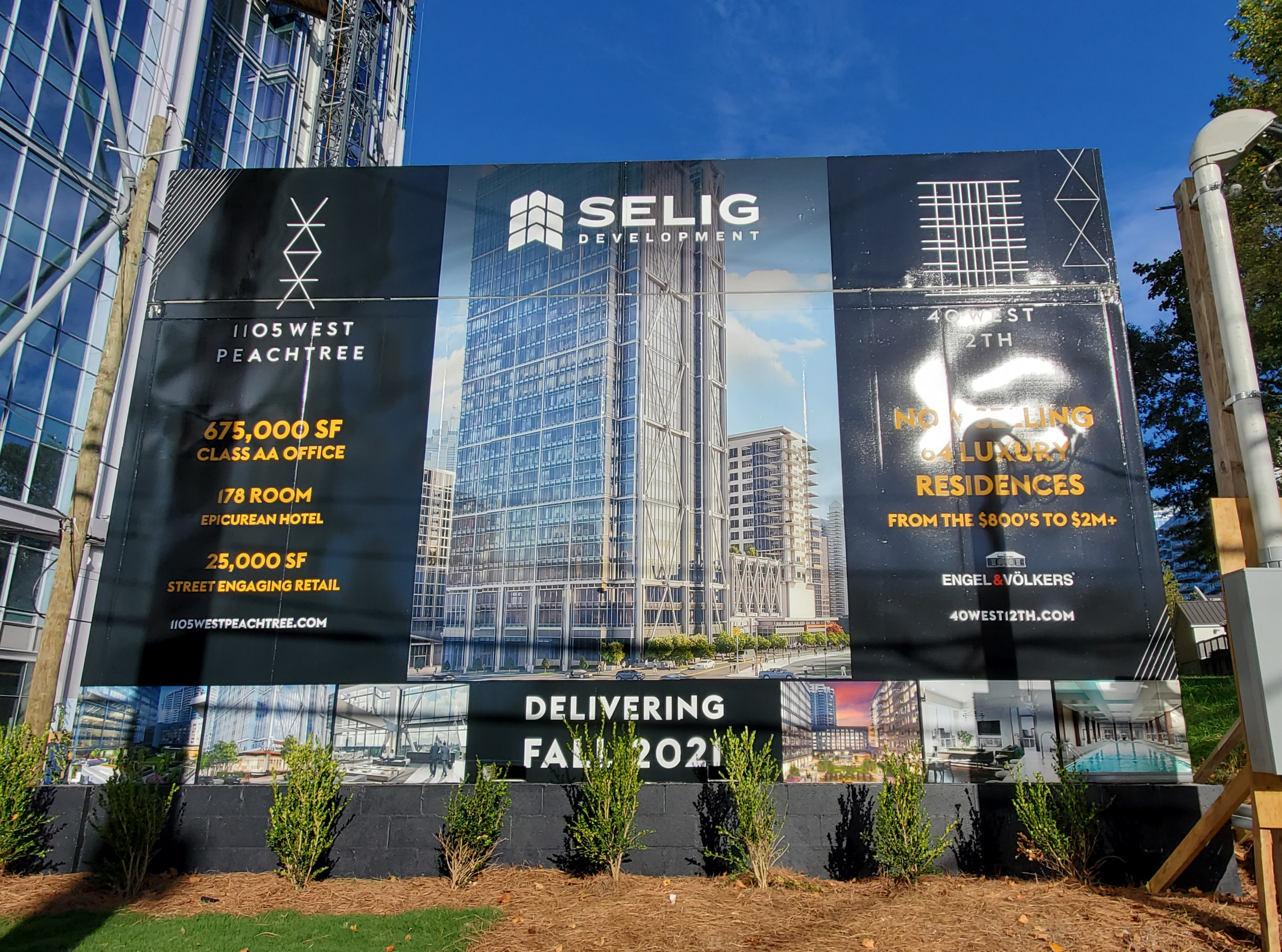
Advertisement for 1105 West Peachtree

In December 2018, Selig announced that construction on the project would begin in January of the following year. That same month, the project signed on its first tenants, a law firm relocating from Promenade II. By April 2019, condominiums at the property were being sold, with an opening scheduled for Spring 2021. In October, Cushman & Wakefield, acting for Selig, secured $340 million from The Blackstone Group, covering much of the budget, which by this time had risen to approximately $530 million. That same month, it was announced that Google was planning to occupy around 400,000 square feet (37,000 m^{2}) of office space, making them an anchor tenant for the project. The project held its official groundbreaking on October 28, 2019. By December 2019, specifications for the project had changed slightly, with plans for 675,000 square feet (62,700 m^{2}) of office space, a 178-room hotel, and 64 condominiums. In January 2020, Brasfield & Gorrie were announced as the project's general contractor, and that same month, the raised plaza, which will serve as a connecting deck between the two buildings, topped out.

On February 19, a tower crane at the construction site became unstable and started to lean due to a mechanical failure, causing authorities to close several nearby roadways as the crane was disassembled. Several nearby apartment buildings and parking garages were also evacuated.
