= 171 17th Street =

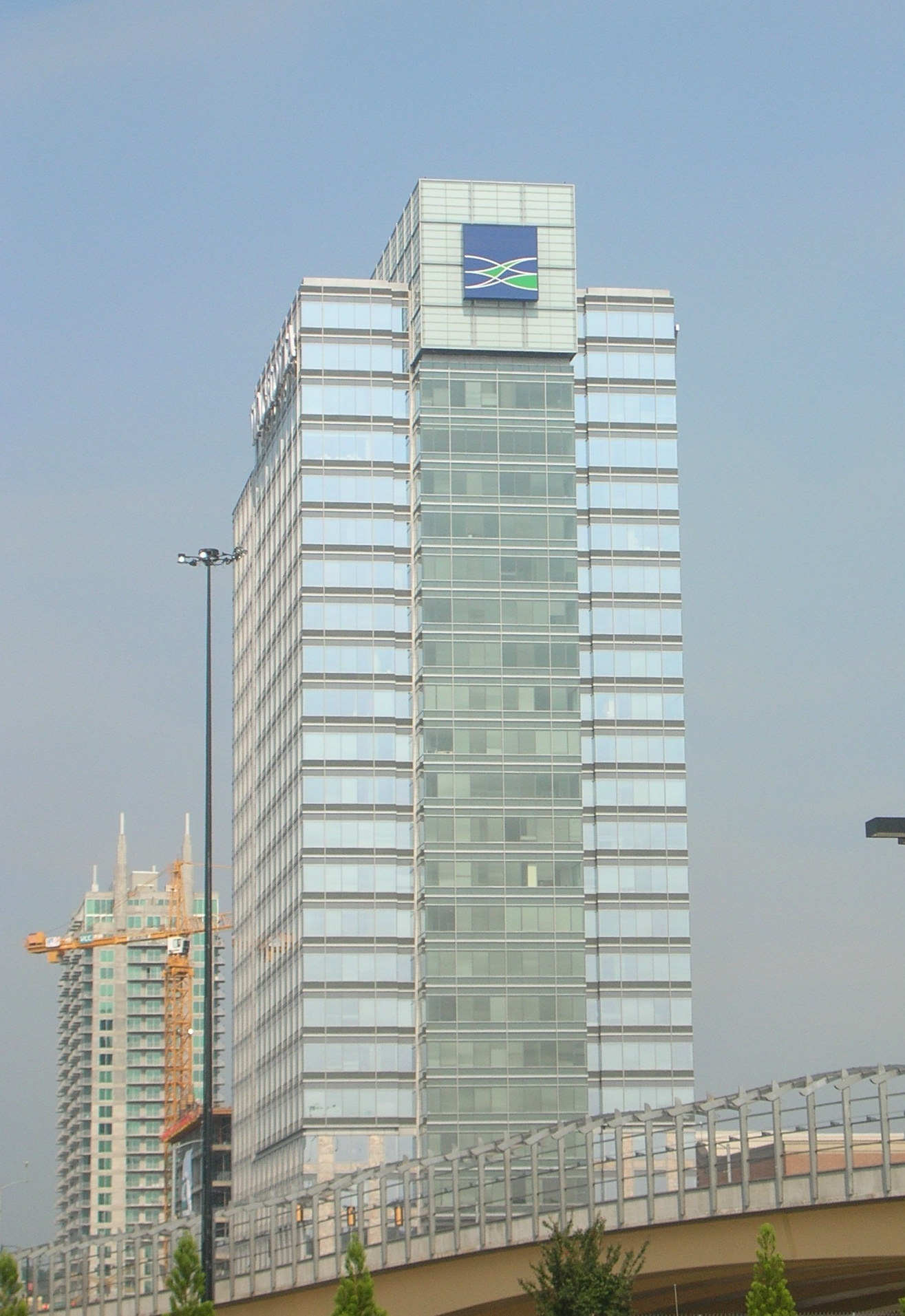
- Viewed from the Downtown Connector. (2006)
- Interactive map of the 171 17th Street area
- Former names: Southtrust Tower

General information
- Type: Commercial offices
- Location: 171 17th Street NW; Atlanta, United States
- Coordinates: 33.791326°N 84.394084°W
- Construction started: 2003
- Completed: 2004
- Owner: KBS Realty
- Operator: DTZ

Technical details
- Floor count: 22
- Floor area: 509,237 sq ft (47,309.7 m^{2})

Design and construction
- Architects: Smallwood-Reynolds-Stewart-Stewart & Associates Inc.
- Developer: AIG Global Real Estate
- Main contractor: Jacoby Development

171 17th Street is a skyscraper located in the Midtown district of Atlanta, Georgia, United States, within the Atlantic Station mixed-use development. It has 22 stories of office space and was completed in 2004, when it was called the Southtrust Tower. 171 17th Street was the first skyscraper in Atlanta west of the Downtown Connector and north of 14th Street.

== Overview ==
Originally intended to be the Atlanta headquarters for SouthTrust, shortly after its completion it became Wachovia's property following the 2004 merger of SouthTrust and Wachovia. When Wachovia merged with Wells Fargo in 2009, the Wachovia marquee atop the building was replaced with the Wells Fargo logo.

Developed by AIG Global Real Estate, 171 17th Street was awarded the silver certificate in the U.S. Green Building Council's Leadership in Energy and Environmental Design (LEED) Core and Shell Development program. 171 17th Street became the first-ever LEED Silver-Core and Shell certified high-rise office building, and the first high-rise office building in Georgia to receive any LEED certification.

== Gallery ==
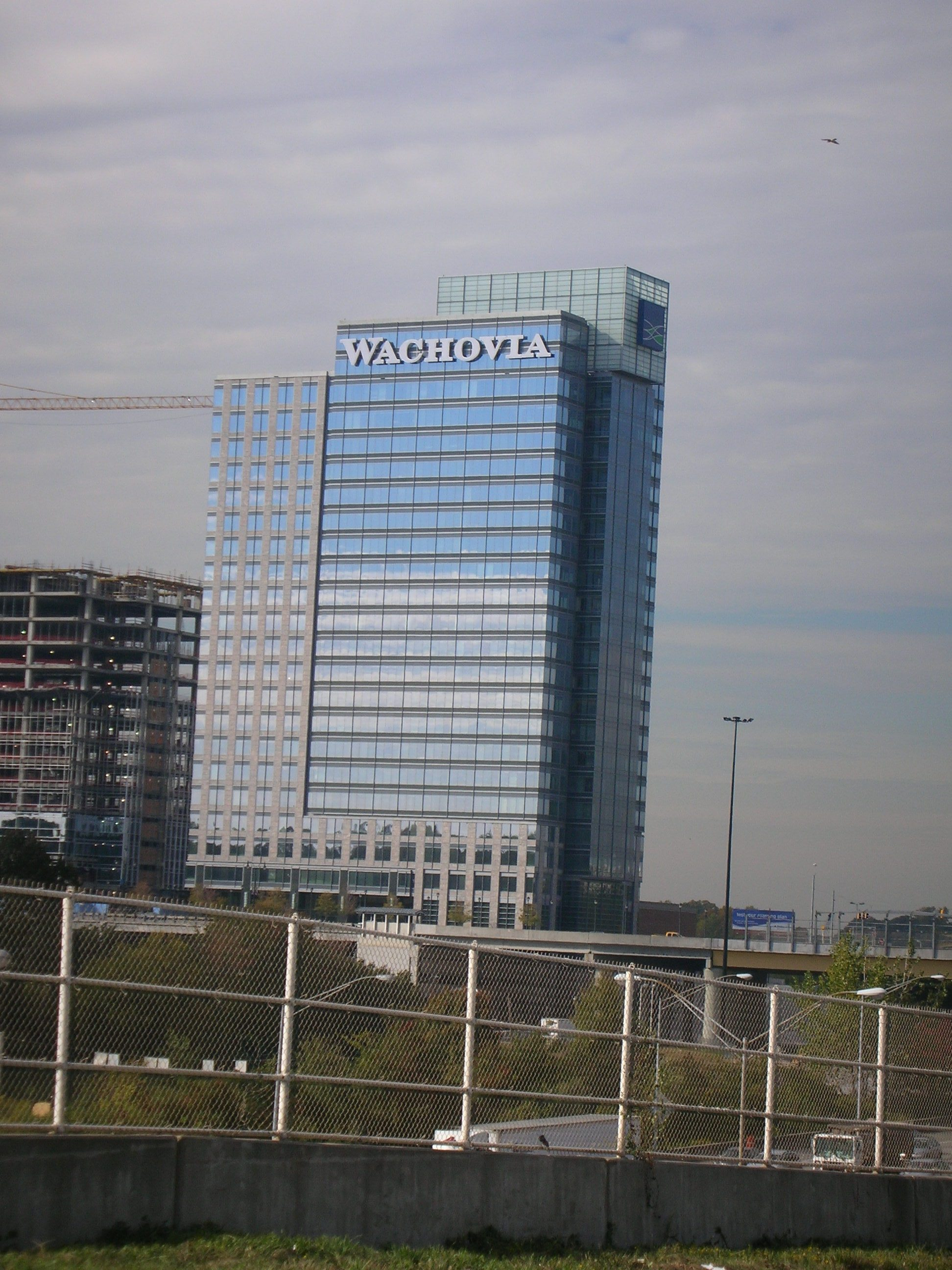
Seen from the southeast

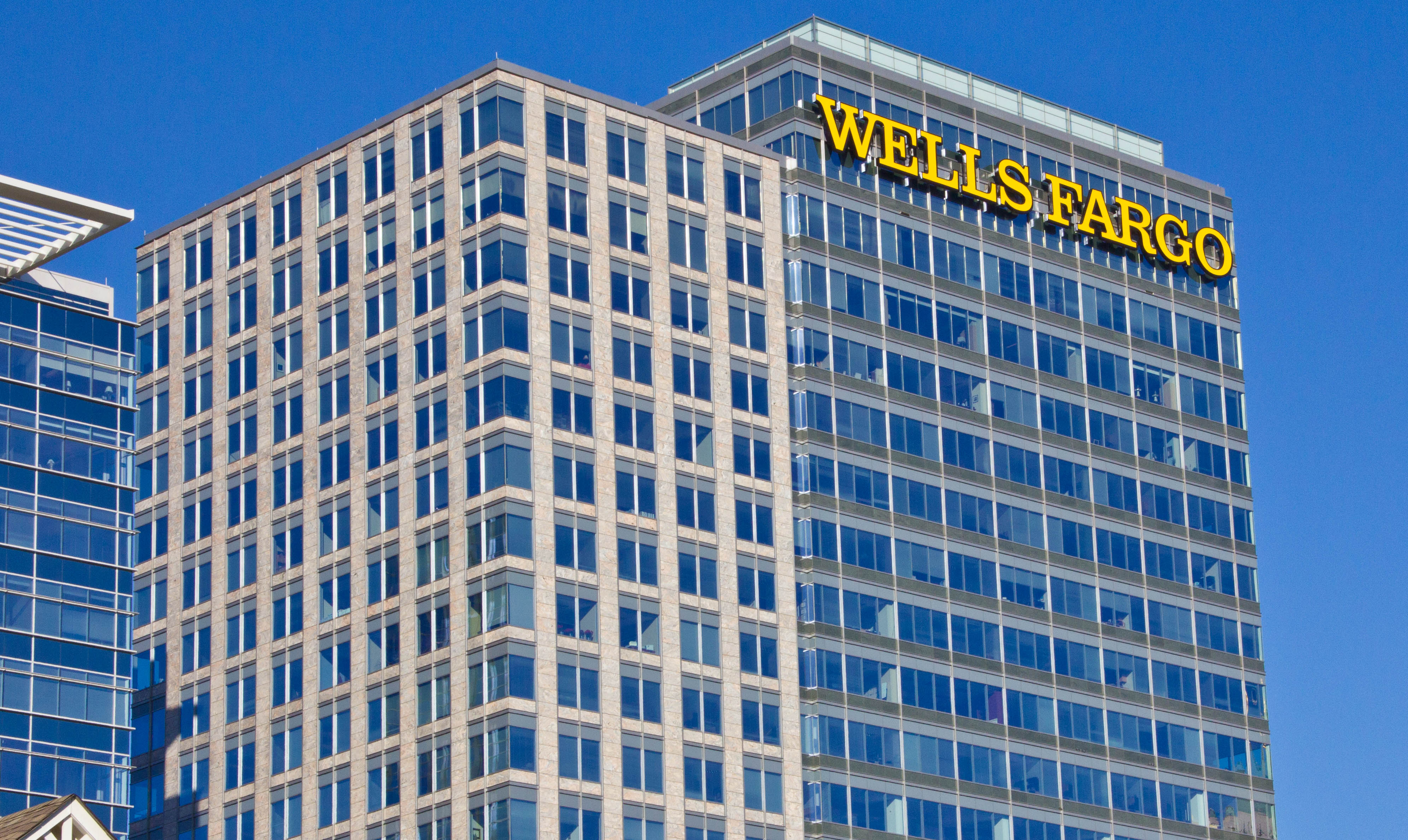
The Wells Fargo signage
