= One Park Tower (Atlanta) =

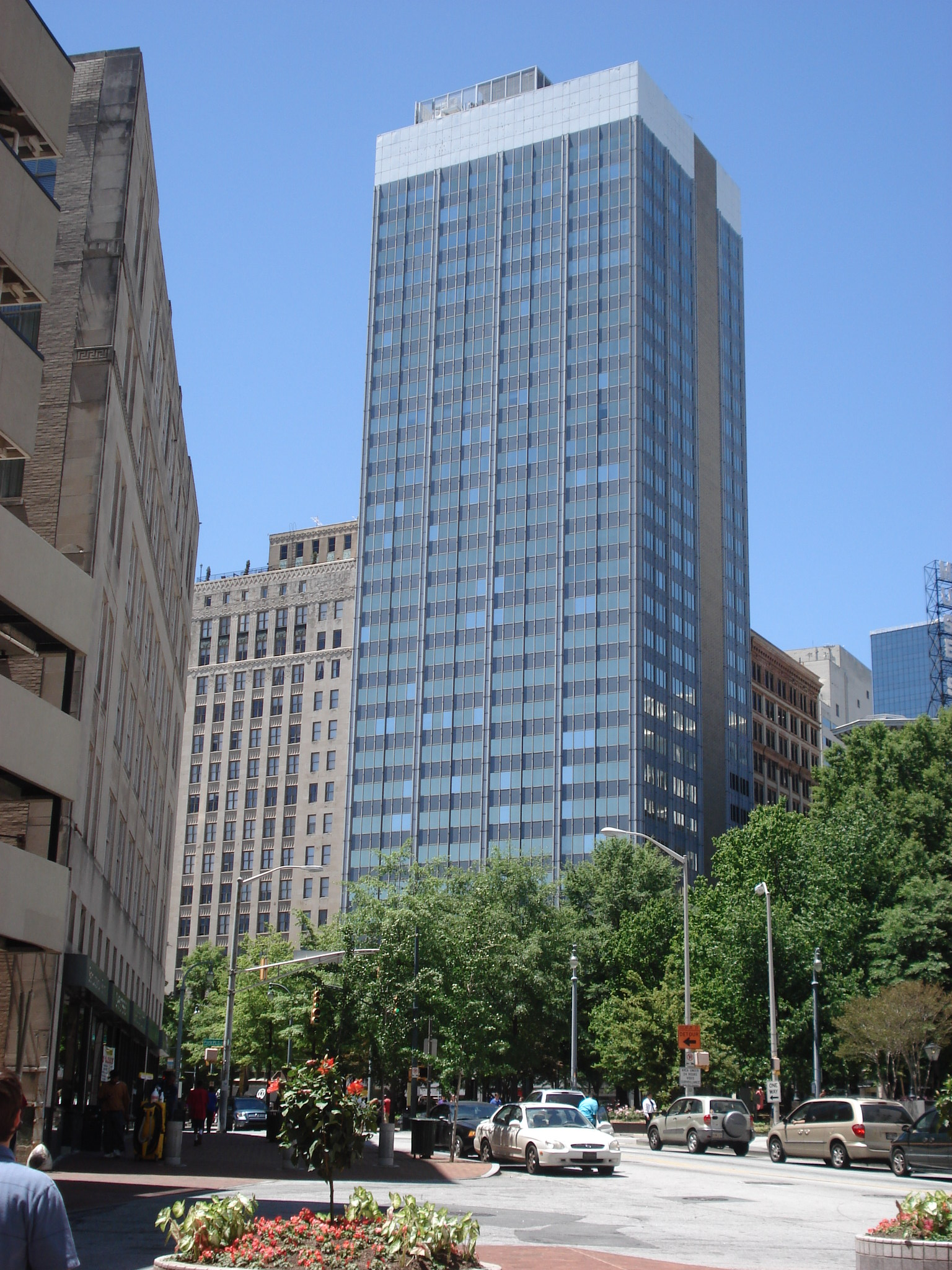
- One Park Tower in 2007
- Interactive map of the One Park Tower area
- Alternative names: 34 Peachtree Street; National Bank of Georgia; Southtrust Building; Bank Of Georgia Building; First American Bank

General information
- Type: Commercial offices
- Location: 34 Peachtree Street; Atlanta, Georgia
- Coordinates: 33.7547°N 84.3894°W
- Completed: 1961

Height
- Roof: 133.81 m (439.0 ft)

Technical details
- Floor count: 32
- Floor area: 282,200 sq ft (26,220 m^{2})

One Park Tower, alternately referenced as 34 Peachtree Street is a 134 m (440 ft) class-B office building skyscraper in Atlanta, Georgia. It was completed in 1961 and has 32 floors. It is the 24th tallest building in Atlanta, and was the tallest until it was passed by 2 Peachtree Street in 1966.

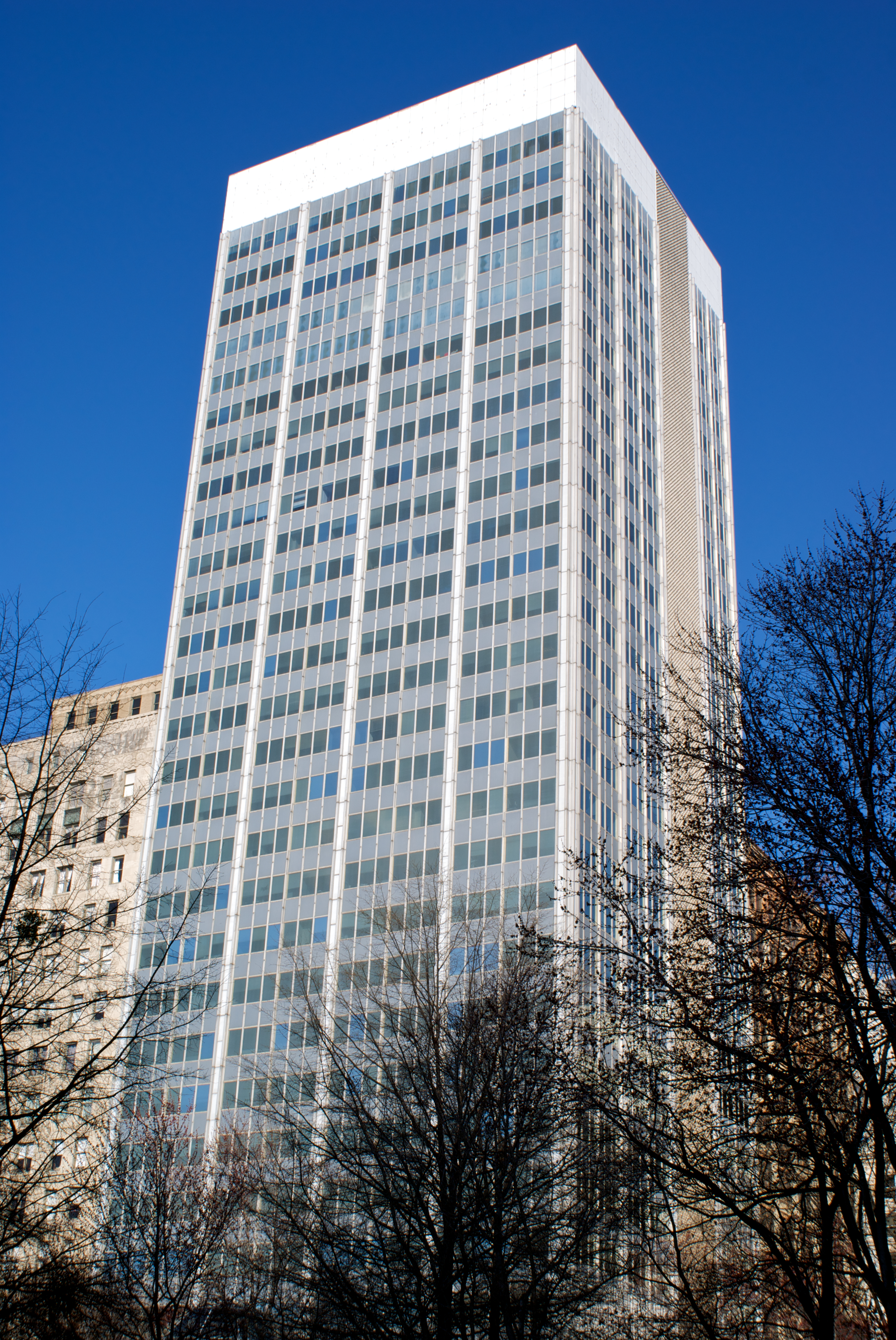
34 Peachtree viewed from the east

== See also ==
- List of tallest buildings in Atlanta
