= The Atlantic (Atlanta) =

Residential skyscraper in Atlanta, Georgia

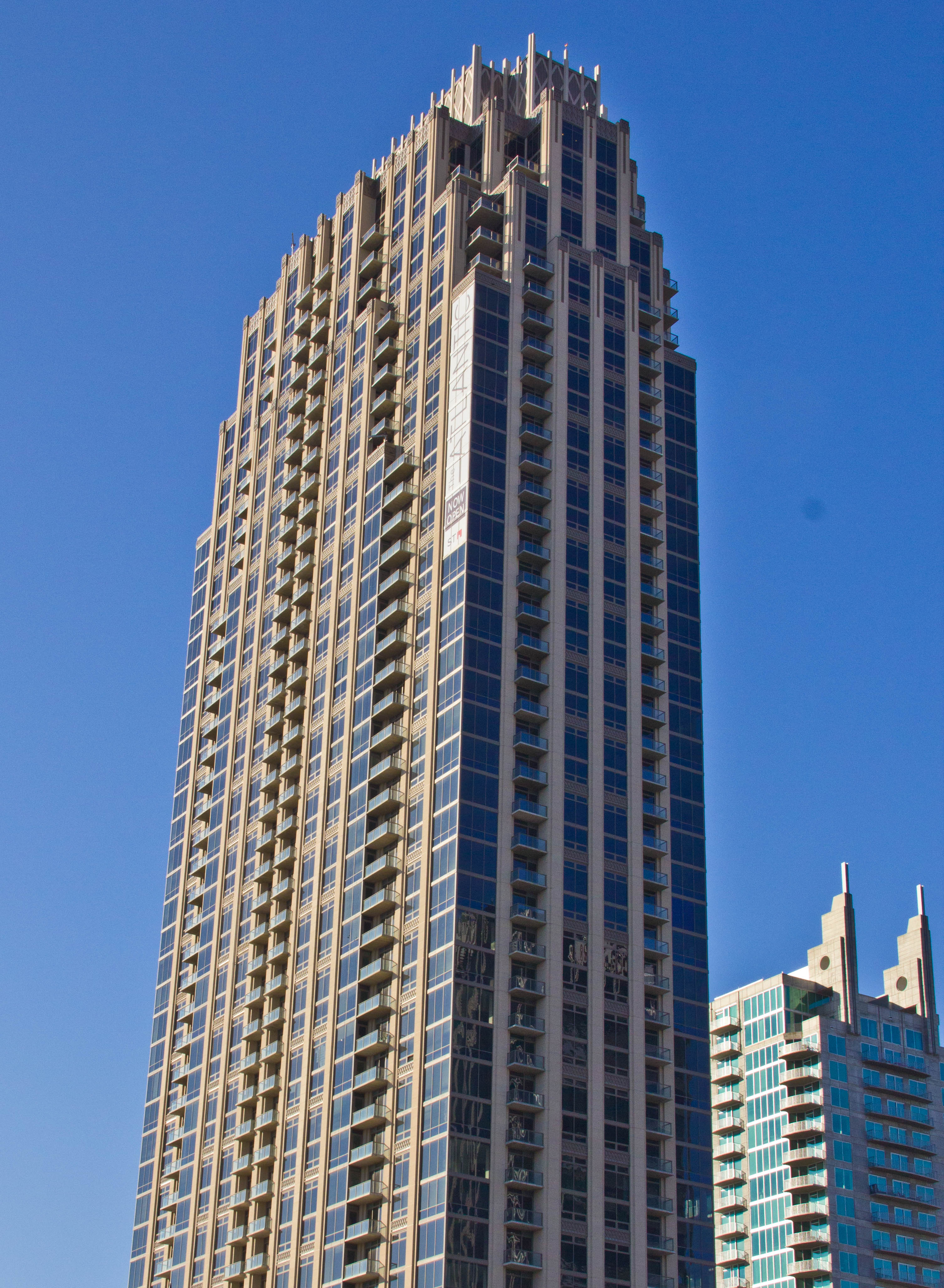
- The Atlantic in 2010
- Interactive map of the The Atlantic area

General information
- Location: 270 17th Street NW; Atlanta, GA 30363
- Coordinates: 33°47′27″N 84°23′51″W
- Construction started: March 21, 2007
- Completed: 2009

Height
- Roof: 577 ft (176 m)

Technical details
- Floor count: 46

Design and construction
- Architects: Smallwood, Reynolds, Stewart, Stewart & Associates and Brooks Hall
- Developer: The Novare Group
- Main contractor: RJ Griffin & Company

Website
- ownatlantic.com

The Atlantic is a mixed-use residential skyscraper in the Atlantic Station neighborhood of Atlanta, Georgia. At 577 ft (176 m) tall, it is the thirteenth-tallest building in Atlanta. Located at the southeastern corner of 17th Street NW and State Street NW, The Atlantic is one of the core structures of the award-winning brownfield development.

== History ==
Construction on The Atlantic began on March 21, 2007, with a groundbreaking ceremony by its developers, The Novare Group. By April 2009, the building had been topped-out, with only interior work to be finished before it opened later in the year.

== Design ==
The Atlantic is designed in the Art Deco style of the 1930s, with an ornamental roof lined with spikes and turrets built by local ornamental metals fabricator Henry Incorporated. At 46 stories tall, the building contains 401 suites for residential use up to 3,172 sq ft (295 m^{2}) in area. Sl
