= Buckhead Grand =

Building in Atlanta, Georgia, United States

Coordinates: 33.848793°N 84.370816°W

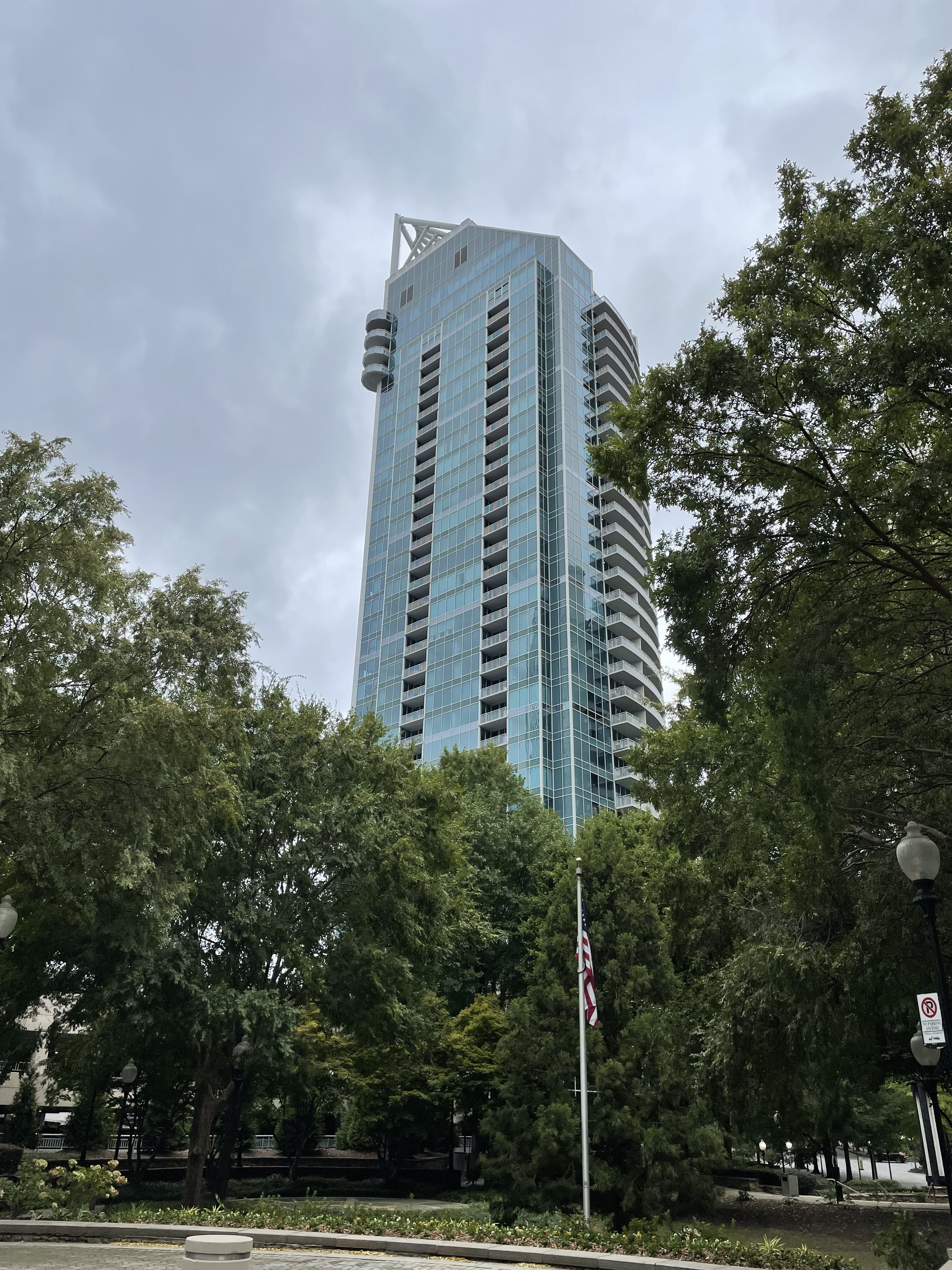

The Buckhead Grand building is a 137.5-meter (451.115-feet) tall skyscraper in Buckhead, Atlanta, Georgia. The 36-story residential building, designed by Smallwood, Reynolds, Stewart, Stewart & Associates, Inc., was constructed starting in 2003 and finishing in mid-2004. This highrise was built with 286 residential units ranging in size from 900 square feet (84 m^{2}) to 3,000 square feet (280 m^{2}).

== Education ==
The building is zoned to North Atlanta High School of the Atlanta Public Schools.
