= One Georgia Center =

Skyscraper in Atlanta

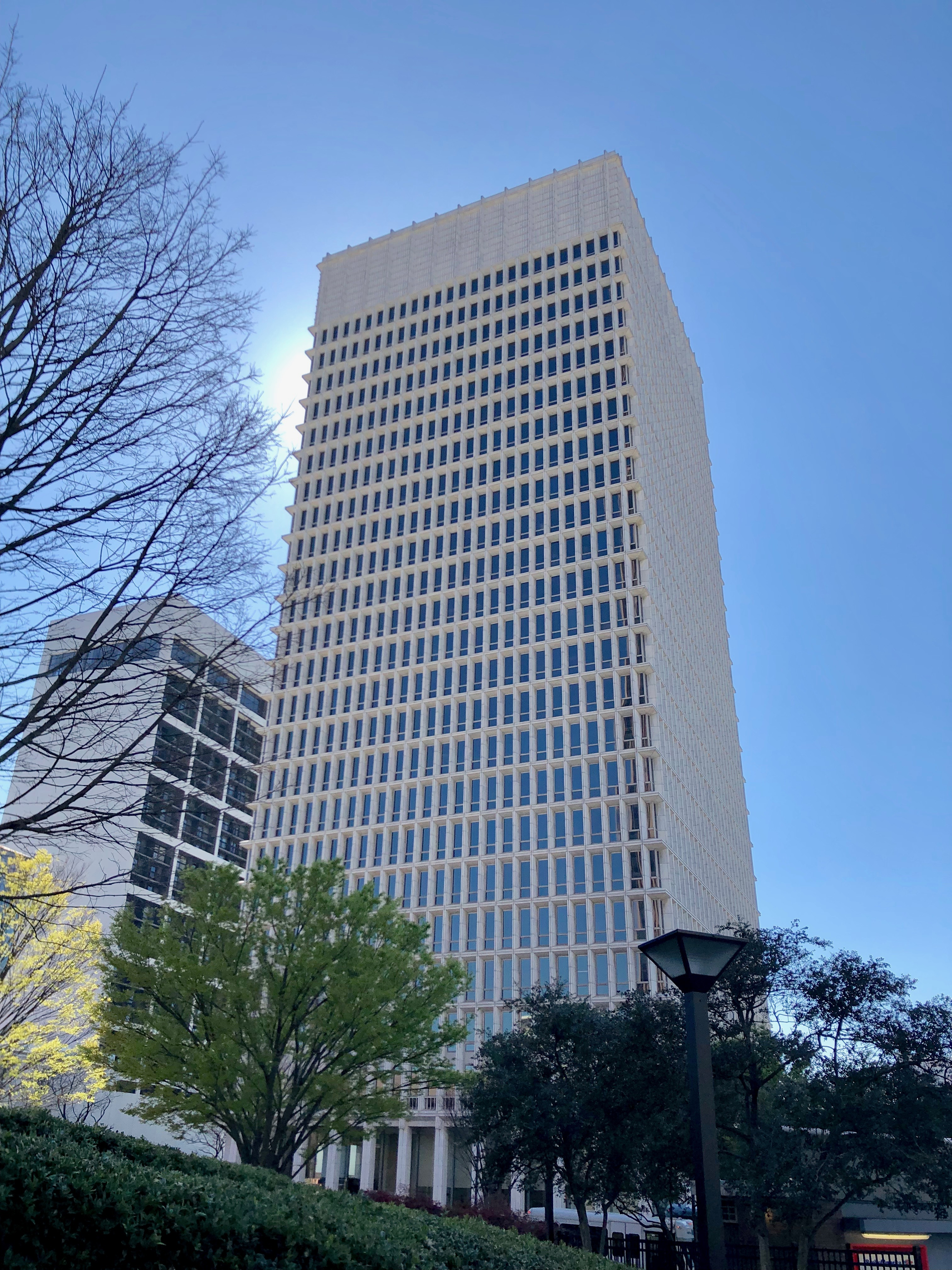
- One Georgia Center (2019)

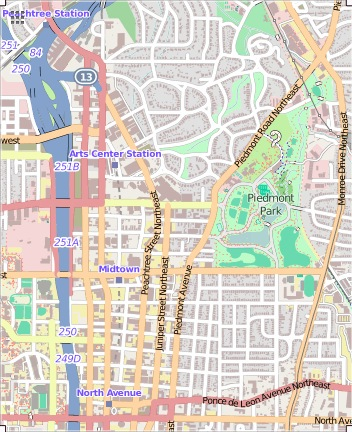
- Location within Atlanta Midtown One Georgia Center (Atlanta) One Georgia Center (Georgia) One Georgia Center (the United States)
- Alternative names: Life of Georgia Building

General information
- Status: Completed
- Type: Office
- Architectural style: International
- Location: 600 West Peachtree Street, NW; Atlanta, Georgia 30308
- Coordinates: 33°46′15″N 84°23′16″W
- Completed: 1968

Height
- Height: 371 ft (113 m)

Technical details
- Floor count: 24
- Lifts/elevators: 10

Design and construction
- Architecture firm: Bodin & Lamberson
- Main contractor: Cousins Properties

One Georgia Center (formerly known as the Life of Georgia Building) is a skyscraper in SoNo, Atlanta, at the intersection of West Peachtree Street and North Avenue. Completed in 1968, the 24-story building is notable for its Georgia marble exterior.

== History ==
One Georgia Center was completed in 1968, originally as the headquarters for the Life of Georgia Insurance Company. The building was designed by renowned Atlanta based architectural firm Bodin & Lamberson and built by Atlanta legend Cousins Properties. While initially planned as a 29-story building, upon completion the building topped out at 24 stories, with a construction cost of $13.5 million. Originally, the building was capped by a large sign for Life of Georgia, which was removed upon its namesake company's departure from the building in 1985. According to the American Institute of Architects, the building is notable for being one of the first skyscrapers built in Atlanta outside of downtown Atlanta, precipitating a steady growth in midtown Atlanta's skyline. In 2008, the Georgia Department of Transportation moved its headquarters to the building from its long-time location next to the Georgia State Capitol in an effort to upgrade its office space. In 2011, Cousins Properties sold the building for $48.6 million.
