= Peachtree Summit =

Skyscraper in Atlanta, Georgia

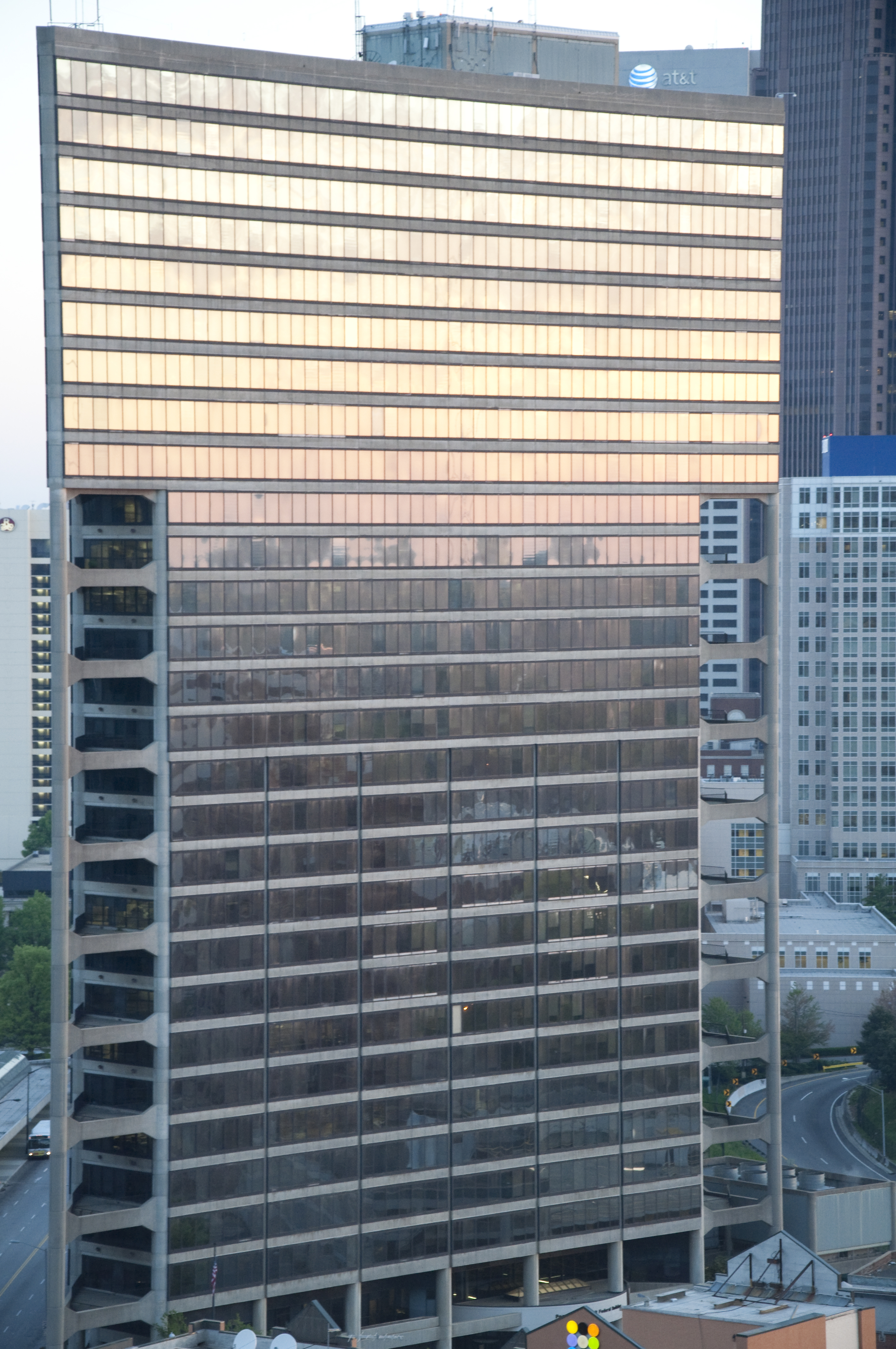
- Peachtree Summit in 2010
- Interactive map of the Peachtree Summit area
- Alternative names: Peachtree Summit One; Peachtree Summit #1; Federal Building

General information
- Type: Commercial offices Government offices
- Location: 401 West Peachtree Street NW; Atlanta, Georgia
- Coordinates: 33.7653°N 84.38707°W
- Construction started: 1974
- Completed: 1975

Height
- Roof: 125 m (410 ft)

Technical details
- Floor count: 30 (no 13th floor)

Design and construction
- Architect: Toombs, Amisano and Wells

Peachtree Summit is a 125 m (410 ft), 30-story skyscraper in downtown Atlanta, Georgia. Completed in 1975, Peachtree Summit is shaped like a triangle due to the unusual shape of its building lot, which is hemmed in by the Downtown Connector, West Peachtree Street, and Ivan Allen Jr. Boulevard. The building has a direct connection to the Civic Center MARTA station and was built with a three-story lobby to account for the late 1970s elevation of West Peachtree Street for MARTA construction. This building was planned as the first of three similar buildings for the area, of which only this one was constructed.

In 2025, this building was added as a building GSA identified as an “accelerated disposition."

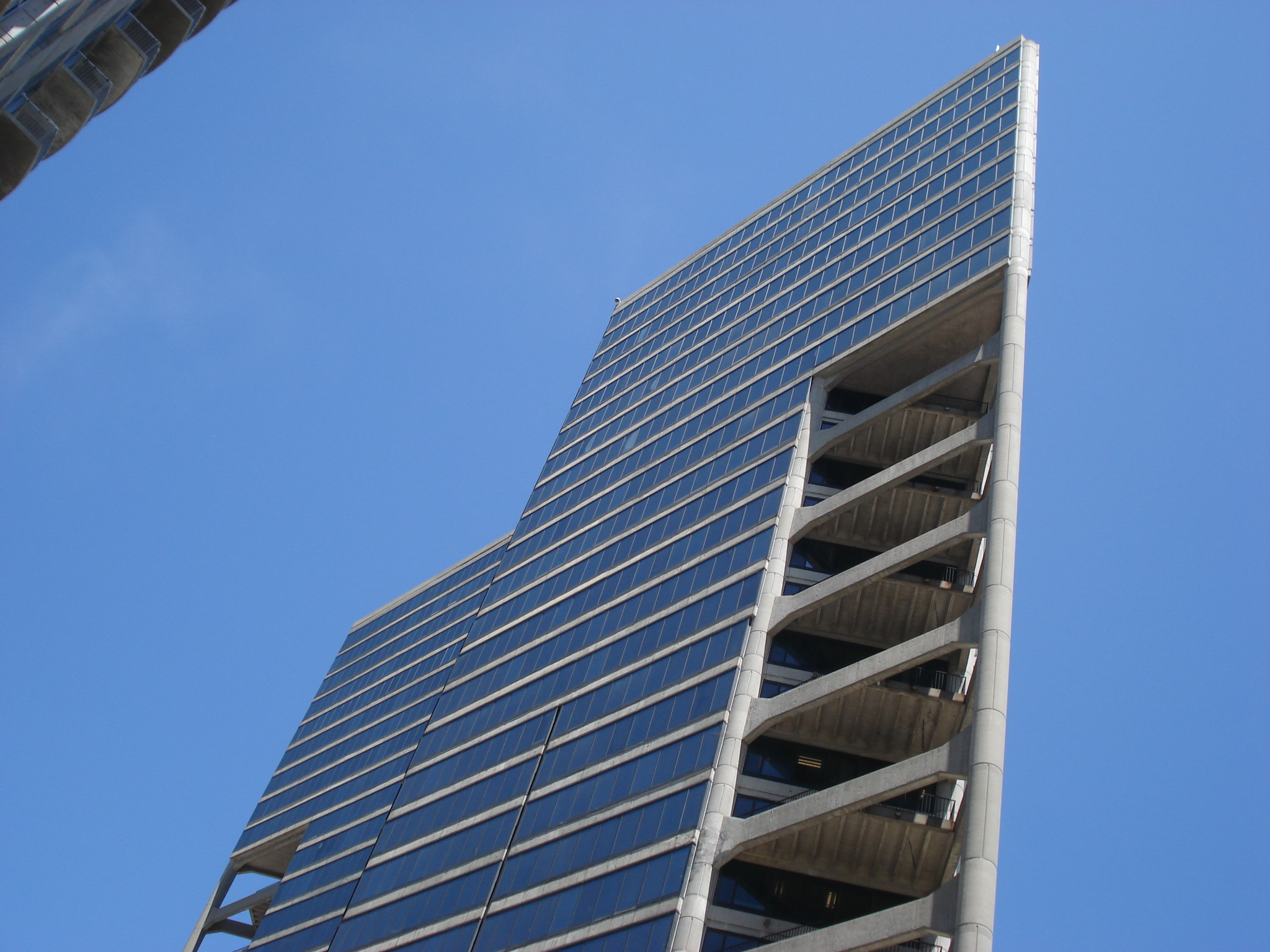

== See also ==
- List of tallest buildings in Atlanta
