= Hotels in Atlanta =

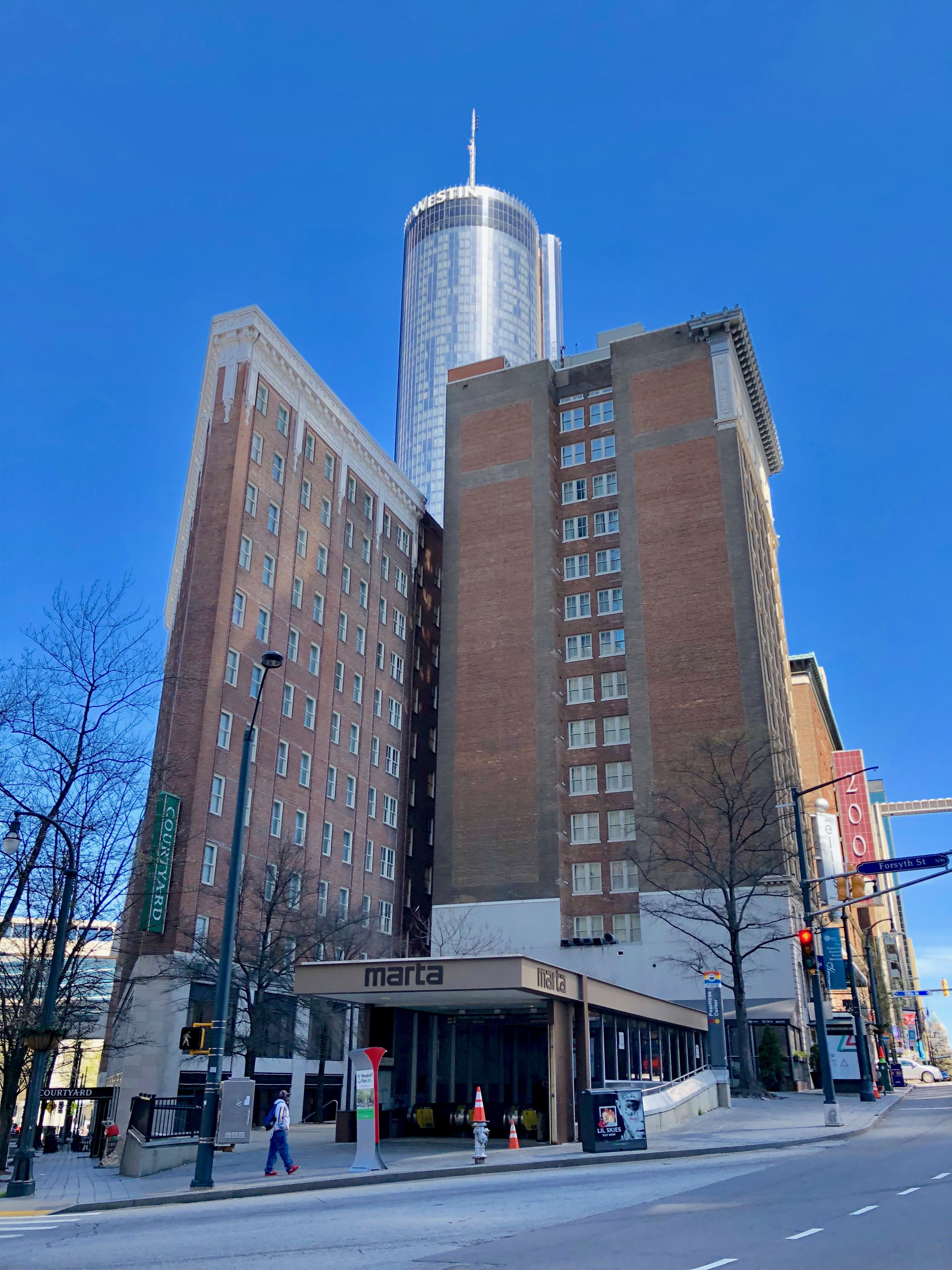
Three hotels in downtown Atlanta. Clockwise from top: Westin Peachtree Plaza Hotel, Ellis Hotel, Carnegie Building

Founded in the 1830s as a railroad terminus, Atlanta experienced rapid growth in its early years to become a major economic center of Georgia, with several hotels built to accommodate for this growth. Following its destruction during the Civil War, Atlanta experienced a resurgence and another hotel boom commenced in the late 1800s through the early 1900s. In the latter half of the 20th century, hotel skyscrapers began to appear on the skyline, including what was at the time the tallest hotel in the United States. Later, a trend emerged of converting old office buildings into boutique hotels.

== History ==
=== Early history through the early 20th century ===
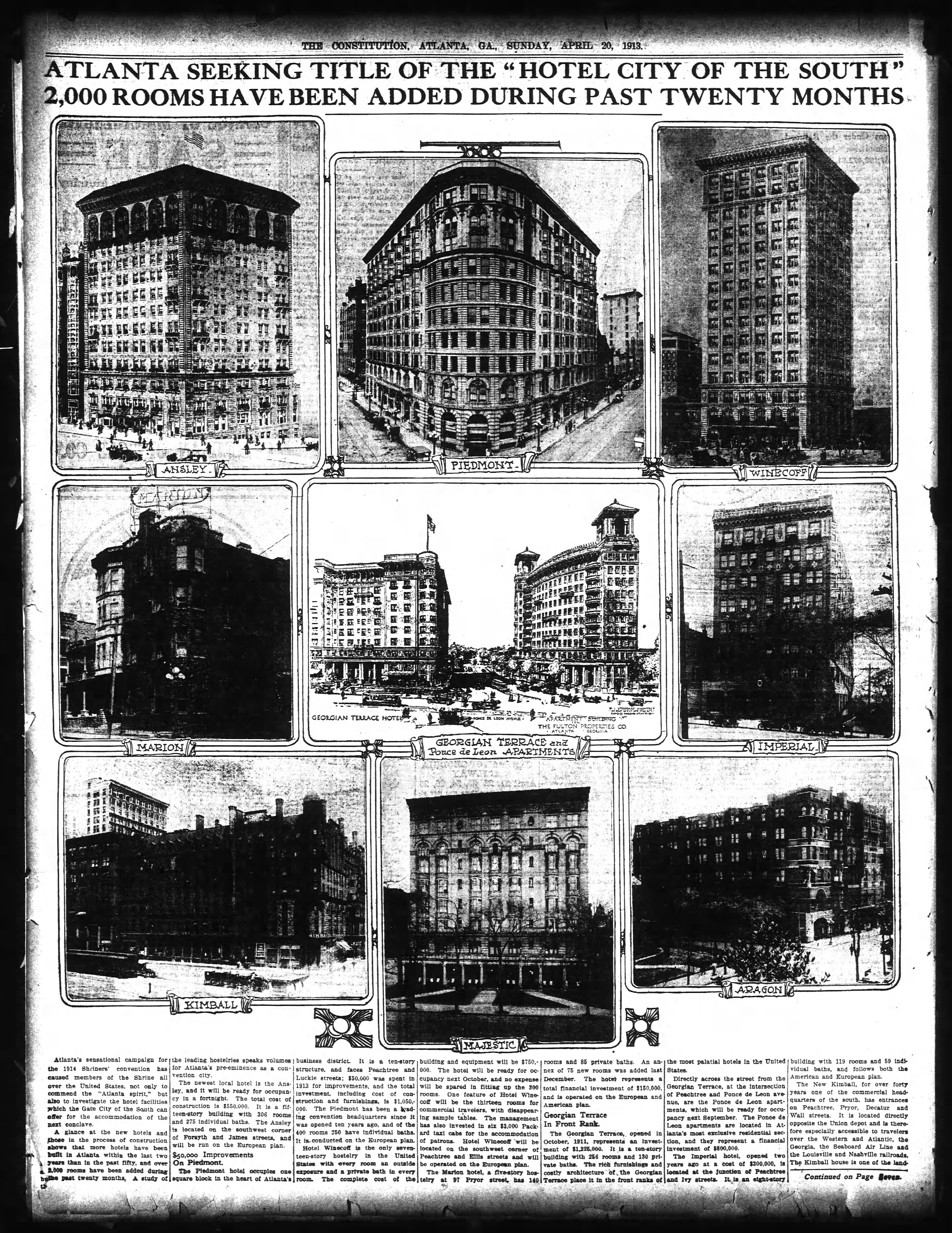
Atlanta Constitution article from 1913 describing some of the hotels in the city

The White Hall Inn, located in present-day West End, Atlanta, is generally considered to be one of the first hotels in the area, predating the founding of the city by several years and laying outside the original city limits. As the area's population began to grow following its establishment as a terminus for the Western and Atlantic Railroad in 1837, several hotels arose to service visitors to the city. The first hotel built within city limits came in 1846 with the construction of the Atlanta Hotel. It was joined later that year by Washington Hall. Several more hotels would follow, including the Trout House in 1849. However, these buildings, as well as many other Antebellum era buildings in the city, were destroyed during the Burning of Atlanta, a significant event preceding Sherman's March to the Sea during the American Civil War.

Following the war, Atlanta rebounded and began to rebuild at a rapid pace. New hotels arose to replace those lost during the war, including the Kimball House (1870) and the Markham House (1875). While many of the hotels before and after the war were built around State Square in downtown Atlanta, by the 1890s many of the newer hotels were being built north of the area along "upper Peachtree". Some of these notable buildings included the Majestic Hotel (1898) and the Piedmont Hotel (1903). Also starting around this time, several hotels opened on Hotel Row near the newly opened Terminal Station in South Downtown. Among these was the Terminal Hotel, built in 1906 by prominent Atlanta businessman Samuel M. Inman. However, stiff competition from other hotels in downtown caused the area to experience a decline a few decades later.

=== Mid-20th century ===
Atlanta was home to the deadliest hotel fire in United States when a fire broke out in the Winecoff Hotel on December 7, 1946. In the ensuing disaster, 119 people died. This event contributed to massive changes in North American building codes. The Winecoff would remain abandoned for several years before reopening in the 1950s with a changed name. In 1964, the Supreme Court case Heart of Atlanta Motel, Inc. v. United States pertained to a motel in Atlanta and was a landmark case in the Civil rights movement. The owner of the Heart of Atlanta Motel had refused to rent rooms to African American patrons and the case pertained to Title II of the Civil Rights Act of 1964, which prohibited discrimination in public accommodations. The Supreme Court against the motel owner and affirmed the constitutionality of the act.

=== Later 20th century ===
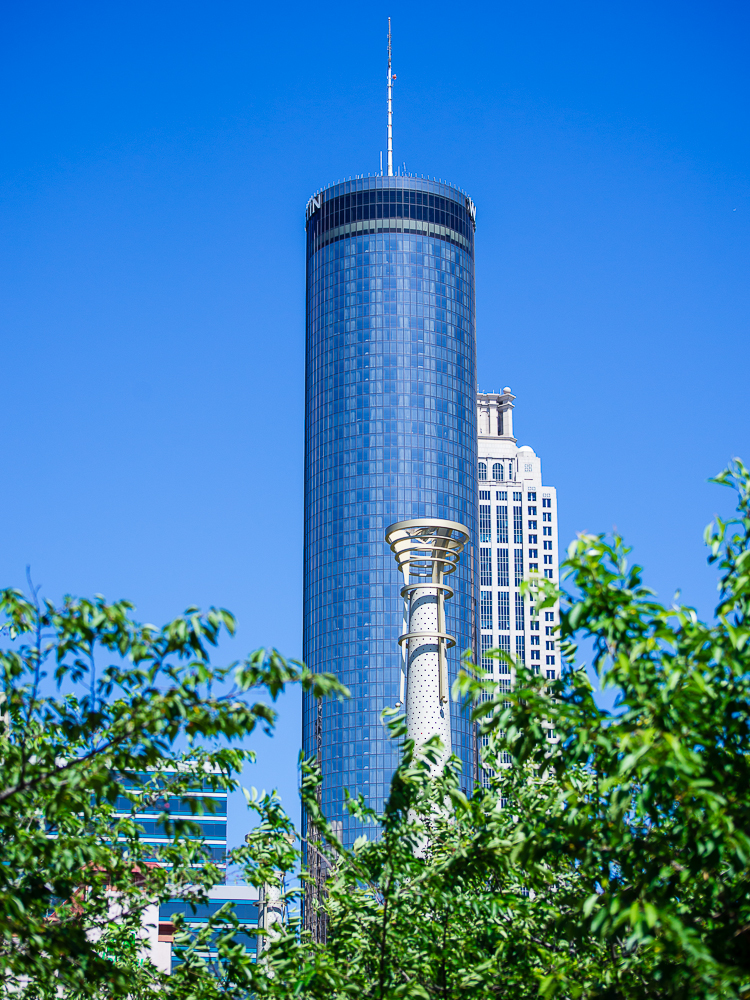
Westin Peachtree Plaza Hotel

The later half of the 20th century saw several skyscraper hotels take shape on the Atlanta skyline. John C. Portman Jr.'s Peachtree Center plan included the construction of multiple high-rise hotels in downtown during the 1970s and 1980s. Arguably the most notable of these was the Westin Peachtree Plaza Hotel. Upon its completion in 1976, the building was the tallest hotel in the world, the tallest building in Atlanta, and the tallest building in the Southeastern United States. Other Portman-designed hotels included the Hyatt Regency Atlanta in 1967 and the Atlanta Marriott Marquis in 1985. The hotels in Peachtree Center, along with others in the surrounding downtown area, constitute the Hotel District neighborhood in downtown Atlanta, named in reference of the numerous hotels in the area.

=== Recent history ===
Since the late 1990s, a trend that has emerged in Atlanta has been the repurposing of old office buildings into boutique hotels. In 1996, the Rhodes-Haverty Building (1929) was converted from office space to a hotel, and it currently houses a Residence Inn by Marriott. Similarly, in the 2010s, the Carnegie Building (1925) and the Candler Building (1906) in downtown Atlanta were converted to hotels. Conversely, some historic hotel buildings have been repurposed for other uses, including office space. Examples of this include the Atlanta Biltmore Hotel (1924), which was repurposed for office use in the 1990s, and the Imperial Hotel (1910), which now serves as low-income housing.

== List of hotels ==
Name	Image	Built	Architect	Notes
Atlanta Hotel		1846		The first hotel to be built within Atlanta's city limits. Destroyed in 1864 during the Burning of Atlanta.
Washington Hall		1846		Built shortly after the Atlanta Hotel. Destroyed in 1864 during the Burning of Atlanta.
Trout House		1849		Confederate President Jefferson Davis gave a speech here in 1861. Destroyed in 1864 during the Burning of Atlanta.
Kimball House		1870	William Parkins	Built on the site of the Atlanta Hotel. Destroyed by a fire in 1883 and rebuilt in 1885. Razed in 1959.
Markham House		1875		Built by William Markham. Destroyed by fire in 1896.
Hotel Aragon		1892		Demolished in 1930.
Majestic Hotel		1898		Demolished in 1927.
Piedmont Hotel		1903	Willis F. Denny	Underwent renovations in 1928–1929. Demolished in 1965.
Candler Building		1906	George Stewart George E. Murphy	Tallest building in the city at the time of its completion. Designated a National Historic Landmark in 1977. Repurposed in 2016 for use as a boutique hotel.
Terminal Hotel		1906		Built by Samuel M. Inman across from Terminal Station. Part of the Hotel Row district in downtown. Destroyed by fire in 1938.
Imperial Hotel		1910	Edward E. Dougherty R. M. Walker	Abandoned in 1980. Added to the National Register of Historic Places in 1983. Currently serves as low-income housing.
Georgian Terrace Hotel		1911	William Lee Stoddart	Declared a contributing property to the Fox Theatre Historic District in 1978. Underwent renovations in 1991.
Ellis Hotel		1913	William Lee Stoddart	Originally known as the Winecoff Hotel. Site of the 1946 Winecoff Hotel fire. Reopened in 1951 as the Peachtree on Peachtree Hotel. Later served as housing for the elderly. Reopened in 2007 with its current name. Added to the National Register of Historic Places in 2009.
Hotel Ansley		1913	Jerome B. Pound	Renamed the Dinkler Plaza Hotel in 1953. Razed in 1973.
Connally Building		1916	William Lee Stoddart	Originally built as an office building. Converted to a hotel in 1990 following a renovation and the addition of eleven stories. Currently houses a Fairfield by Marriott.
Glenn Building		1923	Wadley B. Wood	Originally built as an office building. Converted to a boutique hotel in 2006. Added to the National Register of Historic Places in 2008.
Atlanta Biltmore Hotel and Biltmore Apartments		1924	Schultze & Weaver	Operated by Sheraton Hotels and Resorts between 1967 and 1979. Added to National Register of Historic Places in 1980. Converted to an office building in 1999.
Briarcliff Hotel		1924	G. Lloyd Preacher	Built by Asa G. Candler Jr. as a luxury apartments and hotel. Originally known as The Seven-Fifty. Added to the National Register of Historic Places in 1982.
Clermont Motor Hotel		1924		Originally built as the Bonaventure Arms Apartments, converted into a hotel in 1939. Famous for the Clermont Lounge, Atlanta's first and oldest strip club, which opened in the 1960s. Renamed Hotel Clermont following renovations in 2018.
Henry Grady Hotel		1924	G. Lloyd Preacher	Named for Henry W. Grady. Demolished in 1972 to make way for the Westin Peachtree Plaza Hotel.
Carnegie Building		1925	G. Lloyd Preacher	Built as the Wynne-Claughton Building, originally served as an office building until its repurposing into a boutique hotel in 2010. Currently houses a Courtyard by Marriott. Added to National Register of Historic Places in 2012.
Hotel Indigo Atlanta Midtown		1925	Francis Palmer Smith	Built as the Carlton Bachelor Apartments and later known as the Cox-Carlton Hotel. Reopened in 2004 as a Hotel Indigo. Added to the National Register of Historic Places in 2006.
Rhodes–Haverty Building		1929	Francis Palmer Smith	Originally built as an office building. Tallest building in Atlanta at the time of its construction. Added to National Register of Historic Places in 1979. Repurposed in the mid-1990s to become a hotel.
Atlanta Cabana Motel		1958	Jay Sarno (developer)	Demolished in 2002.
Hyatt Regency Atlanta		1967	John C. Portman Jr.	Originally known as the Regency Hyatt House. Part of Peachtree Center.
Westin Peachtree Plaza Hotel		1976	John C. Portman Jr.	Tallest hotel in the world and tallest building in Atlanta at the time of its completion. Part of Peachtree Center.
Atlanta Marriott Marquis		1985	John C. Portman Jr.	Largest hotel in Atlanta. Part of Peachtree Center.
Grand Hyatt Atlanta in Buckhead		1990		25-story hotel in Buckhead. Originally built as the Hotel Nikko Atlanta and owned by Nikko Hotels. Purchased by Hyatt in 1997.
Four Seasons Hotel Atlanta		1992	Rabun, Rasche, Rector & Reece, Architects	Located in the GLG Grand. Originally known as the GLG Grand Hotel and later the Occidental Grand Hotel. Became a Four Seasons Hotels and Resorts property in the late 1997.
Waldorf Astoria Atlanta Buckhead		2008	Robert A.M. Stern Architects Milton Pate Architects	Originally known as The Mansion on Peachtree. Renamed The Mandarin Oriental, Atlanta in 2012. Gained its current name in 2018.

== Bibliography ==
- Ariail, Donald L. (2013). Ansley Park. Arcadia Publishing. ISBN 978-1-4671-1000-6 – via Google Books.
- Barnett, Randy E.; Blackman, Josh (2020). An Introduction to Constitutional Law: 100 Supreme Court Cases Everyone Should Know. Wolters Kluwer. ISBN 978-1-5438-1390-6 – via Google Books.
- Blass, Kimberly S.; Rose, Michael (1998). Atlanta Scenes: Photojournalism in the Atlanta History Center Collection. Arcadia Publishing. ISBN 978-0-7385-1549-6 – via Google Books.
- Christian, Reese (2008). Ghosts of Atlanta: Phantoms of the Phoenix City. Arcadia Publishing. ISBN 978-1-62584-369-2 – via Google Books.
- Clanton, Nancy (April 9, 2019). "These 11 sites have been added to Georgia's register of historic places". The Atlanta Journal-Constitution. Cox Enterprises.
- Clayton, Sarah "Sallie" Conley (1999). Davis Jr., Robert Scott (ed.). Requiem for a Lost City: A Memoir of Civil War Atlanta and the Old South. Mercer University Press. ISBN 978-0-86554-622-6 – via Google Books.
- Craig, Robert Michael (1995). Atlanta Architecture: Art Deco to Modern Classic, 1929-1959. Pelican Publishing Company. ISBN 978-1-4556-0044-1 – via Google Books.
- Craig, Robert Michael (2012). The Architecture of Francis Palmer Smith, Atlanta's Scholar-architect. University of Georgia Press. ISBN 978-0-8203-2898-0 – via Google Books.
- Davis, Ren; Davis, Helen (2011). Atlanta Walks: A Comprehensive Guide to Walking, Running, and Bicycling the Area's Scenic and Historic Locales (4th ed.). Peachtree Publishers. ISBN 978-1-56145-644-4 – via Google Books.
- Diamond, Laura (June 13, 2016). "Georgia Tech Acquires Historic Biltmore". Georgia Tech News Center. Georgia Tech.
- Felton, Carly, ed. (2008). A Marmac Guide to Atlanta. Pelican Publishing Company. ISBN 978-1-4556-0846-1 – via Google Books.
- Galloway, Tammy Harden (2002). The Inman Family: An Atlanta Family from Reconstruction to World War I. Mercer University Press. ISBN 978-0-86554-755-1 – via Google Books.
- Garrett, Franklin M. (1969a). Atlanta and Environs: A Chronicle of Its People and Events, 1820s-1870s. Vol. I. University of Georgia Press. ISBN 978-0-8203-3903-0 – via Google Books.
- Garrett, Franklin M. (1969b). Atlanta and Environs: A Chronicle of Its People and Events, 1880s-1930s. Vol. II. University of Georgia Press. ISBN 978-0-8203-3904-7 – via Google Books.
- Godwin, Becca J. G. (December 13, 2018). "Mandarin Oriental Atlanta no more: The hotel is now a Waldorf Astoria". The Atlanta Journal-Constitution. Cox Enterprises.
- Gournay, Isabelle (1993). Sams, Gerald W. (ed.). AIA Guide to the Architecture of Atlanta. University of Georgia Press. ISBN 978-0-8203-1450-1 – via Google Books.
- Henry, Scott (February 14, 2017). "Razed in Atlanta: 6 great buildings we lost". Atlanta.
- Hickel, Jan; Botha, Candace T. (2003). Buckhead: Atlanta's First Address. Indigo Custom Publishing. ISBN 978-0-9725951-0-0 – via Google Books.
- Hillyer, Reiko (2015). Designing Dixie: Tourism, Memory, and Urban Space in the New South. University of Virginia Press. ISBN 978-0-8139-3671-0 – via Google Books.
- "Fairfield Inn & Suites Downtown Atlanta completes $4M overhaul". Hotel Management. Questex. April 9, 2013.
- Jones, Sharon Foster (2012). Atlanta's Ponce de Leon Avenue: A History. Arcadia Publishing. ISBN 978-1-61423-468-5 – via Google Books.
- Kahn, Michael (January 9, 2018). "Historic Candler Building's conversion to downtown hotel is back underway". Curbed. Vox Media. Archived from the original on September 21, 2019.
- Kelly, Dane Sager (February 2, 2019). "What's with the small Renaissance Center in Atlanta?". WDIV-TV. Graham Media Group.
- Kincaid, Adam (July 17, 2018). "First look: Here's everything to know about the all-new Hotel Clermont". The Atlanta Journal-Constitution. Cox Enterprises.
- Kurtz, Wilbur G.; Kurtz, Annie Laurie (Spring 1982). Stegeman, John F. (ed.). "The Kurtz Chronicles of Early Atlanta". Atlanta Historical Journal. XXVI (1). Atlanta Historical Society: 5–32 – via Atlanta History Center.
- Lee, Conor (August 6, 2013). "The Imperial Hotel". History Atlanta.
- Martin, Harold H. (1987). Atlanta and Environs: A Chronicle of Its People and Events, 1940s-1970s. Vol. III. University of Georgia Press. ISBN 978-0-8203-3906-1 – via Google Books.
- Martin, Thomas H. (1902). Atlanta and Its Builders: A Comprehensive History of the Gate City of the South. Vol. I. Century Memorial Publishing Company – via Google Books.
- Morrison, Jeffrey (2019). Atlanta Underground: History from Below. Rowman & Littlefield. ISBN 978-1-4930-4371-2 – via Google Books.
- Reed, Wallace P., ed. (1889). History of Atlanta, Georgia: With Illustrations and Biographical Sketches of Some of Its Prominent Men and Pioneers. D. Mason & Company. ISBN 9780722208724 – via Google Books.
- Rice, Charles (2016). Interior Urbanism: Architecture, John Portman and Downtown America. Bloomsbury Publishing. ISBN 978-1-4725-8121-1 – via Google Books.
- Schoolcraft, Lisa R. (February 1, 2010). "Indigo tucks in economic blues". Atlanta Business Chronicle. American City Business Journals.
- Seward, Christopher (November 22, 2013). "Firm controlled by Bill Gates buying Four Seasons Hotel Atlanta". The Atlanta Journal-Constitution. Cox Enterprises.
- Stafford, Leon (March 11, 2016). "Hotels find prime locations in old offices". The Atlanta Journal-Constitution. Cox Enterprises.
- Stafford, Leon (May 23, 2019). "Historic Candler Building begins new life as boutique hotel in July". The Atlanta Journal-Constitution. Cox Enterprises.
- Steffen, Charles (November 11, 2010). "Sad lesson in Imperial Hotel's foreclosure". The Atlanta Journal-Constitution. Cox Enterprises.
- Taylor, Boyd (January 1930). "Record Business Building Year for Atlanta in 1930". The Atlanta City Builder. Atlanta Chamber of Commerce: 3 – via Atlanta History Center.
- Thalimer, Carol; Thalimer, Dan (2008). Explorer's Guide Atlanta: A Great Destination. The Countryman Press. ISBN 978-1-58157-086-1 – via Google Books.
- "TWO ATLANTA FIREMEN KILLED.; The Markham Honse Burned -- Loss About Half a million". The New York Times. May 17, 1896. ISSN 0362-4331.
- Pioneer Citizens' History of Atlanta, 1833-1902. Atlanta: The Pioneer Citizens' Society of Atlanta. 1902 – via Google Books.
- Trubey, J. Scott (June 13, 2016). "Georgia Tech Foundation to buy Midtown's landmark Biltmore". The Atlanta Journal-Constitution. Cox Enterprises.
- Yamanouchi, Kelly (April 6, 2017). "New Renaissance hotel to open near Atlanta airport". The Atlanta Journal-Constitution. Cox Enterprises.
- Zimmerman, Elena Irish (1999). Atlanta in Vintage Postcards. Vol. I. Arcadia Publishing. ISBN 978-0-7385-0039-3 – via Google Books.
