= Piedmont Hotel =

Historic building in Atlanta, Georgia, U.S.

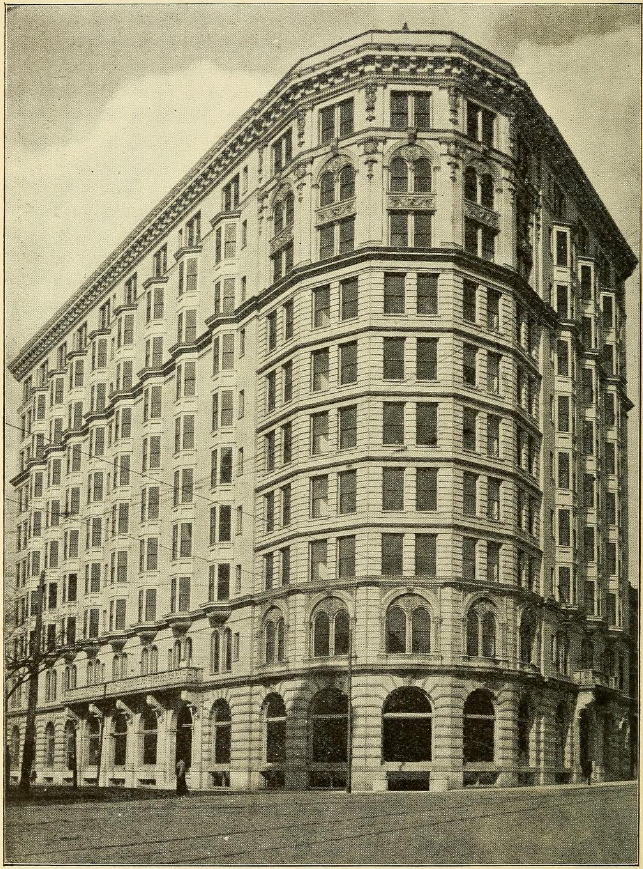
- The Piedmont Hotel in 1907
- Interactive map of the Piedmont Hotel area

General information
- Location: 116 Peachtree Street NE, Atlanta, Georgia, United States
- Coordinates: 33°45′24″N 84°23′19″W
- Construction started: 1901
- Completed: 1903
- Opened: January 15, 1903
- Renovated: 1929
- Closed: May 3, 1965
- Demolished: 1965

Technical details
- Floor count: 11

Design and construction
- Architect: Willis F. Denny

Renovating team
- Architect: Pringle & Smith

The Piedmont Hotel was a hotel in Downtown Atlanta, Georgia, United States. Construction on the building, which was designed by architect Willis F. Denny, began in 1901, and the building was opened to the public in January 1903. Considered one of the finest hotels in the city at the time, numerous famous guests stayed at the hotel while visiting Atlanta, including three presidents of the United States. Unlike other Atlanta hotels, the Piedmont sought to emulate the style of hotels in the northeastern United States and was commonly referred to by locals as "our New York City hotel". In 1929, the building went through an extensive renovation overseen by the architectural firm of Pringle & Smith. In 1965, the owners of the hotel agreed to sell the property to the Equitable Life Assurance Society of the United States, who planned to build a new office building on the site. The hotel was demolished that year and in 1968, the Equitable Building was completed.

== History ==
=== Background and construction ===
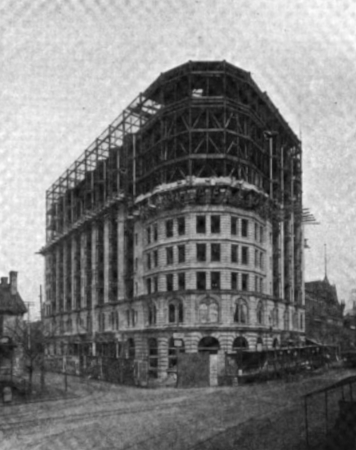
The hotel under construction in March 1902

During the latter half of the 19th century, the land in downtown Atlanta that the hotel would be built on was primarily residential. In the 1850s, William Ezzard, who would later serve multiple terms as mayor of Atlanta, had a two-story brick house built on that city block and lived there until selling the property in 1880. On August 3, 1901, the Piedmont Hotel Company spent $125,000 in purchasing the city block from the multiple owners who owned the individual land lots, which included politician M. Hoke Smith. At this time, the area was still residential, though there were two other hotels that had been built in the area: the Hotel Aragon in 1892 and the Majestic Hotel in 1898. Atlanta's main center for development had been located south of this area, at Five Points, although by the early 20th century, this area had grown congested and new developments began to spread northwards along Peachtree Street. Hotel construction followed this trend, as new hotels built in the early 1900s such as the Georgian Terrace Hotel and the Biltmore Hotel were located further from the city's Union Station than hotels that had been built in the 1800s.

Construction on the Piedmont Hotel commenced in mid-1901. The building was designed by Willis F. Denny, an Atlanta-based architect who designed several other notable buildings in the city, such as St. Mark United Methodist Church and Rhodes Hall. Construction on the hotel lasted through 1902, and it opened to the public at noon on January 15, 1903. The opening was a big event for the city, as thousands of people gathered to see the hotel's interior and prompting the Atlanta chief of police to dispatch officers to keep order. That afternoon, The Atlanta Journal published a front page story on the opening, calling the hotel "the handsomest and most complete in the South". While other hotels in the city, such as the Kimball House, had a reputation as institutions that maintained Southern customs, such as in the Southern cuisine offered in their eateries, the Piedmont instead sought to emulate the style of the hotels in the northeastern United States. One way in which the Piedmont differed from other local hotels was that their staff of bellhops and chambermaids consisted entirely of white Americans, unlike in other hotels which often employed African Americans in those positions. According to historian Franklin Garrett, the hotel was often referred to by locals as "our New York City hotel". In 1906, Atlanta's first storefront theater, a nickelodeon called the Peachtree Theatorium, opened in the hotel's lobby. The following year, a guide book called the Piedmont the largest hotel in the city.

=== Popularity and renovation ===
In its early years, the hotel was host to numerous notable guests. Until the Georgian Terrace was completed in 1912, the Piedmont was the hotel of choice for visiting opera stars. During one week in March 1911, the hotel hosted former United States President Theodore Roosevelt, current President William Howard Taft, and future president and then-Governor of New Jersey Woodrow Wilson, who were in Atlanta for the Southern Commercial Congress. In the 1920s, Margaret Mitchell interviewed inventor Hudson Maxim at his room at the Piedmont for a story published by The Atlanta Journal. Other notable individuals who stayed at the hotel include United States Vice President Thomas R. Marshall, politician William Jennings Bryan, United States Army General Leonard Wood, business magnate J. Ogden Armour, racing driver Barney Oldfield, and writer Thomas Dixon Jr. In 1921, representatives from 14 universities in the southern United States met at the hotel to establish the Southern Conference. Going into that decade, the property had a tax assessment of $977,500, and it boasted 400 rooms, of which 250 had private baths. However, by the middle of the decade, the Piedmont saw a decline in popularity, and between 1928 and 1929, the hotel was closed for a massive renovation. This was carried out by the Atlanta-based architectural firm of Pringle & Smith and commenced on January 1, 1929. As part of the project, almost the entire building except for the structural frame was stripped and rebuilt. As a result of the renovation, much of the building's ground floor frontage was converted to commercial use, with several shops added to the building's lobby. The total cost for the renovation was $750,000. In 1932, Georgia politician Charles R. Crisp based his headquarters at the hotel during his unsuccessful bid in the that year's Senate elections.

=== Closing and demolition ===
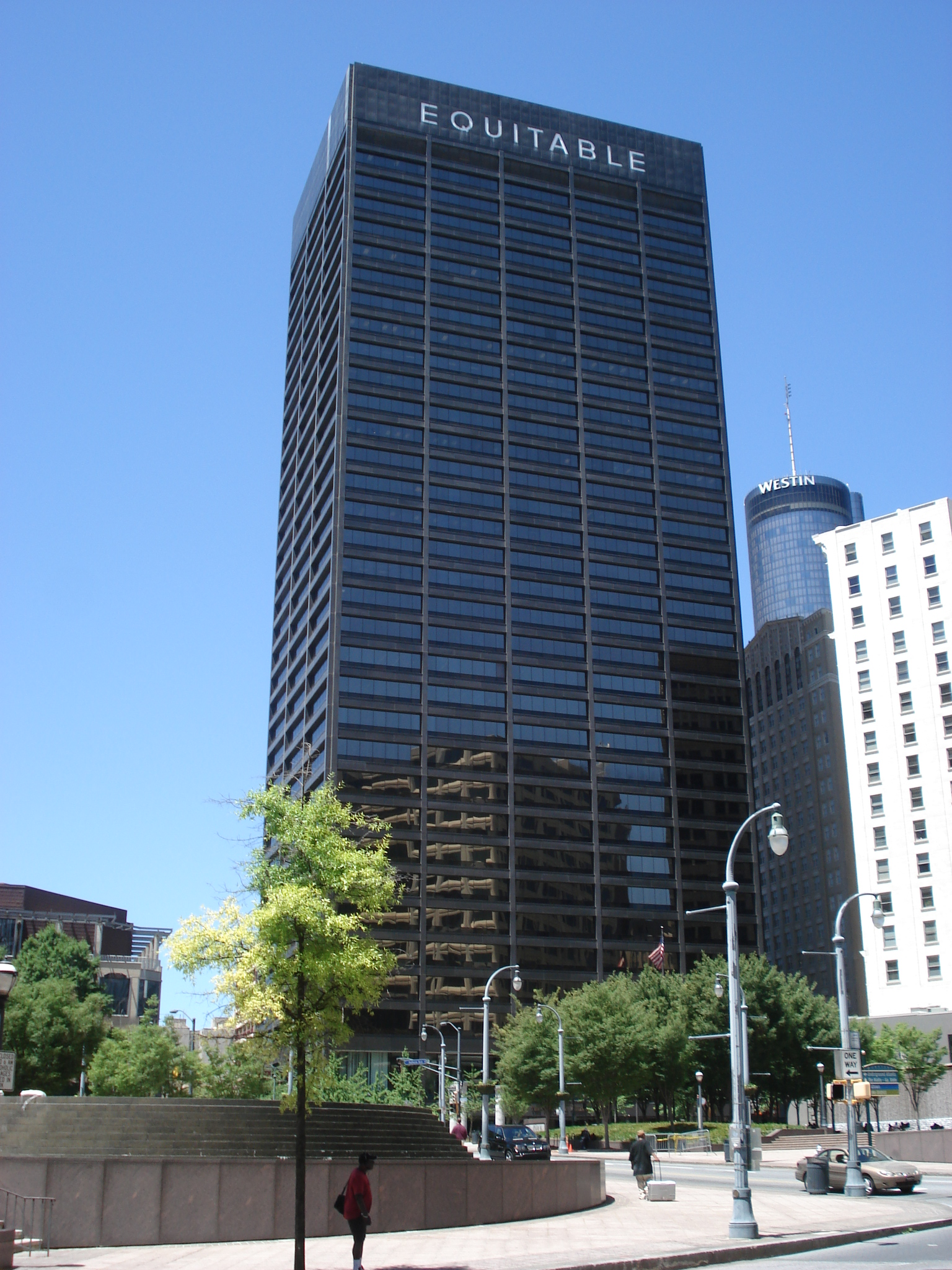
The Equitable Building was constructed on the site of the hotel.

On March 2, 1965, the stockholders of the Piedmont Hotel Company announced that they had accepted a $3.5 million offer from the Equitable Life Assurance Society of the United States to purchase the property, where they intended to construct a new office building. This was part of a larger trend of insurance companies building offices in Atlanta, as between 1960 and 1965, several major insurance firms had either constructed or had plans to construct a collective 135 floors-worth of office space in the city. The hotel closed without fanfare at noon on May 3, 1965. The following day, The Atlanta Constitution published an editorial about the hotel, commending it for its high quality and saying in part about its demolition, "It is with regret that we see an old friend, the Piedmont, depart". The building was demolished that year, and by 1968, the Equitable Building, a 34-floor skyscraper that had cost $20 million to erect, was completed.

== Design ==
The hotel occupied a city block that was bounded by Peachtree Street, Luckie Street, Forsyth Street, and Williams Street. The building had a frontage of 182.4 feet (55.6 m) on Luckie Street, 128.35 feet (39.12 m) on Peachtree Street, 150.5 feet (45.9 m) on Forsyth Street, and 33.5 feet (10.2 m) at the intersection of Broad, Luckie, and Peachtree streets. The building stood 11 stories tall. On the first floor was the main lobby of the building, which had marble columns and was decorated with large frescoes. Connected to the lobby was the hotel's offices, parlor rooms, and several shops. Additionally, a dining room was affixed to the lobby, with a space for the hotel's orchestra nearby. The hotel rooms were located on the second floor and above and could be reached from the lobby by either stairs or an elevator. Private dining rooms and the hotel's kitchen were also located on the second floor.

== See also ==
- Hotels in Atlanta

== Sources ==
- "Patterson Opens Beautiful Spring Hill". The City Builder. II (6). Atlanta Chamber of Commerce: 35–36. November 1928.
- Cleaton, J. D. (1907). Atlanta: The Metropolis of the South. Atlanta: Franklin-Turner Co. LCCN 07028163.
- Garrett, Franklin M. (1969a). Atlanta and Environs: A Chronicle of Its People and Events, 1820s-1870s. Vol. I. Athens, Georgia: University of Georgia Press. ISBN 978-0-8203-3902-3.
- Garrett, Franklin M. (1969b). Atlanta and Environs: A Chronicle of Its People and Events, 1880s-1930s. Vol. II. Athens, Georgia: University of Georgia Press. ISBN 978-0-8203-3904-7.
- Garrett, Franklin M. (Spring 1985). "Notes and Documents: The Passing of the Piedmont Hotel: A Short History of the Equitable Block". Atlanta Historical Journal. XXIX (1). Atlanta Historical Society: 53–62.
- Glass, Dudley (July 1929). ""Tear It Down and Build It Bigger—And Better"". The City Builder. Atlanta Chamber of Commerce: 3–4.
- Gournay, Isabelle (1993). Sams, Gerald W. (ed.). AIA guide to the architecture of Atlanta. American Institute of Architects. Athens, Georgia: University of Georgia Press. ISBN 978-0-8203-1439-6.
- Gue, Randy (Summer 1999). "Nickel Madness: Atlanta's Storefront Movie Theaters, 1906–1911". Atlanta History: A Journal of Georgia and the South. XLIII (2). Atlanta History Center: 34–44.
- Hale, F. Sheffield (Spring 1984). "Richard B. Russell's Election to the Senate: The Watershed of Two Political Careers". Atlanta Historical Journal. XXVIII (1). Atlanta Historical Society: 5–22.
- Hastings, W. G. (April 1929). "Hotels Have Helped Build Atlanta". The City Builder. Atlanta Chamber of Commerce: 9–10, 47–48.
- Houser, Fred (October–November 1923). "Spend the Winter in Atlanta". The City Builder. VIII (8 & 9). Atlanta Chamber of Commerce: 4–5.
- Howland, William S. (May 1950). "Peggy Mitchell, Newspaperman". Atlanta Historical Bulletin. IX (34). Atlanta Historical Society: 47–66.
- Martin, Harold H. (1987). Atlanta and Environs: A Chronicle of Its People and Events, 1940s-1970s. Vol. III. Athens, Georgia: University of Georgia Press. ISBN 978-0-8203-3906-1.
- Morgan, Thomas H. (July 1937). "Reminiscences of the Architecture and Architects of Atlanta". Atlanta Historical Bulletin. X (2). Atlanta Historical Society: 5–13.
- Newton, Louie D. (October 1928). "Atlanta Will Have Another Skyscraper". The City Builder. Atlanta Chamber of Commerce: 17, 43.
- Rice, Bradley R. (Spring 1985). "Editor's Note". Atlanta Historical Journal. XXIX (1). Atlanta Historical Society: 4.
- Scott, Henry B. (July–August 1921). "Marvelous Story of Atlanta Real Estate". The City Builder. VI (5 & 6). Atlanta Chamber of Commerce: 3–5, 18–19, 26.
- "The History of the Southern Conference". Southern Conference. Archived from the original on July 7, 2022.
- Taylor, Boyd (January 1930). "Record Business Building Year for Atlanta in 1930". The City Builder. Atlanta Chamber of Commerce: 3, 6–7.
