= Trout House =

Hotel in antebellum Atlanta, Georgia

Coordinates: 33.7538°N 84.3895°W

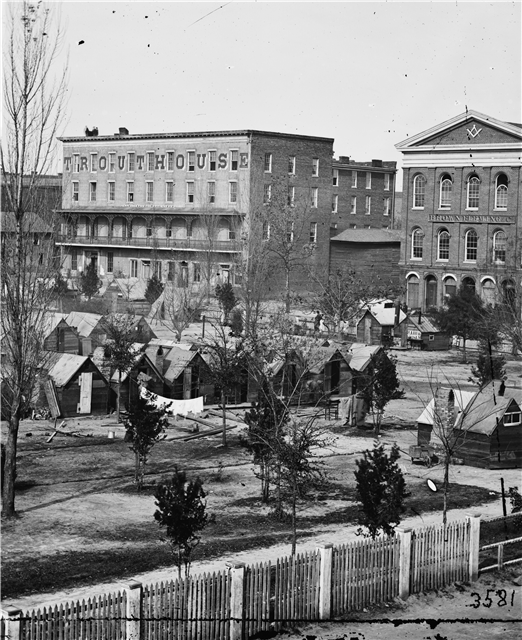
Trout House visible at back of this photo of State Square during Civil War, when the square was the site of a "tent hospital"

The Trout House was one of three hotels in antebellum Atlanta, Georgia, along with the Atlanta Hotel and Washington Hall. It was built in 1849 by Jeremiah F. Trout. It was a four-story brick building at the northeast corner of Decatur and Pryor Streets, facing the union depot and State Square.

Confederate President Jefferson Davis spoke here during his visit to Atlanta of February 16, 1861, although he did not spend the night.

The hotel was destroyed during General Sherman's burning of Atlanta.

== See also ==
- Hotels in Atlanta
