= Terminal Hotel =

Terminal Hotel may refer to:

- Terminal Hotel (Atlanta), a demolished building in Atlanta
- Terminal Hotel (Little Rock, Arkansas), a historic property in Little Rock, Arkansas
- Terminal Hotel, a historic hotel in Meridian, Mississippi
