= Mitchell Street =

Mitchell Street may mean:

- Mitchell Street, a street containing the Hotel Row historic district in Atlanta, Georgia
- Mitchell Street, the entertainment hub of Darwin, Northern Territory, Australia
- Mitchell Street, a neighborhood of Milwaukee, Wisconsin
