= Washington Hall (hotel) =

Historic hotel in Atlanta, Georgia, U.S.

Coordinates: 33°45′9″N 84°23′15″W

General information
- Type: Hotel
- Location: Atlanta, Georgia, United States
- Completed: 1846
- Destroyed: 1864

Technical details
- Floor count: 2

Washington Hall was a historic hotel in antebellum Atlanta, Georgia. Built in 1846, the building was one of the earliest hotels built in the city. The hotel, along with many other structures in the city, was destroyed in 1864 during the Battle of Atlanta.

== History ==
Washington Hall was constructed by James Loyd in late 1846 at the intersection of Loyd Street (later Central Avenue) and the Georgia Railroad line in downtown Atlanta. Loyd had purchased the site in 1844. The building was one of the Atlanta's earliest hotels. The Atlanta Hotel was constructed earlier in 1846 and the Trout House followed in 1849. Loyd operated the hotel for almost a year before leasing the building to H. C. Holcombe and Zachariah A. Rice in October 1847. Two years later, after their lease had expired and Rice had departed for the California gold fields, Loyd again managed the hotel for several years before selling the property.

The hotel was a two-story tall brick and wood building. It was described as being of "uncertain architecture" due to the constant renovations and expansions it underwent shortly after its construction to accommodate the rapid growth of Atlanta preceding the Civil War. According to multiple sources, the Atlanta Hotel was the more upscale of the two buildings.

Like many of the buildings in Atlanta at the time, the hotel was destroyed during General Sherman's burning of Atlanta, wherein a scorched earth policy was employed; the Atlanta Hotel also suffered the same fate.

When Atlanta was rebuilt after the war, another famous Atlanta hotel, Markham House, replaced Washington Hall in 1875. Like Washington Hall, Markham House would also be destroyed by fire, as it burned down in 1896.

== See also ==
- Hotels in Atlanta
