= Thompson Hotel =

Thompson Hotel may refer to:

- One of brands of Hyatt
- Atlanta Hotel, also known as Thompson's Hotel
