= Imperial Hotel (Atlanta) =

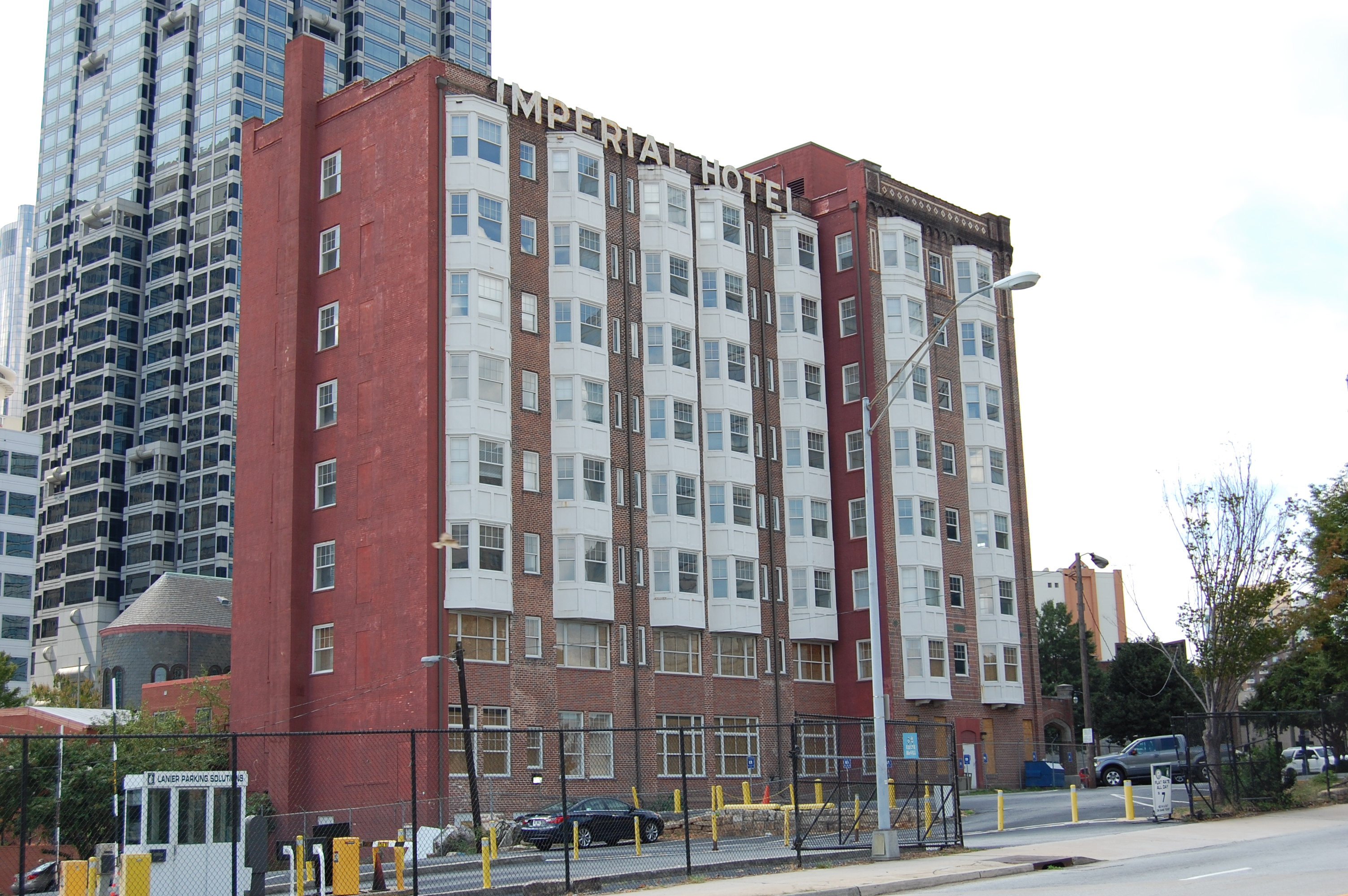
- Interactive map of the Imperial Hotel area

General information
- Type: Hotel
- Location: 355 Peachtree Street NW; Atlanta, Georgia
- Completed: 1910
- Imperial Hotel
- U.S. National Register of Historic Places
- Atlanta Historic Building
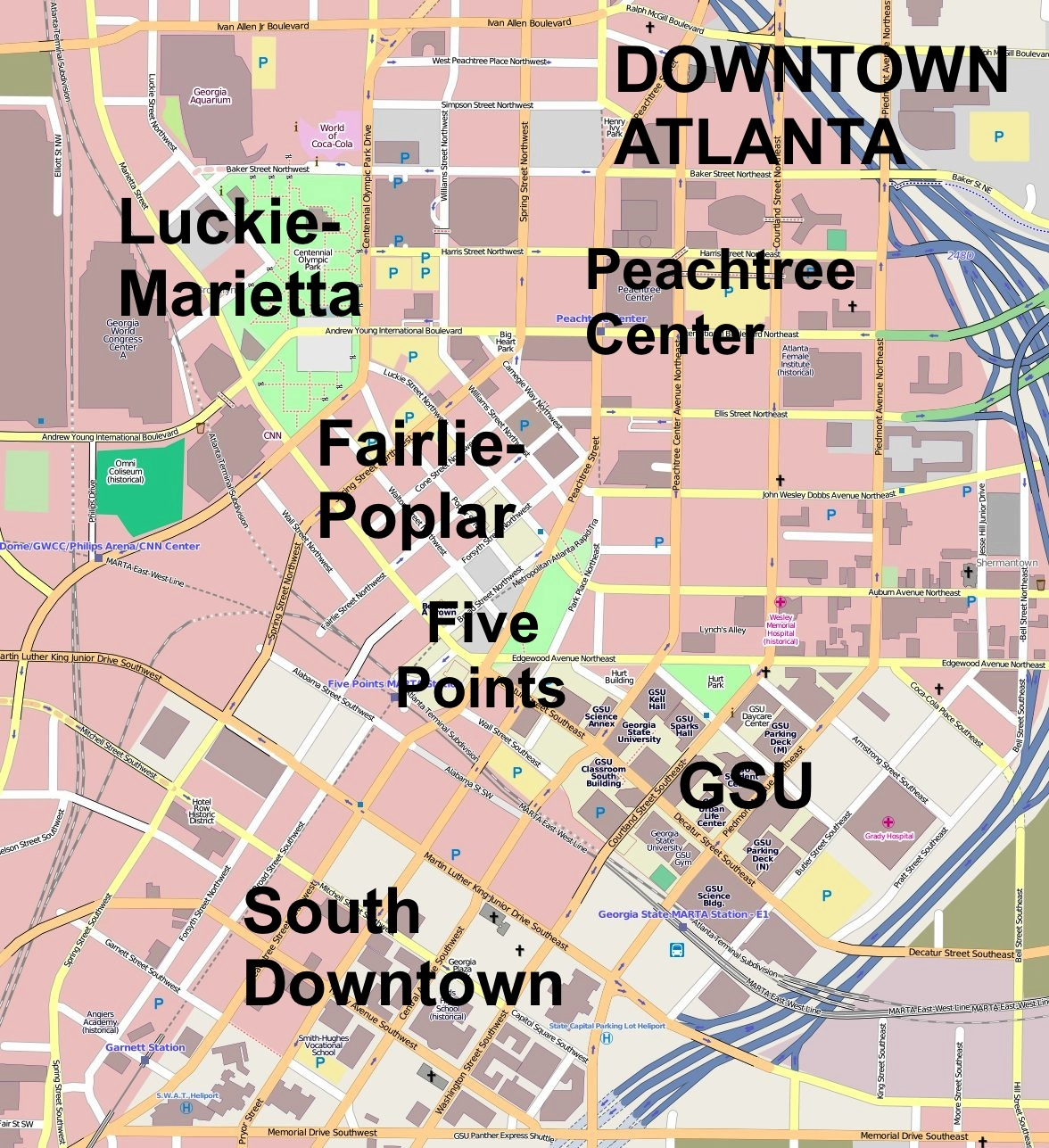
- Location within Downtown Atlanta
- Coordinates: 33°45′50″N 84°23′8″W
- Area: less than one acre
- Built: 1910
- Architect: Dougherty, Edward E.; Walker, R. M.
- Architectural style: Chicago school
- NRHP reference No.: 83000229
- Designated AHB: October 23, 1989

The Imperial Hotel in Atlanta is one of the few remaining tall buildings from the city's construction boom in the early 20th century. The former hotel was opened in 1910, has 8 stories, and is representative of the Chicago school due to the flat roof and brick facade with grids of bay windows. It contains two historic Otis elevators. It was abandoned in 1980, added to the National Register of Historic Places a few years later, eventually converted to low-income housing, and underwent another round of renovations as of 2012.

== History ==
The hotel was completed in 1910 as part of a construction boom in Atlanta and helped expand the city northward along Peachtree Street. In 1913 the hotel was said to have cost $300,000, have 119 rooms and 59 individual baths, offering both the American and European plans. The first floor was remodeled in 1953 from Tudor arches to a projected floor entrance. The first floor was remodeled again following a fire in 1968. The building was purchased by John Portman in 1980 and abandoned. In 1990, homeless people began occupying it, and it was converted to low-income housing in 1996 when Atlanta was cleaning up to host the Olympics.

In 2014, following a comprehensive recapitalization and renovation, the Imperial Hotel - now renamed The Commons at Imperial Hotel - reopened as 90-unit permanent supportive housing facility for former homeless and special needs residents through CaringWorks, Inc. Atlanta-based Columbia Residential, a nationally recognized developer of multifamily affordable housing communities and National Church Residences, the nation's largest provider of affordable senior housing, are the developers and owners of the building.

== Gallery ==
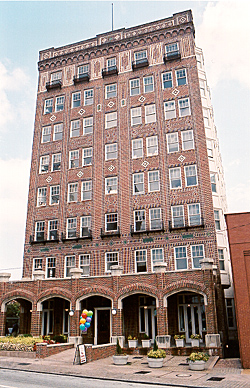
Imperial Hotel entrance

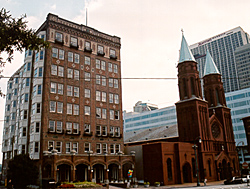
Imperial Hotel, next to the Church of the Sacred Heart of Jesus

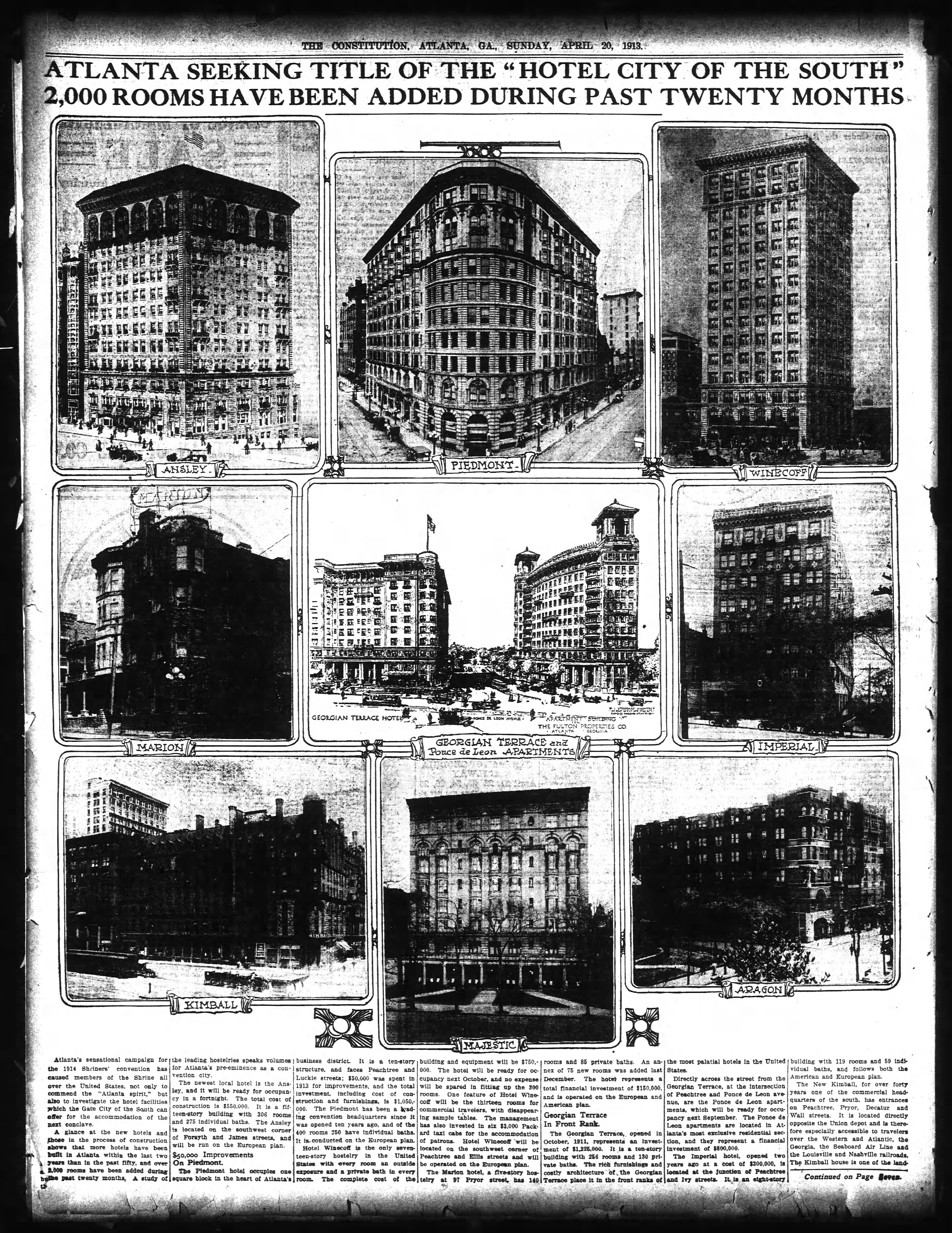
The Imperial was featured in an article from the Atlanta Constitution of April 20, 1913 about the city's new hotels.

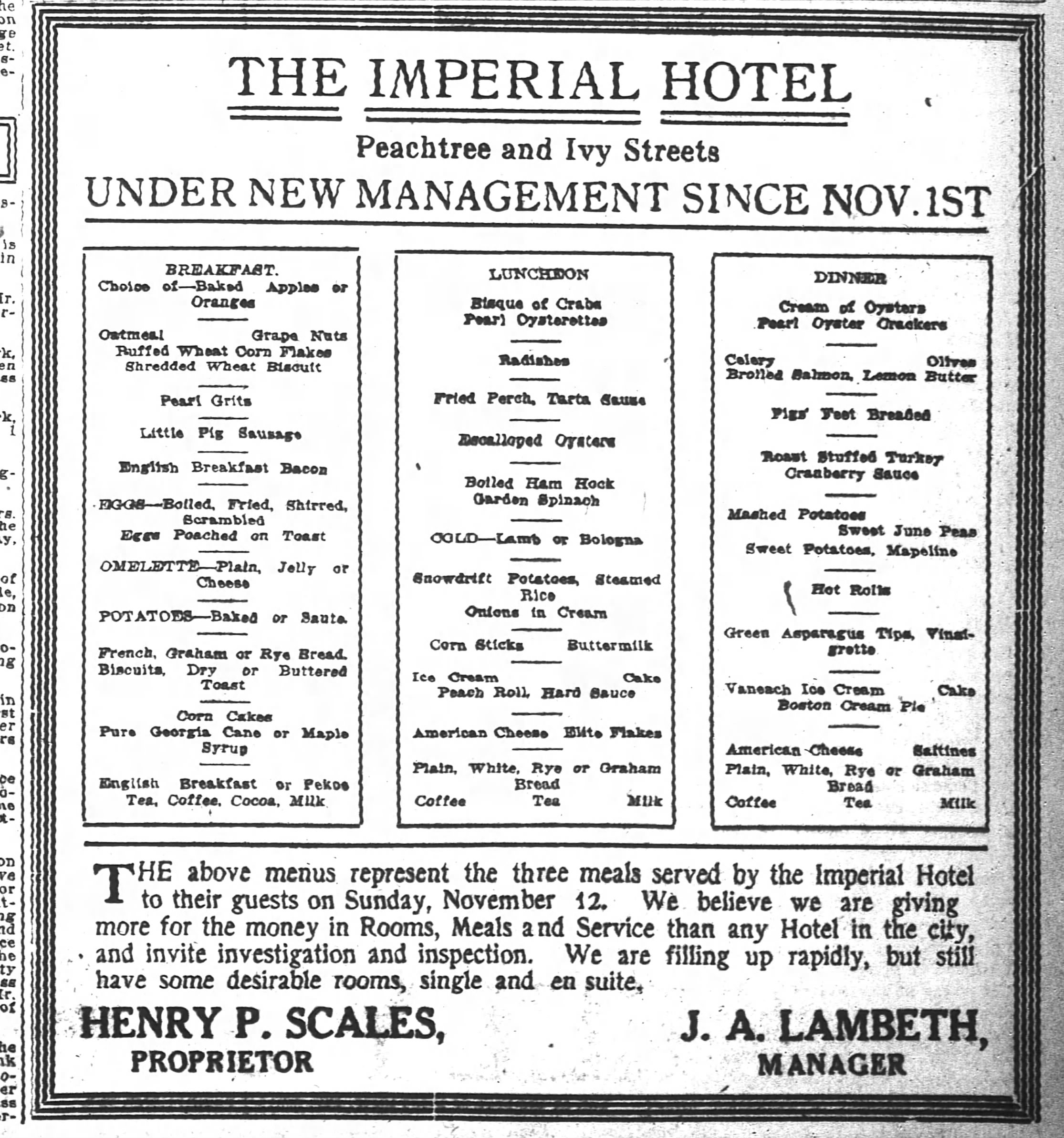
Ad in the Atlanta Constitution of November 17, 1916 for the Imperial Hotel, featuring its menus

== See also ==
- National Register of Historic Places listings in Fulton County, Georgia
- Hotels in Atlanta
