= Terminal Hotel (Atlanta) =

Coordinates: 33°45′9″N 84°23′42″W

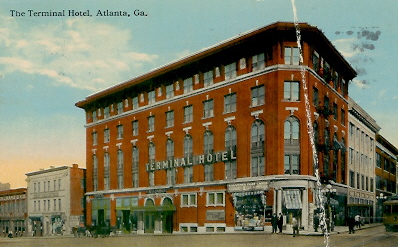
- Postcard of Terminal Hotel (1914)

General information
- Location: Hotel Row, Atlanta, Fulton County, Georgia, United States
- Completed: 1906
- Destroyed: 1938

The Terminal Hotel was a hotel in Atlanta, Georgia, United States. Built by Samuel M. Inman in 1906, the hotel was located at the intersection of Spring Street and Mitchell Street in the Hotel Row district of downtown. It suffered two major fires during its existence, the latter of which completely destroyed the building.

== History ==
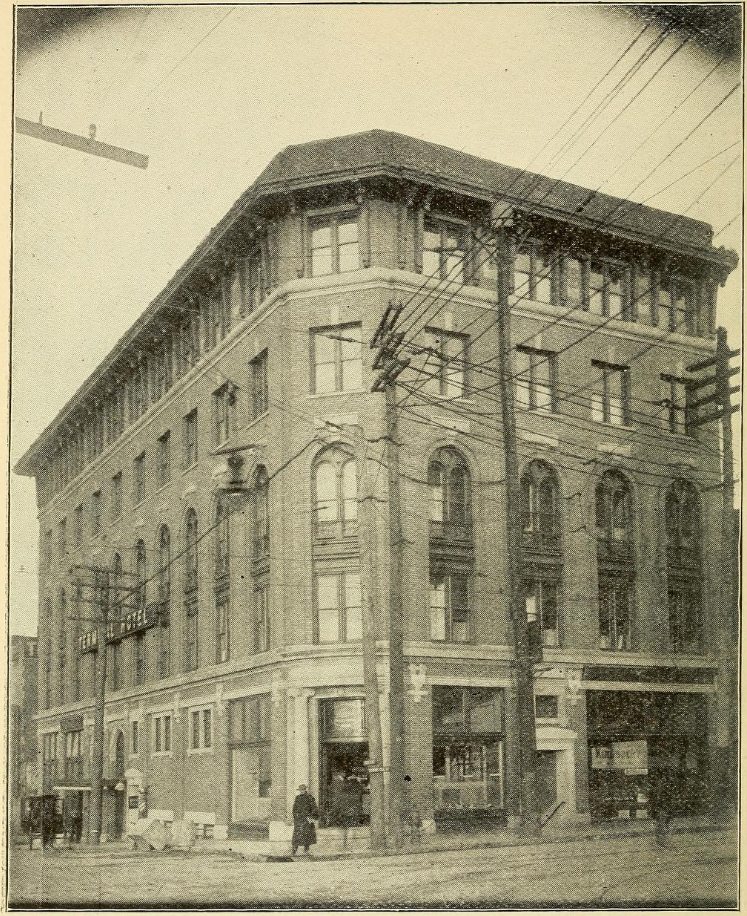
Terminal Hotel in 1907

With the opening of Terminal Station in downtown Atlanta in 1905, the area known as Hotel Row was developed with several hotels intended to serve passengers from the station. Terminal Hotel was built in 1906 by Samuel M. Inman and located directly across from the station, at the intersection of Spring Street and Mitchell Street. The five-story building had cost Inman $75,000 to build. The hotel officially opened in November of that year.

=== Fires ===
Terminal Hotel experienced several major fires during its existence. The first occurred shortly after the building's construction on May 8, 1908, when a fire spread throughout the district and destroyed 30 buildings. Though without casualties, it is estimated that the fire cost approximately $1 million in property damage, including $400,000 of losses by Inman.

Thirty years later, on May 16, 1938, another fire broke out in the building. During the fire, the hotel's roof collapsed. This one was more severe than the previous one, leading to the deaths of 34 people in what was at the time the worst hotel fire in Atlanta history. In the aftermath, the hotel was completely destroyed and was not rebuilt.

== See also ==
- Hotels in Atlanta
- Winecoff Hotel fire
