= State Square =

Former public square in Atlanta, Georgia

Coordinates: 33.7529138°N 84.388902°W

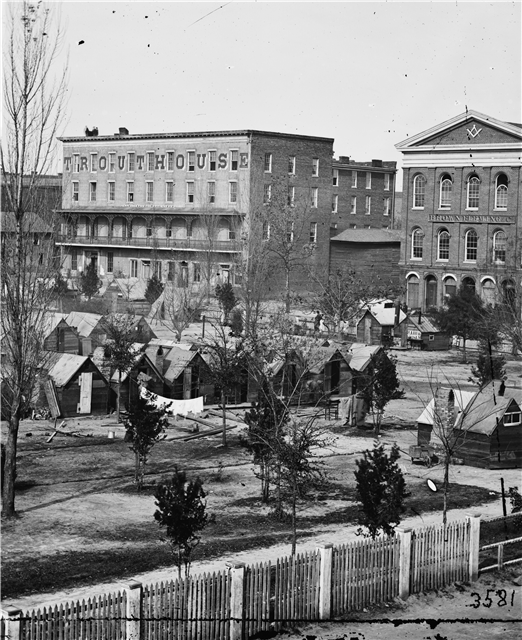
State Square with "tent hospital" during Civil War

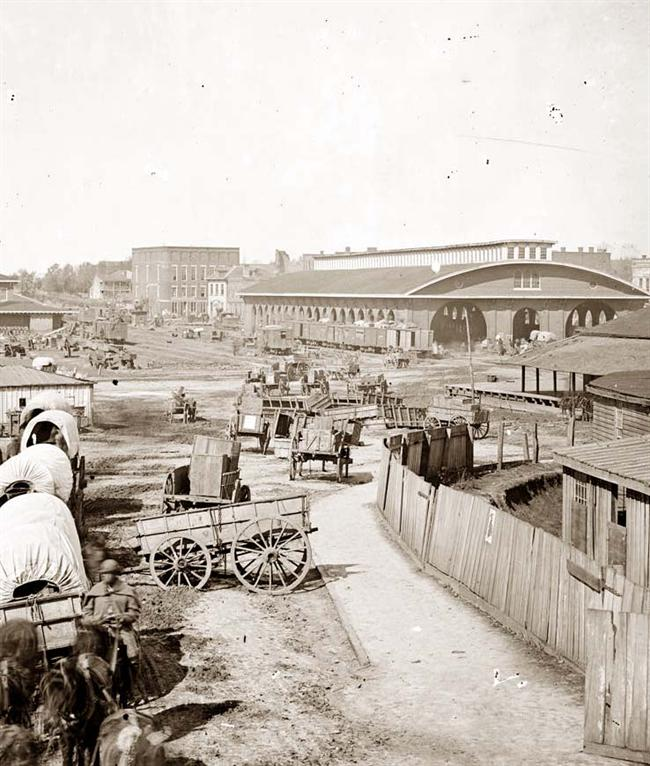
State Square and first Union Station, 1864 or before

State Square was the central square of antebellum Atlanta, Georgia. The original Atlanta Union Depot designed by Edward A. Vincent stood in the middle of the square. The square was bounded by Marietta Street (now Decatur Street) on the northeast, Pryor Street on the northwest, Loyd Street (now Shirley Franklin Boulevard) on the southeast, and Alabama Street on the south. The square was surrounded by Atlanta's most important buildings including the hotels Atlanta, Trout House, and Washington Hall, the Atlanta Bank, retail stores, and warehouses.The area is now almost entirely taken up by parking lots and parking garages, with a portion occupied by the Georgia State University College of Education, MARTA rail line, and retail and office space lining the north side of Alabama Street.
