= Grand Hyatt Atlanta in Buckhead =

Hotel in Atlanta, Georgia

Coordinates: 33.8452°N 84.3703°W

- Interactive map of the Grand Hyatt Atlanta in Buckhead area
- Hotel chain: Global Hyatt Corporation

General information
- Location: United States, 3300 Peachtree Road; Atlanta, Georgia
- Opening: 1990

Technical details
- Floor count: 25
- Floor area: 30,000 sq ft (2,800 m^{2})

Other information
- Number of rooms: 439
- Number of restaurants: 2 (Cassis, Onyx)

Website
- www.hyatt.com/en-US/hotel/georgia/grand-hyatt-atlanta-in-buckhead/atlgh

Grand Hyatt Atlanta in Buckhead is a 25-story building at 3300 Peachtree Road Northeast, among restaurants and a shopping mall district of the Buckhead neighborhood in Atlanta, Georgia, USA.

== History ==
The hotel opened in October 1990 as the Hotel Nikko Atlanta, owned by Nikko Hotels. The Japanese owners introduced Japanese Zen gardens and a sushi restaurant.

In February 1997, Hyatt Corporation purchased the hotel and renamed it the Grand Hyatt Atlanta. There were already two Hyatt hotels in the Atlanta area at that time, the Hyatt Regency Atlanta and Hyatt Regency Suites Perimeter Northwest.

Grand Hyatt Atlanta in Buckhead has 439 guest rooms and 20 luxury suites. The full-service hotel has two restaurants, Cassis and Onyx at the Grand.

== See also ==
- Hotels in Atlanta
