= Wash Collier =

George Washington "Wash" Collier (29 November 1813 – 20 June 1903) was one of the first recognised settlers in the Atlanta area.

Wash Collier came to the Atlanta area when his father, Meredith Collier, purchased Land Lot 104 in 1822. On that land Meredith Collier built a four-room house. Wash Collier was one of 15 children and he purchased the house and land from his father. Around 1868, Wash Collier built on the site of his father's house a new house, which still stands today in what is now Ansley Park. He was the first postmaster in the area running mail from the fort at Standing Peachtree on the Chattahoochee River. He held on to his undeveloped land lot 104 most of his life which left the northern part of Midtown in a rustic state.

In 1899 he gave an extensive interview to the Atlanta Journal which is an important primary source for the early history of the area.

Collier built and owned the Hotel Aragon, one of the city's principal hotels.

== Siblings ==
- Edwin G. Collier (17 Nov 1807 - bef 1901 )
- Nancy Collier (24 Dec 1808 - bef 1901 )
- Merrell Collier (10 Mar 1810 - 1865 )
- Sarah Ann Collier Paty Ballenger (21 Dec 1811 - Aft. 1853)
- John Collier (6 May 1815 - 06 Nov 1892)
- Aaron Collier (7 Feb 1817 - bef 1901 )
- Francis Marion Collier (01 Oct 1820 - 13 Sep 1864)
- Mary Emiline 'Emily' Collier Evins (01 Oct 1820 - 21 Feb 1913)
- James Madison Collier (6 Jun 1822 - 13 July 1901)
- Wesley Gray Collier (6 Jan 1824 - 1 March 1906)
- Elizabeth Collier Liddell (8 Nov 1825 - aft 1903)
- Andrew Jackson Collier (11 Jul 1827 - 24 Oct 1887)
- Mary Ann Collier Donaldson (15 Feb 1829 - 1880)
- Meredith Collier (30 Apr 1831 - 1860 )
