= Atlanta Marriott Marquis =

Hotel in Atlanta, Georgia

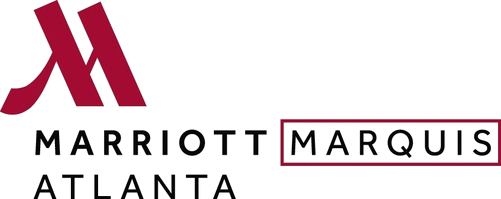

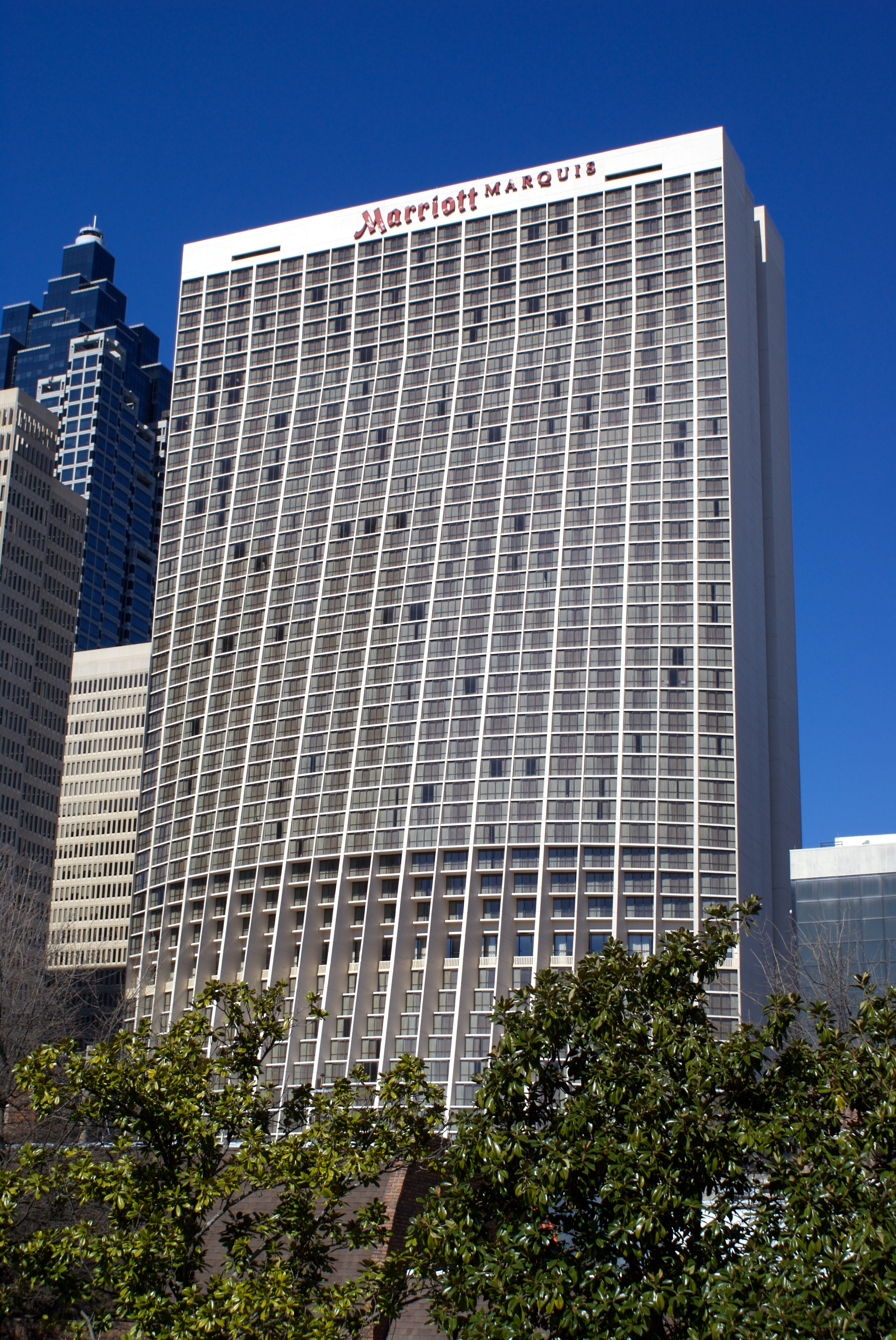
- The Atlanta Marriott Marquis in 2008.
- Interactive map of the Atlanta Marriott Marquis area
- Hotel chain: Marriott Marquis

General information
- Architectural style: Brutalist; Neo-futurist
- Location: 265 Peachtree Center Avenue NE; Atlanta, Georgia, United States
- Coordinates: 33.7613°N 84.3847°W
- Opening: 1985
- Cost: US$150 million
- Operator: Marriott International

Height
- Height: 168.86 m (554.0 ft)

Technical details
- Floor count: 47
- Lifts/elevators: 15 passenger elevators, 6 service elevators, 2 parking elevators, and 2 shuttle elevators

Design and construction
- Architect: John Portman and Associates

Other information
- Number of rooms: 1,663
- Number of restaurants: Sear Restaurant; Sear Bar; High Velocity; Pulse; Pool Bar; Starbucks

Website
- https://www.marriott.com/hotels/travel/atlmq-atlanta-marriott-marquis

The Atlanta Marriott Marquis is a 47-story, 168.86 m (554.0 ft) Marriott hotel in Atlanta, Georgia, United States. It is the 15th tallest skyscraper in the city. The building was designed by Atlanta architect John C. Portman Jr. and supported by local engineer Blake Van Leer with construction completed in 1985. Because of its bulging base, it is often referred to as the "Pregnant Building" or the "Coca Cola" building as it resembles a bottle of Coke from the side elevation.

== Renovations ==
The hotel's first renovation, costing $138 million, took place between 2005 and 2008. This included a Starbucks Coffee, new restaurants, a new pool, new meeting rooms, a new spa, refurbished guest rooms, and other updates. Then in 2015, it was once again remodeled with a cost of $78 million and featuring updates such as new guest rooms, Stay Well rooms, a concierge lounge and more.

== Features ==
One of the defining features of the Marriott Marquis is its large atrium. It was the largest in the world upon its completion in 1985, at 469.16 feet (143.0 m) high. The atrium spans the entire height of the building and consists of two vertical chambers divided by elevator shafts and bridges. The record was later broken by the Burj Al Arab in Dubai.

The 42nd floor features a concierge lounge, which is only accessible for the hotel's Premium Elite members and guests who stay in concierge level rooms.

== Media ==
In the films The Hunger Games: Catching Fire and The Hunger Games: Mockingjay – Part 1, some scenes of the Capitol's tribute center were filmed here. Some scenes of the 2012 movie Flight were shot in the hotel as well. The atrium is also seen briefly in the 1986 movie Manhunter, and the 2023 film Ghosted. It made a brief appearance in a trailer for the 2017 movie Spider-Man: Homecoming. It was also used as the Time Variance Authority headquarters in the Disney+ series Loki. One of its venue hall was featured as a wedding reception in Ms. Marvel.

== Gallery ==
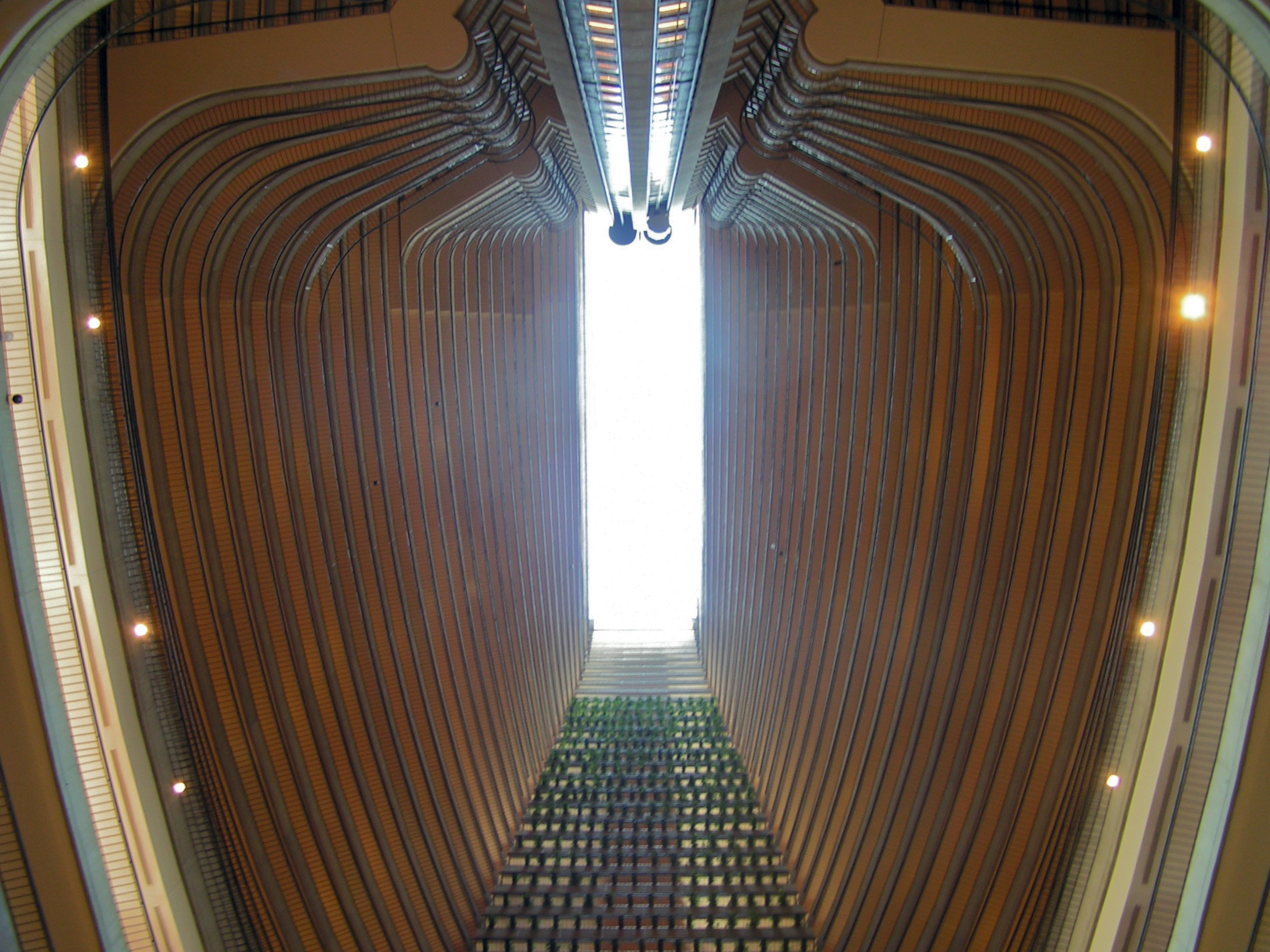
The Atrium of the Marriott from the Lobby

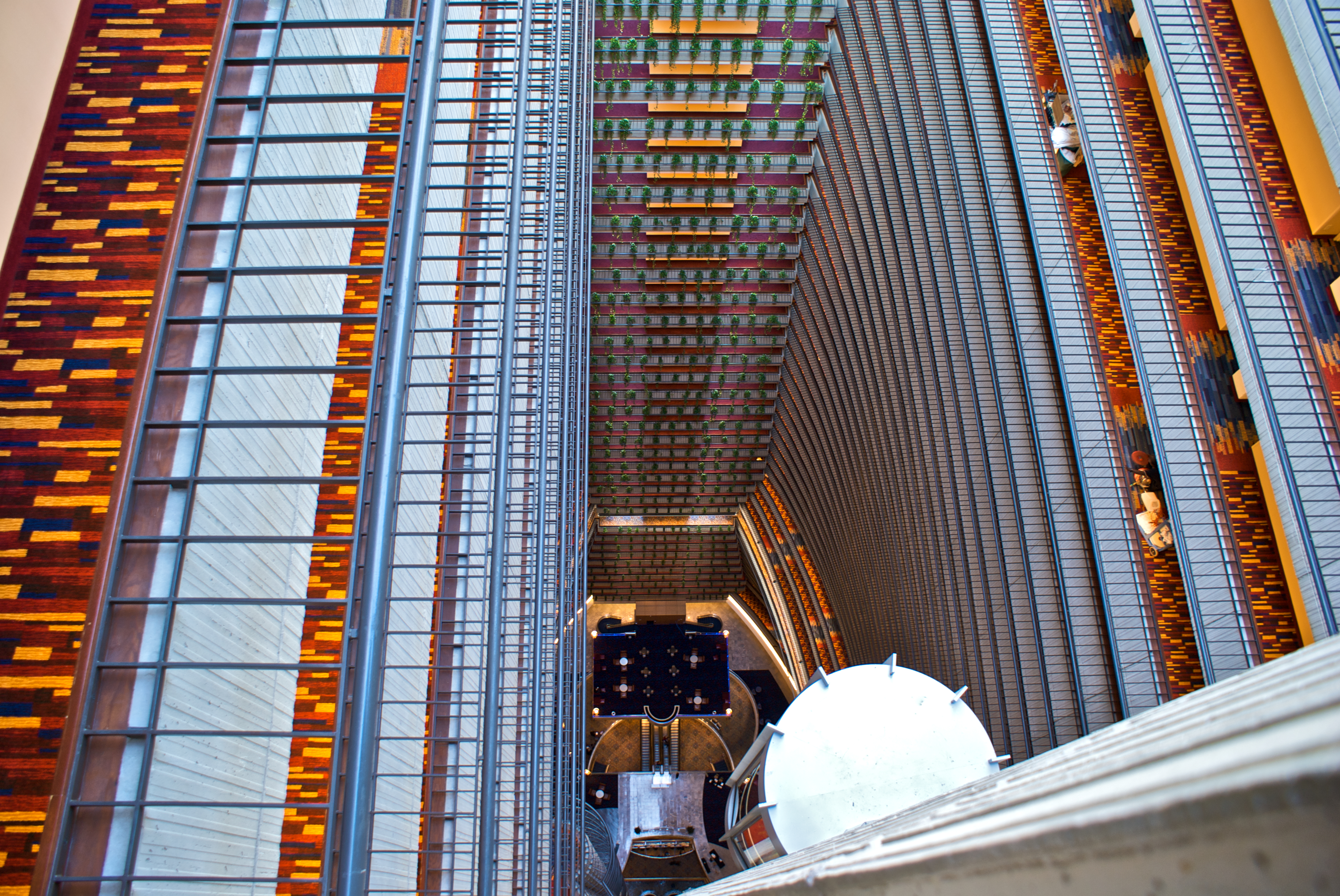
View from the 47th floor

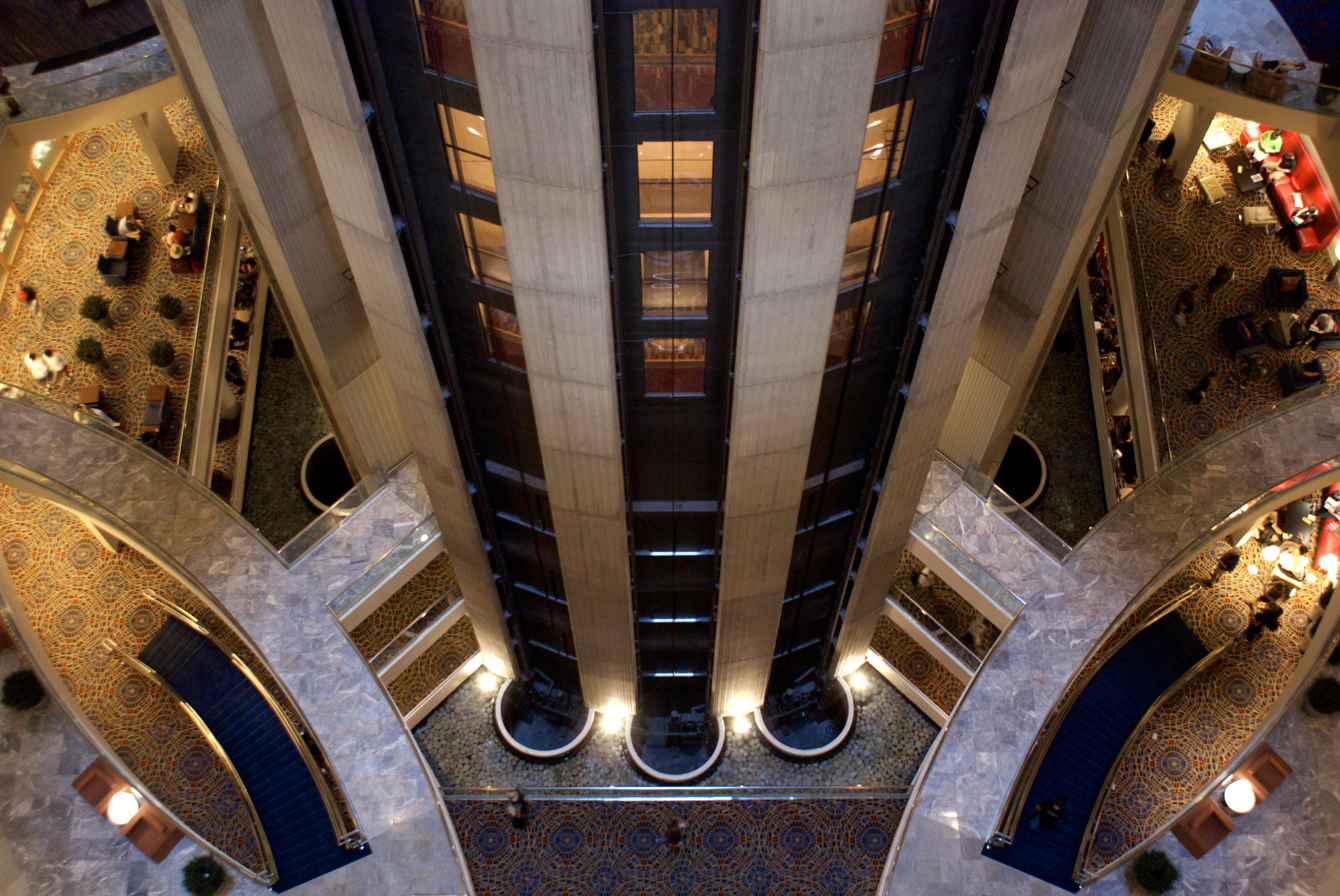
Downward view of the rear atrium from the 10th floor

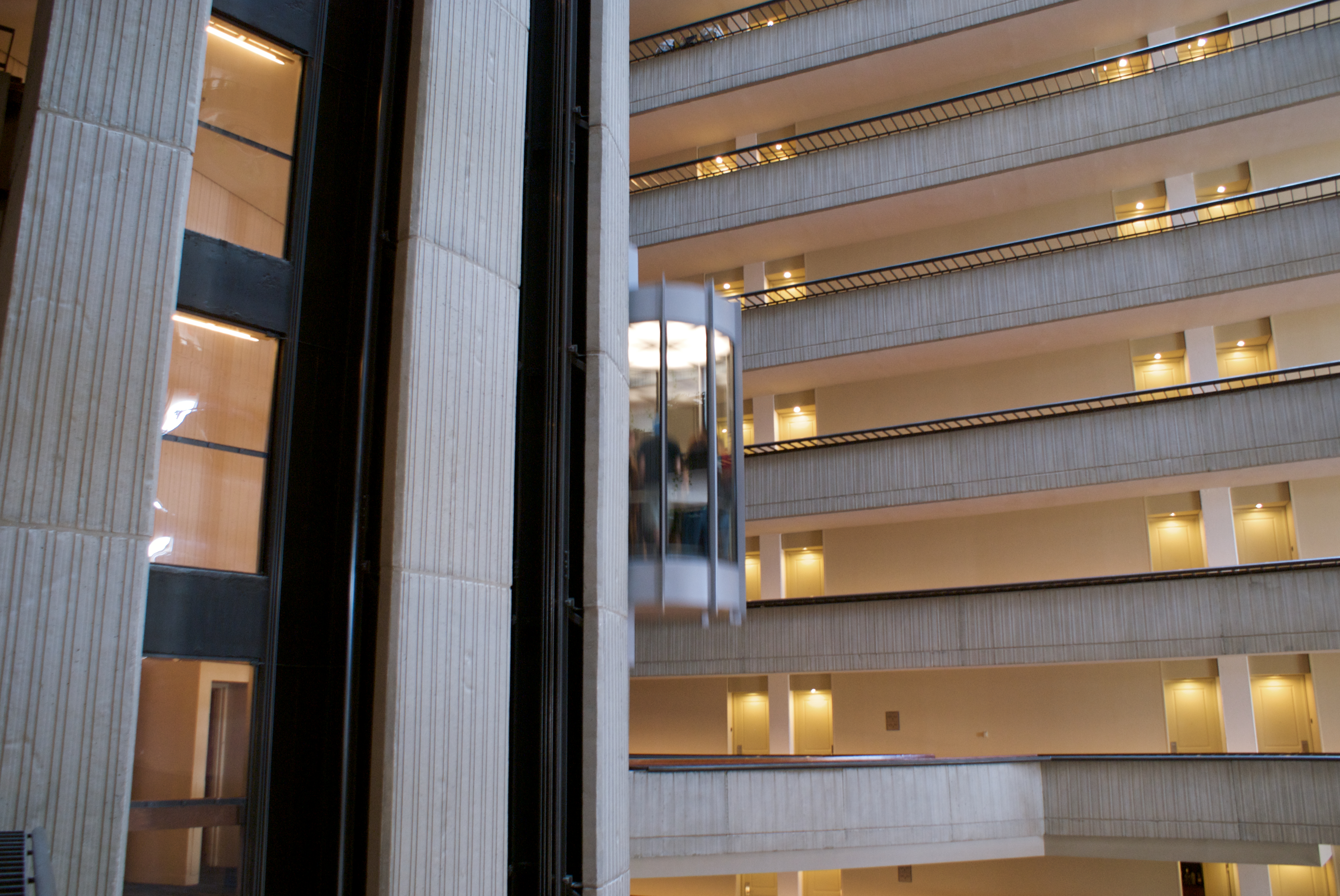
Elevator speeding by one of the upper floors

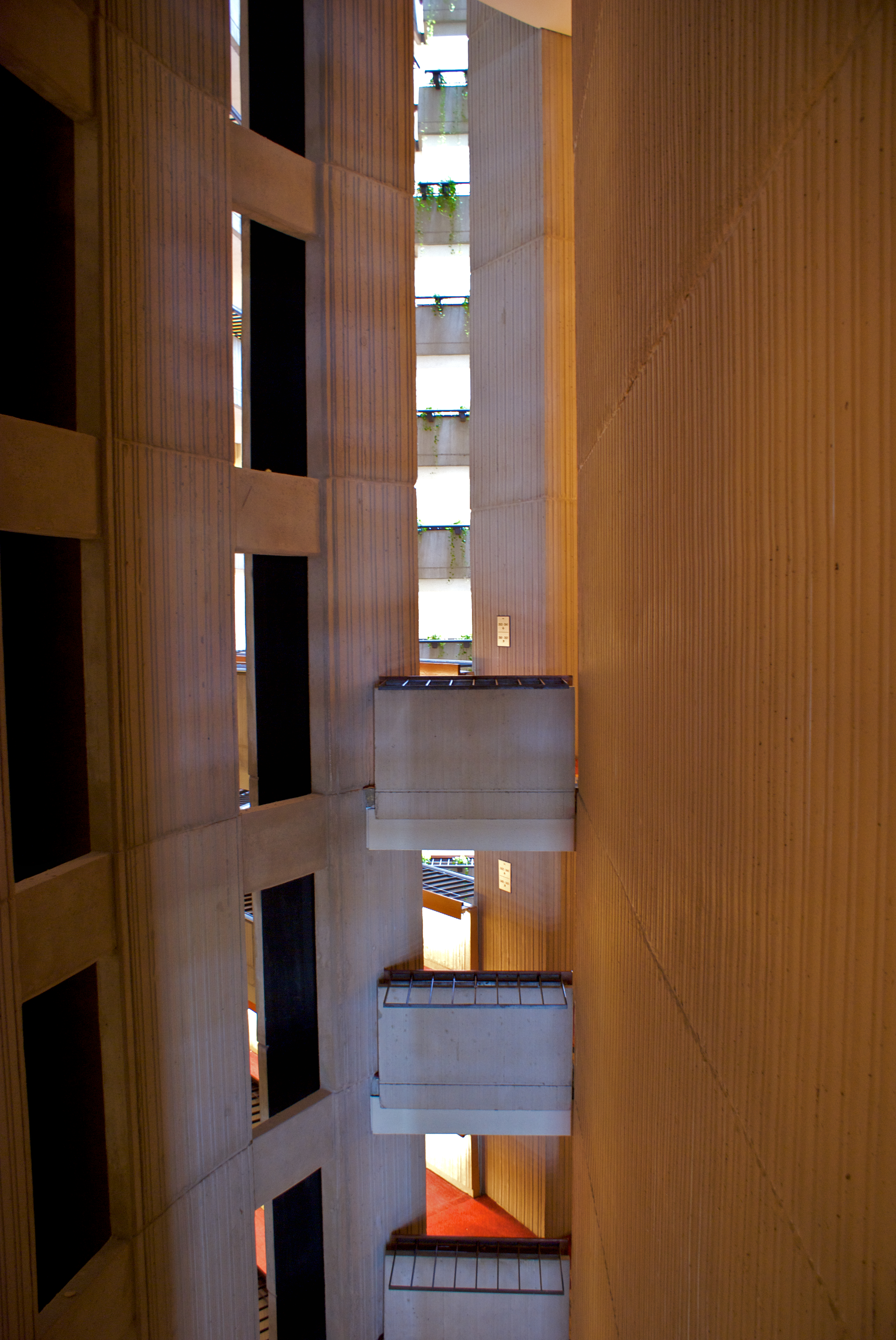
Elevator shafts on the 25th floor

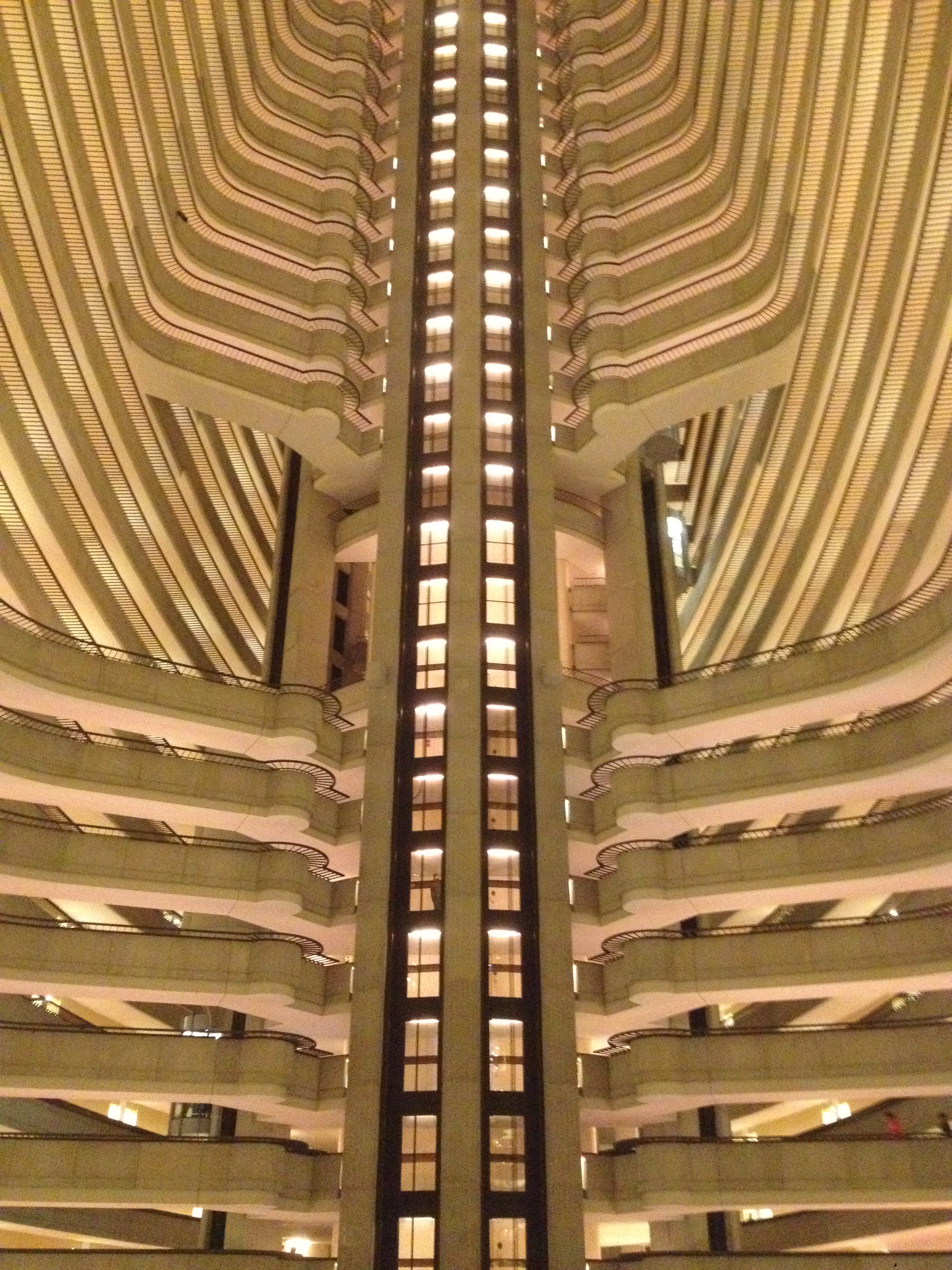
View of elevator shafts from the 4th floor

== See also ==
- List of tallest buildings in Atlanta
- Hotels in Atlanta
