= Waldorf Astoria Atlanta Buckhead =

Skyscraper hotel in Buckhead Atlanta, Georgia, United States

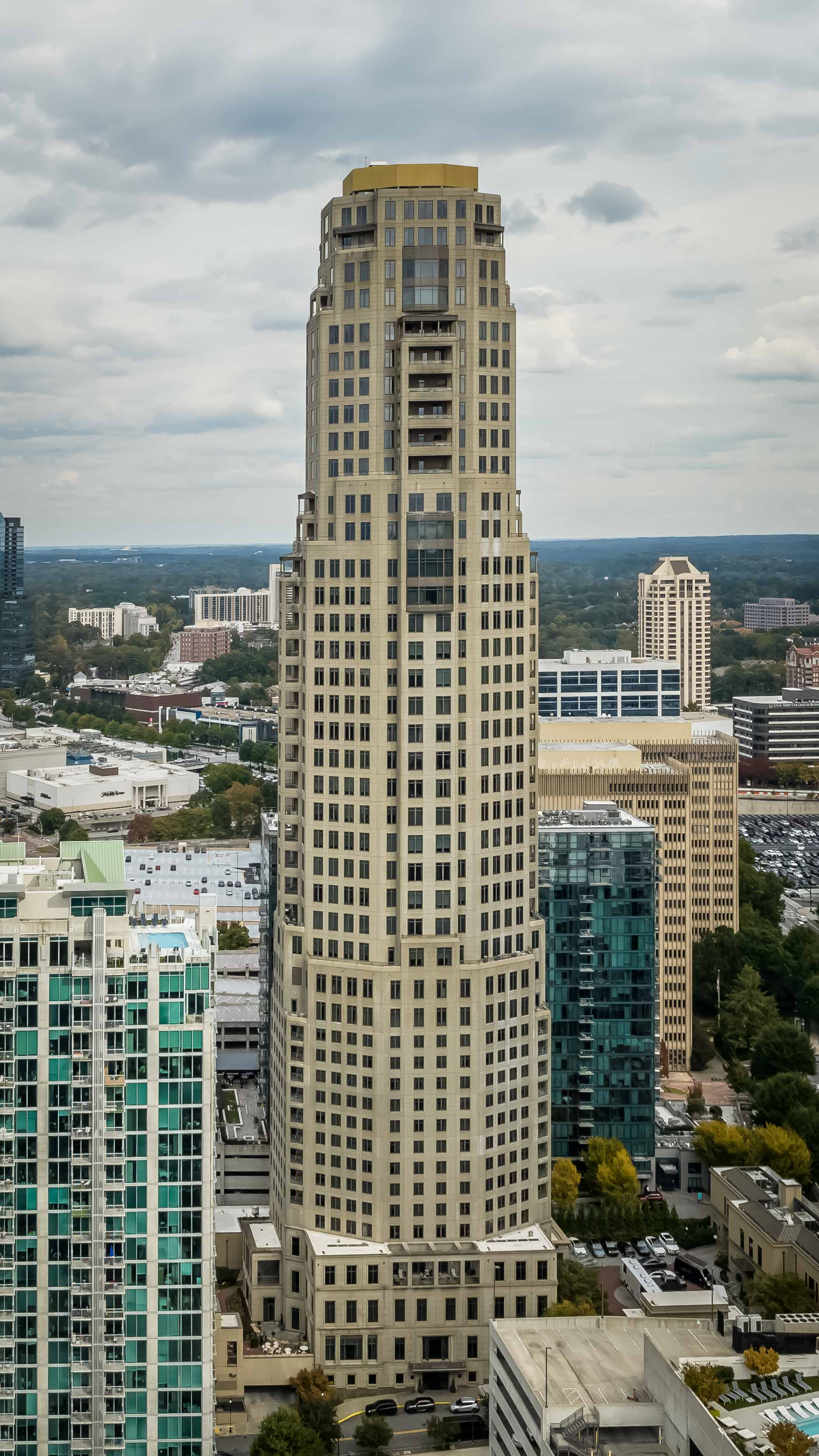
- The Waldorf Astoria Atlanta Buckhead in 2025.
- Interactive map of the Waldorf Astoria Atlanta Buckhead area
- Former names: The Mansion on Peachtree – A Rosewood Hotel & Residence (2008–2010); Mandarin Oriental, Atlanta (2010–2018)
- Hotel chain: Waldorf Astoria

General information
- Type: Hotel and condominium residence
- Location: 3376 Peachtree Road NE; Atlanta, Georgia 30326; U.S.
- Coordinates: 33°50′59″N 84°22′00″W
- Construction started: 2006 (20 years ago)
- Completed: 2008 (18 years ago)
- Owner: Xenia Hotels & Resorts, Inc.
- Operator: Hilton Worldwide

Height
- Roof: 580 ft (180 m)

Technical details
- Floor count: 42
- Floor area: 616,000 sq ft (57,200 m^{2})

Design and construction
- Architect: Robert A.M. Stern Architects / Milton Pate Architects
- Developer: City Centre Properties, LLC
- Main contractor: Holder Construction Company

Website
- Official website

The Waldorf Astoria Atlanta Buckhead is a 580-foot (177-m) tall combination hotel and condominium building skyscraper in Atlanta, Georgia, United States.

It was constructed from 2006 to 2008 and has 42 floors. It is the twelfth-tallest building in Atlanta. The design architect for the building was Robert A.M. Stern Architects with Atlanta firm Milton Pate Architects serving as the architect of record and Robert A. Tretsch III, for Atlanta firm Harrison Design, as design architect for the condominiums. The project was developed by Atlanta-based City Centre Properties, LLC and constructed by Holder Construction Company.

== History ==
The tower was built at a cost of $197.4 million. The hotel portion opened for business on May 1, 2008, as The Mansion on Peachtree – A Rosewood Hotel & Residence, managed by Rosewood Hotels & Resorts. The grand opening was held a week later, on May 7.

The hotel was sold in foreclosure to iStar Financial on February 3, 2010, for $66.1 million. It was renamed Mandarin Oriental, Atlanta in 2012. The hotel was sold to Xenia Hotels & Resorts, Inc. for $53.5 million on December 10, 2018, and renamed Waldorf Astoria Atlanta Buckhead.

== Building ==
A 127-room hotel occupies the lower half of the building. Above the hotel are forty-five residential units on twenty-six floors. The Residences also consist of a separate building located in the English Gardens called "The Villas". The Villas consist of three separate private residences that include three floors of living space and private underground garages.

== Restaurants ==
In December 2008, Craft Atlanta, a branch of Tom Colicchio's New York–based restaurant, opened in a freestanding building in front of The Mansion. The interiors were designed by Bentel & Bentel Architects of New York. Milton Pate Architects of Atlanta again served as the architect of record for the interior build-out. Freese Construction Company of Atlanta served as the general contractor for the build out. The restaurant closed shortly before Valentine's Day 2010. Del Frisco's Grille opened in the space in late 2012. The restaurant is not part of the hotel business.

== See also ==
- List of tallest buildings in Atlanta
- Hotels in Atlanta
