= Connally Building =

Building in Atlanta, Georgia, US

Coordinates: 33.753172°N 84.391151°W

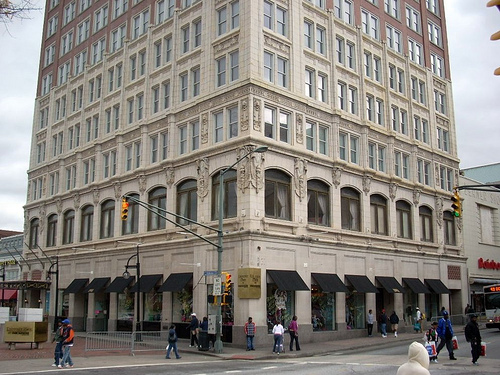
Connally Building (first five floors are the original building)

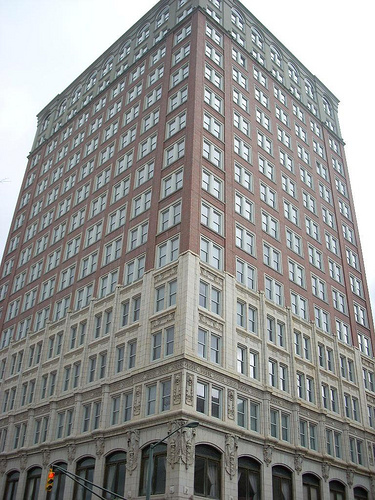
Connally Building after 1980s remodel (11 top stories added)

The Connally Building is located at 54 Peachtree Street (corner of Alabama Street) in Downtown Atlanta, adjacent to the Underground Atlanta retail center. It is a work of architect William Lee Stoddart, completed in 1916. The building has been so extensively renovated that it bears little resemblance to the original design, other than the terra cotta façade on the lower stories. This was originally a six-story office building with a terracotta facade, which replaced an earlier Connally Building on the site. In 1990, eleven stories were added and it was converted into a hotel. It has operated under the names Howard Johnson Plaza Suites, University Place at Underground, The Suite Hotel at the Underground, and most recently it became a Fairfield Inn & Suites.

== See also ==
- Hotels in Atlanta
