= Atlanta Union Station (1853) =

1853–1864 train station in Atlanta, Georgia

Coordinates: 33.7530°N 84.3890°W

Union Station Union Depot
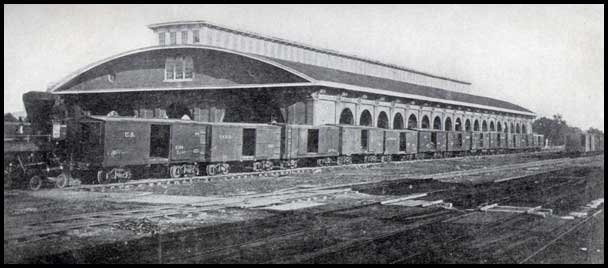
- First Atlanta Union Station before its destruction in 1864

General information
- Location: Atlanta, Georgia; United States

Construction
- Architect: Edward A. Vincent

History
- Opened: 1853
- Closed: 1864

Former services
Atlanta & LaGrange Railroad
Georgia Railroad
Macon & Western Railroad
Western & Atlantic Railroad
Location

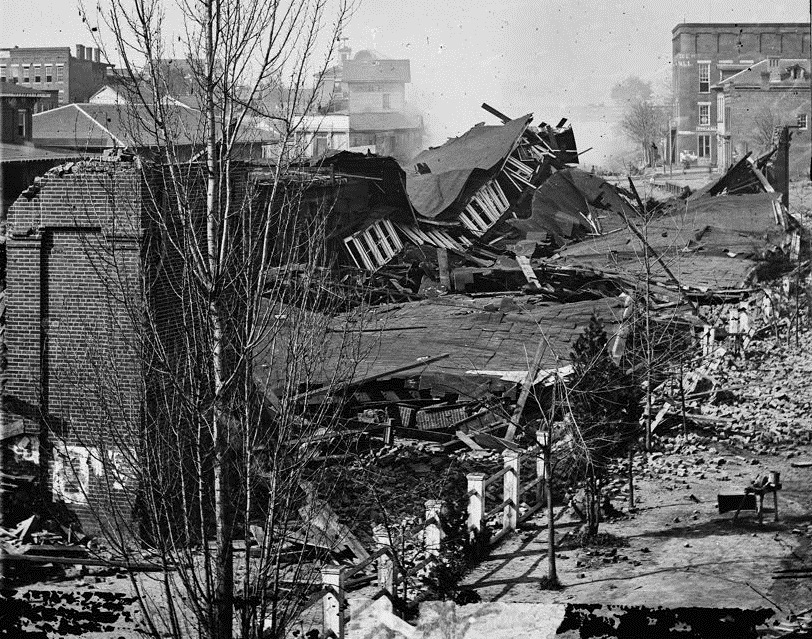
First Atlanta Union Station after its destruction, 1864

Atlanta's first Union Station, also known as Union Depot (1853–1864) was the original depot of Atlanta, Georgia. It was designed by architect Edward A. Vincent. It stood in the middle of State Square, the city's main square at the time, where Wall Street now is between Pryor Street and Central Avenue. It was destroyed in General Sherman's burning of the city during the Battle of Atlanta. Atlanta's 1871 Union Station was built on the site.
