= Terminal Hotel (Little Rock, Arkansas) =

Historic building in Little Rock, Arkansas, U.S.

- U.S. National Register of Historic Places
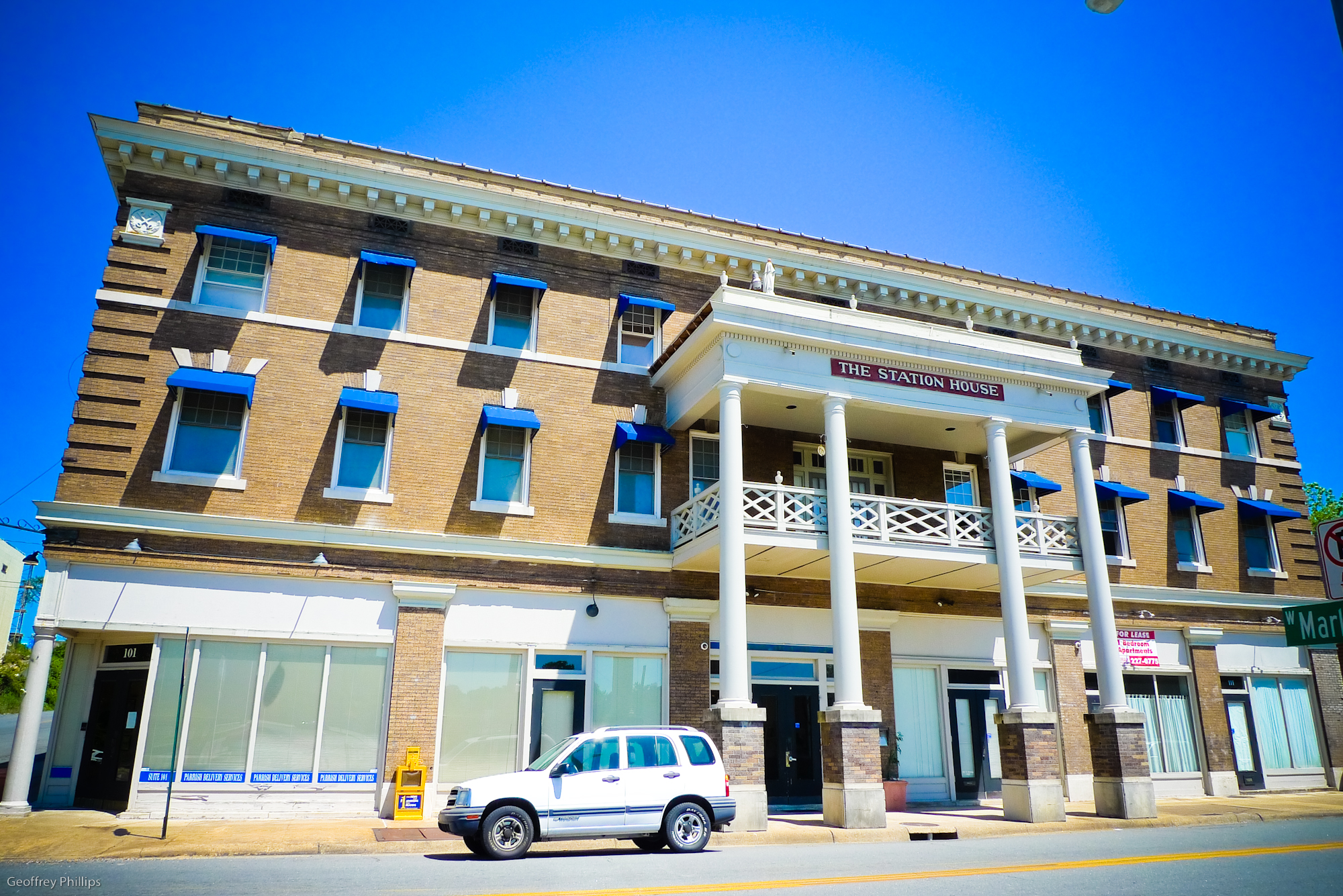
- The Terminal Hotel, now Station House, as it appeared in 2009

- Location within Arkansas Location within the United States
- Location: Victory and Markham Sts., Little Rock, Arkansas
- Coordinates: 34°45′0″N 92°17′8″W
- Area: less than one acre
- Built: 1908
- Architectural style: Classical Revival
- NRHP reference No.: 78003200
- Added to NRHP: November 17, 1978

The Terminal Hotel is a historic commercial building located on the southeast corner of Markham and Victory Streets in Little Rock, Arkansas. It is a three-story Classical Revival brick building, set across Victory Street from Little Rock Union Station. It was opened in March 1909 as a railroad hotel, serving both passengers and railroad employees for many years until hotel operations ended in the late 1960s. It was later purchased and converted into residential housing units.

The Terminal Hotel Company was incorporated in July 1908 and contracted with Little Rock architect Charles L. Thompson to design the structure. The ground floor was to be occupied with a barber shop, restaurant, drug store, hotel lobby and other accessories of hotel operation. The original Little Rock Union Depot structure included a hotel and restaurant operated by C.A. Pratt. Since the new Union Station was not going to include hotel accommodations in the building, the Terminal Hotel was intended as the replacement for those facilities. The proprietor of the Terminal Hotel was Miss Mary A. Crofton, who had been an employee of Pratt's Hotel and Restaurant for twenty years. The Terminal Hotel utilized a buff colored brick identical to that used for the new Union Station. The Terminal Hotel was opened for business on March 26, 1909, about six months before the new Union Station actually opened.

The building was listed on the National Register of Historic Places in 1978.

== See also ==
Arkansas Gazette newspaper; July 19, 1908 p4; March 28, 1909 p6

Arkansas Democrat newspaper; July 29, 1908 p1; March 26, 1909 p3.

- National Register of Historic Places listings in Little Rock, Arkansas
