= Majestic Hotel (Atlanta) =

Former hotel in Atlanta, Georgia

Coordinates: 33.758775°N 84.387376°W

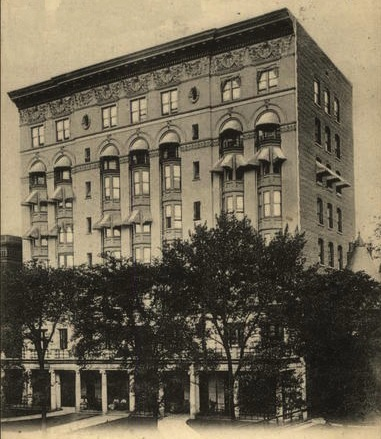
Majestic Hotel 1902, from a postcard

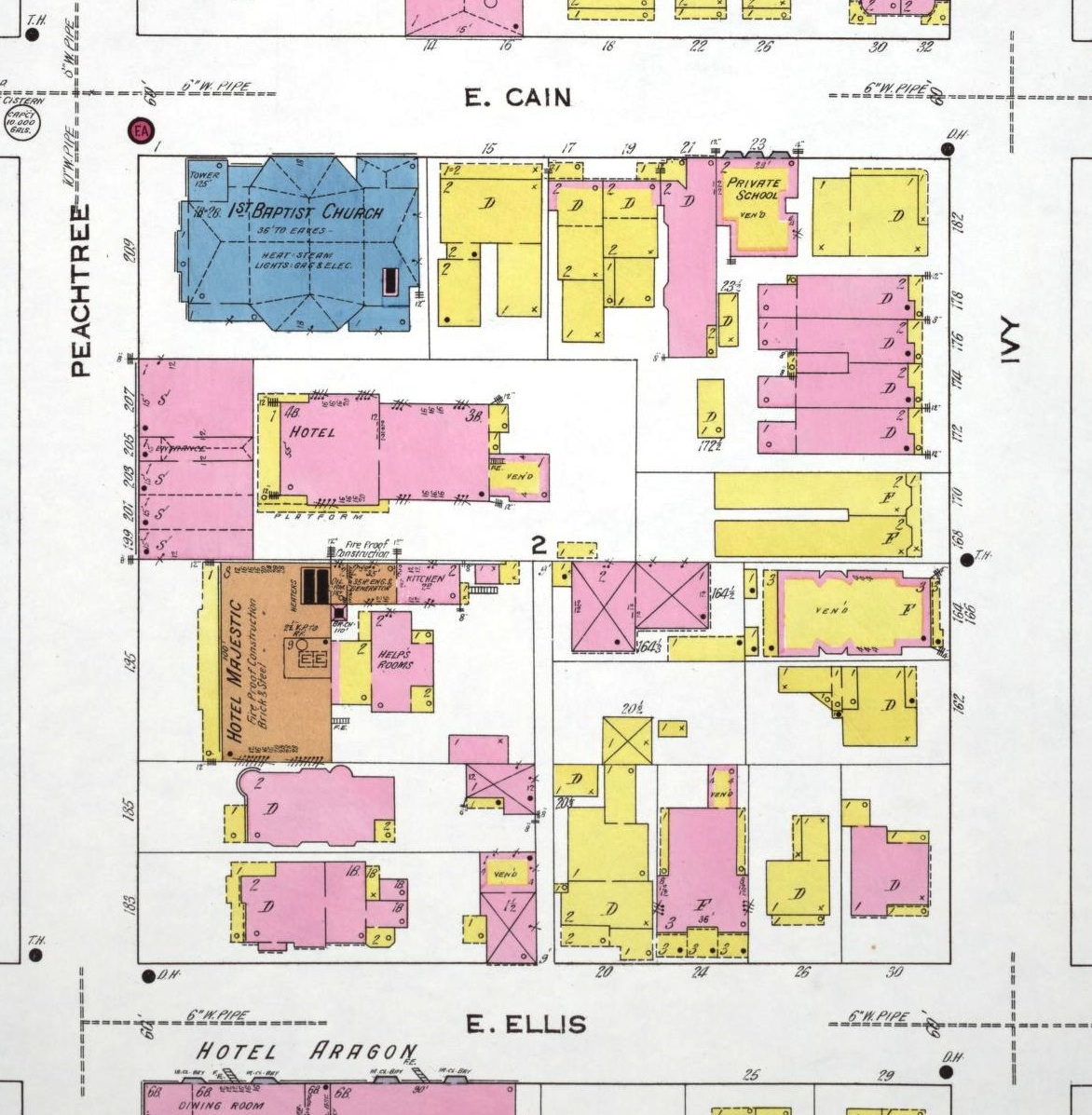
Majestic Hotel, location in block, 1911 Sanborn fire map

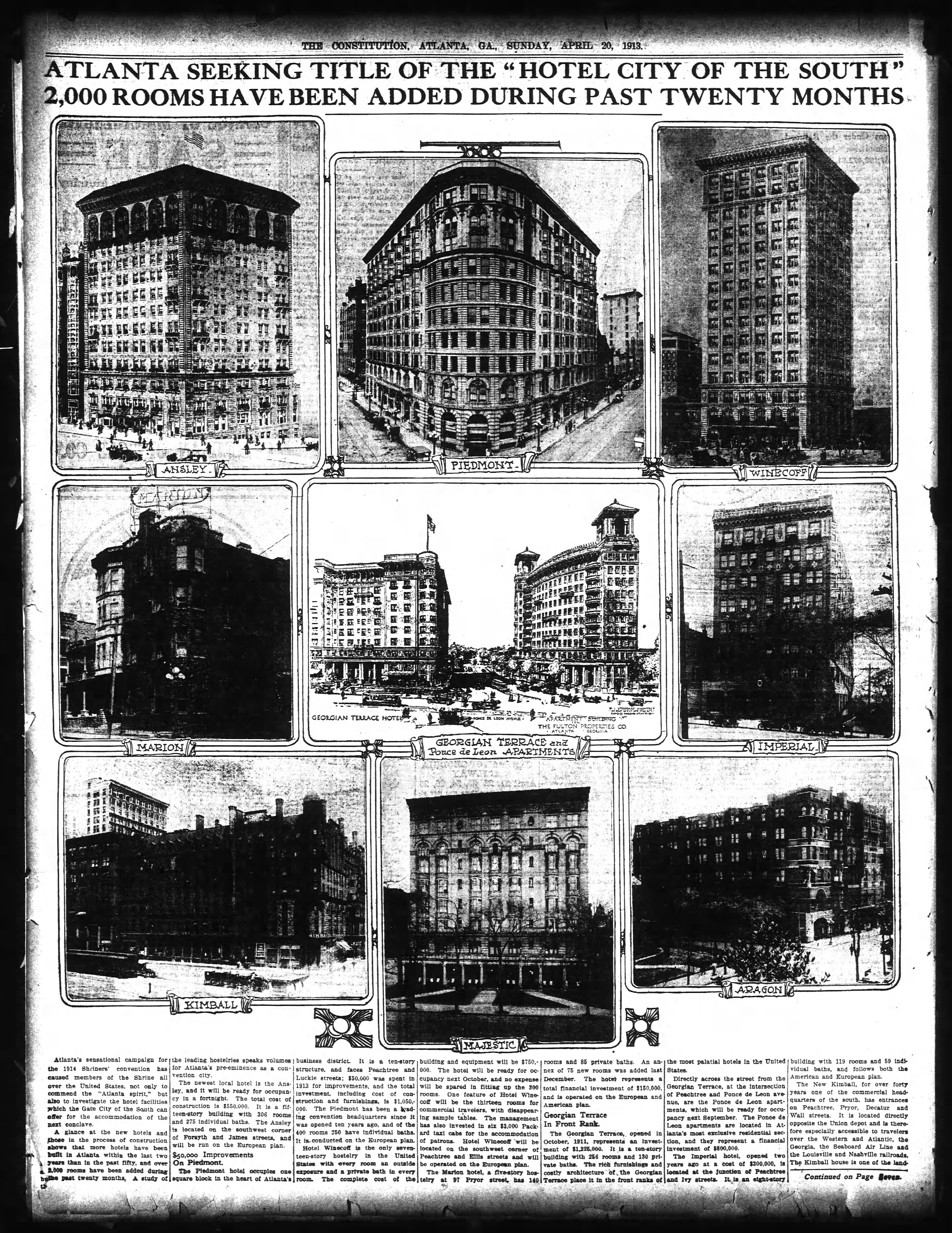
Majestic features in article from Atlanta Constitution of April 20, 1913 about city's hotels

The Majestic Hotel was built in 1898 and located at 195 Peachtree Street NW in Atlanta, between Ellis St. and Cain St. (now Andrew Young Int'l. Blvd.). It was a major addition to the city's hotel capacity at its completion in the 1890s. It cost between $80,000 and $100,000 to build, and was the first brick and steel fireproof construction in the city. A 1902 guidebook describes the Majestic as one of three chief first-class hotels in the city, together with the Kimball House and the Hotel Aragon. In 1927 the hotel was razed to make way for a two-story commercial structure. The site is part of the location of today's 191 Peachtree Tower.

== See also ==
- Hotels in Atlanta
