= Hotel Aragon =

Hotel in Atlanta, Georgia, US

Coordinates: 33.7582°N 84.3873°W

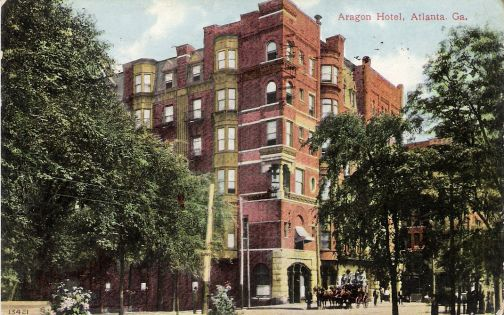
1910 postcard of the Hotel Aragon

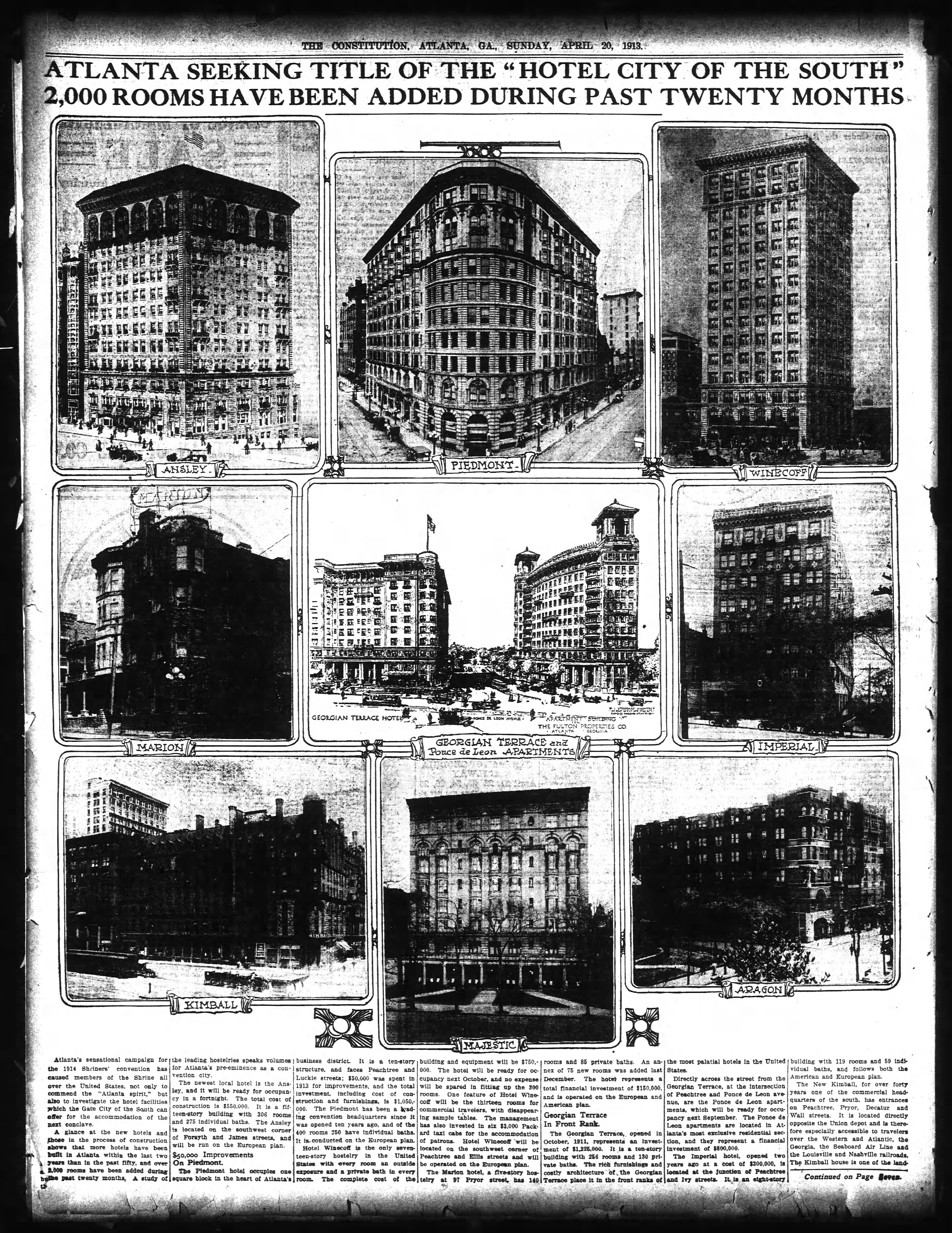
Hotel Aragon features in article from Atlanta Constitution of April 20, 1913 about city's hotels

The Hotel Aragon was a six-story, 125-room hotel at 169 Peachtree Street NE, at the southeast corner of Ellis Street in Atlanta, in what is today the Peachtree Center area of downtown. It was a major addition to the city's hotel capacity at its completion in 1892, cost $250,000, and was built and owned by George Washington Collier. It was the only major hotel in the city not adjacent to Union Station. A 1902 guidebook describes the Aragon as one of three first-class hotels in the city, together with the Kimball House and the Majestic Hotel.

In the late 1920s a project was started to raze the Aragon in order to build a Modernist 750-room hotel for the Dinkler Hotel Company. The plans by architect Francis Palmer Smith of firm Pringle & Smith showed "a proud monument of spirited Deco design, a Modernistic setback block rising twenty floors to a central tower". The project stalled. Instead, the hotel was razed to make way for the more modest Collier Building (1932), though still with Art Deco ornamentation. That building was in turn razed in the 1970s. The site is now occupied by an entrance to the MARTA Peachtree Center station and part of the Georgia Pacific Center.

== See also ==
- Hotels in Atlanta
