= Markham House (Atlanta) =

19th-century hotel in Atlanta, Georgia, US

Coordinates: 33°45′9″N 84°23′15″W

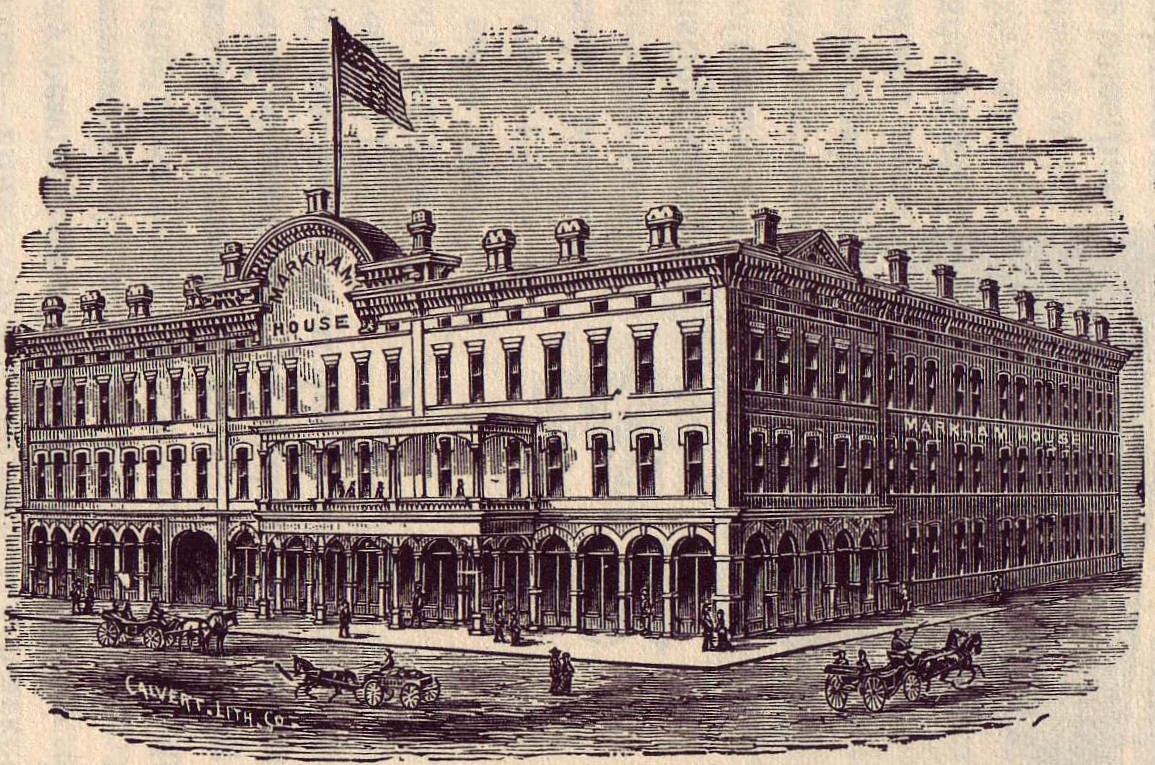
The Markham House across from Atlanta's main rail terminal

The Markham House was a 19th-century hotel located in Atlanta, Georgia.

Built by William Markham and opened 15 November 1875 with 107 rooms and central heat, it was a center of Atlanta's civic life, with the balcony serving as a platform for famous speaking guests recently arriving at the adjacent Union Station.

It burned in 1896 after Markham's death. Fire chief W.R. Joyner did his best to save the structure, but it was destroyed.
