= Hotel Row =

- Hotel Row Historic District
- U.S. National Register of Historic Places
- U.S. Historic district
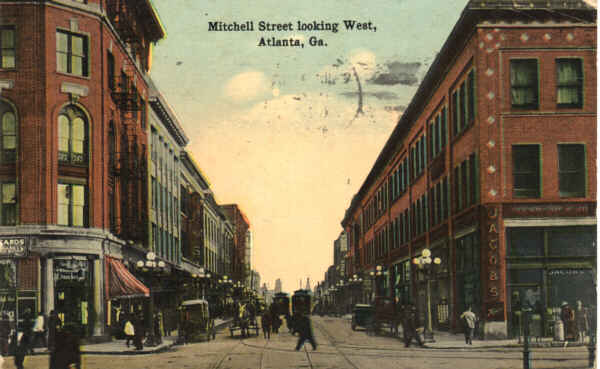
- Mitchell St., early 20th

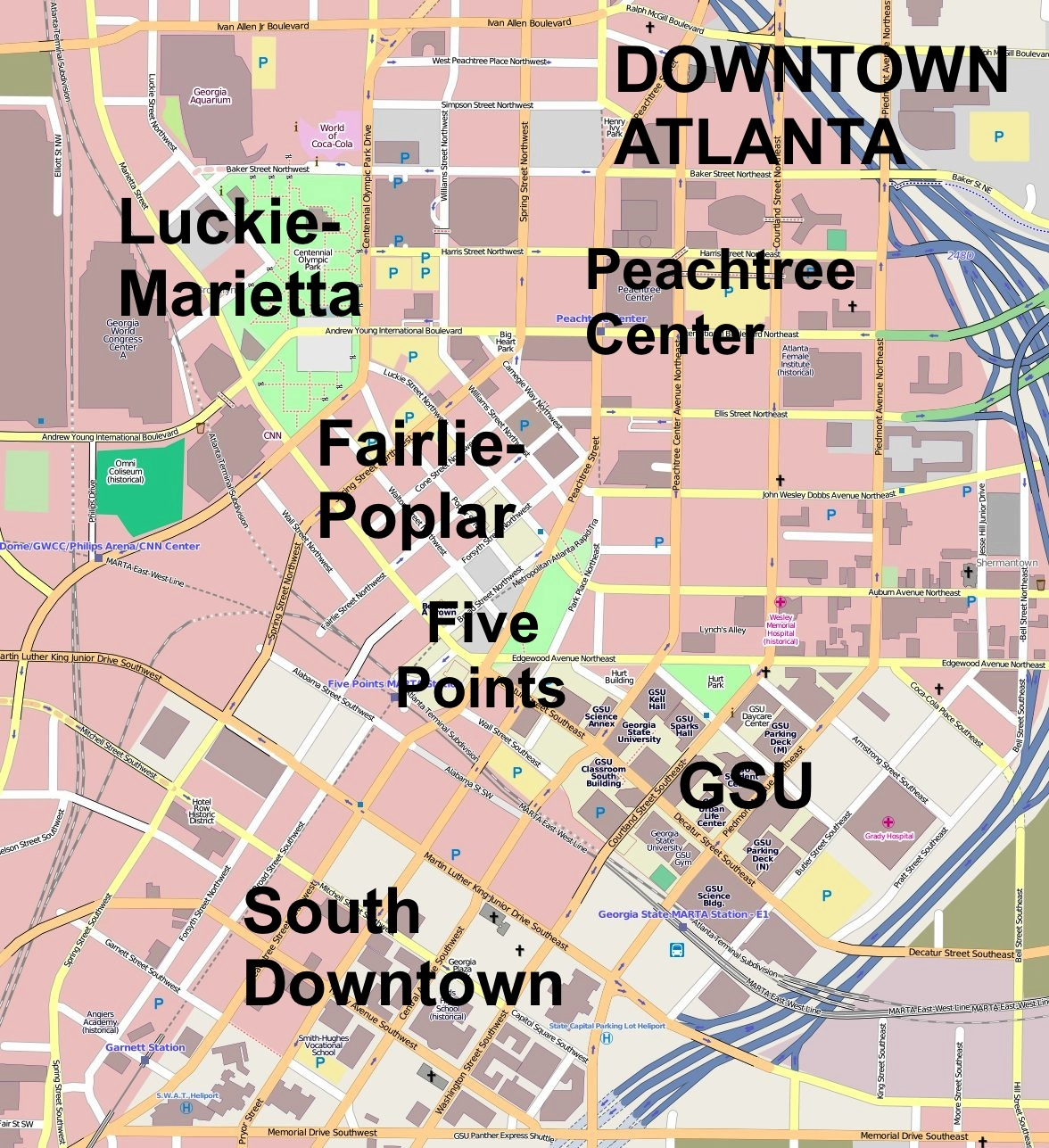
- Location within Downtown Atlanta Location within Georgia Location within the United States
- Location: 205--235 Mitchell St., Atlanta, Georgia
- Coordinates: 33°45′8″N 84°23′43″W
- Area: 2 acres (0.81 ha)
- Built: 1892–1908
- Architect: Bruce & Morgan; Willis F. Denny; George W. Laine
- Architectural style: Early commercial
- NRHP reference No.: 89000802
- Added to NRHP: July 20, 1989

Hotel Row is both a National Register and locally listed historic district consisting of one block of early 20th-century commercial buildings, three to four stories high, located on Mitchell Street west of Forsyth Street in the South Downtown district of Atlanta. The buildings were originally hotels with ground level retail shops built to serve the needs of passengers from Terminal Station, opened in 1905. The buildings are the most intact row of early 20th-century commercial structures in Atlanta's original business district. The decline of Hotel Row began in the 1920s due to the increased availability of automobile transportation and the construction of the Spring Street viaduct, which made getting to hotels in the northern part of the city easier. In the 1950s and 1960s, the increase in air travel led ultimately to the demolition of Terminal Station in 1971.

The district is architecturally significant because the structures that make up the block retain most of their original historic architectural character. Several structures were developed by Samuel Inman and Walker Inman, two of Atlanta's most prominent businessmen, and the majority of the structures were designed by the leading architects of the period. They typify the early 20th-century commercial structures once common in Atlanta but now rare because of extensive redevelopment.

== Buildings ==
Buildings in Hotel Row are:

Building	Year built	Address Mitchell St. (current)	Address Mitchell St. (pre-1926)	Architects	Notes
Concordia Hall	1892	201-209	35-43	Bruce & Morgan	Concordia Assn. would become the Standard Club
Gordon Hotel (form. Child's Hotel, Princeton Hotel)		211-215	45-49	Willis F. Denny	#215 Gordon Lofts
Commercial building	1908	217-221	51-53		
Scoville Hotel (form. Marion Hotel)	1908	223-225	55-57	George W. Laine	
The Factory Building	1908	227-231	59-63	George W. Laine	#227, Factory Lofts; #231 houses Lunacy Black Market restaurant
Sylvan Hotel (orig. known as "Terminal Hotel Annex"; also housed the Williams Hotel c. 1910)	1908 (permit issued)	233-235	65-67		#233 houses Sylvan Factory Partners

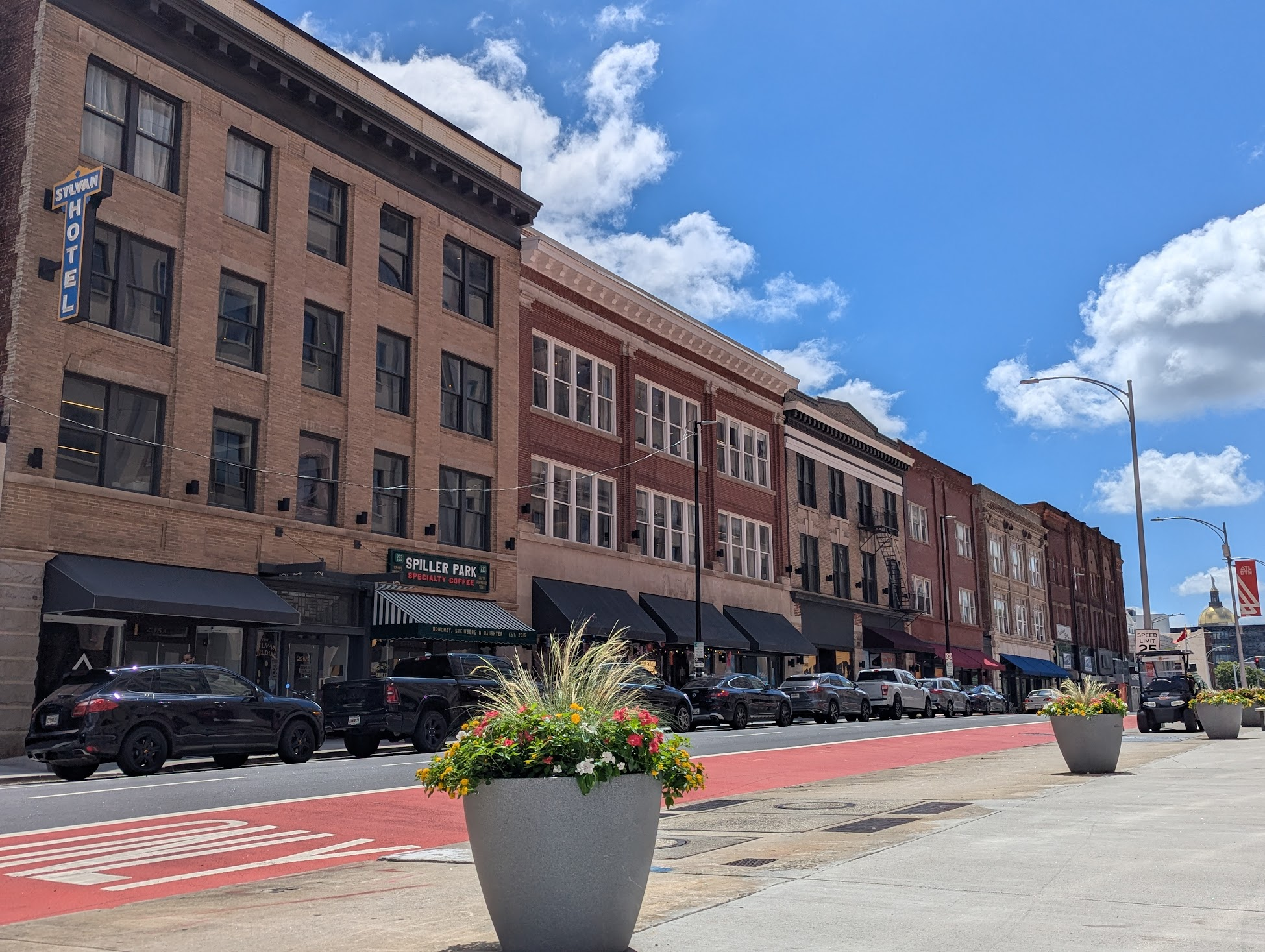
Hotel Row, Mitchell St., June 2026

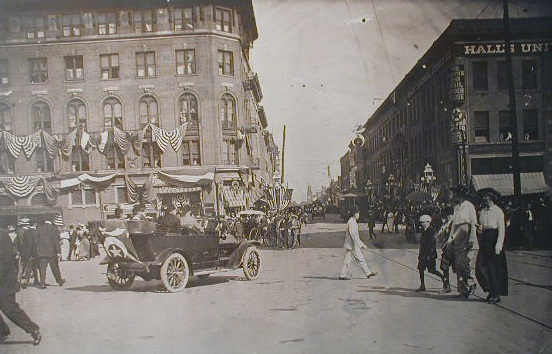
Mitchell St., early 20th century
