= Atlanta Hotel =

Former hotel in Atlanta, Georgia

Coordinates: 33°45′14″N 84°23′23″W

- Alternative names: Thompson's Hotel

General information
- Status: Destroyed
- Town or city: Atlanta
- Country: Georgia
- Owner: Joseph Thompson

The Atlanta Hotel, also known as Thompson's Hotel, was one of the original hotels in antebellum Atlanta, Georgia, United States. It stood at the northwest side of State Square, pre-war Atlanta's central square, on the northwest side of Pryor Street between Decatur Street (then Marietta Street) and what is now Wall Street (which before the war was the railroad track).

The hotel was run by Joseph Thompson. The future vice-president of the Confederate States of America, Alexander H. Stephens, was stabbed in 1848 on the hotel's steps ("piazza") by Judge Francis H. Cone over a political argument.

The hotel was destroyed during General Sherman's burning of Atlanta.

== See also ==
- Hotels in Atlanta
