= History of Atlanta =

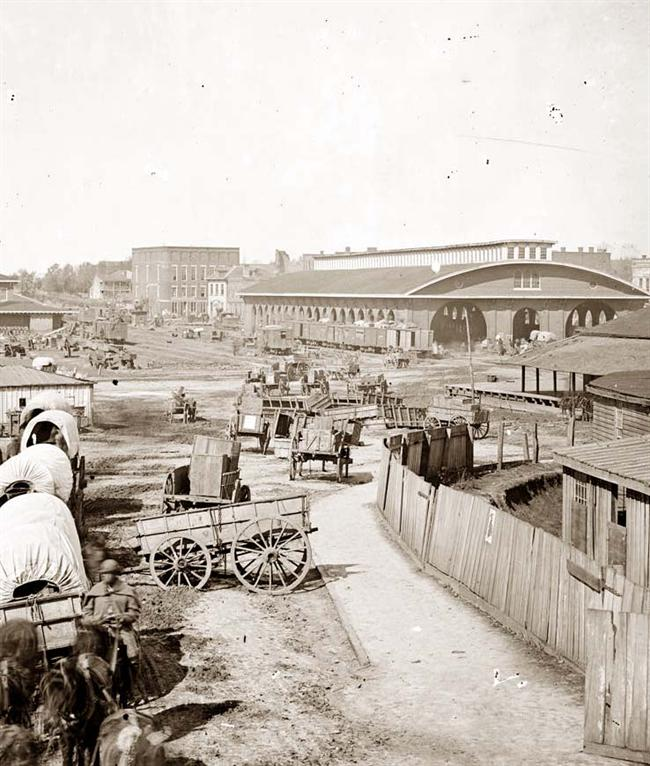
Antebellum Atlanta: State Square and the first Union Station

The history of Atlanta dates back to 1836, when Georgia decided to build a railroad to the U.S. Midwest and a location was chosen to be the line's terminus. The stake marking the founding of "Terminus" was driven into the ground in 1837 (called the Zero Mile Post). In 1839, homes and a store were built there and the settlement grew. Between 1845 and 1854, rail lines arrived from four different directions, and the rapidly growing town quickly became the rail hub for the entire Southern United States. During the American Civil War, Atlanta, as a distribution hub, became the target of a major Union campaign, and in 1864, Union William Sherman's troops set on fire and destroyed the city's assets and buildings, save for churches and hospitals. After the war, the population grew rapidly, as did manufacturing, while the city retained its role as a rail hub. Coca-Cola was launched here in 1886 and grew into an Atlanta-based world empire. Electric streetcars arrived in 1889, and the city added new "streetcar suburbs".

The city's elite black colleges were founded between 1865 and 1885, and despite disenfranchisement and the later imposition of Jim Crow laws in the 1910s, a prosperous black middle class and upper class emerged. By the early 20th century, "Sweet" Auburn Avenue was called "the most prosperous Negro street in the nation". In the 1950s, black people started moving into city neighborhoods that had previously kept them out, while Atlanta's first freeways enabled large numbers of whites to move to, and commute from, new suburbs. Atlanta was home to Martin Luther King Jr., and a major center for the Civil Rights Movement. Resulting desegregation occurred in stages over the 1960s. Slums were razed and the new Atlanta Housing Authority built public-housing projects.

From the mid-1960s to mid-'1970s, nine suburban malls opened, and the downtown shopping district declined, but just north of it, gleaming office towers and hotels rose, and in 1976, the new Georgia World Congress Center signaled Atlanta's rise as a major convention city. In 1973, the city elected its first black mayor, Maynard Jackson, and in ensuing decades, black political leaders worked successfully with the white business community to promote business growth, while still empowering black businesses. From the mid-1970s to mid-1980s most of the MARTA rapid transit system was built. While the suburbs grew rapidly, much of the city itself deteriorated and the city lost 21% of its population between 1970 and 1990.

In 1996, Atlanta hosted the Summer Olympics, for which new facilities and infrastructure were built. Hometown airline Delta continued to grow, and by 1998-1999, Atlanta's airport was the busiest in the world. Since the mid-1990s, gentrification has given new life to many of the city's intown neighborhoods. The 2010 census showed affluent black people leaving the city for newer exurban properties and growing suburban towns, younger whites moving back to the city, and a much more diverse metropolitan area with heaviest growth in the exurbs at its outer edges.

== Native American civilization: before 1836 ==
The region where Atlanta and its suburbs were built was originally Creek and Cherokee Native American territory. In 1813, the Creeks, who had been recruited by the British to assist them in the War of 1812, attacked and burned Fort Mims in southwestern Alabama. The conflict broadened and became known as the Creek War. In response, the United States built a string of forts along the Ocmulgee and Chattahoochee Rivers, including Fort Daniel on top of Hog Mountain near present-day Dacula, Georgia, and Fort Gilmer.

Fort Gilmer was situated next to an important Indian site called Standing Peachtree, a Creek Indian village. The site traditionally marked a Native American meeting place at the boundary between Creek and Cherokee lands, at the point where Peachtree Creek flows into the Chattahoochee. The fort was soon renamed Fort Peachtree. A road was built linking Fort Peachtree and Fort Daniel following the route of existing trails.

As part of the systematic removal of Native Americans from northern Georgia from 1802 to 1825, the Creek ceded the area that is now metro Atlanta in 1821. Four months later, the Georgia Land Lottery Act created five new counties in the area that would later become Atlanta. Dekalb County was created in 1822, from portions of Henry, Fayette, and Gwinnett Counties, and Decatur was created as its county seat the following year. As part of the land lottery, Archibald Holland received a grant for District 14, Land Lot 82: an area of 202.5 acres near the present-day Coca-Cola headquarters. Holland farmed the land and operated a blacksmith shop. However, the land was low-lying and wet, so his cattle often became mired in the mud. He left the area in 1833 to farm in Paulding County.

In 1830, an inn was established that became known as Whitehall due to the then-unusual fact that it had a coat of white paint, when most other buildings were of washed or natural wood. Later, Whitehall Street was built as the road from Atlanta to Whitehall. The Whitehall area was renamed West End in 1867 and is the oldest intact Victorian neighborhood of Atlanta.

In 1835, some leaders of the Cherokee Nation ceded their territory to the United States without the consent of the majority of the Cherokee people in exchange for land out west under the Treaty of New Echota, an act that led to the Trail of Tears.

== From railroad terminus to Atlanta: 1836–1860 ==
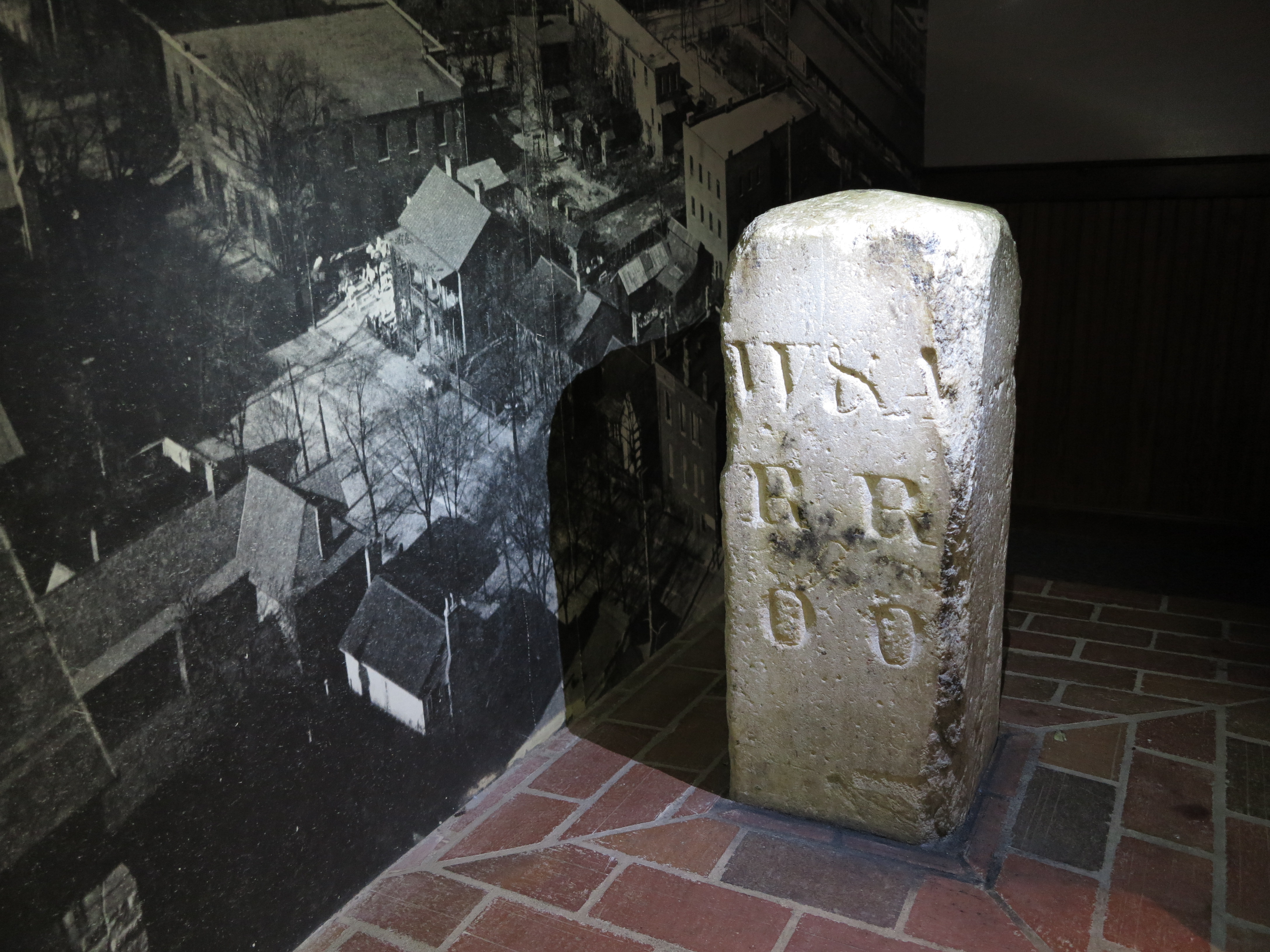
Western & Atlantic Railroad's Zero Mile Post

In 1836, the Georgia General Assembly voted to build the Western and Atlantic Railroad to provide a link between the port of Savannah and the Midwest. The initial route of that state-sponsored project was to run from Chattanooga, Tennessee, to a spot east of the Chattahoochee River, in present-day Fulton County. The plan was to eventually link up with the Georgia Railroad from Augusta, and with the Macon and Western Railroad, which ran between Macon and Savannah. A U.S. Army engineer, Colonel Stephen Harriman Long, was asked to recommend the location where the Western and Atlantic line would terminate. He surveyed various possible routes, then in the autumn of 1837, drove a stake into the ground between what are now Forsyth Street and Andrew Young International Boulevard, about three or four blocks northwest of today's Five Points. The zero milepost was later placed to mark that spot.

In 1839, John Thrasher built homes and a general store in this vicinity, and the settlement was nicknamed Thrasherville. A marker identifies the location of Thrasherville at 104 Marietta Street, NW, in front of the State Bar of Georgia Building, between Spring and Cone Streets. (33°45.409′N 84°23.542′W) At this point, Thrasher built the Monroe Embankment, an earthen embankment to carry the Monroe Railway to meet the W&A at the terminus. This is the oldest existing man-made structure in downtown Atlanta.

In 1842, the planned terminus location was moved, four blocks southeast (two to three blocks southeast of Five Points), to what would become State Square, on Wall Street between Central Avenue and Pryor Street. (33°45.141′N 84°23.317′W). At this location, the zero milepost can now be found, adjacent to the southern entrance of Underground Atlanta. As the settlement grew, it became known as Terminus, literally meaning "end of the line". By 1842, the settlement at Terminus had six buildings and 30 residents.

Meanwhile, settlement began at what became the Buckhead section of Atlanta, several miles north of today's downtown. In 1838, Henry Irby started a tavern and grocery at what became the intersection of Paces Ferry and Roswell Roads.

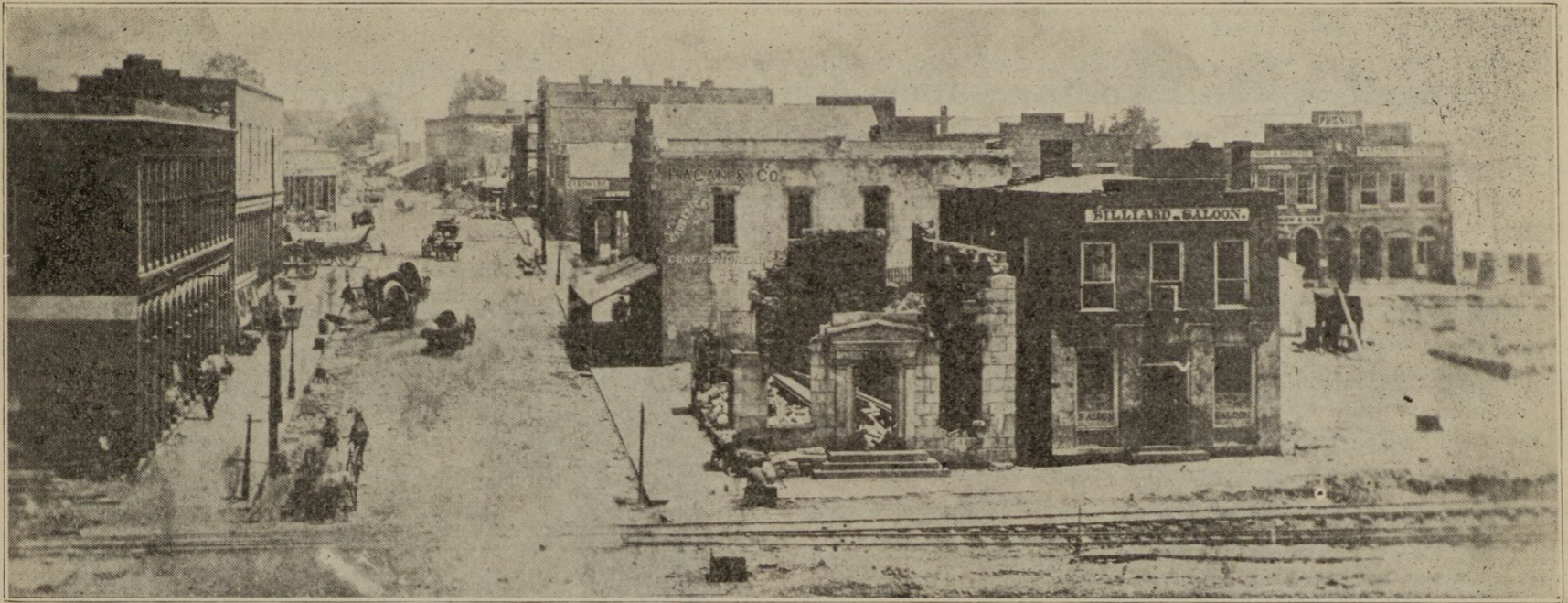
The city in 1847

In 1842, when a two-story brick depot was built, the locals asked that the settlement of Terminus be called Lumpkin, after Governor Wilson Lumpkin. Gov. Lumpkin asked them to name it after his young daughter (Martha Atalanta Lumpkin) instead, and Terminus became Marthasville; it was officially incorporated on December 23, 1843. In 1845, the chief engineer of the Georgia Railroad (J. Edgar Thomson) suggested that Marthasville be renamed "Atlantica-Pacifica", which was quickly shortened to "Atlanta". Wilson Lumpkin seems to have supported the change, reporting that Martha's middle name was Atalanta.

The residents approved the name change, apparently undaunted by the fact that not a single train had yet visited. Act 109 of the Georgia General Assembly enacted the name change, which was approved December 26, 1845, and signed into law 3 days afterward. In the same act, the election precinct known as the Whitehall precinct (in the home of Charner Humphries) was also changed to Atlanta. In 1847, the city's charter was approved, elections were held, and the first slate of councilmen and the mayor took office in January 1848.

AN ACT to change the name of Marthasville, in DeKalb County, to that of Atlanta; also, to change the election precinct now held at the house of Charner Humphries, known as the Whitehall precinct, to Atlanta.

- SECTION 1. Be it enacted by the Senate and House of Representatives of the State of Georgia, in General Assembly met, and it is hereby enacted by the authority of the same, That from and after the passage of this act, the name of Marthasville, in DeKalb county, shall be changed to that of Atlanta.
- SEC. 2. And be it further enacted by the authority aforesaid, That the election precinct now established by law at the house of Charner Humphries, known as the Whitehall precinct, be and the same is hereby changed to Atlanta.
- SEC. 3. And be it further enacted by the authority aforesaid, That all laws and parts of laws militating against this act, be and the same are hereby repealed.
- Approved, December 26, 1845

— Georgia General Assembly

=== Growth and development into a regional rail hub ===
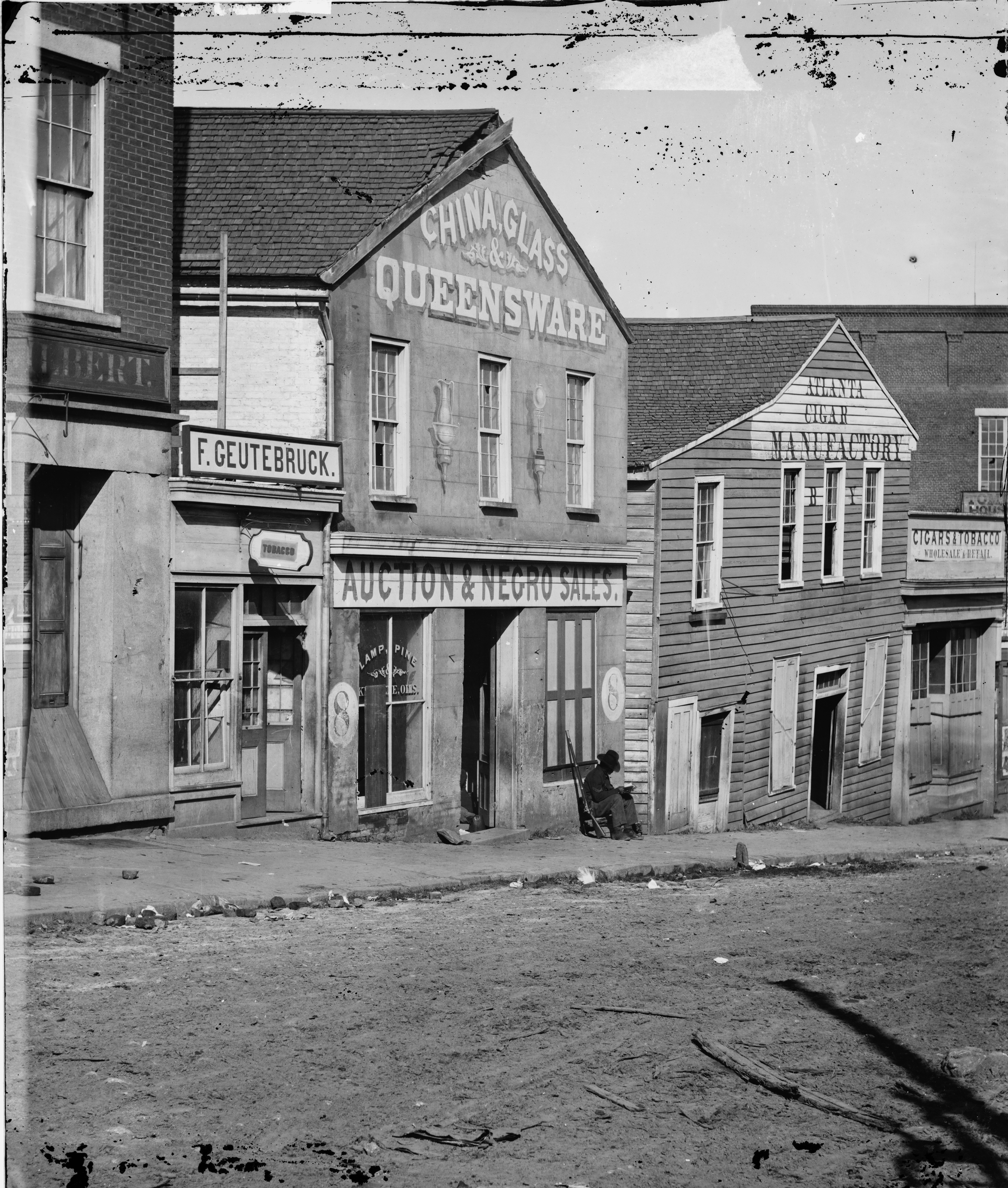
Storefronts including Crawford, Frazer & Co.'s slave market on Whitehall Street, 1864

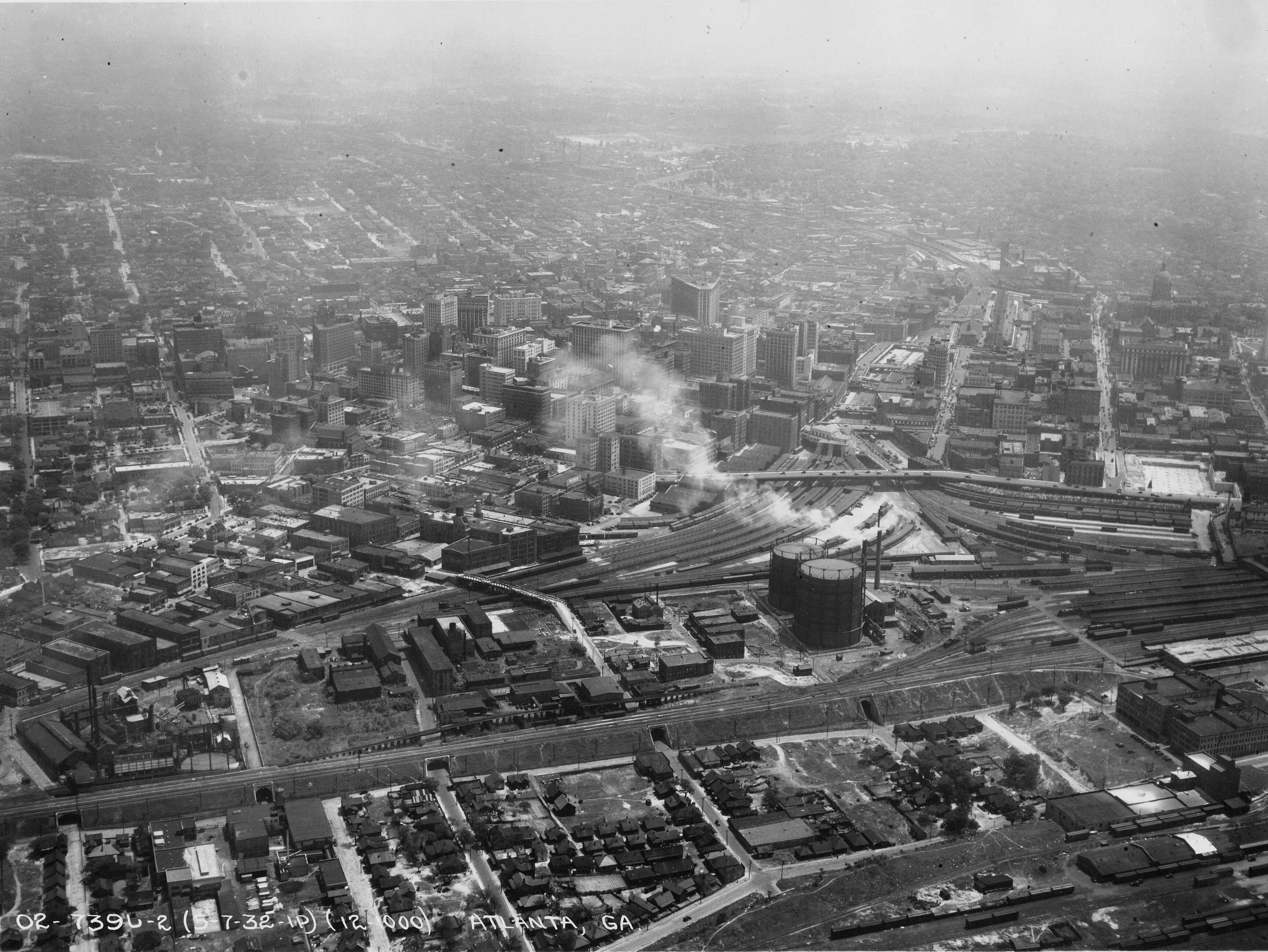
Railyards in Atlanta (1932)

The first Georgia Railroad freight and passenger trains from Augusta (to the east of Atlanta), arrived in September 1845 and in that year the first hotel, the Atlanta Hotel, was opened. The railroad was the chief stimulus to the town's growth, with several lines being added.

In 1846, a second railroad company, the Macon & Western (orig. "Monroe Railroad"), completed tracks to Terminus/Atlanta, connecting the little settlement with Macon to the south and Savannah to the southeast. The town then began to boom. In late 1846, the Washington Hall hotel was opened. By 1847, the population had reached 2,500. In 1848, the town elected its first mayor and appointed its first town marshal, German M. Lester, coinciding with the first homicide and the first jail built. A new city council approved the building of wooden sidewalks and banned conducting business on Sundays. In 1849, Atlanta's third and largest antebellum hotel was built, the Trout House, and the Daily Intelligencer became the town's first successful daily newspaper. In 1850 Oakland Cemetery was founded southeast of town, where it remains today within the city limits.

In 1851, a third rail line, the Western and Atlantic Railroad - for which the site of Atlanta had been identified as a terminus - finally arrived, connecting Atlanta to Chattanooga in the northwest and opening up Georgia to trade with the Tennessee and Ohio River Valleys, and the American Midwest. The union depot was completed in 1853 on State Square. That year, the depot's architect, Edward A. Vincent, also delivered Atlanta's first official map to the city council.

Fulton County was established in 1853 from the western section of DeKalb, and in 1854, a combination Fulton County Court House and Atlanta City Hall was built– which would be razed 30 years later to make way for today's State Capitol building. (After the Civil War, the Georgia General Assembly decided to move the state capital from Milledgeville to Atlanta.)

In 1854, a fourth rail line, the Atlanta and LaGrange Rail Road (later Atlanta & West Point Railroad) arrived, connecting Atlanta with LaGrange, Georgia, to the southwest, sealing Atlanta's role as a rail hub for the entire South, with lines to the northwest, east, southeast, and southwest.

By 1855, the town had grown to 6,025 residents and had a bank, a daily newspaper, a factory to build freight cars, a new brick depot, property taxes, a gasworks, gas street lights, a theater, a medical college, and juvenile delinquency.

=== Manufacturing and commerce ===
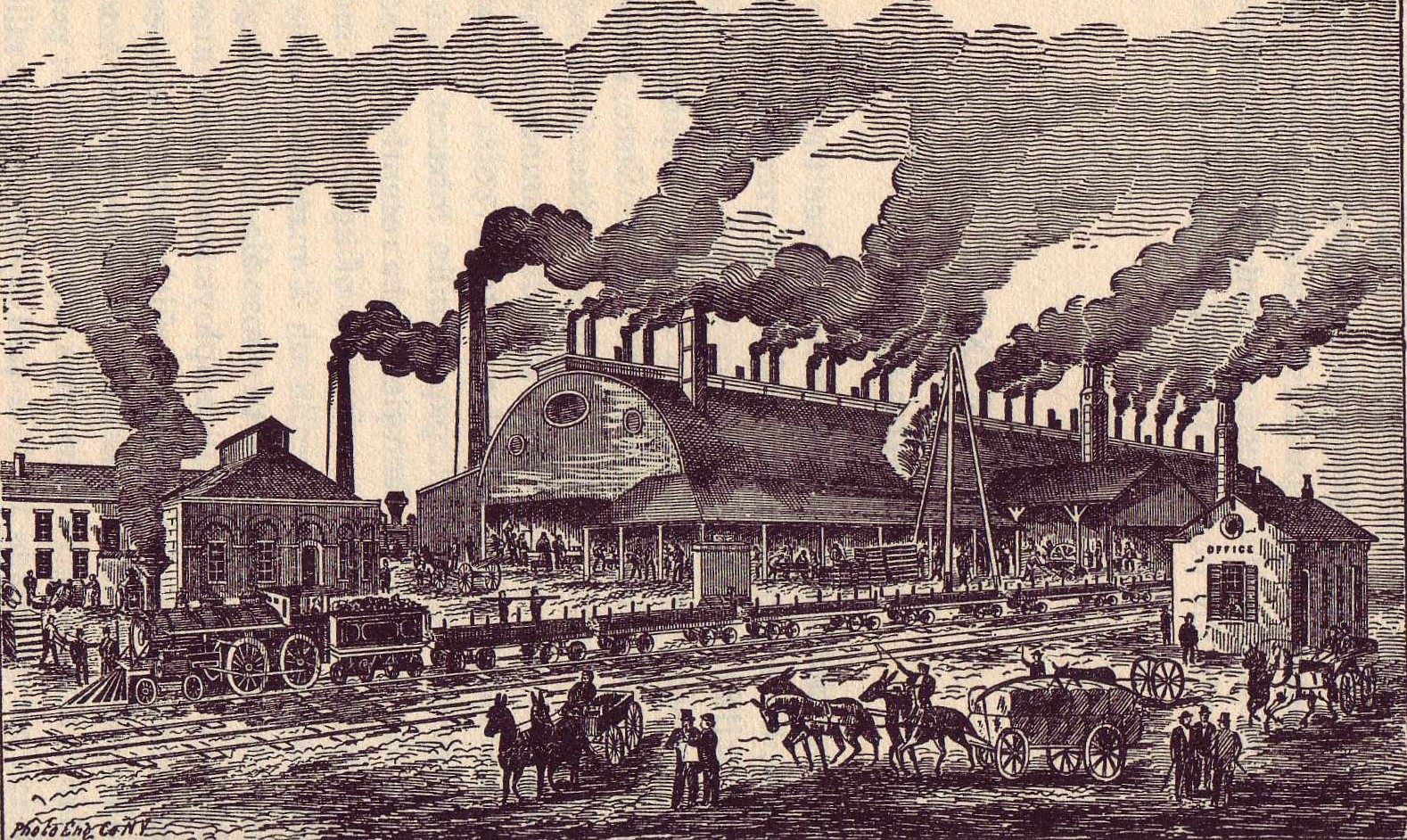
Atlanta (Confederate) Rolling Mill, 1858-1864

The first true manufacturing establishment was opened in 1844, when Jonathan Norcross, who later became mayor of Atlanta, arrived in Marthasville and built a sawmill. Richard Peters, Lemuel Grant, and John Mims built a three-story flour mill, which was used as a pistol factory during the Civil War. In 1848, Austin Leyden started the town's first foundry and machine shop, which was later the Atlanta Machine Works.

The Atlanta Rolling Mill (later the "Confederate" Rolling Mill) was built in 1858 near Oakland Cemetery. It soon became the South's second-most productive rolling mill. During the American Civil War it rolled out cannon, iron rail, and 2-inch-thick (51 mm) sheets of iron to clad the CSS Virginia for the Confederate navy. The mill was destroyed by the Union Army in 1864.

The city became a busy center for cotton distribution. As an example, in 1859, the Georgia Railroad alone sent 3,000 empty rail cars to the city to be loaded with cotton.

By 1860, the city had four large machine shops, two planing mills, three tanneries, two shoe factories, a soap factory, and clothing factories employing 75 people.

=== Slavery in antebellum Atlanta ===
In 1850, out of 2,572 people, 493 were enslaved African Americans, and 18 were free blacks, for a total black population of 20%. The black proportion of Atlanta's population became much higher after the Civil War, when freed slaves came to Atlanta in search of opportunity.

Several slave auction houses were in the town, which advertised in the newspapers and many of which also traded in manufactured goods.

== Civil War and Reconstruction: 1861–1871 ==
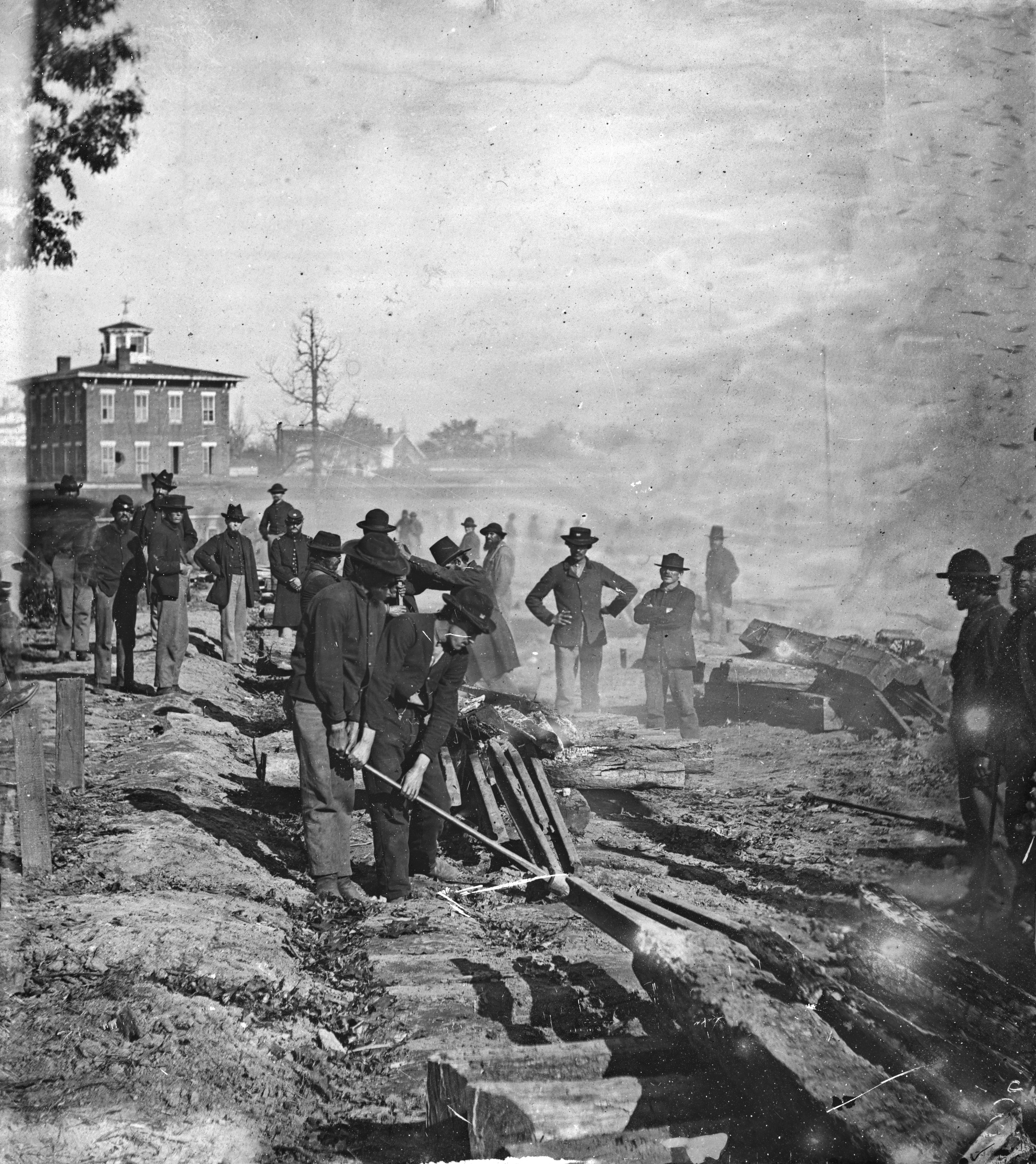
Sherman's army destroying rail infrastructure in Atlanta, 1864

=== Civil War: 1861–1865 ===
During the American Civil War, Atlanta served as an important railroad and military supply hub. (See also: Atlanta in the Civil War.) In 1864, the city became the target of a major Union invasion (the setting for the 1939 film Gone with the Wind). The area now covered by Atlanta was the scene of several battles, including the Battle of Peachtree Creek, the Battle of Atlanta, and the Battle of Ezra Church. General Sherman cut the last supply line to Atlanta at the Battle of Jonesboro fought on August 31 – September 1.

With all of his supply lines cut, Confederate General John Bell Hood was forced to abandon Atlanta. On the night of September 1, his troops marched out of the city to Lovejoy, Georgia. General Hood ordered that the 81 rail cars filled with ammunition and other military supplies be destroyed. The resulting fire and explosions were heard for miles. The next day, Mayor James Calhoun surrendered the city, and on September 7 Sherman ordered the civilian population to evacuate. He then ordered Atlanta burned to the ground on November 11 in preparation for his punitive march south.

After a plea by the Bishops of the Episcopal and Catholic churches in Atlanta, Sherman did not burn the city's churches or hospitals. The remaining war resources were then destroyed in the aftermath in Sherman's March to the Sea. The fall of Atlanta was a critical point in the Civil War. Its much publicized fall gave confidence to the Northerners. Together with the Battle of Mobile Bay, the fall of Atlanta led to the re-election of Abraham Lincoln and the eventual surrender of the Confederacy.

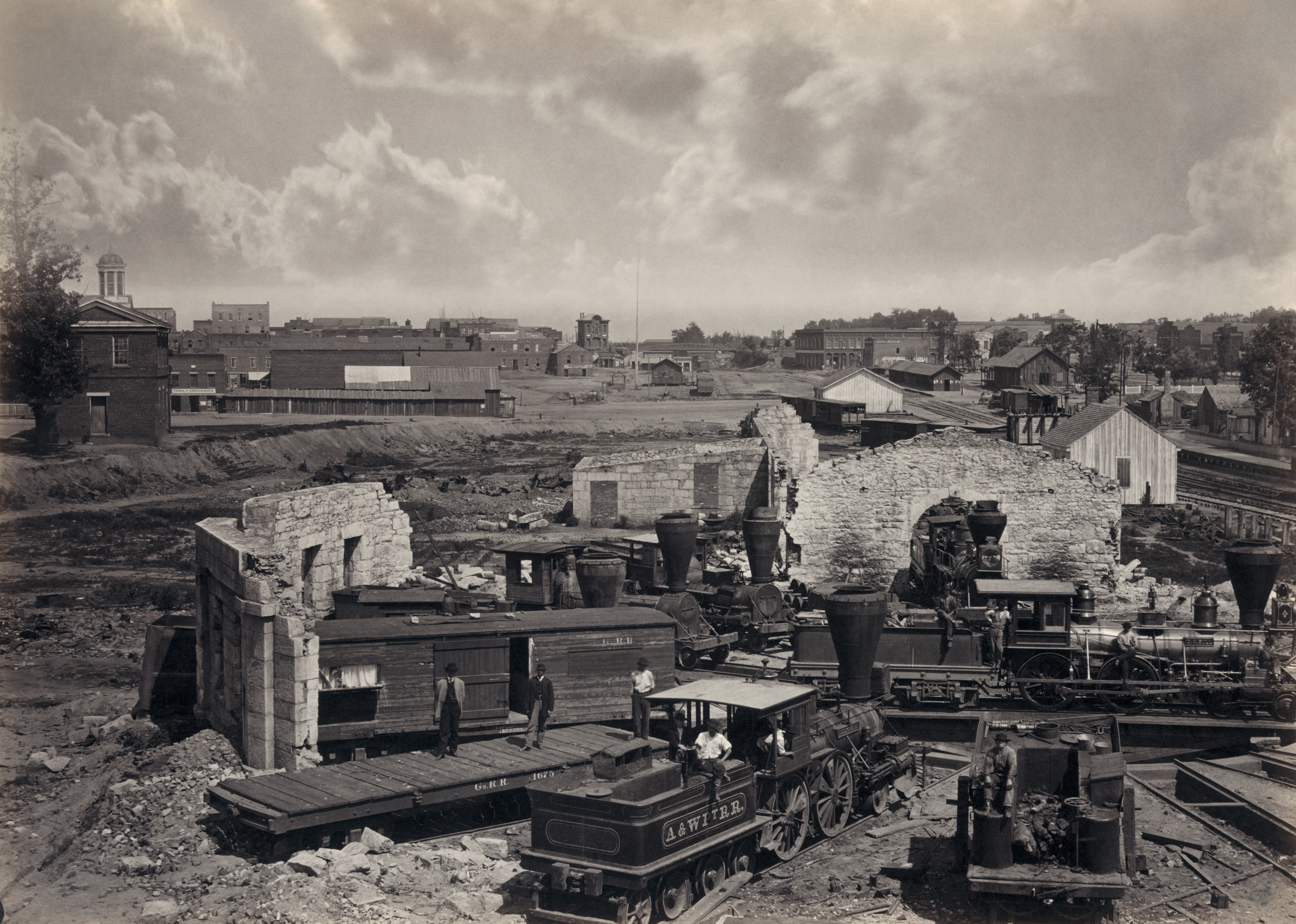
Roundhouse following its destruction during the Atlanta campaign, 1866.

=== Reconstruction: 1865–1871 ===
The city emerged from the ashes – hence the city's symbol, the phoenix – and was gradually rebuilt, as its population increased rapidly after the war. Atlanta received migrants from surrounding counties and states: from 1860 to 1870 Fulton County more than doubled in population, from 14,427 to 33,446. In a pattern seen across the South after the Civil War, many freedmen moved from plantations to towns or cities for work, including Atlanta; Fulton County went from 20.5% black in 1860 to 45.7% black in 1870.

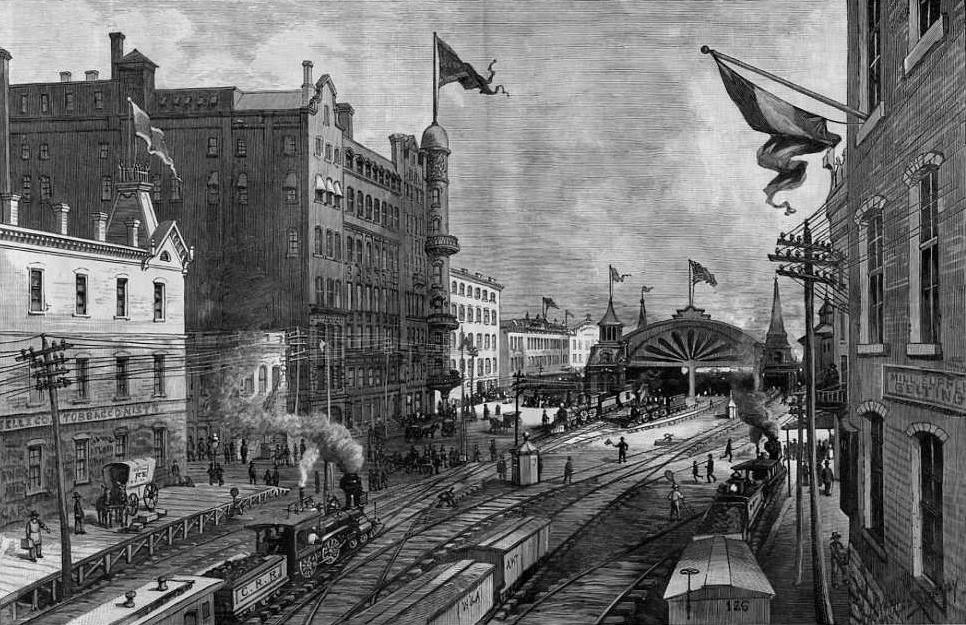
Atlanta, Georgia -- the Commercial Centre, 1887

Food supplies were erratic due to poor harvests, which were a result of the turmoil in the agricultural labor supply after emancipation of the slaves. Many refugees were destitute without even proper clothing or shoes; the AMA helped fill the gap with food, shelter, and clothing, and the federally sponsored Freedmen's Bureau also offered much help, though erratically.

The destruction of the housing stock by the Union army, together with the massive influx of refugees, resulted in a severe housing shortage. Some 1/8-acre (510 m^{2}) to 1/4-acre (1,000 m^{2}) lots with a small house rented for $5 per month, while those with a glass pane rented for $20. High rents rather than laws led to de facto segregation, with most black people settling in three shantytown areas at the city's edge. There, housing was substandard; an AMA missionary remarked that many houses were "rickety shacks" rented at inflated rates. Two of the three shantytowns sat in low-lying areas, prone to flooding and sewage overflows, which resulted in outbreaks of disease in the late 19th century. A shantytown named Tight Squeeze developed at Peachtree at what is now 10th Street in Midtown Atlanta. It was infamous for vagrancy, desperation, and robberies of merchants transiting the settlement.

A smallpox epidemic hit Atlanta in December 1865, with few doctors or hospital facilities to help. Another epidemic hit in fall, 1866; hundreds died.

Construction created many new jobs, and employment boomed. Atlanta soon became the industrial and commercial center of the South. From 1867 until 1888, U.S. Army soldiers occupied McPherson Barracks (later renamed Fort McPherson) in southwest Atlanta to ensure Reconstruction-era reforms. In 1868, Atlanta became the Georgia state capital, taking over from Milledgeville.

=== Center of black education ===
Atlanta quickly became a center of black education. Atlanta University was established in 1865, the forerunner of Morehouse College in 1867, Clark University in 1869, Spelman College in 1881, and Morris Brown College in 1881. This was one of several factors aiding the establishment of one of the nation's oldest and best-established African-American elite in Atlanta.

== Gate City of the New South: 1872-1905 ==
=== The New South ===
Henry W. Grady, the editor of the Atlanta Constitution, promoted the city to investors as a city of the "New South", by which he meant a diversification of the economy away from agriculture, and a shift from the "Old South" attitudes of slavery and rebellion. As part of the effort to modernize the South, Grady and many others also supported the creation of the Georgia School of Technology (now the Georgia Institute of Technology), which was founded on the city's northern outskirts in 1885. With Grady's support, the Confederate Soldiers' Home was built in 1889.

In 1880, Sister Cecilia Carroll, RSM, and three companions traveled from Savannah, Georgia to Atlanta to minister to the sick. With just 50 cents in their collective purse, the sisters opened the Atlanta Hospital, the first medical facility in the city after the Civil War. This later became known as Saint Joseph's Hospital.

=== Expansion and the first planned suburbs ===
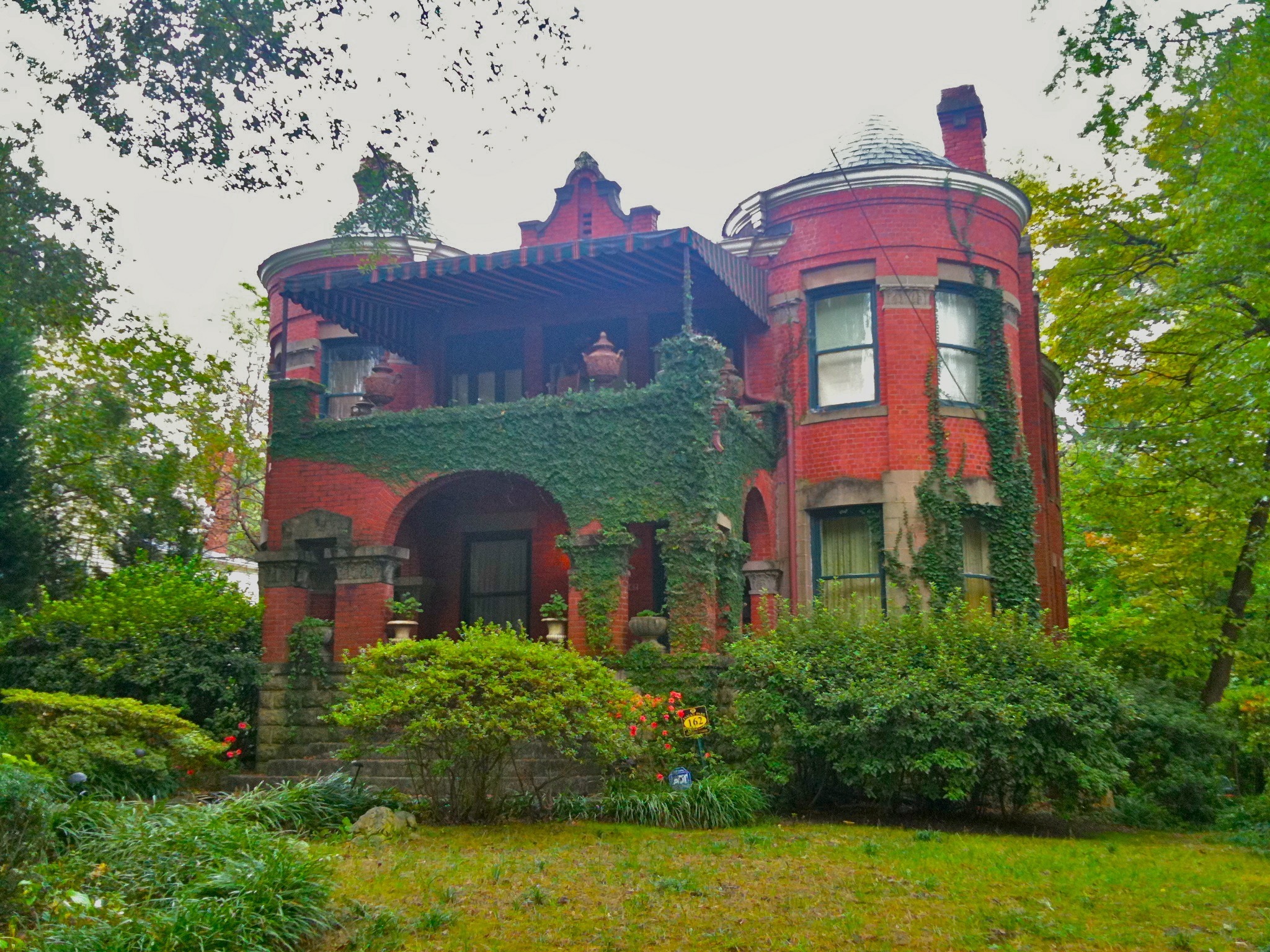
Inman Park, one of Atlanta's first planned garden suburbs

Starting in 1871, horse-drawn, and later, starting in 1888, electric streetcars fueled real estate development and the city's expansion. Washington Street south of downtown and Peachtree Street north of the central business district became wealthy residential areas.

In the 1890s, West End became the suburb of choice for the city's elite, but Inman Park, planned as a harmonious whole, soon overtook it in prestige. Peachtree Street's mansions reached ever further north into what is now Midtown Atlanta, including Amos G. Rhodes' (founder of the Rhodes Furniture Company in 1875) mansion, Rhodes Hall, which can still be visited.

Atlanta surpassed Savannah as Georgia's largest city by 1880.

=== Disenfranchisement of black people ===
As Atlanta grew, ethnic and racial tensions mounted. Late 19th- and early 20th-century immigration added a very small number of new Europeans to the mix. After Reconstruction, whites had used a variety of tactics, including militias and legislation, to re-establish political and social supremacy throughout the South. Starting with a poll tax in 1877, by the turn of the century, Georgia passed a variety of legislation that completed the disfranchisement of black people. Not even college-educated men could vote. Nonetheless, African Americans in Atlanta had been developing their own businesses, institutions, churches, and a strong, educated middle class. Meanwhile, the 2nd Ku Klux Klan era, (1915–1944) headed by William J. Simmons, and the 3rd Ku Klux Klan era, (1946–present) headed by Dr. Samuel Green, both started off in Atlanta.

=== Coca-Cola ===
The identities of Atlanta and Coca-Cola have been intertwined since 1886, when John Pemberton developed the soft drink in response to Atlanta and Fulton County going "dry". The first sales were at Jacob's Pharmacy in Atlanta. Asa Griggs Candler acquired a stake in Pemberton's company in 1887 and incorporated it as the Coca Cola Company in 1888. In 1892, Candler incorporated a second company, The Coca-Cola Company, the current corporation. By the time of its 50th anniversary, the drink had reached the status of a national icon in the USA. Coca-Cola's world headquarters have remained in Atlanta ever since. In 1991, the company opened the World of Coca-Cola, which has remained one of the city's top visitor attractions.

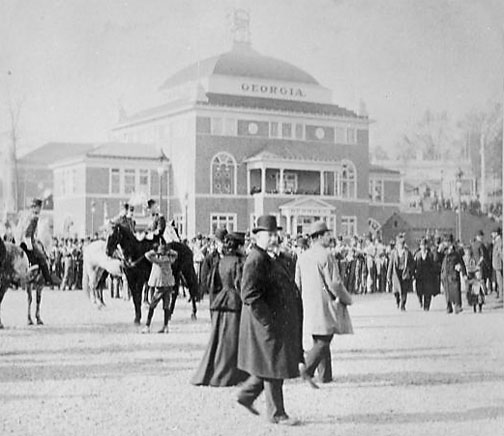
President Cleveland at the opening of the Cotton States and International Exposition

=== Cotton States Expo and Booker T. Washington speech ===
In 1895, the Cotton States and International Exposition was held at what is now Piedmont Park. Nearly 800,000 visitors attended the event. The exposition was designed to promote the region to the world and showcase products and new technologies, as well as to encourage trade with Latin America. The exposition featured exhibits from several states, including various innovations in agriculture and technology. President Grover Cleveland presided over the opening of the exposition, but the event is best remembered for the both hailed and criticized "Atlanta Compromise" speech given by Booker T. Washington in which Southern black people would work meekly and submit to white political rule, while Southern whites guaranteed that black people would receive basic education and due process in law.

== Streetcar suburbs and World War II: 1906–1945 ==
=== 1906 race riot ===
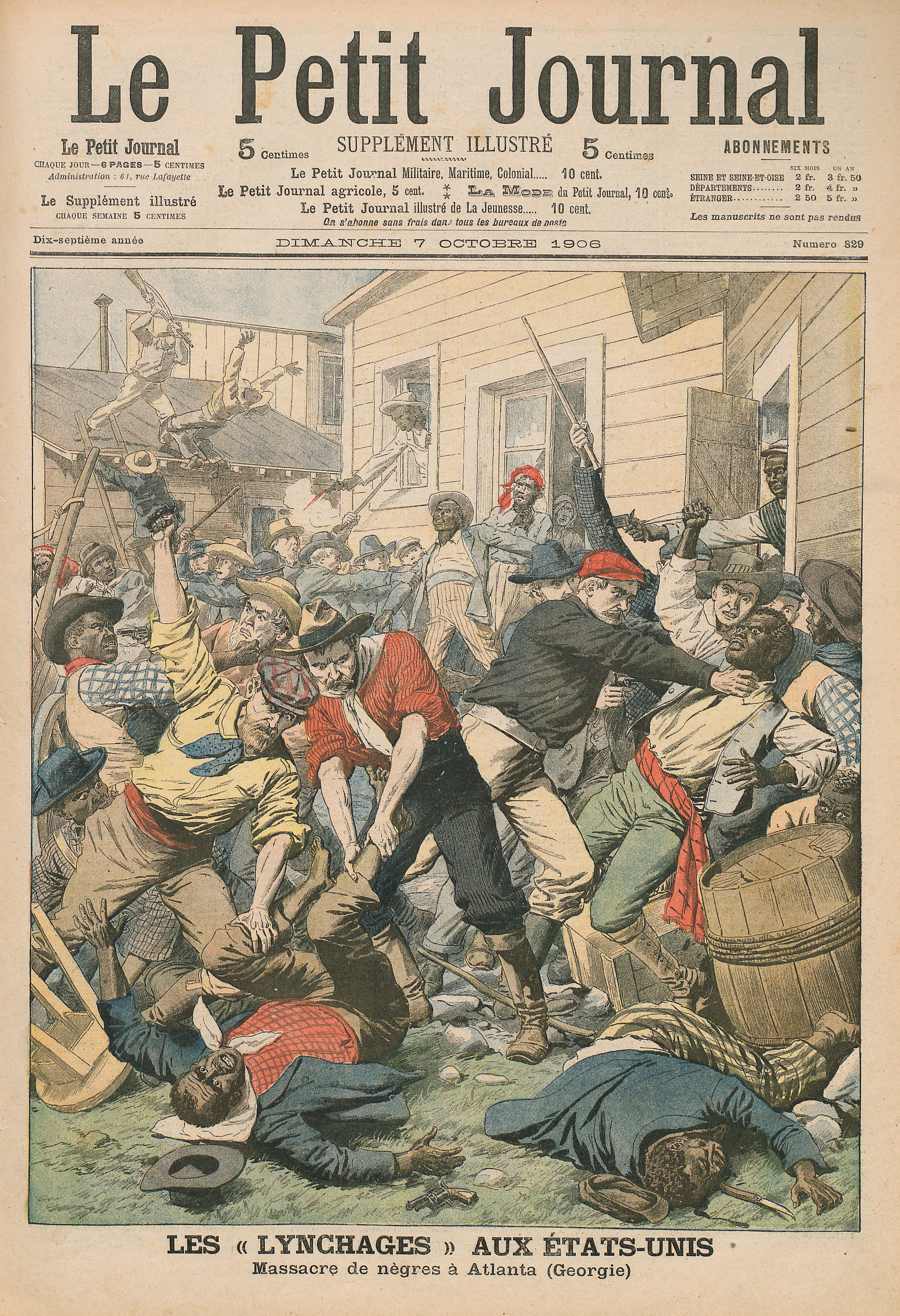
The cover of French magazine Le Petit Journal in October 1906 depicting the Atlanta race riot

Competition between working-class whites and black for jobs and housing gave rise to fears and tensions. In 1906, print media fueled these tensions with hearsay about alleged sexual assaults on white women by Black men, triggering the 1906 Atlanta race riot, which left at least 27 people dead (25 of them black) and over 70 injured. Many Black businesses were destroyed.

==== Rise of Sweet Auburn ====
Black businesses started to move from the previously integrated business district downtown to the relative safety of the area around the Atlanta University Center west of downtown, and to Auburn Avenue in the Fourth Ward east of downtown. "Sweet" Auburn Avenue became home to Alonzo Herndon's Atlanta Mutual, the city's first black-owned life insurance company, and to a celebrated concentration of black businesses, newspapers, churches, and nightclubs. In 1956, Fortune magazine called Sweet Auburn "the richest Negro street in the world", a phrase originally coined by civil-rights leader John Wesley Dobbs. Sweet Auburn and Atlanta's elite black colleges formed the nexus of a prosperous black middle class and upper class, which arose despite enormous social and legal obstacles.

=== Jim Crow laws ===
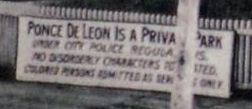
A sign at the entrance to Ponce de Leon amusement park in 1908 indicating "colored persons admitted as servants only"

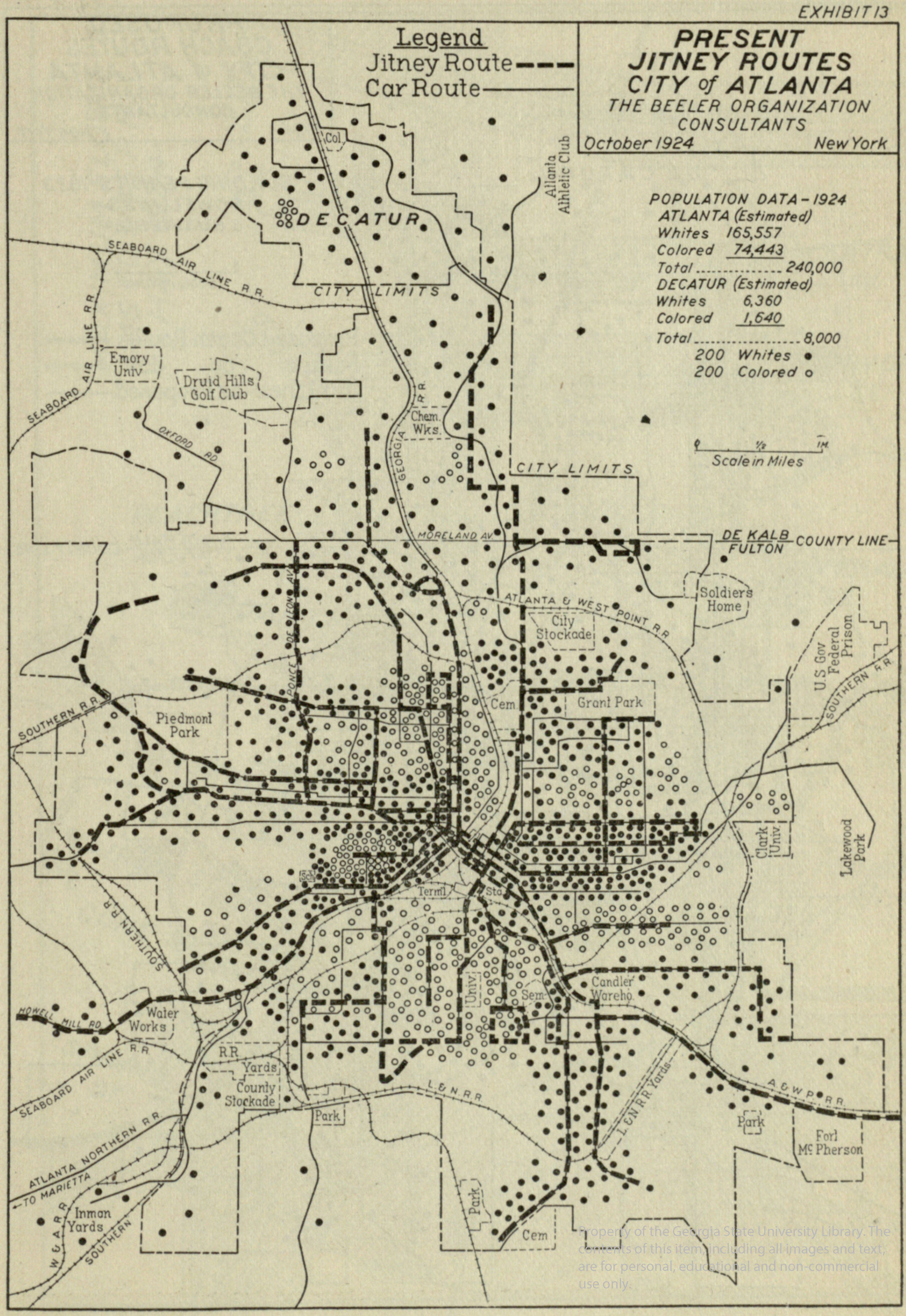
A 1924 map of jitney (share taxi) routes in Atlanta; the map, oriented with east at the top, shows the segregated housing patterns of the time

Jim Crow laws were passed in swift succession in the years after the riot. The result was in some cases segregated facilities, with nearly always inferior conditions for black customers. In many cases it resulted in no facilities at all available to black people, e.g. all parks were designated whites-only (although a private park, Joyland, opened in 1921). In 1910, the city council passed an ordinance requiring that restaurants be designated for one race only, hobbling black restaurant owners who had been attracting both black and white customers.

In the same year, Atlanta's streetcars were segregated, with black patrons required to sit in the rear. If not enough seats were available for all white riders, the black people sitting furthest forward in the trolley were required to stand and give their seats to whites. In 1913, the city created official boundaries for white and black residential areas. In 1920, the city prohibited black-owned salons from serving white women and children.

Beyond this, black people were subject to the South's "racial protocol", whereby, according to the New Georgia Encyclopedia:

[A]ll blacks were required to pay obeisance to all whites, even those whites of low social standing. And although they were required to address whites by the title "sir," blacks rarely received the same courtesy themselves. Because even minor breaches of racial etiquette often resulted in violent reprisals, the region's codes of deference transformed daily life into a theater of ritual, where every encounter, exchange, and gesture reinforced black inferiority.

In 1913, Leo Frank, a Jewish supervisor at a factory in Atlanta, was put on trial for raping and murdering a 13-year-old white employee from Marietta, a suburb of Atlanta. After doubts about Frank's guilt led his death sentence to be commuted in 1915, riots broke out in Atlanta among whites. They kidnapped Frank from the State Prison Farm in the city of Milledgeville, with the collusion of prison guards, and took him to Marietta, where he was lynched. Later that year, the Klan was reborn in Atlanta.

=== Country music scene ===
Many Appalachian people came to Atlanta to work in the cotton mills and brought their music with them. Starting with a 1913 fiddler's convention, Atlanta became the center of a thriving country-music scene. Atlanta was an important center for country music recording and talent recruiting in the 1920s and 1930s, and a live music center for an additional two decades after that.

=== Growth ===
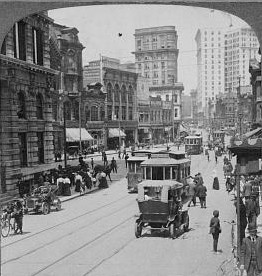
In 1907, Peachtree Street, the main street of Atlanta, was busy with streetcars and automobiles

In 1914, Asa Griggs Candler, the founder of The Coca-Cola Company and brother to former Emory President Warren Candler, persuaded the Methodist Episcopal Church South to build the new campus of Emory University in the emerging affluent suburb of Druid Hills, which borders northeastern Atlanta.

In 1916, Candler was elected mayor of Atlanta (taking office in 1917). As mayor he balanced the city budget and coordinated rebuilding efforts after the Great Atlanta fire of 1917 destroyed 1,500 homes. He also made large personal loans in order to develop the water and sewage facilities of the city of Atlanta, in order to provide the infrastructure necessary to a modern city.

Candler was also a philanthropist, endowing numerous schools and universities (he gave a total of $7 million to Emory University,) and the Candler Hospital in Savannah, Georgia. Candler had paid to relocate Emory University from Oxford, Georgia, to Atlanta.

=== Great Atlanta Fire of 1917 ===
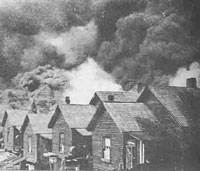
The Great Atlanta Fire in the Fourth Ward, 1917

On May 21, 1917, the Great Atlanta Fire destroyed 1,938 buildings, mostly wooden, in what is now the Old Fourth Ward. The fire resulted in 10,000 people becoming homeless. Only one person died, a woman who died of a heart attack when seeing her home in ashes.

In the 1930s, the Great Depression hit Atlanta. With the city government nearing bankruptcy, the Coca-Cola Company had to help bail out the city's deficit. The federal government stepped in to help Atlantans by establishing Techwood Homes, the nation's first federal housing project in 1935.

On the political scene, between March and May 1930, the police arrested six communist leaders, who became known as the Atlanta Six, under a restoration-era insurrection statute. These leaders were Morris H. Powers, Joseph Carr, Mary Dalton, Ann Burlak, Herbert Newton, and Henry Storey. During the summer of 1930, approximately 150 Atlanta business leaders, American Legion members, and members of law enforcement founded the American Fascisti Association and Order of the Black Shirts with the goal to "foster the principles of white supremacy".

In 1932, the city began to deny the Black Shirts permits for parades and charters. In 1932, Angelo Herndon was arrested and charged under the insurrection statute for being in possession of communist literature. Herndon's defense team, including attorney Benjamin J. Davis Jr., countered that by systemically excluding Black Americans from the jury pool, the criminal justice system was violating Herndon's civil rights, making the verdict invalid. The defense team appealed the decision to the Supreme Court twice and secured a decision against the insurrection statute in 1937.

=== Gone with the Wind premiere ===
On December 15, 1939, Atlanta hosted the premiere of Gone with the Wind, the movie based on Atlanta resident Margaret Mitchell's best-selling novel. Stars Clark Gable, Vivien Leigh, and Olivia de Havilland were in attendance. The premiere was held at Loew's Grand Theatre, at Peachtree and Forsyth Streets, current site of the Georgia-Pacific building. An enormous crowd, numbering 300,000 people according to the Atlanta Constitution, filled the streets on an ice-cold night in Atlanta. A rousing ovation greeted a group of Confederate veterans who were guests of honor.

==== Absence of film's black stars at event ====
Noticeably absent was Hattie McDaniel, who won the Academy Award for Best Supporting Actress for her role as Mammy, as well as Butterfly McQueen (Prissy). The black actors were barred from attending the premiere, from appearing in the souvenir program, and from all the film's advertising in the South. Director David Selznick had attempted to bring McDaniel to the premiere, but MGM advised him not to do so. Clark Gable angrily threatened to boycott the premiere, but McDaniel convinced him to attend, anyway. McDaniel did attend the Hollywood debut thirteen days later, and was featured prominently in the program.

==== Controversial participation of Martin Luther King Sr. ====
Martin Luther King Jr. sang at the gala as part of a children's choir of his father's church, Ebenezer Baptist. The boys dressed as pickaninnies and the girls wore "Aunt Jemima"-style bandanas, the dress seen by many black people as humiliating. John Wesley Dobbs tried to dissuade Rev. Martin Luther King Sr., from participating at the whites-only event, and Rev. King was harshly criticized in the black community.

=== Transportation hub ===
In 1941, Delta Air Lines moved its headquarters to Atlanta. Delta became the world's largest airline in 2008 after acquiring Northwest Airlines.

=== World War II ===
With the entry of the United States into World War II, soldiers from around the Southeastern United States went through Atlanta to train and later be discharged at Fort McPherson. War-related manufacturing such as the Bell Aircraft factory in the suburb of Marietta helped boost the city's population and economy. Shortly after the war in 1946, the Communicable Disease Center, later called the Centers for Disease Control and Prevention was founded in Atlanta from the old Malaria Control in War Areas offices and staff.

Atlanta played a vital role in the Allied effort during World War II. Colonel Blake Van Leer the president of Georgia Tech played a significant part by lobbying war-related manufacturing companies like Lockheed Martin to move to Atlanta, successfully lobbying the Government to build military bases, in turn helping attract thousands of new residents through new jobs. Van Leer also launched major research centers, which included Neely Nuclear Research Center and funds to help make Georgia Tech the "MIT" of the south while also founding Southern Polytechnic State University.

== Suburbanization and Civil Rights: 1946–1989 ==
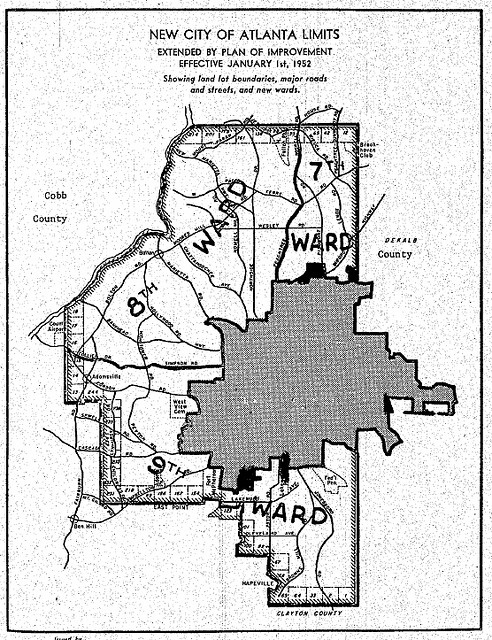
1952 annexation

In 1951, the city received the All-America City Award due to its rapid growth and high standard of living in the southern U.S.

Annexation was the central strategy for growth. In 1952, Atlanta annexed Buckhead as well as vast areas of what are now northwest, southwest, and south Atlanta, adding 82 square miles (210 km^{2}) and tripling its area. By doing so, 100,000 new affluent white residents were added, preserving white political power, expanding the city's property tax base, and enlarging the traditional white upper middle class leadership. This class now had room to expand inside the city limits.

Federal court decisions in 1962 and 1963 ended the county-unit system, thus greatly reducing rural Georgia control over the state legislature, enabling Atlanta and other cities to gain proportional political power. The federal courts opened the Democratic Party primary to black voters, who surged in numbers and became increasingly well organized through the Atlanta Negro Voters League.

=== Blockbusting and racial transition in neighborhoods ===
In the late 1950s, after forced-housing patterns were outlawed, violence, intimidation, and organized political pressure were used in some white neighborhoods to discourage black people from buying homes there. However, by the late 1950s, such efforts proved futile as blockbusting drove whites to sell their homes in neighborhoods such as Adamsville, Center Hill, Grove Park in northwest Atlanta, and white sections of Edgewood and Kirkwood on the east side. In 1961, the city attempted to thwart blockbusting by erecting road barriers in Cascade Heights, countering the efforts of civic and business leaders to foster Atlanta as the "city too busy to hate".

Efforts to stop transition in Cascade failed too. Neighborhoods of new black homeowners took root, helping alleviate the enormous strain of the lack of housing available to African Americans. Atlanta's western and southern neighborhoods transitioned to majority black — between 1960 and 1970 the number of census tracts that were at least 90% black, tripled. East Lake, Kirkwood, Watts Road, Reynoldstown, Almond Park, Mozley Park, Center Hill, and Cascade Heights underwent an almost total transition from white to black. The black proportion of the city's population rose from 38 to 51%. Meanwhile, during the same decade, the city lost 60,000 white residents, a 20% decline.

White flight and the building of malls in the suburbs triggered a slow decline of the central business district. Meanwhile, conservatism grew rapidly in the suburbs, and white Georgians were increasingly willing to vote for Republicans, most notably Newt Gingrich.

=== Civil Rights Movement ===
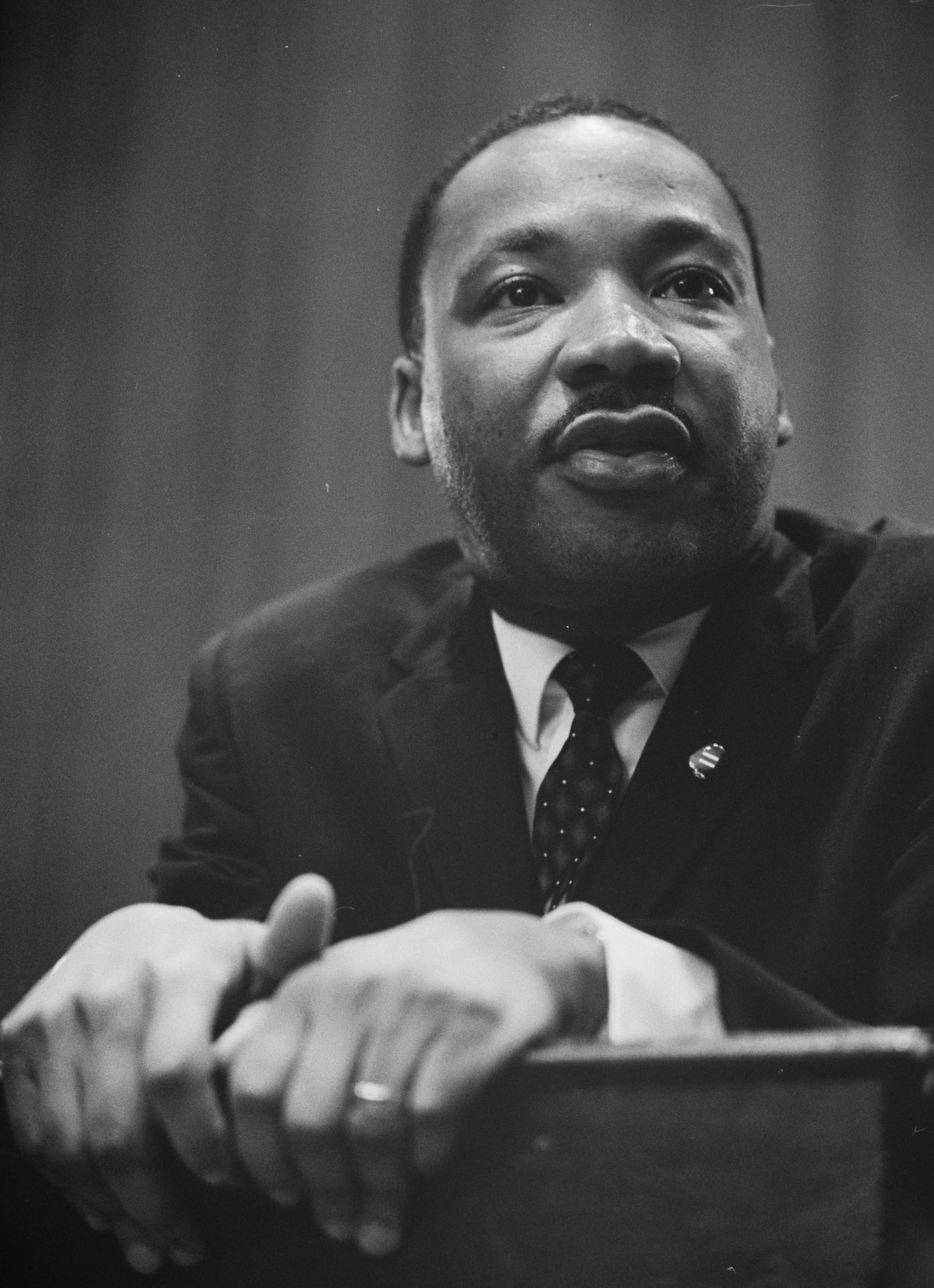
Martin Luther King Jr.

In the wake of the landmark U.S. Supreme Court decision Brown v. Board of Education, which helped usher in the Civil Rights Movement, racial tensions in Atlanta erupted in acts of violence. One such instance occurred on October 12, 1958, when a Reform Jewish temple on Peachtree Street was bombed. A group of white supremacists calling themselves the "Confederate Underground" claimed responsibility. The temple's leader, Rabbi Jacob M. Rothschild, actively spoke out in support of the burgeoning Civil Rights Movement and against segregation, which is likely why the congregation was targeted.

In January 1956, Bobby Grier became the first black player to participate in the Sugar Bowl. He is also regarded as the first black player to compete at a bowl game in the Deep South, though others such as Wallace Triplett had played in games like the 1948 Cotton Bowl in Dallas. Grier's team, the Pittsburgh Panthers, was set to play against the Georgia Tech Yellow Jackets. However, Georgia's Governor Marvin Griffin beseeched Georgia Tech's president Blake Van Leer and its players to not participate in this racially integrated game. Griffin was widely criticized by news media leading up to the game, and protests were held by Georgia Tech, locals and University of Georgia students. The protests quickly turned into a riot. The students broke windows, upturned parking meters, hung Griffin in effigy, and marched all the way to the governor's mansion, surrounding it until 3:30 a.m. Griffin publicly blamed Georgia Tech's President for the "riots" and requested he be replaced and Georgia Tech's state funding be cut off. After delivering a commencement speech at the all-Black Morris Brown College, Van Leer was summoned by the board of regents where he was quoted

Either we're going to the Sugar Bowl or you can find yourself another damn president of Georgia Tech.

. Despite the governor's objections, Georgia Tech upheld the contract and proceeded to compete in the bowl. In the game's first quarter, a pass interference call against Grier ultimately resulted in Yellow Jackets' 7-0 victory. After the game, Grier was invited by Georgia Tech's president and players to dinner at the segregated St. Charles Hotel. Grier stated that he has mostly positive memories about the experience, including the support from teammates and letters from all over the world. President Van Leer would die two weeks later, his family publicly stated it was from the stress of this event and death threats.

In the 1960s, Atlanta was a major organizing center of the Civil Rights Movement, with Martin Luther King Jr., and students from Atlanta's historically black colleges and universities playing major roles in the movement's leadership. On October 19, 1960, a sit-in at the lunch counters of several Atlanta department stores led to the arrest of Dr. King and several students. This drew attention from the national media and from presidential candidate John F. Kennedy.

Despite this incident, Atlanta's political and business leaders fostered Atlanta's image as "the city too busy to hate". While the city mostly avoided confrontation, minor race riots did occur in 1965 and 1968.

=== Desegregation ===
Desegregation of the public sphere came in stages, with buses and trolleybuses desegregated in 1959, restaurants at Rich's department store in 1961, (though Lester Maddox's Pickrick restaurant famously remained segregated through 1964), and movie theaters in 1962–3. While in 1961, Mayor Ivan Allen Jr. became one of the few Southern white mayors to support desegregation of his city's public schools, initial compliance was token, and in reality desegregation occurred in stages from 1961 to 1973.

=== 1962 air crash and influence on art scene ===
In 1962, Atlanta in general and its arts community in particular were shaken by the deaths of 106 people on Air France charter flight 007, which crashed. The Atlanta Art Association had sponsored a month-long tour of the art treasures of Europe. 106 of the tour members were heading home to Atlanta on the flight. The group included many of Atlanta's cultural and civic leaders. Atlanta mayor Ivan Allen Jr. went to Orly, France, to inspect the crash site where so many important Atlantans perished. The loss was a catalyst for the arts in Atlanta and helped create the Woodruff Arts Center, originally called the Memorial Arts Center, as a tribute to the victims, and led to the creation of the Atlanta Arts Alliance. The French government donated a Rodin sculpture, The Shade, to the High in memory of the victims of the crash.

The crash occurred during the Civil Rights Movement and affected it, as well. Martin Luther King Jr., and Harry Belafonte announced cancellation of a sit-in in downtown Atlanta as a conciliatory gesture to the grieving city, while Nation of Islam leader Malcolm X gained widespread national attention for the first time by expressing joy over the deaths of the all-white group.

=== Freeway construction and revolts ===
Atlanta's freeway system was completed in the 1950s and 1960s, with the Perimeter completed in 1969. Historic neighborhoods such as Washington-Rawson and Copenhill were damaged or destroyed in the process. Additional proposed freeways were never built due to the protests of city residents. The opposition lasted three decades, with then-governor Jimmy Carter playing a key role in stopping I-485 through Morningside and Virginia Highland to Inman Park in 1973, but pushing hard in the 1980s for a "Presidential Parkway" between downtown, the new Carter Center, and Druid Hills/Emory.

=== Urban renewal ===
In the 1960s, slums such as Buttermilk Bottom near today's Civic Center were razed, in principle to build better housing, but much of the land remained empty until the 1980s, when mixed-income communities were built in what was renamed Bedford Pine. The African-American community east of downtown suffered as the center of the black economy moved squarely to southwestern Atlanta. During the 1960s, African-American citizens'-rights groups such as U-Rescue emerged to address the lack of housing for poor black people.

=== Shoppers move to new malls as Downtown gains new roles ===
The first major mall built in Atlanta was Lenox Square in Buckhead, opening in August 1959. From 1964 until 1973, nine major malls opened, most at the Perimeter freeway: Cobb Center in 1963, Columbia Mall in 1964, North DeKalb and Greenbriar malls in 1965, South DeKalb Mall in 1968, Phipps Plaza (near Lenox Square) in 1969, Perimeter and Northlake malls in 1971, and Cumberland Mall in 1973. Downtown Atlanta became less and less a shopping destination for the area's shoppers. Rich's closed its flagship store downtown in 1991, leaving government offices the major presence in the South Downtown area around it.

On the north side of Five Points, Downtown continued as the largest concentration of office space in Metro Atlanta, though it began to compete with Midtown, Buckhead, and the suburbs. The first four towers of Peachtree Center were built in 1965–1967, including the Hyatt Regency Atlanta, designed by John Portman, with its 22-story atrium. In total, 17 buildings of more than 15n floors were built in the 1960s. The center of gravity of Downtown Atlanta correspondingly moved north from the Five Points area towards Peachtree Center.

Atlanta's convention and hotel facilities also grew immensely. John C. Portman Jr. designed and opened what is now the AmericasMart merchandise mart in 1958; the Sheraton Atlanta, the city's first convention hotel, was built in the 1960s; the Atlanta Hilton opened in 1971; as did two Portman-designed hotels: the Peachtree Plaza Hotel now owned by Westin in 1976, and the Marriott in 1985. The Omni Coliseum opened in 1976, as did the Georgia World Congress Center (GWCC). The GWCC expanded multiple times in succeeding decades and helped make Atlanta one of the country's top convention cities.

=== Black political power and Mayor Jackson ===
In 1960, whites comprised 61.7% of the city's population. African Americans became a majority in the city by 1970, and exercised new-found political influence by electing Atlanta's first black mayor, Maynard Jackson, in 1973. In 1974, the Board of Aldermen was officially overhauled into the Atlanta City Council.

During Jackson's first term as mayor, much progress was made in improving race relations in and around Atlanta, and Atlanta acquired the motto "A City Too Busy to Hate". As mayor, he led the beginnings and much of the progress on several huge public-works projects in Atlanta and its region. He helped arrange for the rebuilding of the airport's huge terminal to modern standards, and this airport was renamed the Hartsfield-Jackson Atlanta International Airport in his honor shortly after his death, also named after him is the new Maynard Holbrook Jackson Jr. International Terminal which opened in May 2012. He also fought against the construction of freeways through intown neighborhoods.

=== Construction of MARTA rail system ===
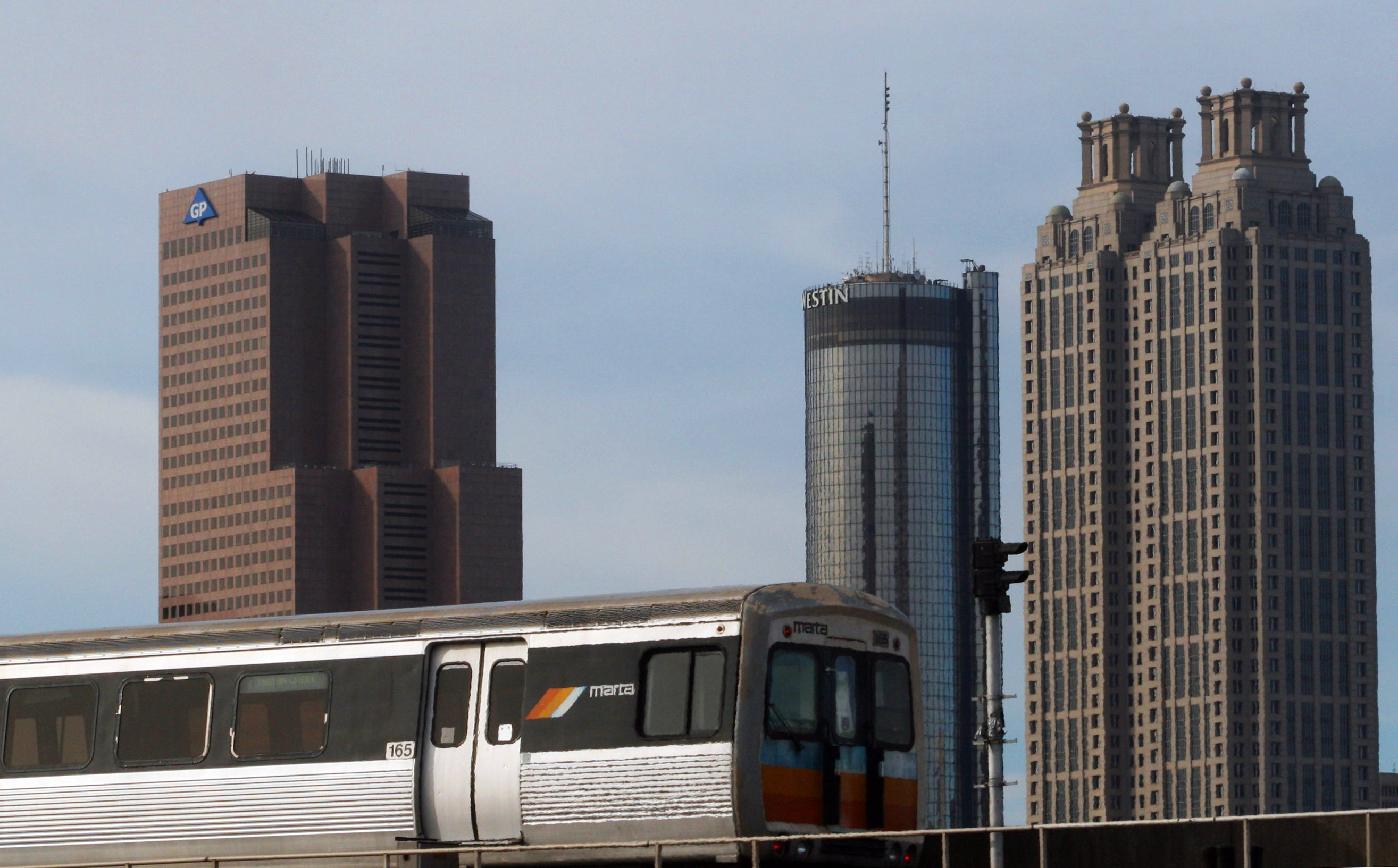
The MARTA train with Downtown Atlanta in background

In 1965, an act of the Georgia General Assembly created the Metropolitan Atlanta Rapid Transit Authority, or MARTA, which was to provide rapid transit for the five largest metropolitan counties: DeKalb, Fulton, Clayton, Gwinnett, and Cobb, but a referendum authorizing participation in the system failed in Cobb County. A 1968 referendum to fund MARTA failed, but in 1971, Fulton and DeKalb Counties passed a 1% sales tax increase to pay for operations, while Clayton and Gwinnett counties overwhelmingly rejected the tax in referendum, fearing the introduction of crime and "undesirable elements". In 1972, the agency bought the existing, bus-only Atlanta Transit Company.

Construction began on the new rail system in 1975. Service started in June 1979, running east–west from Georgia State University downtown to Avondale. The Five Points downtown hub opened later that year. A short north–south line opened in 1981, which by 1984 had been extended to reach from Brookhaven to Lakewood/Fort McPherson. In 1988, the line was extended to a station inside the airport terminal. A line originally envisioned to run to Emory University is still under consideration.

=== Child murders ===
Atlanta was rocked by a series of murders of children from the summer of 1979 until the spring of 1981. Over the two-year period, at least 22 children, and 6 adults were killed, all of them black. Atlanta native Wayne Williams, also black and 23 years old at the time of the last murder, was convicted of two of the murders and sent to prison for life. The rest of the crimes remain unsolved today.

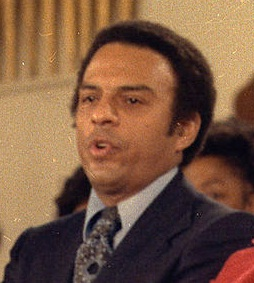
Mayor Andrew Young

=== Mayor Andrew Young ===
In 1981, after being urged by a number of people, including Coretta Scott King, the widow of Martin Luther King Jr., Democratic Congressman Andrew Young ran for mayor of Atlanta. He was elected later that year with 55% of the vote, succeeding Maynard Jackson. As mayor of Atlanta, he brought in $70 billion of new private investment. He continued and expanded Maynard Jackson's programs for including minority and female-owned businesses in all city contracts.

The Mayor's Task Force on Education established the Dream Jamboree College Fair that tripled the college scholarships given to Atlanta public school graduates. In 1985, he was involved in privatizing the Atlanta Zoo, which was renamed Zoo Atlanta. The then-moribund zoo was overhauled, making ecological habitats specific to different animals.

Young was re-elected as Mayor in 1985 with more than 80% of the vote. Atlanta hosted the 1988 Democratic National Convention during Young's tenure. He was prohibited by term limits from running for a third term. He was succeeded by Maynard Jackson who returned as mayor from 1990 to 1994. Bill Campbell succeeded Jackson as mayor in 1994 and served through 2002.

=== Campbell mayorship and failure of Atlanta Empowerment Zone ===
In November 1994, the Atlanta Empowerment Zone was established, a 10-year, $250 million federal program to revitalize Atlanta's 34 poorest neighborhoods including The Bluff. Scathing reports from both the U.S. Department of Housing and Urban Development and the Georgia Department of Community Affairs revealed corruption, waste, bureaucratic incompetence, and specifically called out interference by mayor Bill Campbell.

In 1993-1996 about 250,000 people attended Freaknik, an annual Spring Break gathering for African Americans which was not centrally organized and which resulted in much traffic gridlock and increased crime. After a 1996 crackdown annual attendance dissipated and the event moved to other cities.

== Olympic and World City: 1990–present ==
=== 1996 Summer Olympics ===
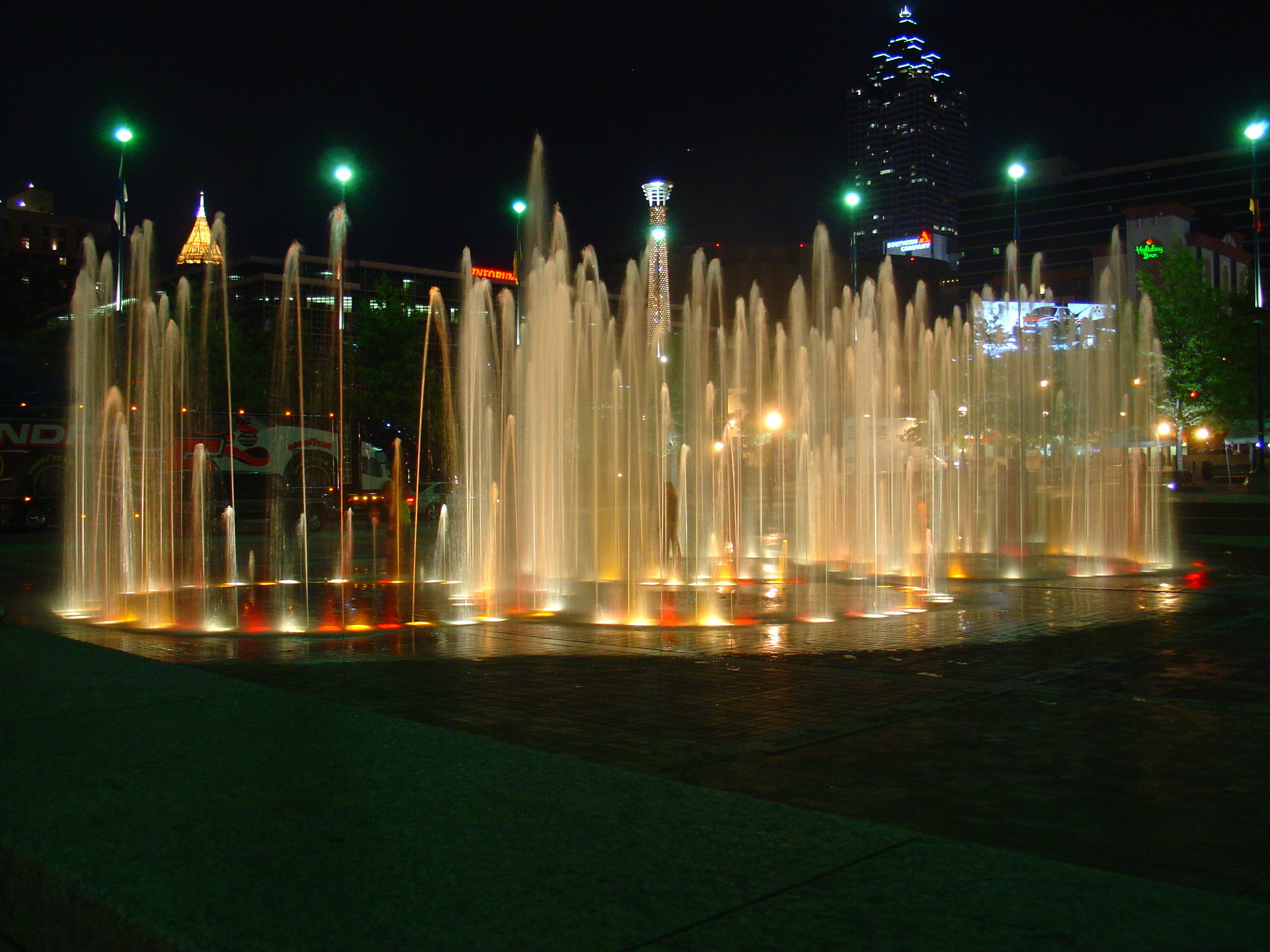
Fountain of Rings at Centennial Olympic Park. The park commemorates the 1996 Summer Olympics

In 1990, the International Olympic Committee selected Atlanta as the site for the 1996 Summer Olympics. Following the announcement, Atlanta undertook several major construction projects to improve the city's parks, sports facilities, and transportation, including the completion of long-contested Freedom Parkway. Former Mayor Bill Campbell allowed many "tent cities" to be built, creating a carnival atmosphere around the games. Atlanta became the third American city to host the Summer Olympics, after St. Louis (1904 Summer Olympics) and Los Angeles (1932, 1984, and 2028).

The games themselves were notable in the realm of sporting events, but they were marred by numerous organizational inefficiencies. A dramatic event was the Centennial Olympic Park bombing, in which two people died, one from a heart attack, and several others were injured. Eric Robert Rudolph was later convicted of the bombing as an anti-government and pro-life protest.

=== Shirley Franklin mayorship ===
Shirley Franklin's 2001 run for mayor was her first run for public office. She won, succeeding Mayor Bill Campbell after winning 50 percent of the vote. Facing a massive and unexpected budget deficit, Franklin slashed the number of government employees and increased taxes to balance the budget as quickly as possible.

Franklin made repairing the Atlanta sewer system a main focus of her office. Prior to Franklin's term, Atlanta's combined sewer system violated the federal Clean Water Act and burdened the city government with fines from the Environmental Protection Agency. In 2002, Franklin announced an initiative called "Clean Water Atlanta" to address the problem and begin improving the city's sewer system.

She has been lauded for efforts to make the City of Atlanta "green". Under Franklin's leadership Atlanta has gone from having one of the lowest percentages of LEED certified buildings to one of the highest.

In 2005, Time magazine named Franklin of the five best big-city American mayors. In October of that same year, she was included in the U.S. News & World Report "Best Leaders of 2005" issue. With solid popular support and strong backing from the business sector, Franklin was reelected mayor in 2005, garnering more than 90 percent of the vote.

=== 2008 tornado ===
On March 14, 2008, a tornado ripped through downtown Atlanta, the first since weather has been recorded in 1880. There was minor damage to many downtown skyscrapers. However, two holes were torn into the roof of the Georgia Dome, tearing down catwalks and the scoreboard as debris rained onto the court in the middle of an SEC game. The Omni Hotel suffered major damage, along with Centennial Olympic Park and the Georgia World Congress Center. Fulton Bag and Cotton Mills and Oakland Cemetery were also damaged.

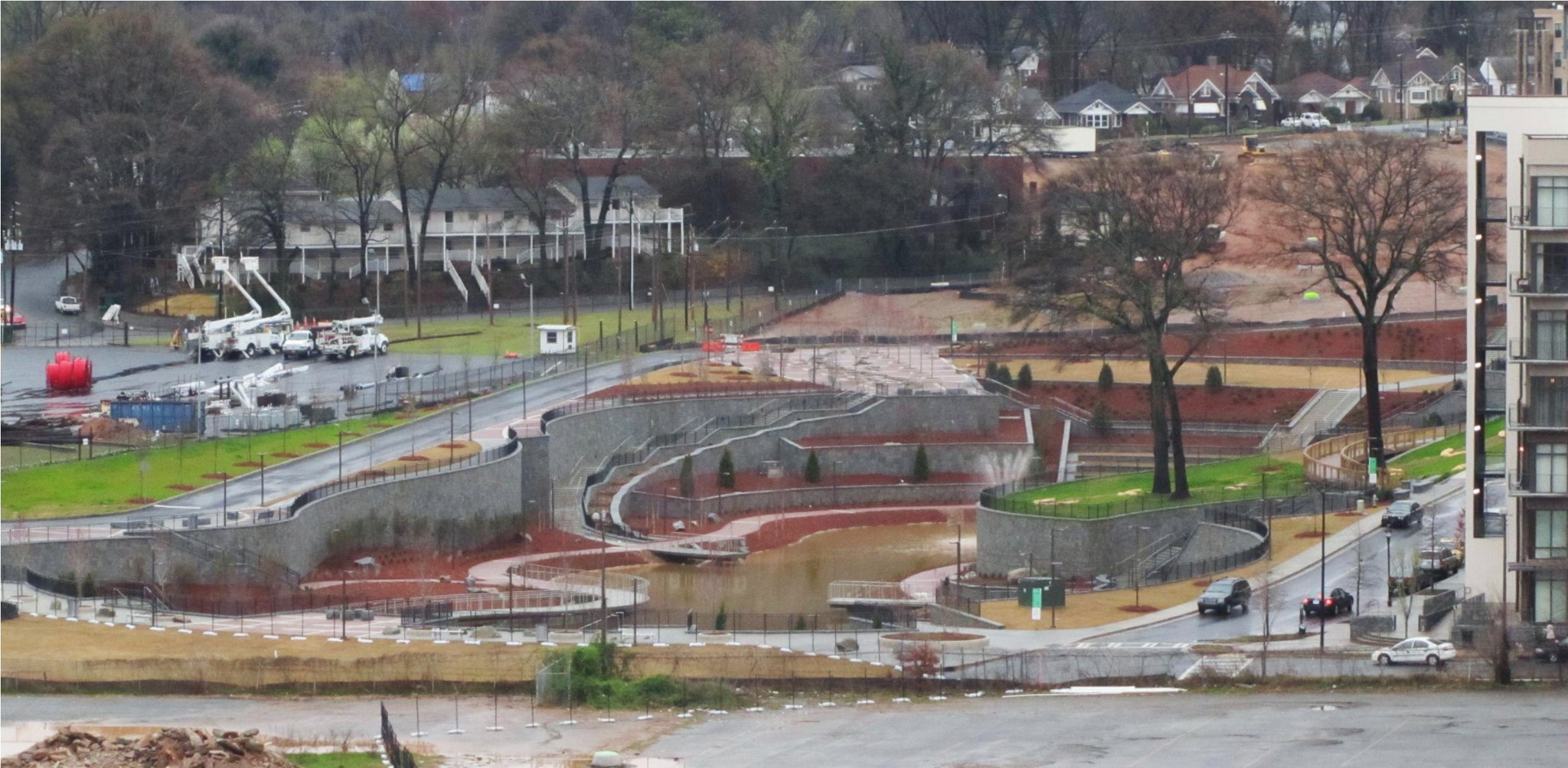
Historic Fourth Ward Park, a new park created as part of the Beltline project

=== Beltline ===
In 2005, the $2.8 billion Beltline project was adopted, with the stated goals of converting a disused 22-mile freight railroad loop that surrounds the central city into an art-filled multi-use trail and increasing the city's park space by 40%.

=== Gentrification ===
Since 2000, Atlanta has undergone a profound transformation culturally, demographically, and physically. Much of the city's change during the decade was driven by young, college-educated professionals: from 2000 to 2009, the three-mile radius surrounding Downtown Atlanta gained 9,722 residents aged 25 to 34 holding at least a four-year degree, an increase of 61%. Meanwhile, as gentrification spread throughout the city, Atlanta's cultural offerings expanded: the High Museum of Art doubled in size; the Alliance Theatre won a Tony Award; and numerous art galleries were established on the once-industrial Westside.

=== Racial transition ===
The black population in the Atlanta area rapidly suburbanized in the 1990s and 2000s. From 2000 to 2010, the city of Atlanta's black population shrunk by 31,678 people, dropping from 61.4% to 54.0% of the population. While black people exited the city and DeKalb County, the black population increased sharply in other areas of Metro Atlanta by 93.1%. During the same period, the proportion of whites in the city's population grew dramatically - faster than that of any other major U.S. city between 2000 and 2006.

Between 2000 and 2010, Atlanta added 22,763 whites, and the white proportion of the population increased from 31% to 38%. In 2009, a white mayoral candidate, Mary Norwood, lost by just 714 votes, out of over 84,000 cast, to Kasim Reed. This represented a historic change from the perception until that time that Atlanta was "guaranteed" to elect a black mayor. Other areas, like Marietta and Alpharetta, are seeing similar demographic changes, with huge increases of middle and upper income black people and Asian people—mostly former residents of Atlanta.

=== Recent events ===
In 2009, the Atlanta Public Schools cheating scandal began, which ABC News called the "worst in the country", resulting in the 2013 indictment of superintendent Beverly Hall.

In Late April of 2011, the 2011 Super Outbreak occurred, affecting the city.

Starting in October 2011, Occupy Atlanta staged demonstrations against banks and AT&T to protest alleged greed by those companies.

In September 2017, Hurricane Irma hit Atlanta as a tropical storm.

Significantly, in March 2020, Atlanta went to the national lockdown and social economic problems, where the city was impacted by COVID-19 pandemic. Following the approval of the first COVID-19 vaccines in Georgia, free and voluntary vaccination against the disease began in the city on December 14, 2020. However, many COVID-19 restrictions in the city were lifted up by June 2021.

In late May 2020 following George Floyd's murder, protests that developed into riots and looting occurred across Atlanta; mainly in the Downtown and Buckhead neighborhoods. Notable buildings and museums such as The CNN Center and The College Football Hall of Fame were vandalized.

In 2021, a series of mass shootings struck massage parlors in Atlanta and the surrounding area. Eight people were killed and a ninth person was wounded. A suspect was arrested on the same day as the incidents in Crisp County, south of Atlanta.

In 2021, a police training center that critics have called Cop City became controversial. The controversy attracted international attention after a protestor, Manuel Esteban Paez Teran was killed by police in January 2023.

In 2024, the outskirts of Hurricane Helene affected the city with heavy rain and flooding.

== See also ==
- African Americans in Atlanta
- Atlanta
- 1956 Sugar Bowl
- History of Georgia Tech
- Historic bridges of the Atlanta area
- Historic ferries of the Atlanta area
- Historic mills of the Atlanta area
- Hotels in Atlanta
