= State Bar of Georgia Building =

Building in Atlanta, Georgia, United States

Coordinates: 33.7562°N 84.3925°W

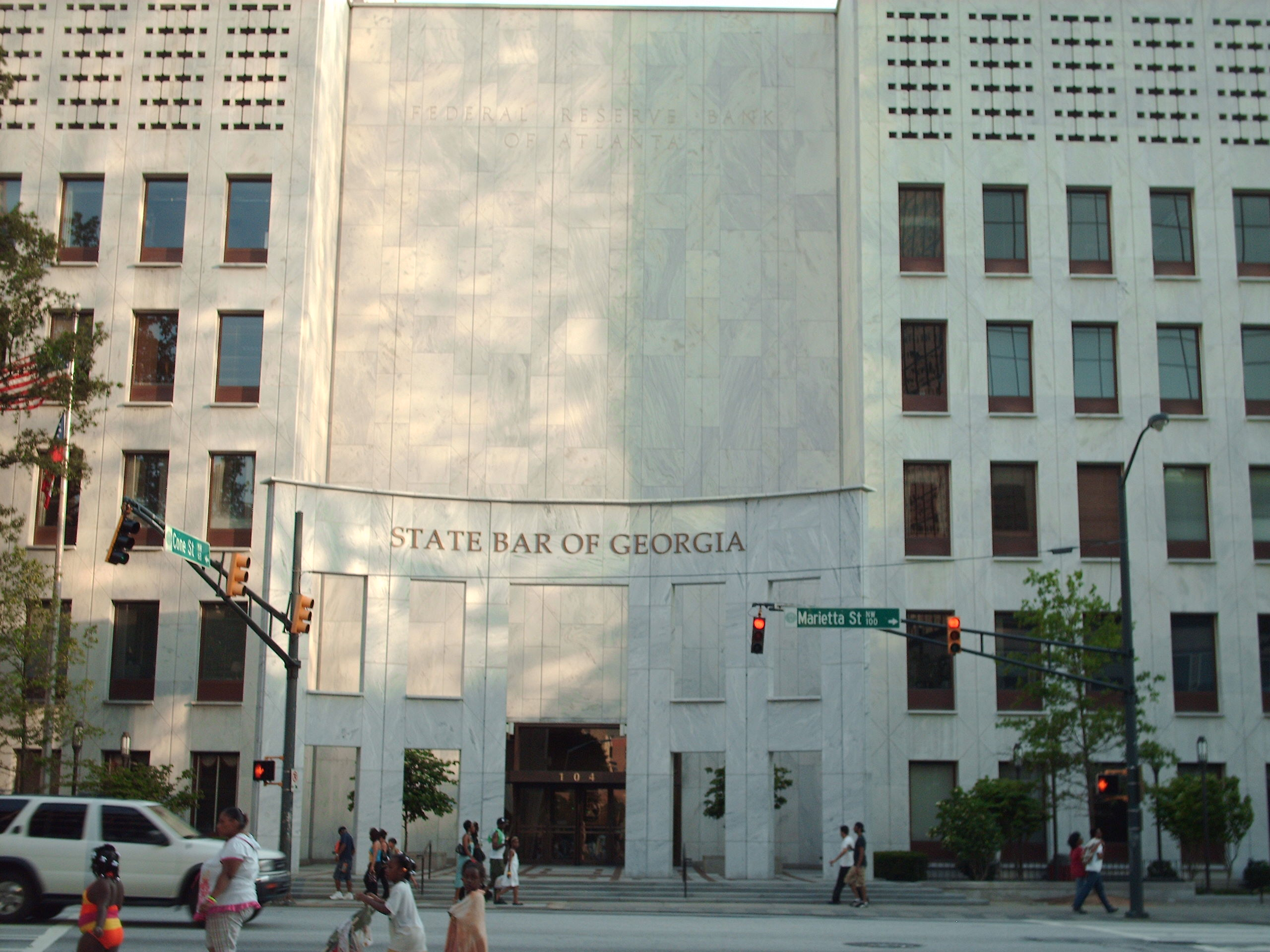
State Bar of Georgia Building ca. 2008

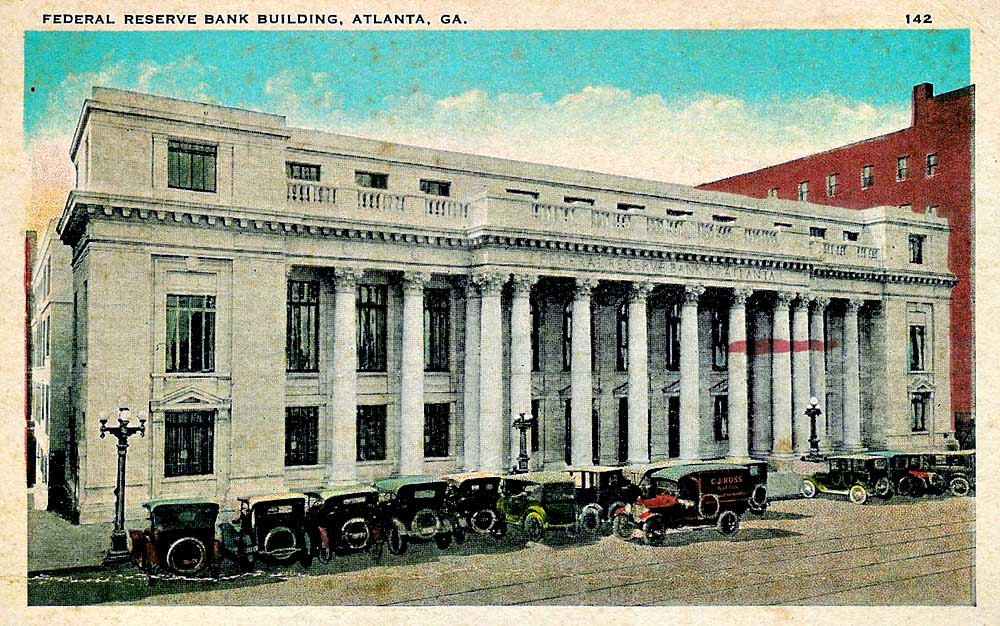
Federal Reserve Bank of Atlanta after expansion in 1920 and possibly after additional expansion in 1922

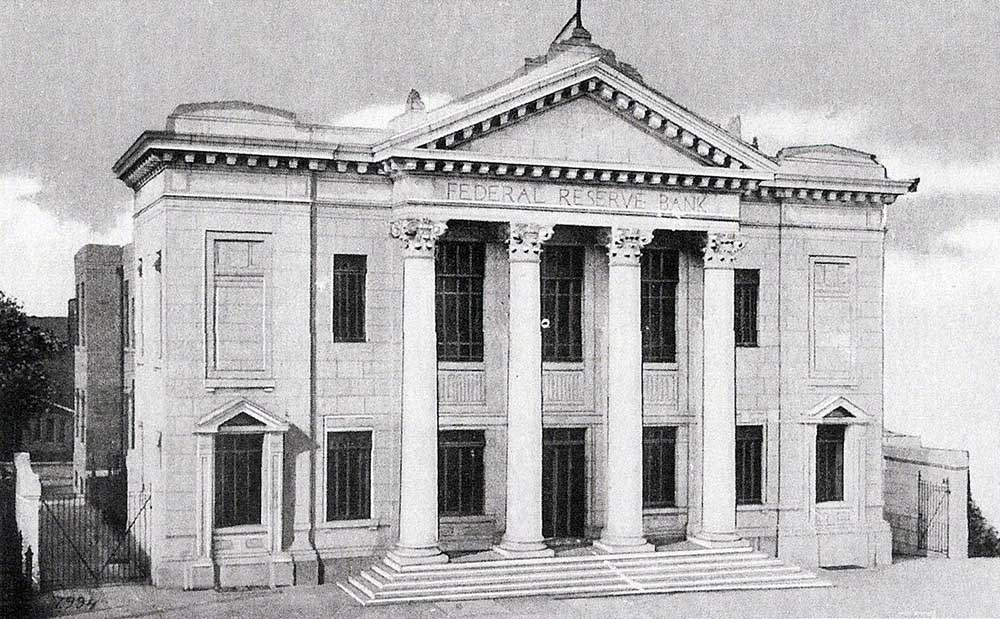
Federal Reserve Bank of Atlanta, original 1918 building

The State Bar of Georgia Building is located at 104 Marietta St. NW in Downtown Atlanta. The building opened in 1918, and was designed by A. Ten Eyck Brown, one of the most notable architects of public buildings in Atlanta in the first third of the 20th century. It was originally occupied by the Federal Reserve Bank of Atlanta before the bank moved to Midtown Atlanta in 2001 and is now occupied by the State Bar of Georgia.

A marker in front of the building identifies the location of the original site of the zero milepost of the terminus of the Western and Atlantic Railroad, and of the first settlement of Atlanta (then named Thrasherville).

Prior to the construction of the Federal Reserve building, the First Presbyterian Church of Atlanta occupied the site. The first church on the site was built in 1852, replaced by a more ornate structure in 1878, which was demolished in 1916. The church moved to Peachtree at 16th in Midtown Atlanta.
