= Veterans Park Amphitheatre =

- Interactive map of Veterans Park Amphitheatre
- Address: Corner of Oglethorpe Blvd and Front Street; Albany, Georgia
- Coordinates: 31.5745°N 84.14858°W
- Owner: Albany Parks & Recreation; Albany, Georgia
- Capacity: 2,500
- Type: Amphitheater

Veterans Park Amphitheatre is a 2,500-seat amphitheatre located in Albany, Georgia. It is part of a sports, entertainment and convention complex that also includes the Albany Civic Center and Albany Municipal Auditorium. From its opening in the mid 1980s into the mid 1990s, the amphitheatre was an anchor for two major annual events in Albany; River Days in the spring and Fall on the Flint. It is now primarily used for concerts and Memorial Day, Independence Day and Veterans Day celebrations.

== Vietnam War Memorial ==
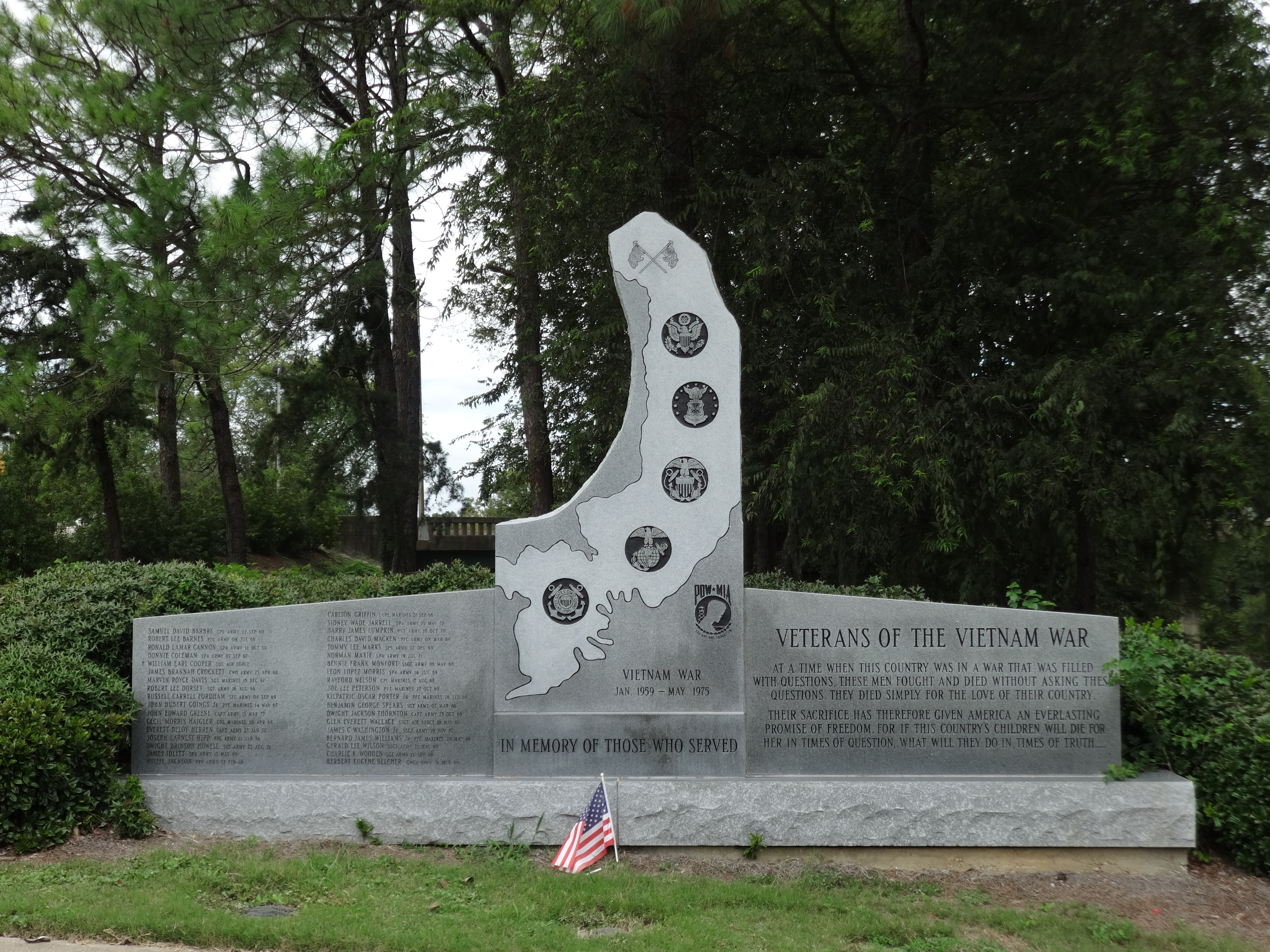
Veterans of the Vietnam War Memorial located at the entrance of Veterans Park

In 1989, The Veterans of the Vietnam War Memorial was built and placed at the entrance of Veterans Park. John Griffin, a Vietnam veteran and Purple Heart recipient, came up with the idea for the structure and constructed the design. The monument was carved from a 24,000-pound block of Georgia granite and lists the 42 soldiers from Dougherty and Lee County who died in that conflict. John Griffin says everything from the drafting and designs, to the materials, and all the labor was done by Georgia veterans who served in the Vietnam War.

== World War II Memorial ==
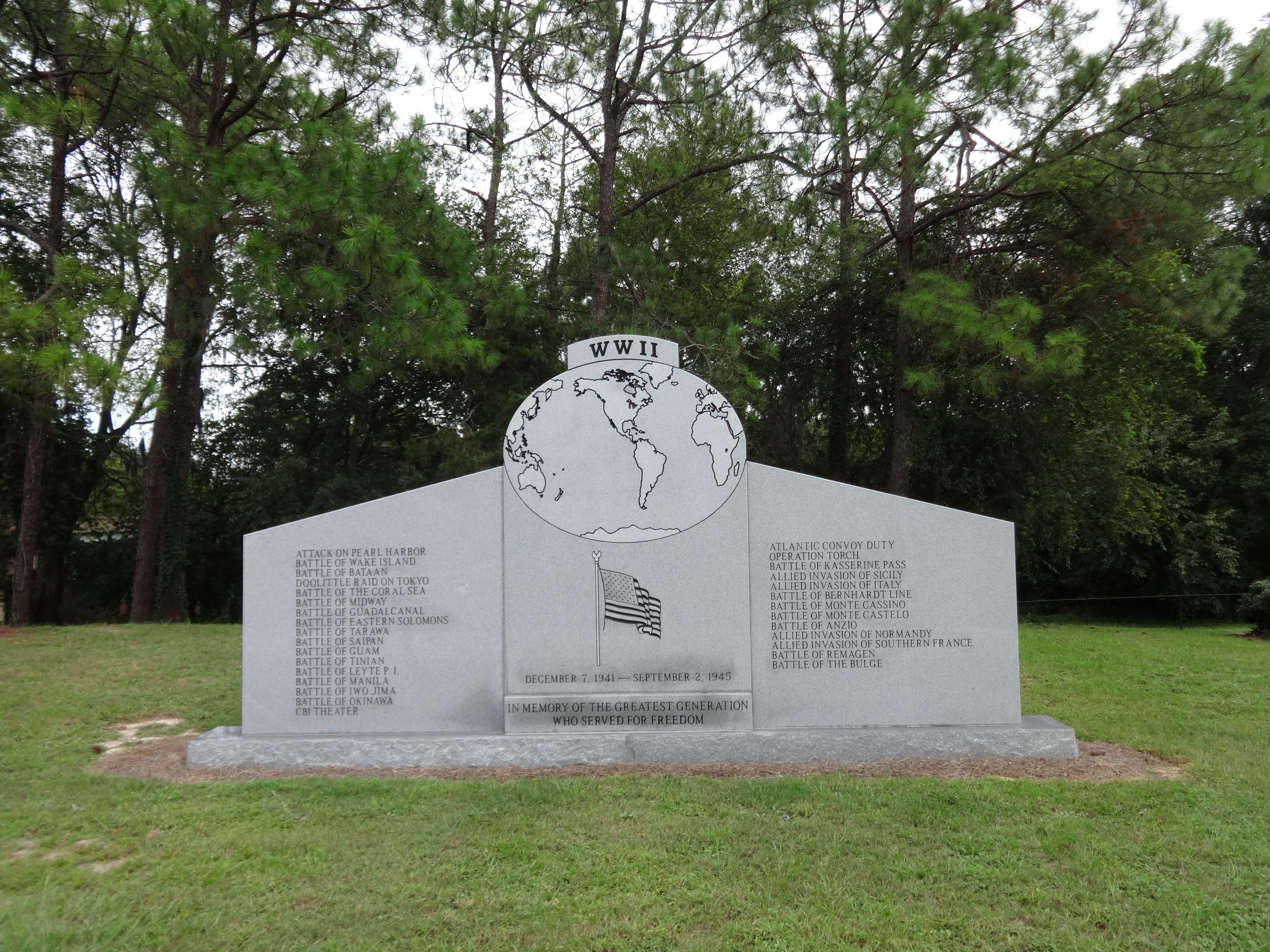
World War II Memorial located inside Veterans Park

On November 11, 2013, a large Veterans Day crowd overflowed Veterans Park Amphitheatre for the unveiling of The World War II Memorial. The Albany American Legion Post 30 and the SOWEGA Veterans Coalition worked over two years on the project and decided not to put names on the memorial because they were afraid they would forget someone, so instead they listed all the significant battles of the war. Charles Nicholson, Post 30 Financial Officer & Project Officer, said the $19,000 massive granite monument (19 feet long, 11 feet tall and weighing 11 tons) was paid for with donations. "America has celebrated Veterans Day since 1919," Albany Mayor Dorothy Hubbard said during the dedication ceremony. "But we are here to celebrate the men and women who served, fought and died for our freedoms in World War II. This monument will stand as a reminder to the people of Southwest Georgia that the sacrifices of the men and women who served will not be forgotten."
