= Martin Luther King Jr. Federal Building =

- Interactive map of the Martin Luther King Jr. Federal Building area
- Alternative names: United States Post Office, Federal Annex

General information
- Type: Government offices
- Location: 77 Forsyth Street SW; Atlanta, Georgia
- Coordinates: 33.7532°N 84.3961°W
- Completed: 1933
- Cost: $3,000,000
- Owner: General Services Administration
- Management: General Services Administration

Height
- Roof: 116.74 m (383.0 ft)

Technical details
- Floor count: 10
- Floor area: 291,025 sq ft (27,037.1 m^{2})

Design and construction
- Architect: A. Ten Eyck Brown
- Developer: General Services Administration

The Martin Luther King Jr. Federal Building (shorter form King Federal Building) is a building in Atlanta, Georgia. It was completed in 1933 in classical style for the United States Postal Service, and is now used as office accommodation by the United States Federal Government. It is included in the National Register of Historic Places.

The building was constructed by the Work Projects Administration, a New Deal agency, reflecting the expansion of Federal activity at that time. It was located adjacent to Terminal Station in Spring Street, and mail was transferred via tunnels from the railroad network, which then handled most long-distance mail. Later the building became a Federal office building, receiving its present name in 1988. The General Services Administration (GSA) undertook renovation in 2012, as far as possible in line with current "green building" criteria.

The building served Police Squad headquarters in the 2025 film The Naked Gun.
