= Albany Municipal Auditorium =

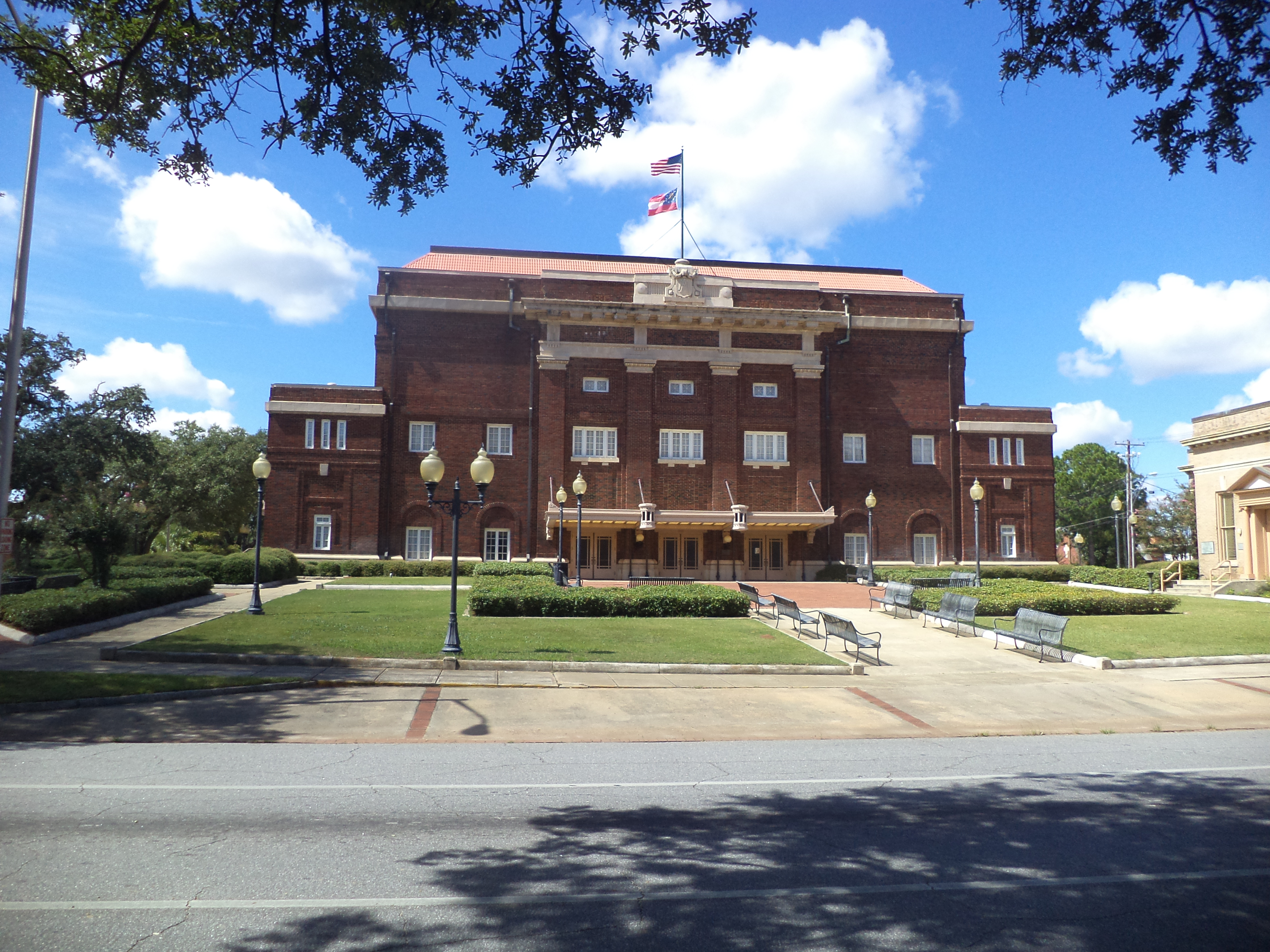
- Interactive map of Albany Municipal Auditorium
- Full name: Albany Municipal Auditorium
- Address: 301 Pine Avenue, Albany, Georgia
- Coordinates: 31°34′44″N 84°09′15″W
- Owner: City of Albany, Georgia
- Capacity: 965
- Type: Auditorium

Construction
- Built: 1915
- Renovated: 1986

Website
- http://www.albanymunicipalauditorium.org/

- Municipal Auditorium
- U.S. National Register of Historic Places
- Location within Georgia Location within the United States
- Location: 301 Pine Avenue, Albany, Georgia
- Built: 1915
- Architect: A. Ten Eyck Brown
- Architectural style: Late 19th and Early 20th Century Movements
- NRHP reference No.: 74000673
- Added to NRHP: June 25, 1974

The Albany Municipal Auditorium is a multi-purpose auditorium located in downtown Albany, Georgia, U.S. The 965-seat, classic style auditorium includes an orchestra level, as well as first and second balconies and it was listed as "Municipal Auditorium" on the National Register of Historic Places by the United States Department of the Interior in 1975. The auditorium is part of a sports, entertainment and convention complex that also includes the Albany Civic Center and the Veterans Park Amphitheatre.

== History ==
Designed by architect A. Ten Eyck Brown, the Albany Municipal Auditorium was built in 1915 to replace an old wooden auditorium used for Chautauqua programs. The auditorium was host to many talents of the music world, the stage and television, including an Irving Berlin musical road show in the 1920s. In the 1950s and 1960s, telethons were held in the auditorium. These telethons attracted Hollywood stars to Albany, including most of the cast of Bonanza, Wagon Train, The Virginian and starlet Jayne Mansfield. The auditorium was abandoned in 1972 and stood vacant for years. It was added to the National Register of Historic Places on June 25, 1974. Restoration of the auditorium started in 1986. In 1990, the Albany Symphony Orchestra reopened the renovated auditorium, performing a Gala Concert with Albany native Ray Charles.

The Albany Municipal Auditorium is the home of the Albany Symphony Orchestra. The auditorium hosts the Deerfield-Windsor School's annual all-student Spring Musical, Ballet Theatre South's (formerly Albany Ballet Theater) annual production, the annual Andersonville Theological Seminary graduation ceremony and various concerts and stage plays.
