= A. Ten Eyck Brown =

American architect (1878–1940)

Albert Anthony Ten Eyck Brown (1878–1940) was an architect active in Atlanta, Georgia, and other areas. Brown was born in Albany, New York. He studied at the New York Academy of Design.

Several of his works are listed on the U.S. National Register of Historic Places.

== Buildings ==
Buildings designed by Ten Eyck Brown include:

=== Miami, Florida ===
- Dade County Courthouse (1925–28), 73 W. Flagler St., NRHP-listed
- Miami Coliseum (1927), 1500 Douglas Rd.

=== Atlanta, Georgia ===
(in Downtown Atlanta unless otherwise specified)

- Arlington Hall (1918–19) at Lanier University, Morningside-Lenox Park neighborhood
- Bass Furniture Building (1898), 142–150 Mitchell St., NRHP-listed
- Clark Howell Homes (1939–41)
- Forsyth Theatre (1909 - 1929)
- Fulton County Courthouse (1911–1914), 160 Pryor St., SW, NRHP-listed
- Peachtree Arcade (1917–1918), 2 Peachtree St., demolished
- Rialto Theatre (1916-1962)
- St. Anthony of Padua Catholic Church (1908–1923) in the West End neighborhood
- Spotswood Hall (1913, remodeled 1933), residence, 555 Argonne Dr., NW, Buckhead, NRHP-listed
- State Bar of Georgia Building (1918, renovated 1920–1922?), formerly the Federal Reserve Bank of Atlanta
- Sweet Auburn Curb Market (1923)
- Thornton Building (1932), 10 Pryor St. (10 Park Place South), NRHP-listed
- United States Post Office, Federal Annex (1931–33), now the Martin Luther King Jr. Federal Building, 77 Forsyth St., NRHP-listed

=== Atlanta neighborhoods ===
One or more works in the following Atlanta neighborhoods:

- Ansley Park (houses, 1910s)
- Druid Hills (houses, 1910s)
- Pittsburgh, NRHP-listed
- Virginia-Highland, NRHP-listed

=== Outside Atlanta ===
- Albany Municipal Auditorium, 301 Pine Ave., NRHP-listed (1915)
- Athens: buildings in the Downtown Athens Historic District, NRHP-listed
- Canton: Cherokee County Courthouse, 100 North St., NRHP-listed
- Columbus: Silver's Five and Dime Store—H.L. Green Co., 1101–1103 Broadway, NRHP-listed
- Dublin: One or more works in Dublin Commercial Historic District, roughly centered on Jackson Ave. and Lawrence St., NRHP-listed
- Rome: Rome City Hall and Auditorium (1915-1916)
- Spalding County Courthouse (1910) burned down in 1981.

=== Tennessee ===
- Nashville: 226 N. 3rd Ave., NRHP-listed
