= Cherokee County Courthouse (Georgia) =

Historic courthouse in the U.S.

- U.S. National Register of Historic Places
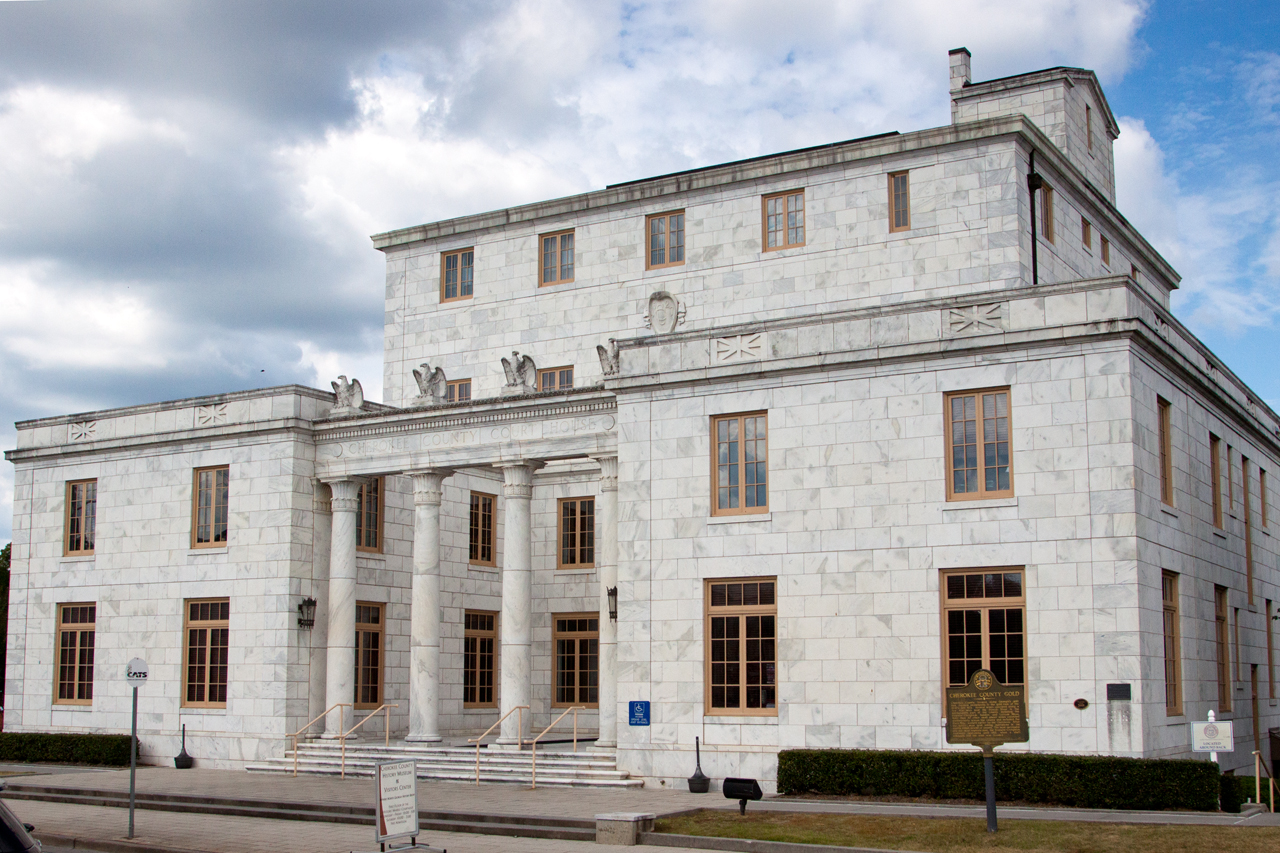

- Location within Georgia Location within the United States
- Location: 100 North St., Canton, Georgia
- Coordinates: 34°14′15″N 84°29′29″W
- Built: 1928
- Built by: McCauley, J. S., Co.
- Architect: Brown, A. Ten Eyck
- Architectural style: Neoclassical
- MPS: Georgia County Courthouses TR
- NRHP reference No.: 81000198
- Added to NRHP: May 28, 1981

Cherokee County Courthouse in Canton, Georgia was built in 1928. It was listed on the National Register of Historic Places in 1981.

The previous courthouse was destroyed in a fire in March 1927. The new one was a five-story Neoclassical Revival building that dominates over Canton's public square. It is significant architecturally in part because it is one of few courthouses in Georgia made of local marble.

It was designed by architect A. Ten Eyck Brown (1878-1940). There was a master sculptor, Jimmy Watt, who supervised other sculptors including David Ashe Herschel Couch and B. Maloni who carved the four eagles above the front portico.
