= Center Hill, Atlanta =

Neighborhood of Atlanta, Georgia

Coordinates: 33.770165°N 84.461894°W

Center Hill is a neighborhood located in northwest Atlanta, Georgia with a population of 4,741. Center Hill is located between Donald L. Hollowell Highway, Hamilton E. Holmes Drive, and Simpson Road. Center Hill is a neighborhood in Atlanta, Georgia. Many retirees live in Center Hill and residents tend to be liberal.

== Center Hill Neighborhood Association ==
Center Hill Neighborhood Association (CHNA) was formed by a coalition of Center Hill neighbors with the goal to engage neighbors and steer development in the community. Center Hill is part of Atlanta's NPU-J.

== Schools ==
- Williams Elementary School
- Benjamin S. Carson Honors Preparatory School
- Douglass High School
- Greater Atlanta Adventist Academy
