= Architecture of Atlanta =

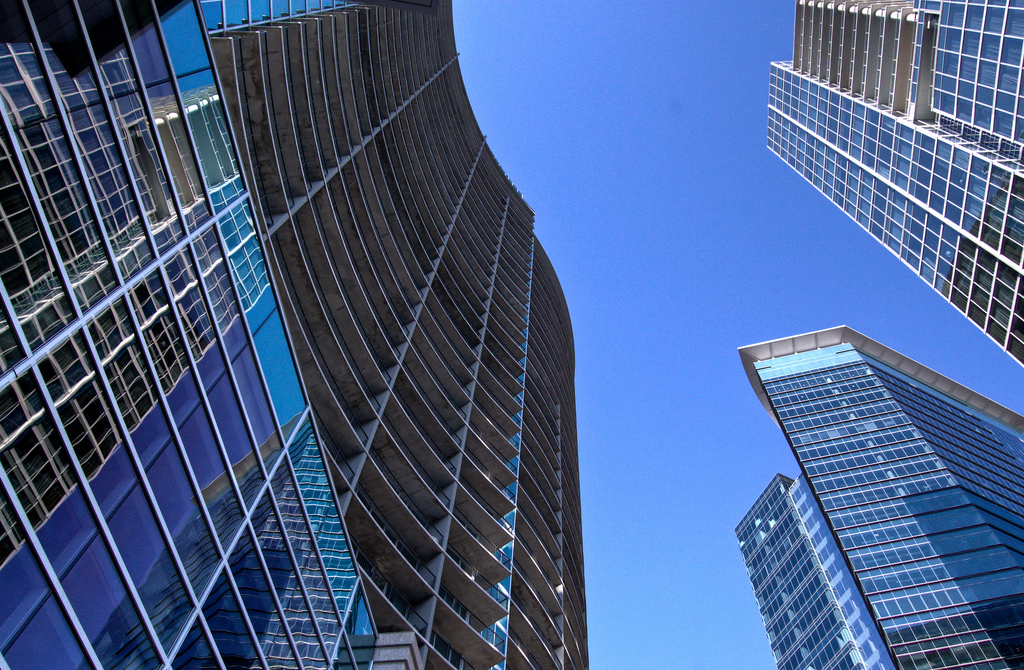
Modern glass structures on Peachtree Street

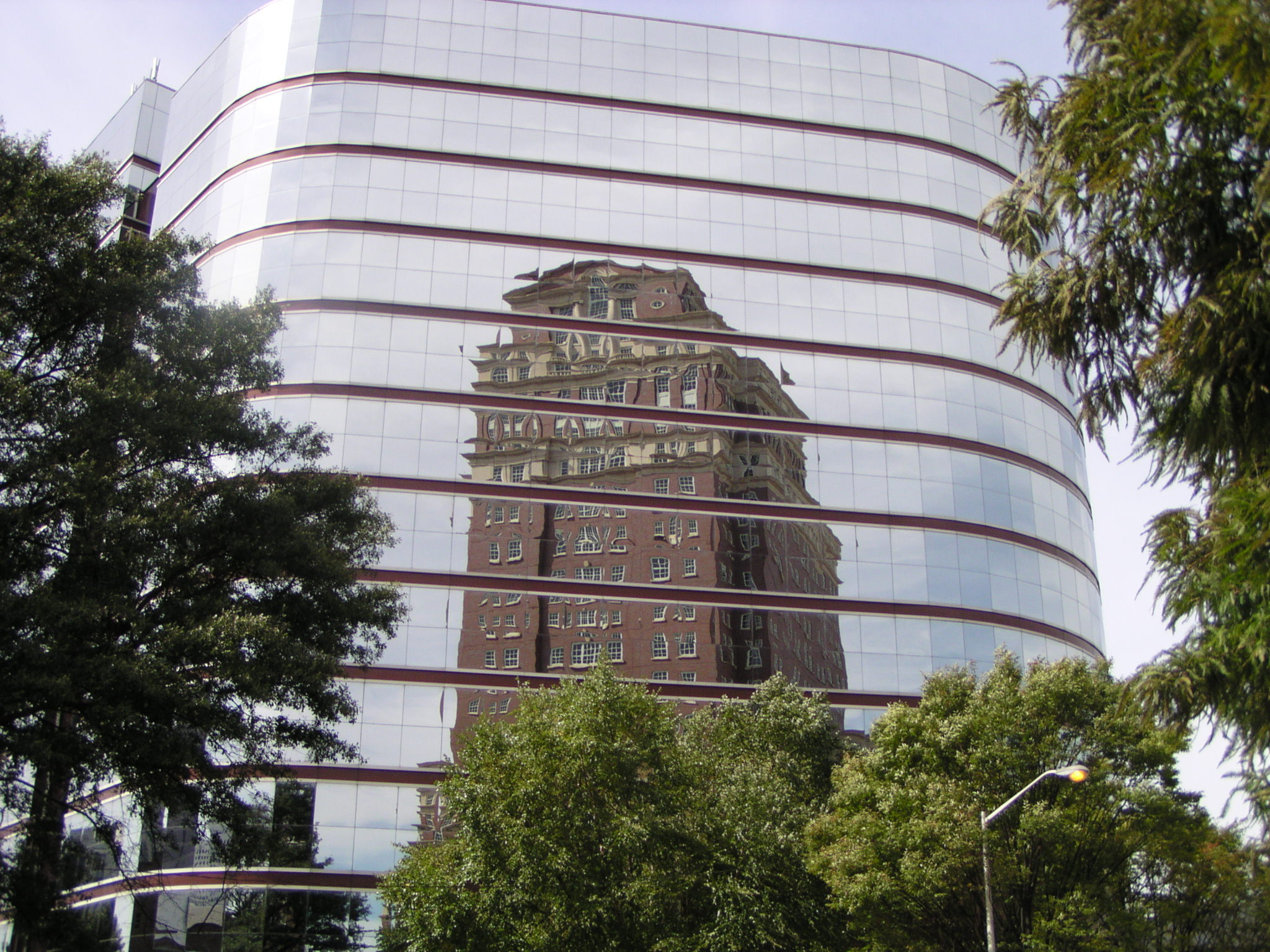
In Midtown, the windows of a 1990s-era post-modern structure reflect a classical-style building

The architecture of Atlanta is marked by a confluence of classical, modernist, post-modernist, and contemporary architectural styles. Due to the Battle of Atlanta and the subsequent fire in 1864, the city's architecture retains almost no traces of its Antebellum past. Instead, Atlanta's status as a largely post-modern American city is reflected in its architecture, as the city has often been the earliest, if not the first, to showcase new architectural concepts. However, Atlanta's embrace of modernism has translated into an ambivalence toward architectural preservation, resulting in the destruction of architectural masterpieces, including the Commercial-style Equitable Building (Atlanta's first skyscraper), the Beaux-Arts style Terminal Station, and the Classical Carnegie Library. The city's cultural icon, the Neo-Moorish Fox Theatre, would have met the same fate had it not been for a grassroots effort to save it in the mid-1970s.

== History ==
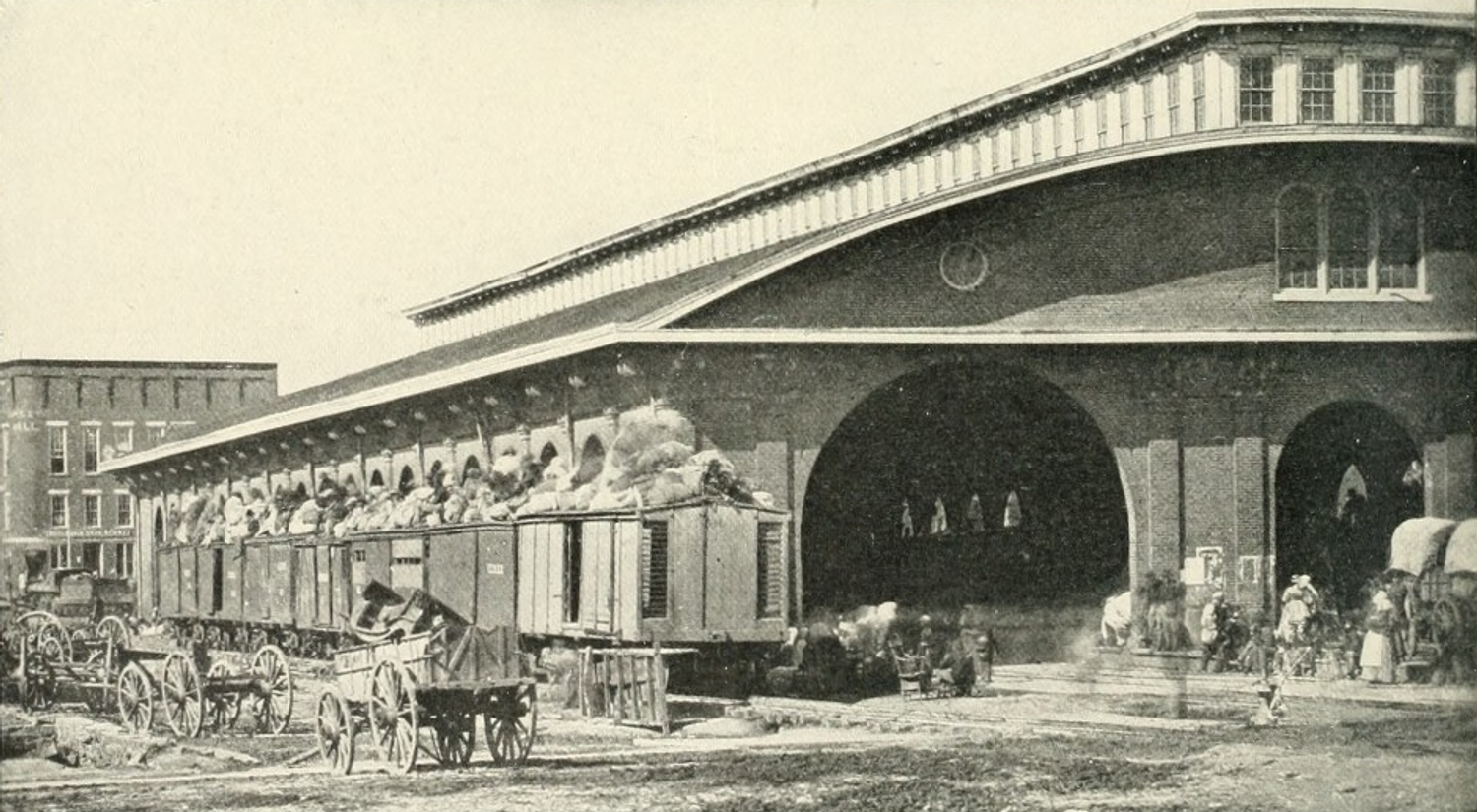
The 1853 Union Station shortly before Union troops destroyed it in 1864

=== Antebellum ===
Because Atlanta was a settlement that grew from a planned railroad terminus and later a railroad junction, rather than being planned in a grand manner, its antebellum architecture was unremarkable compared to patrician Savannah or other older Southern cities. The town's most important buildings included Edward A. Vincent's Union Station (1853), the Atlanta, Trout House and Washington Hall hotels, and the Atlanta Bank. An 1859 industrial journal noted that:

19 commodious brick stores were erected in 1858…besides a large number of fine residences, mostly of brick. Many of the new improvements are imposing structures, and would not suffer by comparison with the most elegant portions of our modern cities.

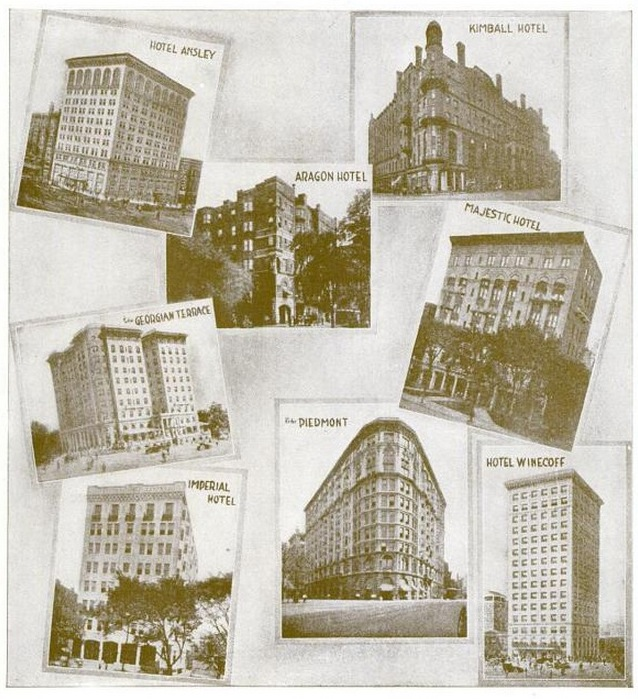
Hotel architecture, 1916

Not a single antebellum building from what was the town of Atlanta remains today. Remaining antebellum architecture inside the city limits consists of four houses that were well outside the city limits in the 19th century, as well as the Tullie Smith House which was moved to the Atlanta History Center from a location in North Druid Hills, an adjacent suburb. The oldest building in Downtown Atlanta is the Georgia Railroad Freight Depot (1869).

=== Postbellum ===
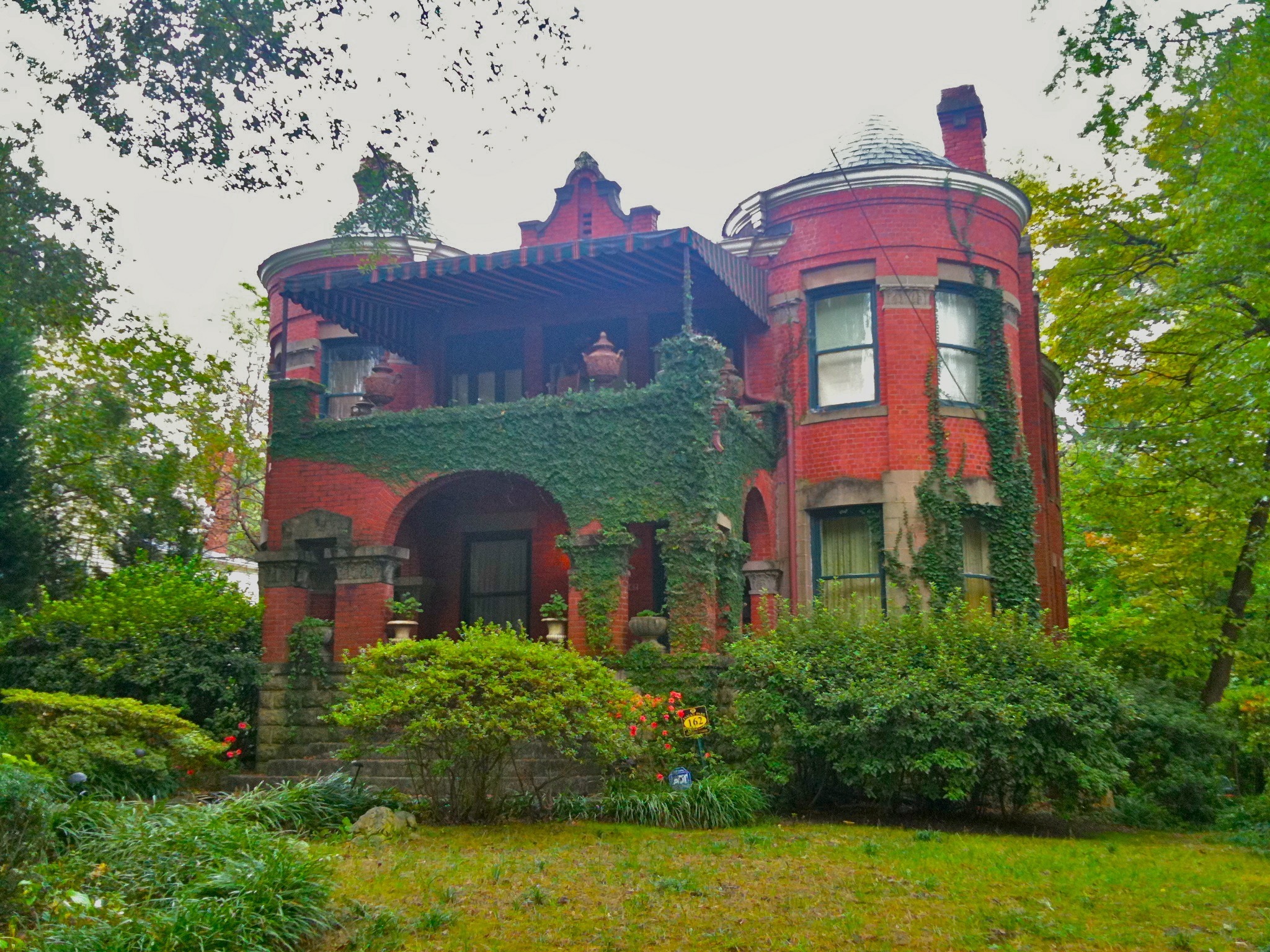
Victorian architecture in Inman Park

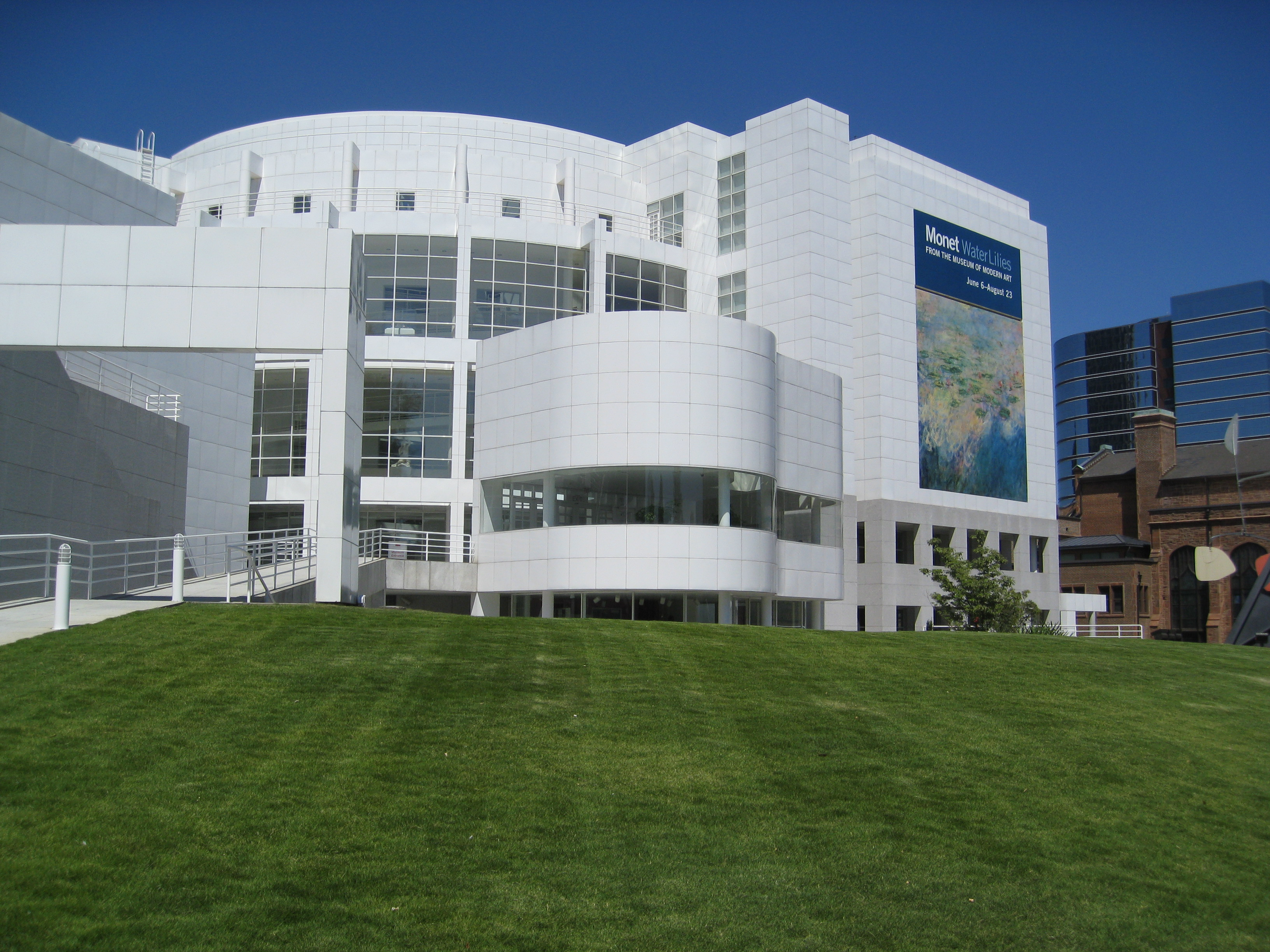
High Museum of Art (1983), designed by Richard Meier

Most of Atlanta was burned during the Civil War, depleting the city of a large stock of its historic architecture. Yet Atlanta, architecturally, had never been particularly "southern." Because Atlanta originated as a railroad town, rather than a patrician southern seaport like Savannah or Charleston, many of the city's landmarks could have easily been erected in the Northeast or Midwest, and indeed this was one reason why Atlanta referred to itself frequently as "the New York" or "the Chicago of the South."

Throughout the American Renaissance and beyond, Atlantans were amazed at successive waves of ever more impressive hotels, civic and industrial architecture, and office buildings, such as the Equitable Building (8 stories, 1892), Candler Building (17 stories, 1906), and Rhodes-Haverty Building (21 stories, 1929). Among the most notable architects active in Atlanta between the Civil War and World War Two were A. Ten Eyck Brown, Francis Palmer Smith and G. Lloyd Preacher.

=== Cold War Era ===
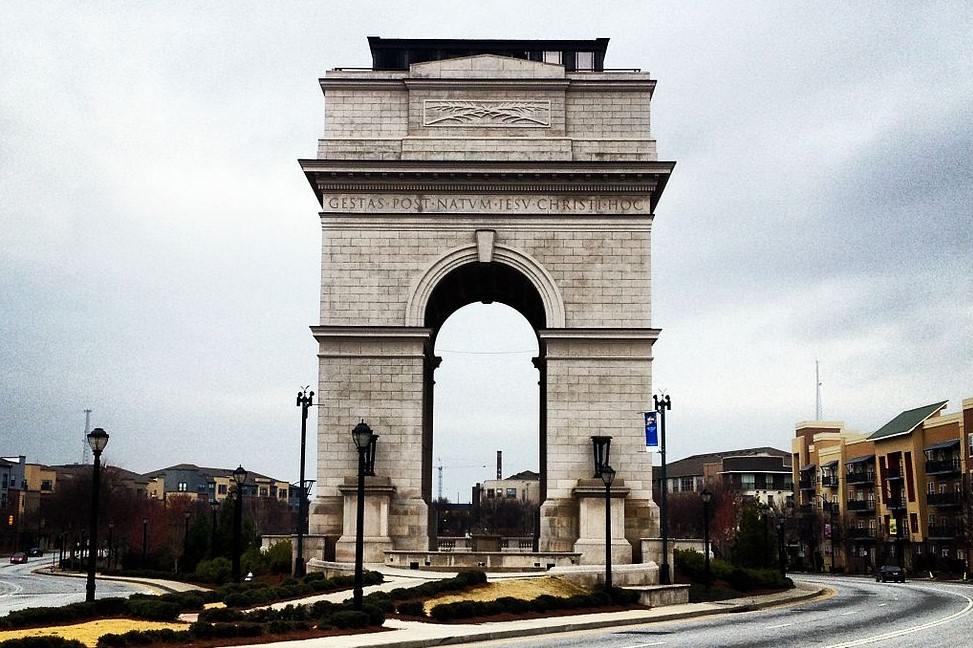
The classical Millennium Gate (2008)

During the Cold War era, Atlanta followed global modernist trends, especially with regards to office towers and commercial buildings. Examples of modernist architecture include the Westin Peachtree Plaza (1976), Georgia-Pacific Tower (1982), the State of Georgia Building (1966), and the Atlanta Marriott Marquis (1985).

The era's most notable architect may be Atlanta-native John Portman, whose Hyatt Regency Hotel (1968) made a significant mark on the hospitality sector. A graduate of Georgia Tech's College of Architecture, Portman's work reshaped downtown Atlanta with his designs for the Atlanta Merchandise Mart, Peachtree Center, the Westin Peachtree Plaza Hotel, and Truist Plaza.

=== Contemporary Era ===
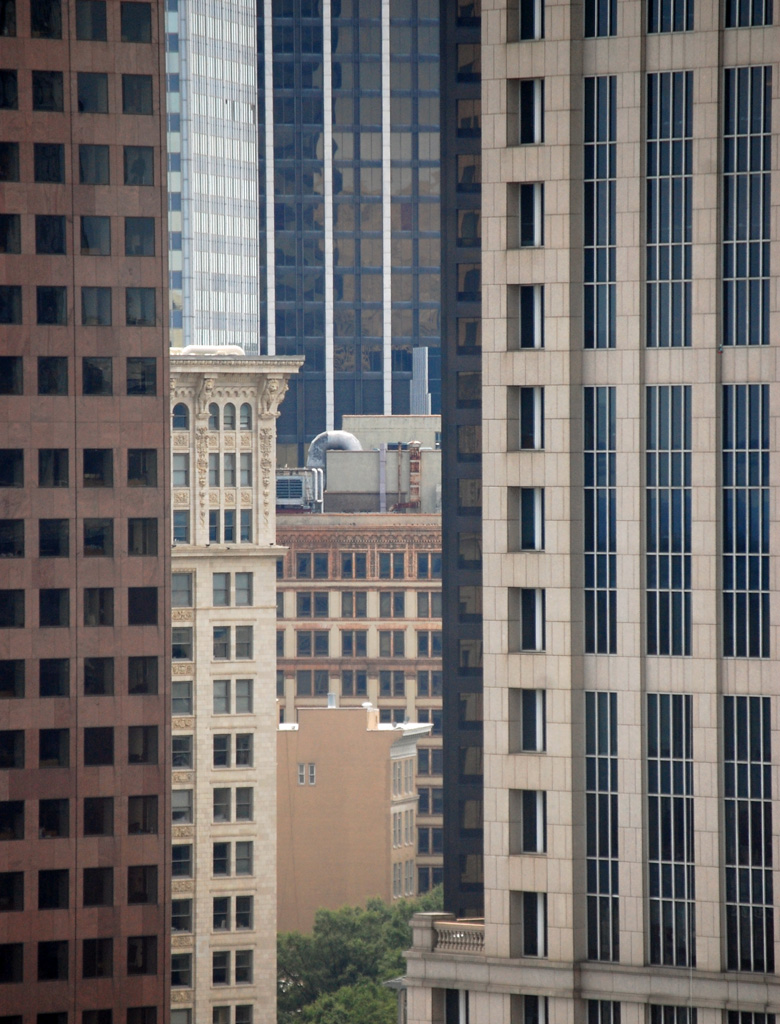
Architectural contrast in Downtown office buildings

In the latter half of the 1980s, Atlanta became one of the early-adopters of postmodern designs which reintroduced classical elements to the cityscape. Many of Atlanta's tallest skyscrapers were built from the late 1980s to the early 1990s, with most displaying tapering spires or otherwise ornamented crowns, such as One Atlantic Center (1987), 191 Peachtree Tower (1991), and the Four Seasons Hotel Atlanta (1992). And at 1,023 feet (312 m), Atlanta's tallest skyscraper—the Bank of America Plaza (1992)—is the 61st-tallest building in the world and the 9th tallest building in the United States.

More recently, Atlanta's built environment has been getting more eclectic and diverse. For example, 3344 Peachtree (2008) is more in the glass-walled modernist vein, while Millennium Gate (also completed in 2008) is the largest classical monument in the U.S. to have been dedicated since completion of the Jefferson Memorial in Washington, D.C.

=== Repurposed industrial architecture ===
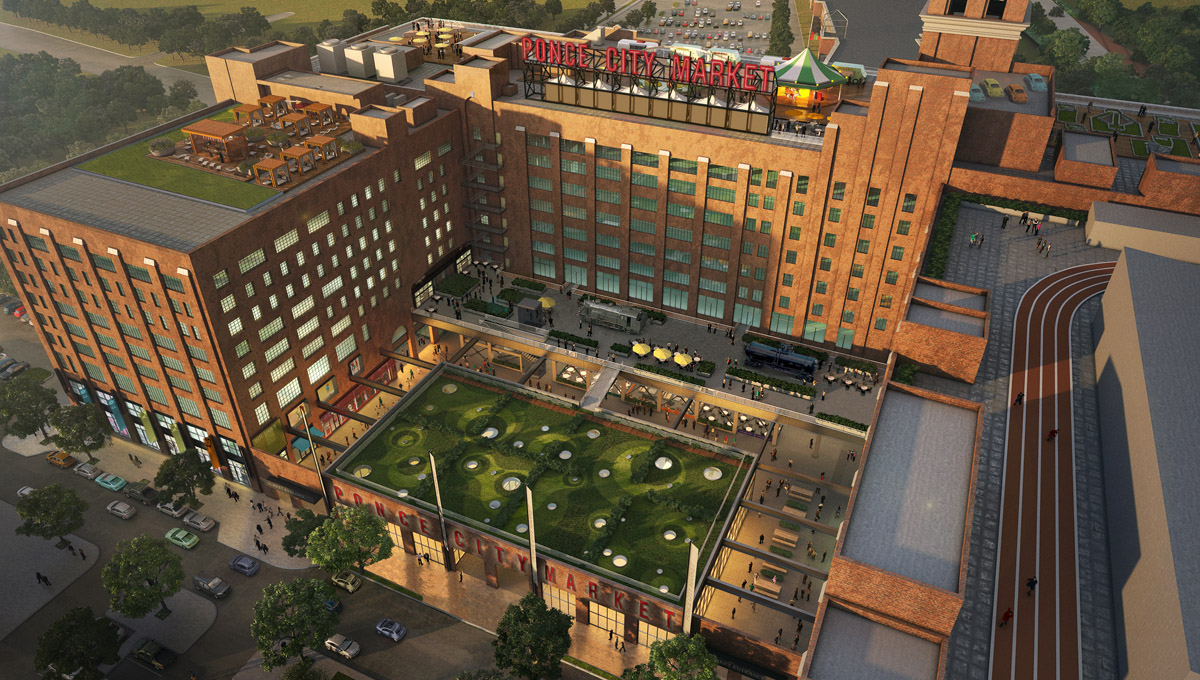
Ponce City Market multi-use complex, formerly the Sears, Roebuck warehouse for the southeastern U.S.

With the dawn of the twenty-first century, many former industrial buildings were repurposed for residential and retail use, many along the BeltLine, former railroad rights-of-way which became a ring of trails around the central city. Examples are Ponce City Market, Krog Street Market, Telephone Factory Lofts, Fulton Bag and Cotton Mills, King Plow and Goat Farm Arts Centers and many others, particularly in the Old Fourth Ward, Inman Park Village, Cabbagetown and Reynoldstown, and the Marietta Street Artery.

== Notable Architecture ==
Arts facilities have led the way for modernists in Atlanta architecture with the High Museum designed by Richard Meier with a 2005 addition by Renzo Piano. A recent design competition resulted in Freelon Associates (in conjunction with HOK) being selected as the architect for the new $100 million home of the Center for Civil and Human Rights. Michael Graves' post-modern style is exhibited in the Ten Peachtree Place office building in Midtown and the Michael C. Carlos Museum on the campus of Emory University. The 50-story One Atlantic Center was designed by Philip Johnson in association with John Burgee. Completed in 1980, the Atlanta-Fulton Central Public Library was designed by one of the 20th century's most notable modernists architects, Marcel Breuer, who holds the distinction of having studied and taught at the Bauhaus, where early in his career Breuer first became a renowned furniture designer. Atlanta also has its own Flatiron Building, built in 1897, five years before the more famous Flatiron Building in New York City (1902).

=== Skyscrapers ===
Rank	Name	Height ft (m)	Floors	Year	Notes
1	Bank of America Plaza	1,023 (312)	55	1992	63rd-tallest building in the world, 10th-tallest in the U.S. Has been the tallest building in Atlanta, Georgia and the Southern United States since 1992. Tallest building in any U.S. state capital.
2	Truist Plaza	871 (265)	60	1992	77th-tallest building in the world, 25th-tallest in the U.S.
3	One Atlantic Center	820 (250)	50	1987	125th-tallest building in the world, 38th-tallest in the U.S. Also known as the IBM Tower.
4	191 Peachtree Tower	770 (235)	50	1990	200th-tallest building in the world, 57th-tallest in the U.S.
5	Westin Peachtree Plaza Hotel	723 (220)	73	1976	93rd-tallest building in the U.S. Stood as the tallest all-hotel building in the world from 1976 until 1977.
6	Georgia-Pacific Tower	697 (212)	52	1982	Total building area is 1,567,011 sq.ft.
7	Promenade II	691 (211)	38	1990	
8	Tower Square	677 (206)	47	1982	Also known as the BellSouth Building.
9	3344 Peachtree	665 (203)	48	2008	Also known as the Sovereign.
10	1180 Peachtree	657 (200)	41	2006	Formerly known as the Symphony Center.

== Firms, Universities, and Organizations ==
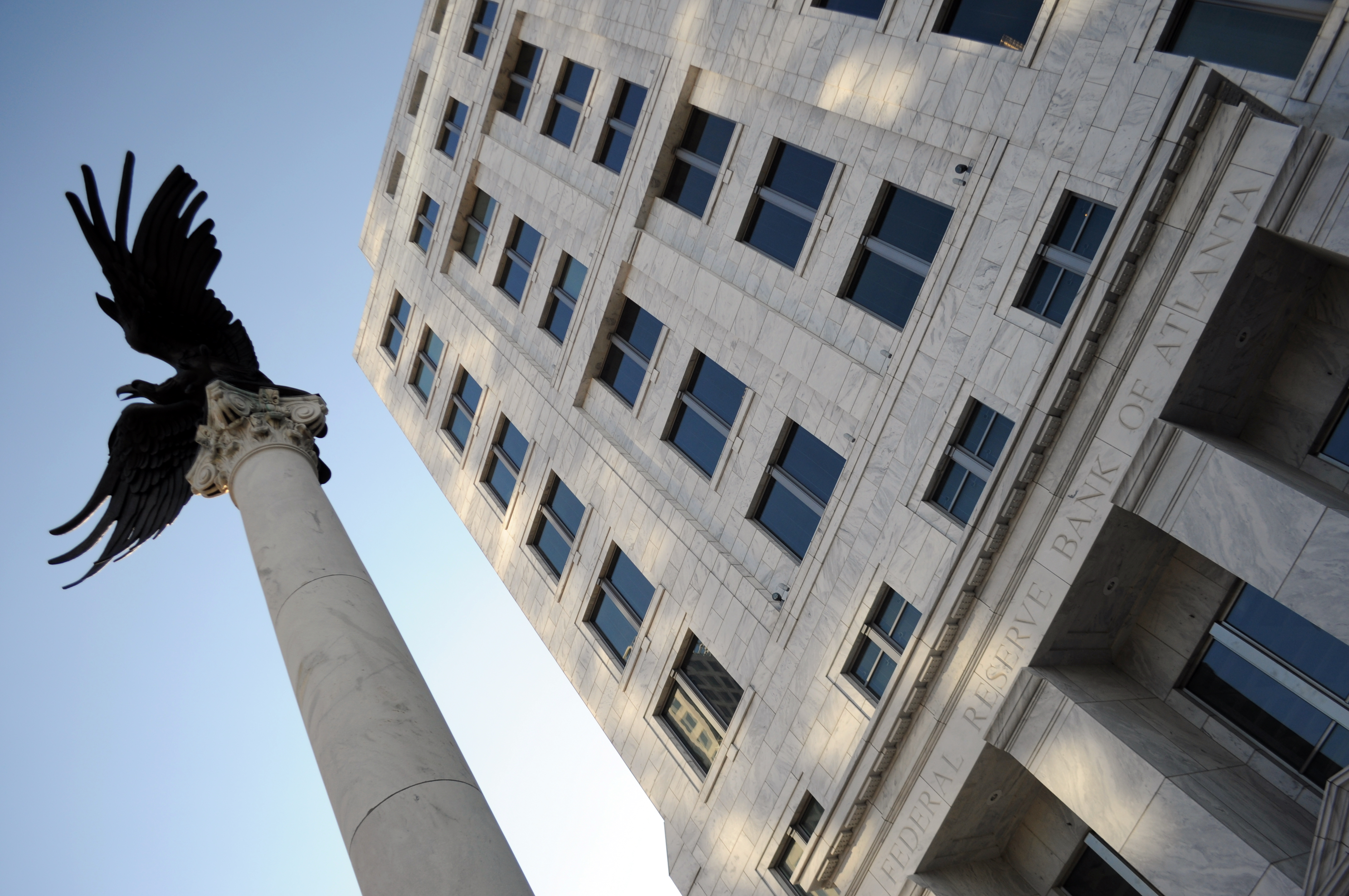
The classical Federal Reserve Bank of Atlanta at 1000 Peachtree Street

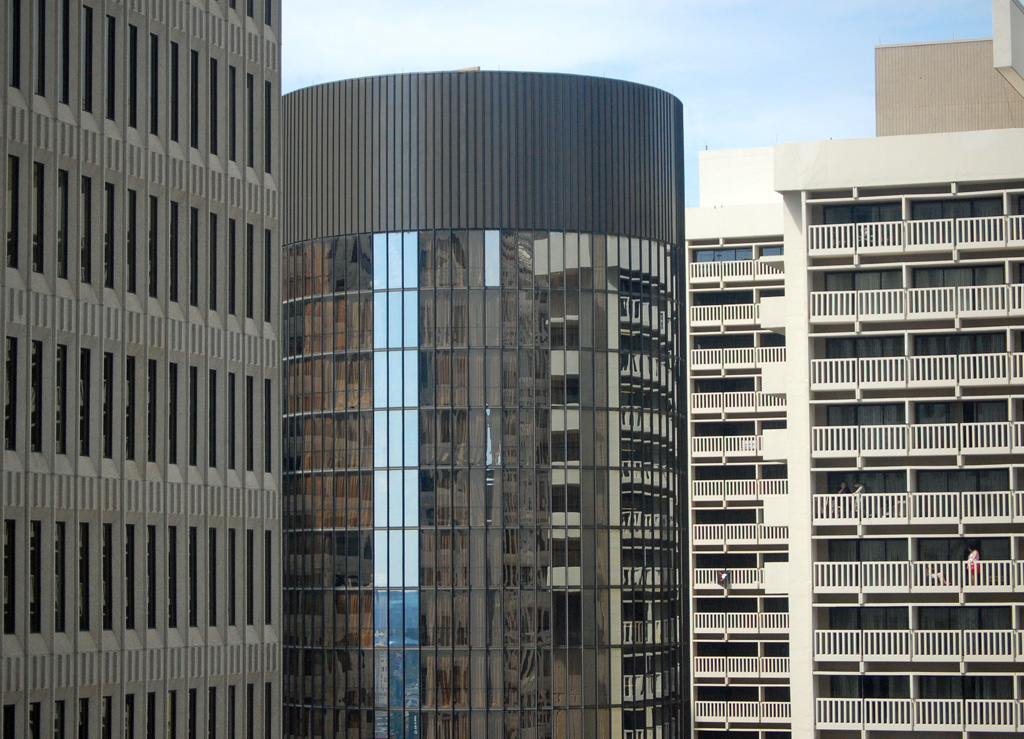
Peachtree Center, exhibiting the contributions of John Portman

Atlanta is home to the award-winning, internationally acclaimed Mack Scogin Merrill Elam Architects (formerly Scogin, Elam and Bray Architects). Contemporary practices include BLDGS, Lightroom, Dencity, G+G Architects, Houser Walker Architecture, plexus r+d, Smith Dalia, Square Feet Studio, and Robert M. Cain, Architect. Large firms include Stevens & Wilkinson, Perkins and Will (Owned by Dar Al-Handasah), Collins Cooper Carusi, TVS (Thompson, Ventulett, Stainback & Associates), Lord Aeck Sargent, Smallwood, Reynolds, Stewart, Stewart & Associates, and Cooper Carry Inc.

The Georgia Institute of Technology College of Architecture, located just west of midtown Atlanta offers both pre-professional undergraduate and professional graduate degrees in architecture, and hosts regular lectures and symposia of interest to students and professionals. Kennesaw State University formerly known as Southern Polytechnic State University in Marietta, a suburb of Atlanta, offers a five-year professional undergraduate degree and also hosts lectures and exhibits works in the architecture building's gallery space.

The Young Architects Forum of the Atlanta chapter of the American Institute of Architects sponsors open design competitions, exhibits, and lectures of interest to the profession and the general public.
