= Coastal States Building =

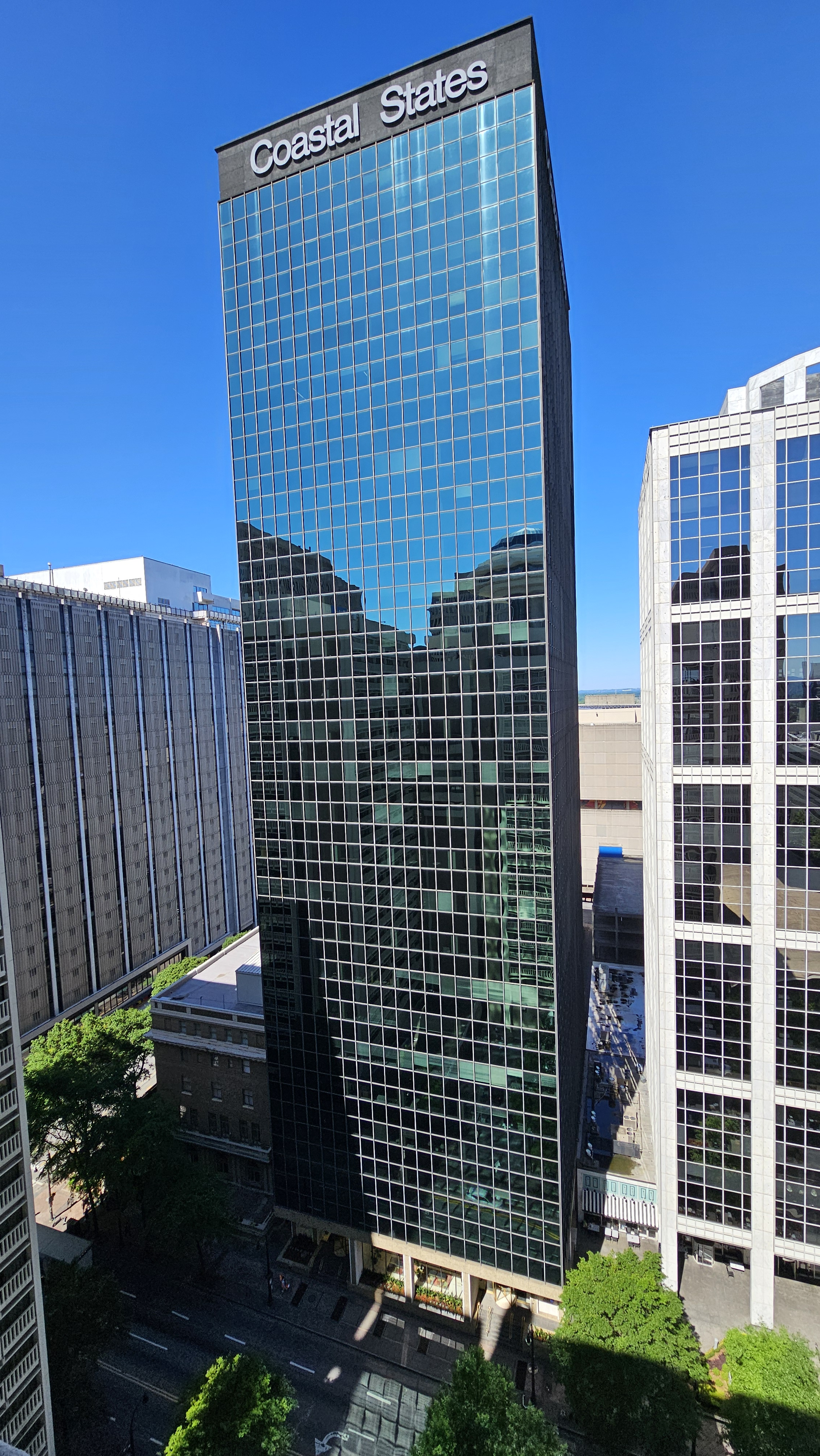
- The building in 2024
- Interactive map of the Coastal States Building area

General information
- Status: Completed
- Type: Commercial offices
- Location: 260 Peachtree Street NE; Atlanta, Georgia 30303
- Coordinates: 33.760257°N 84.387072°W
- Construction started: 1970
- Completed: 1971

Height
- Roof: 115 m (377 ft)

Technical details
- Floor count: 27

Design and construction
- Architects: Sidney R. Barrett & Associates

The Coastal States Building is a high-rise office building located at 260 Peachtree Street in Downtown Atlanta, Georgia. The building was completed in 1971, and designed by Sidney R. Barrett & Associates. It has 27 floors. The building underwent a $28 million renovation that was completed in 2001. It is similar in design to Regions Center in Birmingham, Alabama.

The building was acquired by Richard Bowers & Co. in 1999. It houses the office of Atlanta magazine.

== See also ==
- Architecture of Atlanta
- List of tallest buildings in Atlanta
