= OshKosh B'gosh =

American children's apparel company

- Formerly: Grove Manufacturing Company (1895–1896); Oshkosh Clothing and Manufacturing Co. (1896–1937)
- Type: Subsidiary
- Industry: Clothing
- Founded: 1895 in Oshkosh, Wisconsin, US
- Founders: Frank E. Grove; J. Howard Jenkins; James Clark
- Headquarters: Phipps Tower, Atlanta, Georgia, US
- Number of locations: 345 (January 2026)
- Products: Apparel
- Parent: Carter's (since 2005)
- Website: www.carters.com/b/oshkosh

OshKosh B'gosh is an American children's apparel company founded in Oshkosh, Wisconsin. It is a subsidiary of Carter's.

OshKosh B'gosh has become best known for its children's clothing, especially bibbed overalls. The original children's overalls, dating from the early 20th century, were intended to let parents dress their children like their fathers. According to the company, sales of the product increased after Miles Kimball, an Oshkosh-based mail order catalog, featured a pair of the overalls in its national catalog in 1960. As a result, OshKosh began to sell their products through department stores and expanded their children's line.

== History ==
The company was founded in 1895 as the Grove Manufacturing Company by Frank E. Grove, J. Howard Jenkins, and James Clark. Grove was soon bought out of the company and it was renamed Oshkosh Clothing and Manufacturing Co. in December 1896. OshKosh B'gosh's most notable product was hickory striped overalls. The term B'gosh began being used in 1911, after general manager William Pollock heard the tagline "Oshkosh B'Gosh" in a vaudeville routine in New York. The company formally adopted the name OshKosh B'gosh in 1937.

Children's clothing made up less than 50 percent of the company's sales in 1980; by 1984 that number had grown to about 80 percent.

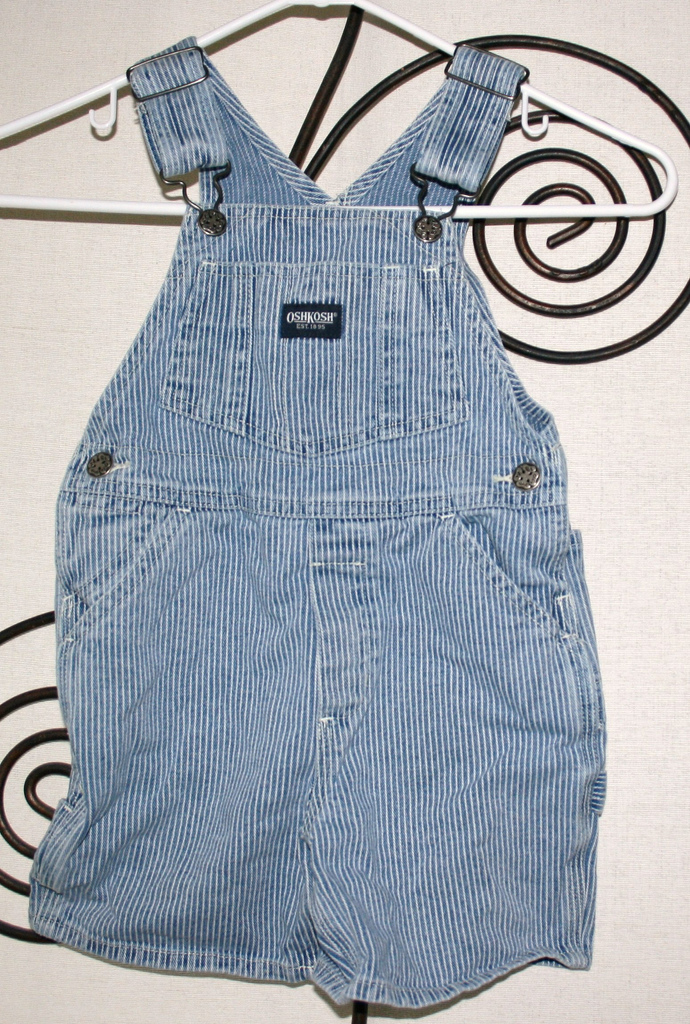
An example of Oshkosh shortalls in the hickory stripe style.

OshKosh B'gosh's Wisconsin plant closed in 1997. Downsizing of domestic operations and massive outsourcing and manufacturing at Mexican and Honduran subsidiaries saw the domestic manufacturing share drop below 10 percent by the year 2000.

In 2005, OshKosh B'gosh was sold to Carter's, another clothing manufacturer, for $312 million. However, it still operates under the original name.

Today the company sells accessories, jeans, pants, shirts, sweaters, t-shirts, tank tops, and its trademark overalls. The company produces clothing for infants and children aged 1–14; however, it no longer manufactures clothing in adult sizes. As of January 2026, the company operates over 340 stores in the US.

== Headquarters ==
The company is headquartered in Phipps Tower in Atlanta's Buckhead district.
