= Promenade (building) =

Building in Atlanta, Georgia, United States

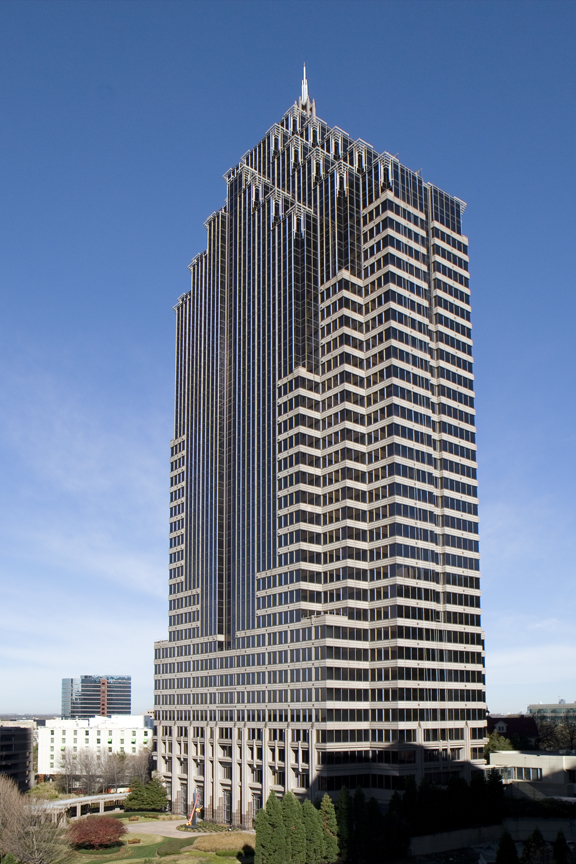
- Promenade II in 2006

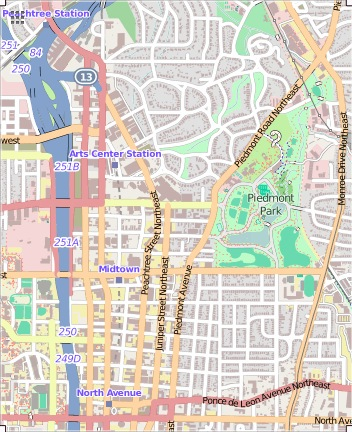
- Location within Atlanta Midtown Location within Atlanta Location within Georgia Location within the United States

Record height
- Preceded by: One Atlantic Center

General information
- Location: 1230 Peachtree Street Northeast; Atlanta, Georgia
- Coordinates: 33°47′17″N 84°23′7″W
- Completed: 1990

Height
- Roof: 691 feet (211 m)

Technical details
- Floor count: 38
- Floor area: 774,000 sq ft (71,900 m^{2}).
- Lifts/elevators: 18

Design and construction
- Architect: Thompson, Ventulett, Stainback & Associates

Website
- promenadeatlanta.com

Promenade (formerly Promenade II) is a 691 feet (211 m) tall skyscraper in Midtown Atlanta. It has 40 stories of office space and its construction was completed in 1990. It is currently the seventh-tallest skyscraper in Atlanta.

Set just off Peachtree Street on 15th Street, it sits on the same block as One Atlantic Center and was only the second major office tower in Midtown. It is set diagonally to the street grid to maximize its impact on the skyline and allow tenants better views. It is clad in reflective glass and has a ziggurat-like tapering spire with stainless steel fins that are lit at night. Promenade was intended to be the first of three towers of identical design on the block that it occupies. The two other towers, of 48 and 58 stories, were never built due to the collapse of the commercial real estate market in the early 1990s. Promenade itself was originally planned for 857 feet (261 m) (57 stories) but was scaled back before completion due to the market collapse. The land they were to occupy is now home to the 41-story 1180 Peachtree Street office tower.

The architectural firms that worked on this project were Thompson, Ventulett, Stainback & Associates (TVS) and the Ai Group. TVS, which was also responsible for the Concourse at Landmark Center highrise development on Atlanta's northern edge, had its headquarters in the building until it moved to 1200 Peachtree Street in 2023. The engineering firm that worked on the Promenade was Thompson Company, Inc. (TCI). TCI is also responsible for the Concourse at Landmark Center.

On August 22, 2014, one of the largest tenants in Promenade II filed a lawsuit in an attempt to stop owner Cousins from placing signage on three sites of the tower. In a court filing in support of the legal action, Thomas Ventulett III, one of the lead architects on Promenade II, said the signage would "certainly diminish the dignified character and aesthetic design of the spire and lighting at the top of the building."

== See also ==
- List of tallest buildings in Atlanta
