= The Proscenium =

Skyscraper in Atlanta, United States

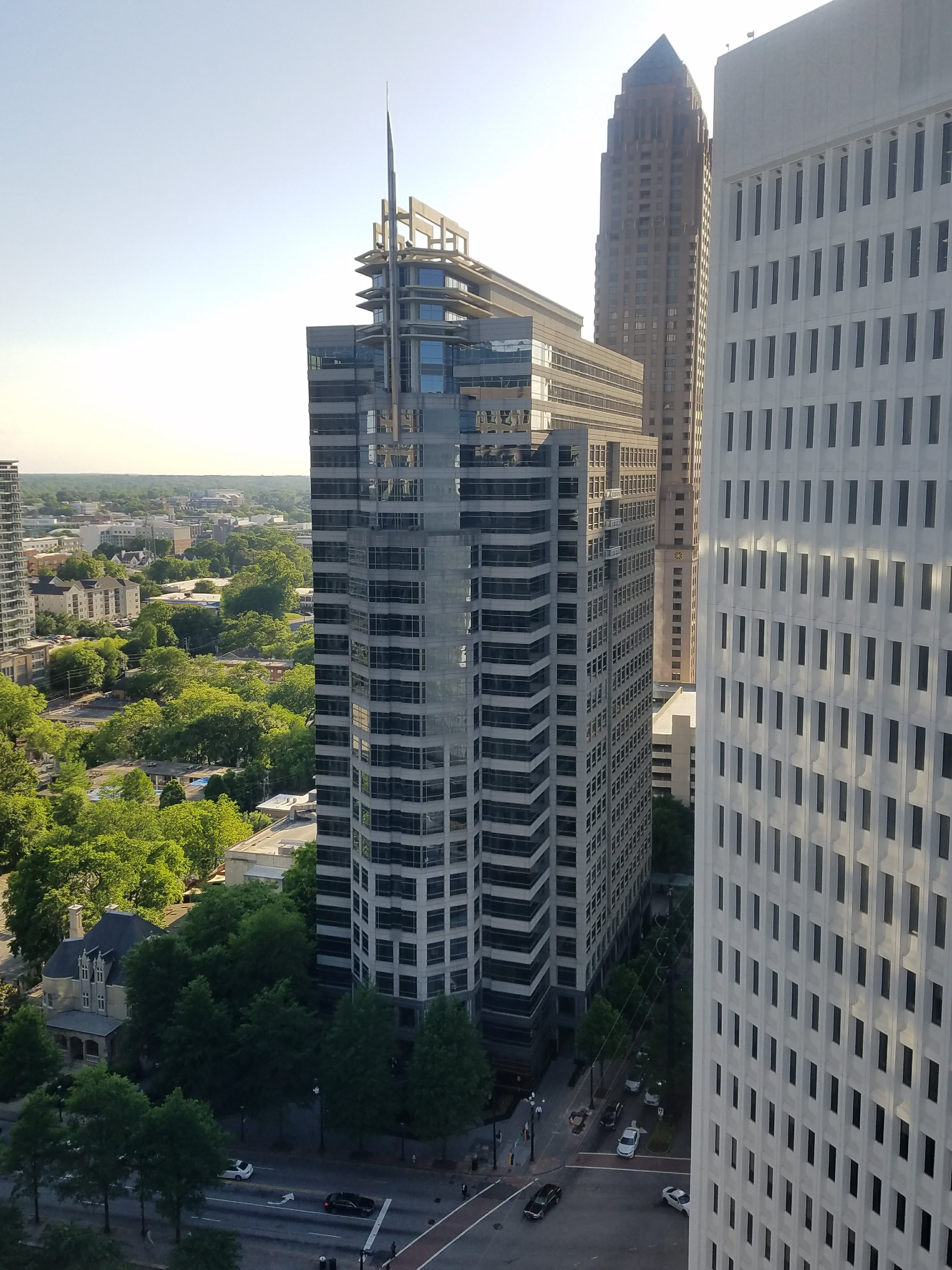
- The Eastern side of The Proscenium

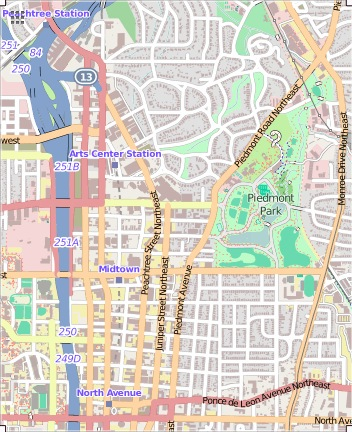
- location in Midtown Atlanta

General information
- Status: Completed
- Type: high-rise building
- Location: 1170 Peachtree St NE, Atlanta, Georgia
- Coordinates: 33.78644°N 84.38422°W
- Construction started: 1999
- Opening: 2001

Height
- Roof: 321.46 ft (98 m)

Technical details
- Floor count: 25 above ground, 3 below

Design and construction
- Architect: Tvsdesign

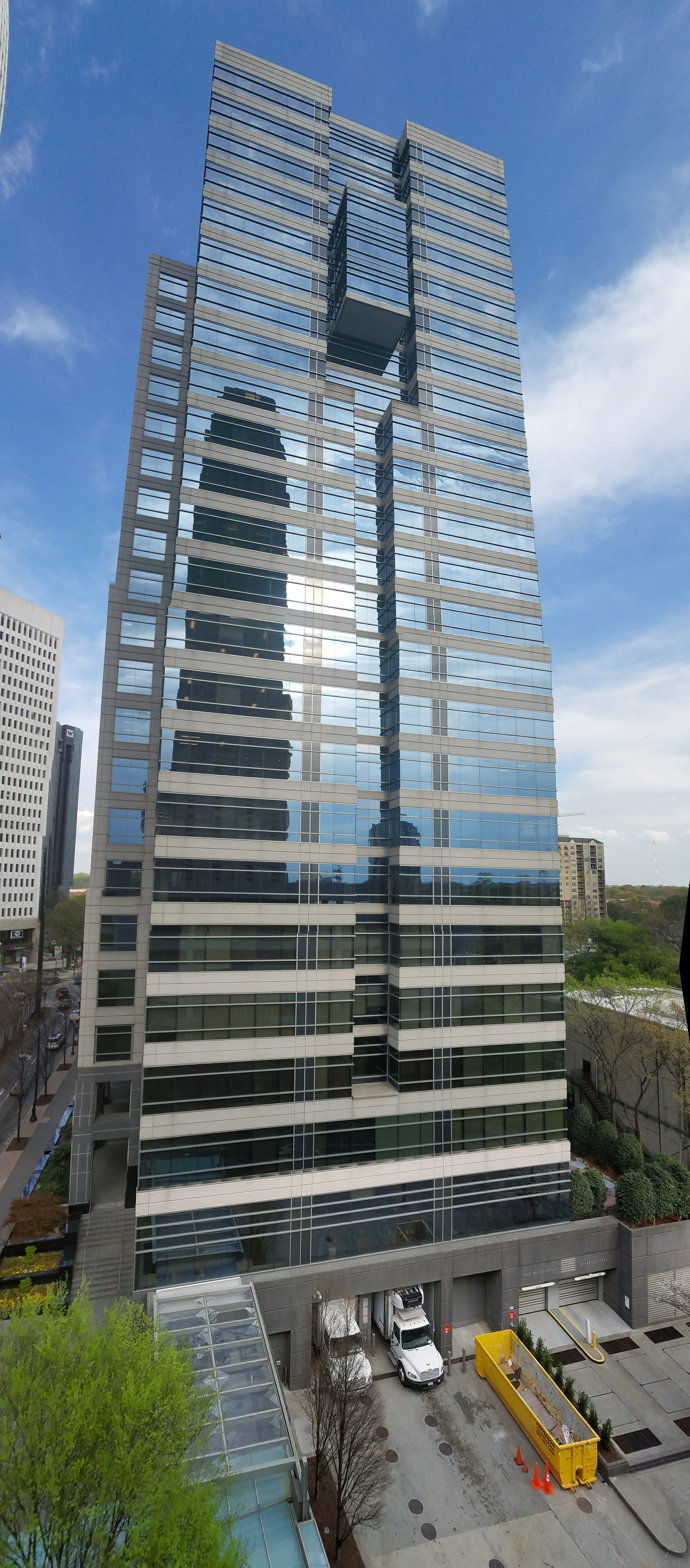
The Proscenium as viewed from the West

The Proscenium is a 24-story office building in Midtown Atlanta, United States.

== History ==
The Proscenium was constructed in 2001.

In October 2012 the Atlanta Business Chronicle reported that Carter's Inc. was likely to lease in the Phipps Tower in Buckhead for its headquarters. In December 2012 Carter's Inc. announced that it was moving its headquarters from Midtown Atlanta. The lease of 222,730 square feet (20,692 m^{2}) of space is one if the largest headquarters leases to have occurred to date. The estimated value of the lease, except for concessions and escalation, was $70 million. The lease in Midtown was scheduled to be terminated on December 31, 2013. Manulife Financial Corp owns both the Proscenium and the Phipps Tower so Carter's terminated its lease early in one building and moved to the other.

In May 2013 Ionic Security signed a 7,500-square-foot (700 m^{2}) lease.

== Headquarters ==
Carter's, Inc. has its headquarters in Suite 900
