= Music City Center =

Convention center in Nashville, Tennessee, United States

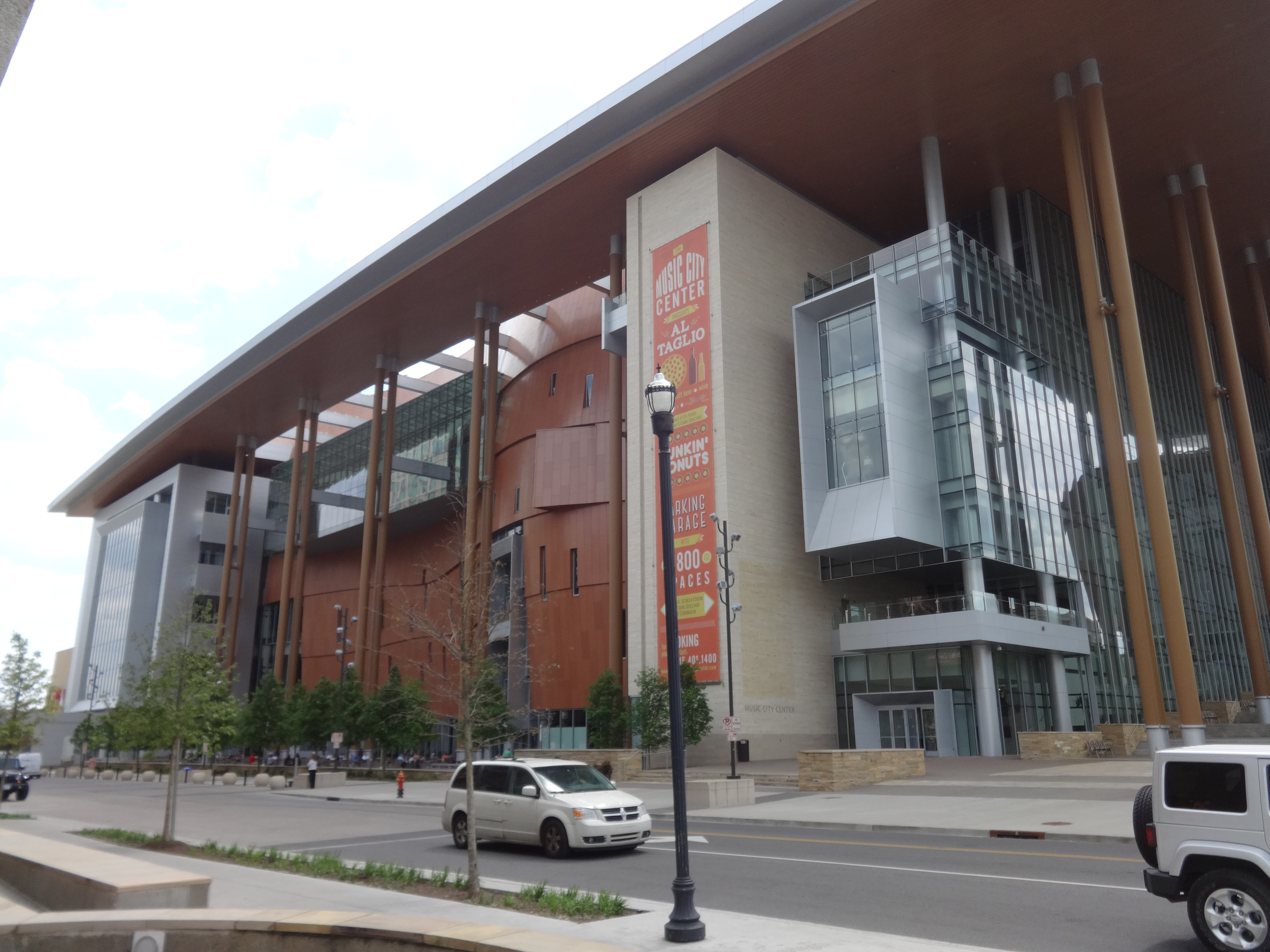
- Interactive map of Music City Center
- Address: 201 5th Avenue South
- Location: Nashville, Tennessee
- Coordinates: 36.1566°N 86.7784°W
- Owner: City of Nashville
- Operator: The Convention Center Authority
- Capacity: Detailed venue capacity: Karl F. Dean Ballroom: 7,453; Exhibit Hall: 34,205

Construction
- Opened: 2013
- Cost: $623 million ($861 million in 2025 dollars)
- Architects: tvsdesign Tuck-Hinton Architects; Moody Nolan

Website
- www.nashvillemusiccitycenter.com

The Music City Center is a convention complex located in downtown Nashville, Tennessee, United States. It opened in May 2013.

The complex was designed by tvsdesign with Tuck-Hinton Architects and Moody Nolan. It was developed by Nashville Metropolitan Development and Housing Agency. It covers an area of 2,100,000 sq ft (195,096 m^{2}) and was built at a cost of about $623 million. The 2.1 million square foot facility has hosted many music and expo events. However, there are plans to add over 300,000 square feet to the facility because many events were cancelled because of the lack of space. Additionally, in July of 2025, the Boring Company, owned by Elon Musk, announced that they would be installing an underground station underneath the Music City Center as part of their Music City look project, specifically phase one. Work is to be completed around late 2026 or early 2027 for phase one, allowing passengers from the Music City Center to get to the airport in a Tesla tunnel.
