= 191 Peachtree Tower =

Skyscraper in Atlanta, Georgia

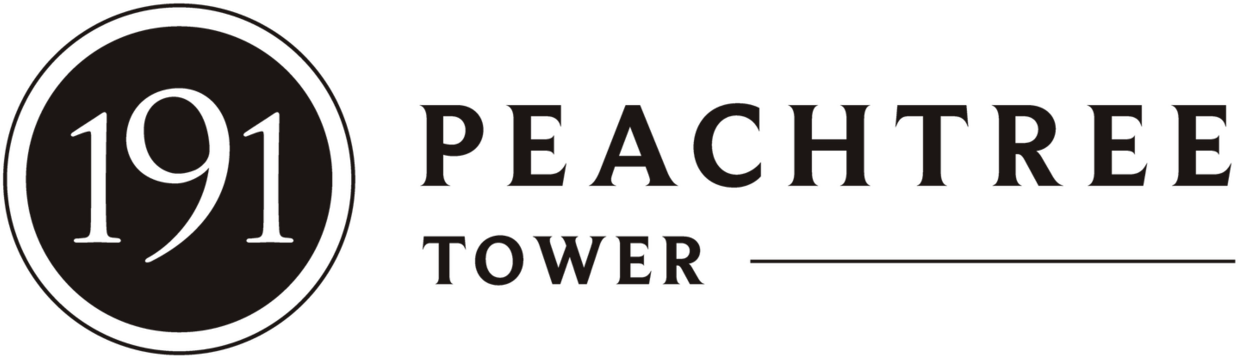

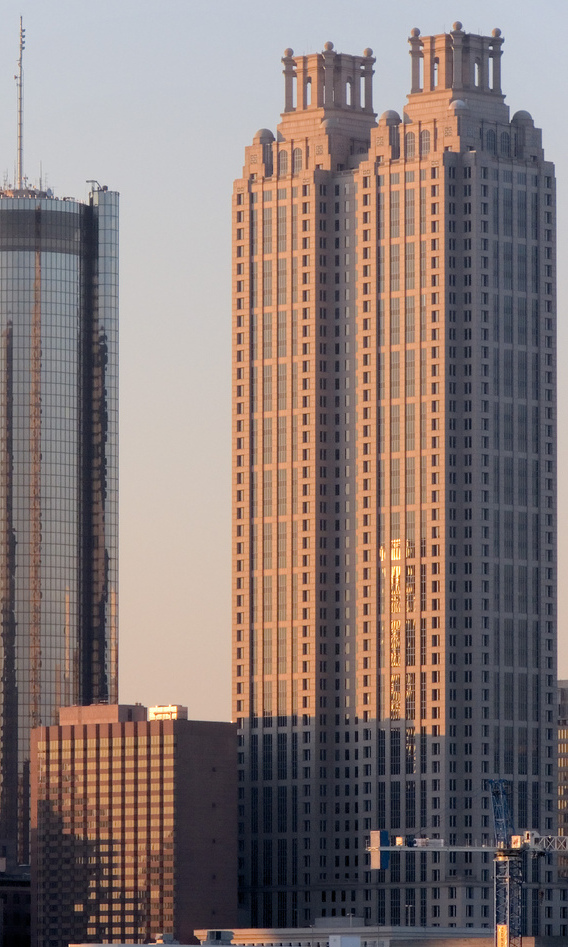
- 191 Peachtree Tower in 2015
- Interactive map of the 191 Peachtree Tower area

General information
- Type: Commercial offices
- Location: 191 Peachtree Street Northeast; Atlanta, Georgia
- Coordinates: 33.7589°N 84.3867°W
- Construction started: 1990
- Completed: 1991
- Owner: Banyan Street Capital and funds managed by Oaktree Capital
- Operator: Banyan Street Capital

Height
- Roof: 234.70 m (770.0 ft)

Technical details
- Floor count: 50
- Floor area: 1,215,202 sq ft (112,896.0 m^{2})

Design and construction
- Architects: Philip Johnson; John Burgee; Kendall/Heaton Associates
- Developer: Hines Interests Limited Partnership

Website
- 191peachtree.com

191 Peachtree Tower is a 235 m (771 ft) 50-story skyscraper in Atlanta, Georgia. Designed by Johnson/Burgee Architects and Kendall/Heaton Associates Inc, the building was completed in 1990 and is the fourth tallest in the city, winning the BOMA Building of the Year Awards the next year, repeating in 1998 and 2003.

== Tenants and history ==
Throughout the 1990s 191 Peachtree was considered Atlanta's premier business address. However, when two of its largest tenants, law firm King & Spalding, and Wachovia moved to Midtown's new 1180 Peachtree and Atlantic Station respectively in 2006, most of the building was left vacant. That same year, Cousins Properties purchased the building from Equity Office Properties, which marked a return to 191 for the company as it helped originally develop the building. Cousins relocated their headquarters to the building, signed a number of small tenants to subdivided space and in January 2008, signed an agreement with Deloitte to extend and expand the consulting firm's current lease from 100,000 to 260,000 sq ft (9,300 to 24,200 m^{2}), bringing the building back to 87 percent occupancy. In 2023, Deloitte moved out of 191 Peachtree and by 2026, overall occupancy had dropped to 58%.

The building is located on the former site of the Majestic Hotel, which in the early 20th century was one of the city's major hotels.

== Design ==
The building was originally proposed in July 1987 at 48 floors. The building's facade is made of flame finished Rosa Dante granite and the windows are made of gray tinted glass. Each "tower" possesses a rooftop crown that is illuminated at night. The lighted double crown figured prominently in night footage filmed by helicopter during the 1996 Olympics. The primary entrance to the building is through a seven-story, 102-foot (31 m) tall atrium adjacent to Peachtree Street in Downtown Atlanta.

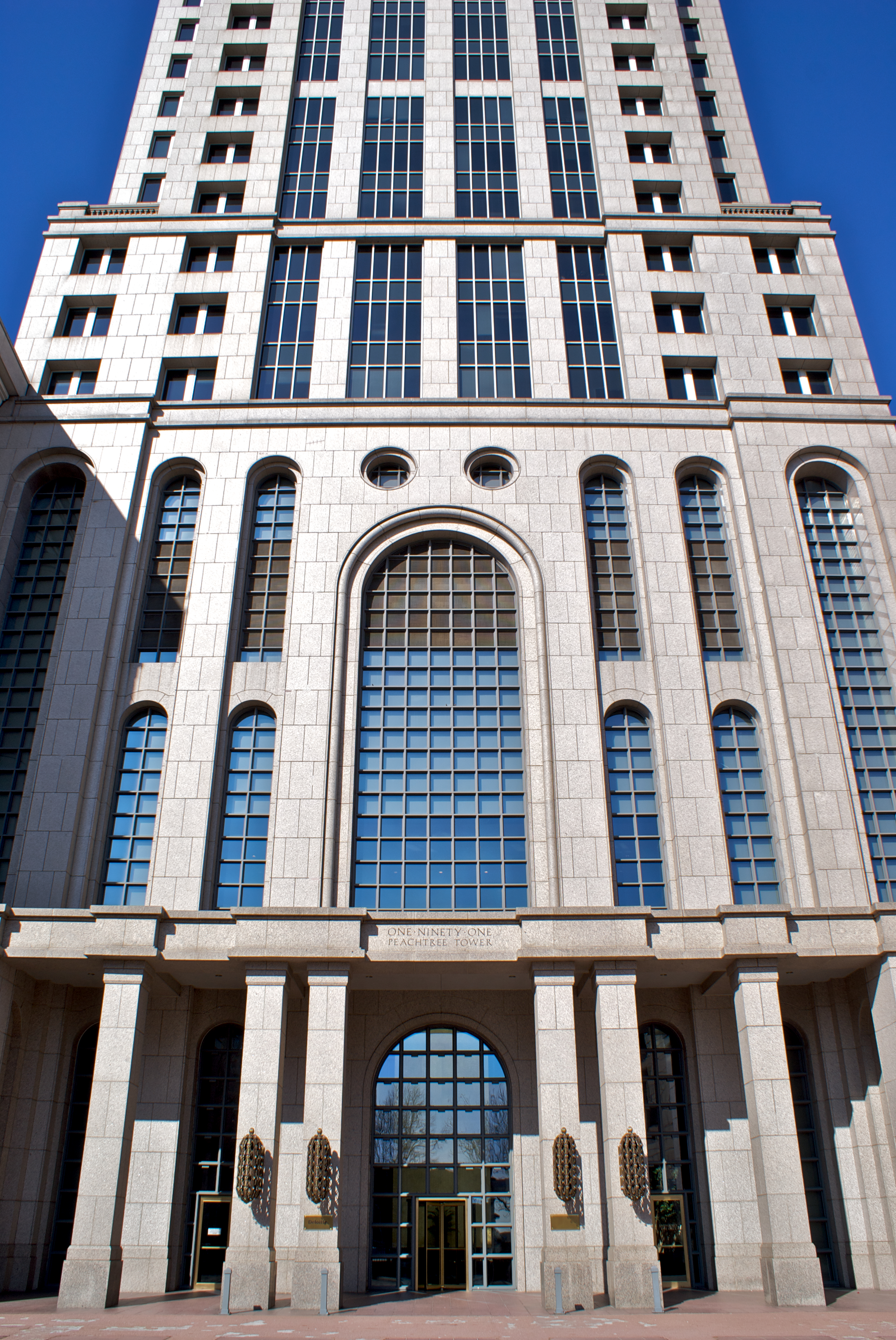
Peachtree Center Avenue Entrance

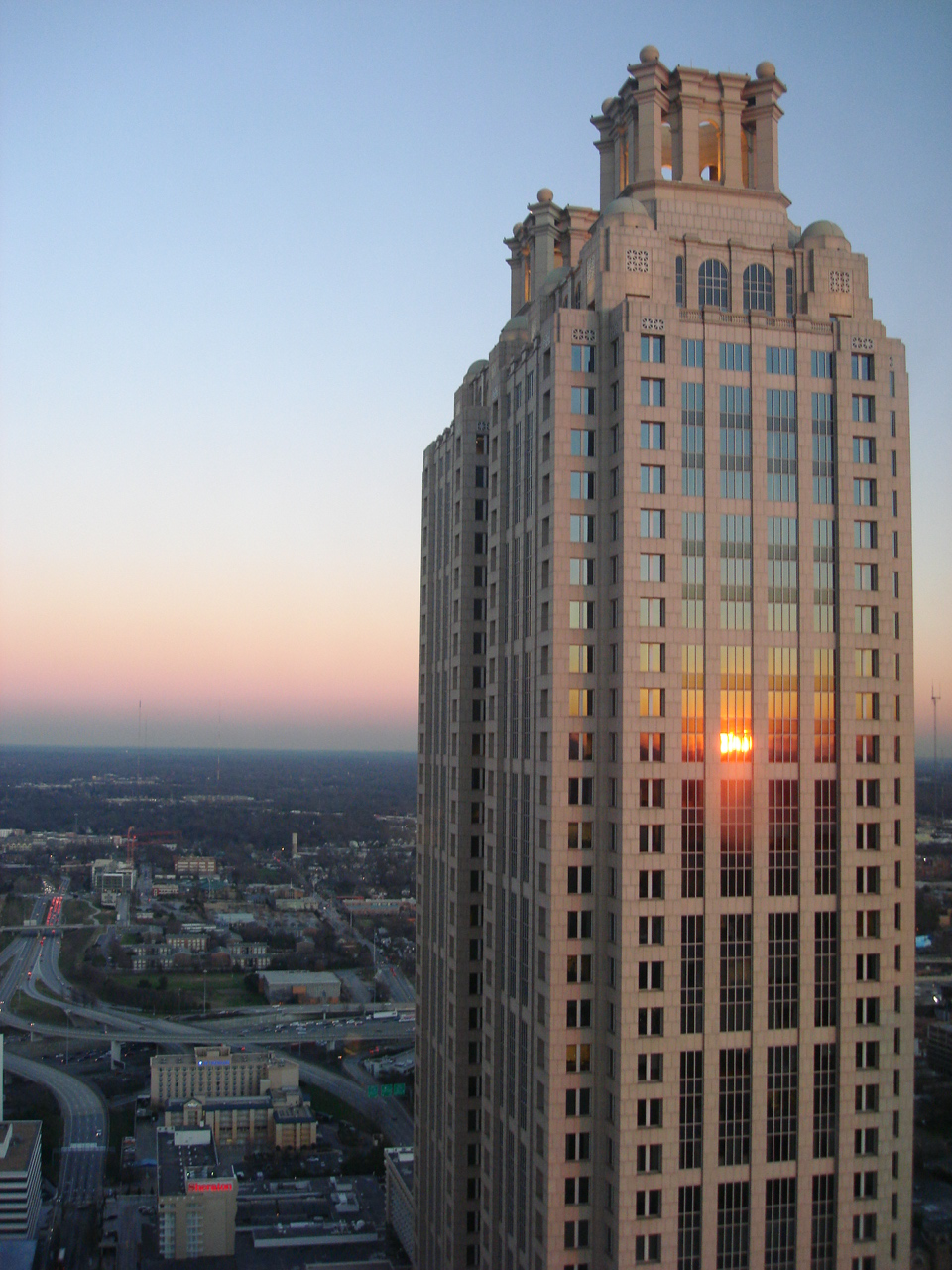
191 Peachtree Tower

== See also ==
- Architecture of Atlanta
- List of tallest buildings in Atlanta
- List of tallest buildings in the United States
