= GLG Grand =

Coordinates: 33°47′10″N 84°23′07″W

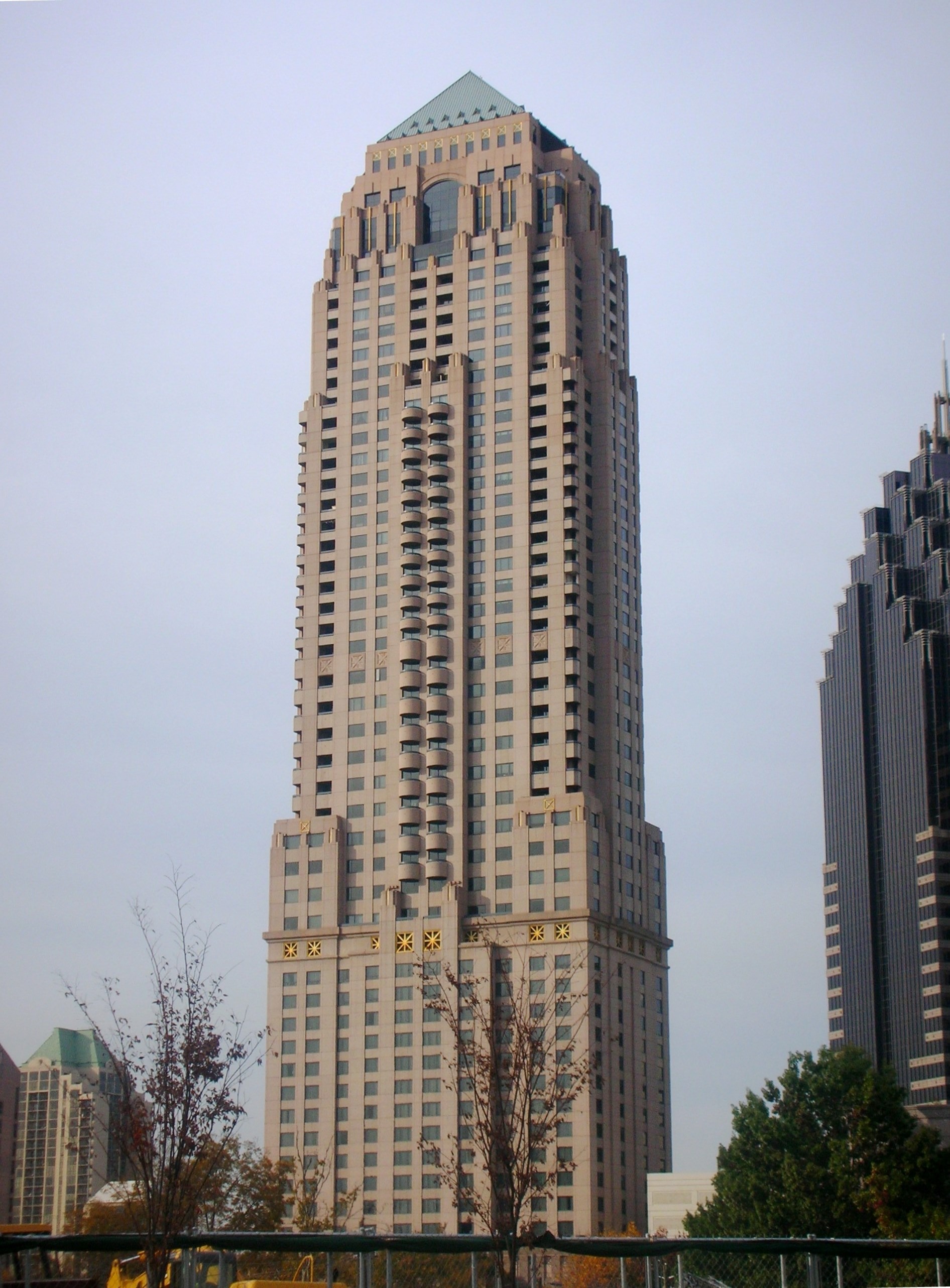
- GLG Grand in 2006
- Interactive map of the GLG Grand area

General information
- Status: Completed
- Type: Mixed-use
- Location: 75 14th Street NE
- Opening: 1992

Height
- Roof: 609 ft (186 m)

Technical details
- Floor count: 53

Design and construction
- Architects: Rabun Rasche Rector & Reece, Architects
- Main contractor: Beers Skanska, Inc.

The GLG Grand building is a 186-meter (609-foot) tall skyscraper in Midtown Atlanta. The Art Deco-inspired, pyramid-capped tower is 53 stories tall and was finished in 1992. The bottom third of it is the Four Seasons Hotel Atlanta, which includes 244 guest rooms and is the only 5-star hotel in Midtown. It is the eleventh-tallest skyscraper in Atlanta. The building was designed by Rabun Hogan Ota Rasche Architects, and built by Beers Construction of Atlanta.

The GLG Grand building is notable for several reasons. First, it was Atlanta's first mixed-use skyscraper, incorporating hotel, office and condominiums into one building. Several skyscrapers of the same type are on the drawing boards, but they have yet to break ground. Second, it was a dismal failure for its developer, G. Lars Gullstedt (1935-2015) of Sweden, who made headlines in Atlanta in 1991 by buying up huge parcels of run-down land in Midtown and proposing a massive multi-block mixed-use development to be called "GLG Park Plaza." The GLG Grand, which took its name from Gullstedt's initials, was an unrelated development of Gullstedt's on 14th Street, several blocks north. The building opened in 1992 to a depressed real estate market, and its condominiums and office space sat largely vacant. Gullstedt, who was also a developer in Sweden, was forced into bankruptcy there, and lost control of all of his Atlanta holdings including this building. Only later, in the mid-2000s, did his former Midtown parcels begin to be developed, coming just before the 2008 financial crisis.

The hotel in the building was originally called the GLG Grand Hotel, then the Occidental Grand Hotel, before becoming the Four Seasons Hotel Atlanta in the late 1990s.

== Education ==
The building is zoned to Atlanta Public Schools

- Henry W. Grady High School
- Inman Middle School
- Morningside Elementary School

== See also ==
- List of tallest buildings in Atlanta
