= 3344 Peachtree =

Skyscraper in Atlanta, Georgia

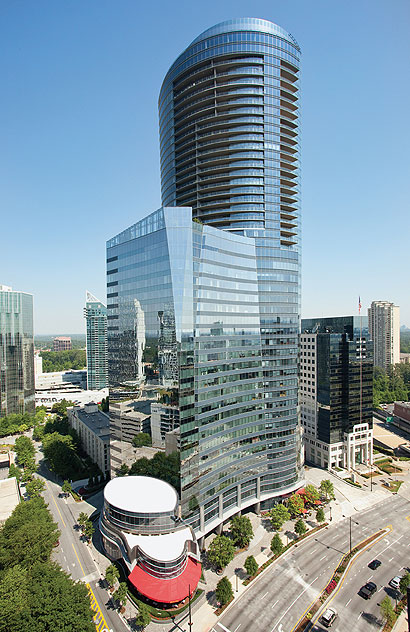
- 3344 Peachtree in 2010
- Interactive map of the 3344 Peachtree area

General information
- Status: Completed
- Classification: Mixed use
- Location: 3344 Peachtree Road
- Coordinates: 33.8471°N 84.3686°W
- Construction started: 2007
- Owner: Cousins Properties Incorporated

Height
- Roof: 635 ft (193.5 m)

Technical details
- Floor count: 50
- Floor area: 629,990 sq ft (58,528 m^{2})

Design and construction
- Architects: Smallwood, Reynolds, Stewart, Stewart
- Developer: Regent Partners
- Structural engineer: Stanley D. Lindsey & Associates, Ltd.
- Main contractor: Hardin Construction Group Inc

Website
- 3344peachtreeatl.com

3344 Peachtree is a 50-story high-rise building of 635 feet (194 m) height located in Atlanta's uptown business district of Buckhead on Peachtree Road, the northern extension of Peachtree Street. The building is a mixed-use tower that incorporates upscale dining, office space, and 82 condominia at 3344 Peachtree Road. Completed in the spring of 2008, it is the ninth tallest building in Atlanta and the tallest mixed-use building in Atlanta. It has also surpassed the Park Avenue Condominiums as the tallest building in Atlanta not to be located downtown or midtown. The building is owned by Cousins Properties of Atlanta, Georgia.

== Sovereign ==
Sovereign, the residential portion of 3344 Peachtree, will contain 82 homes between the 28th and 50th floors of the building. They will all be luxury units, with starting prices at $1 million. Artist Todd Murphy has been hired to decorate the building, including some of his own original pieces. It includes a French bistro, Bistro Niko.

== Tower Place ==
It is part of the Tower Place complex which includes the 401ft Tower Place 100, and the 451ft Buckhead Grand.

== See also ==
- List of tallest buildings in Atlanta
