= Phipps Tower =

Office tower in Buckhead, Atlanta, Georgia, U.S.

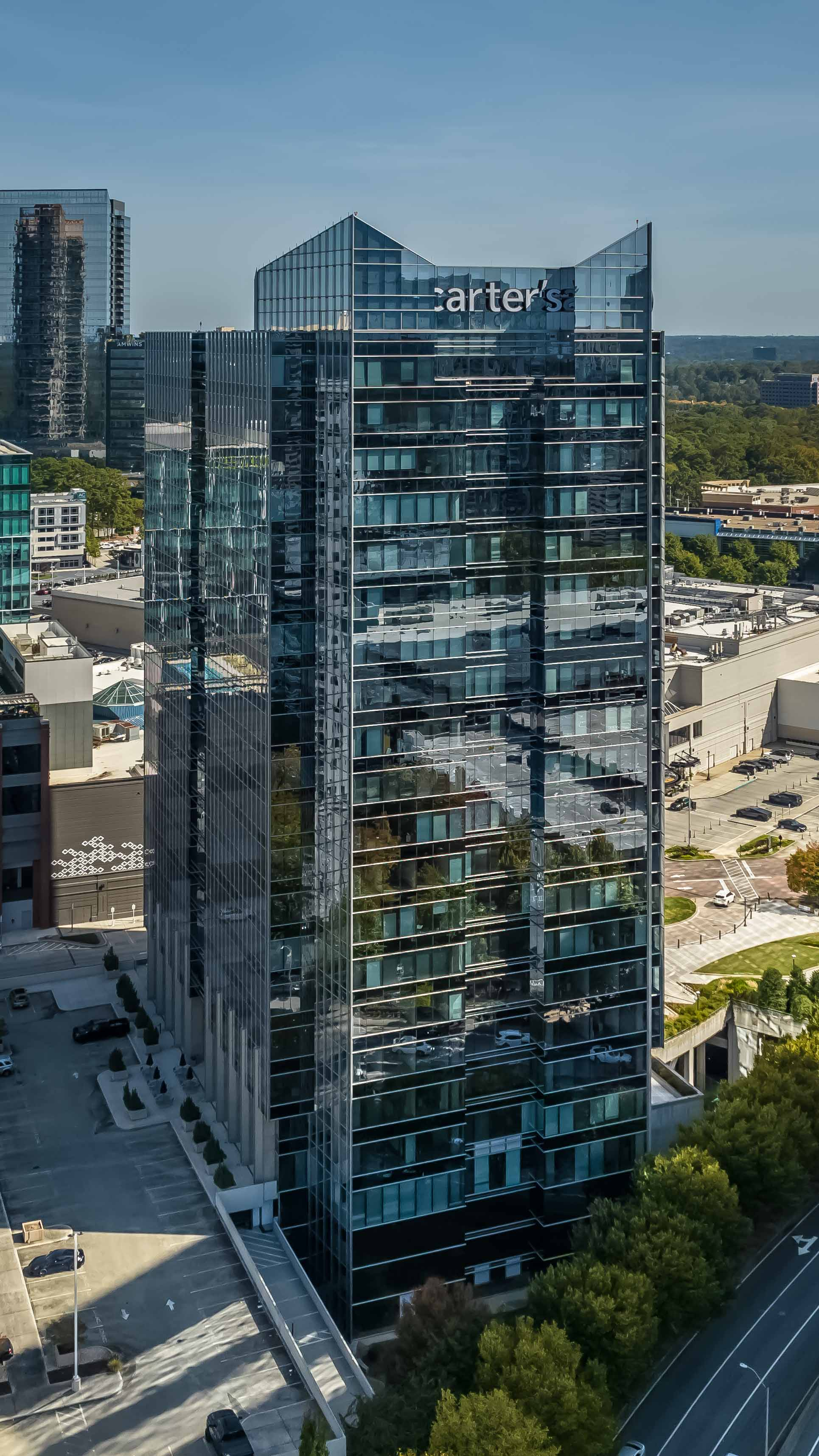
- Phipps Tower
- Interactive map of the Phipps Tower area

General information
- Status: Completed
- Type: Office tower
- Location: Buckhead, Atlanta, Georgia
- Coordinates: 33.8528°N 84.3640°W
- Completed: 2010
- Owner: John Hancock Life Insurance Company

Technical details
- Floor count: 20

Design and construction
- Architects: Manulife Financial Corp. and Crescent Resources
- Developer: Crescent Resources

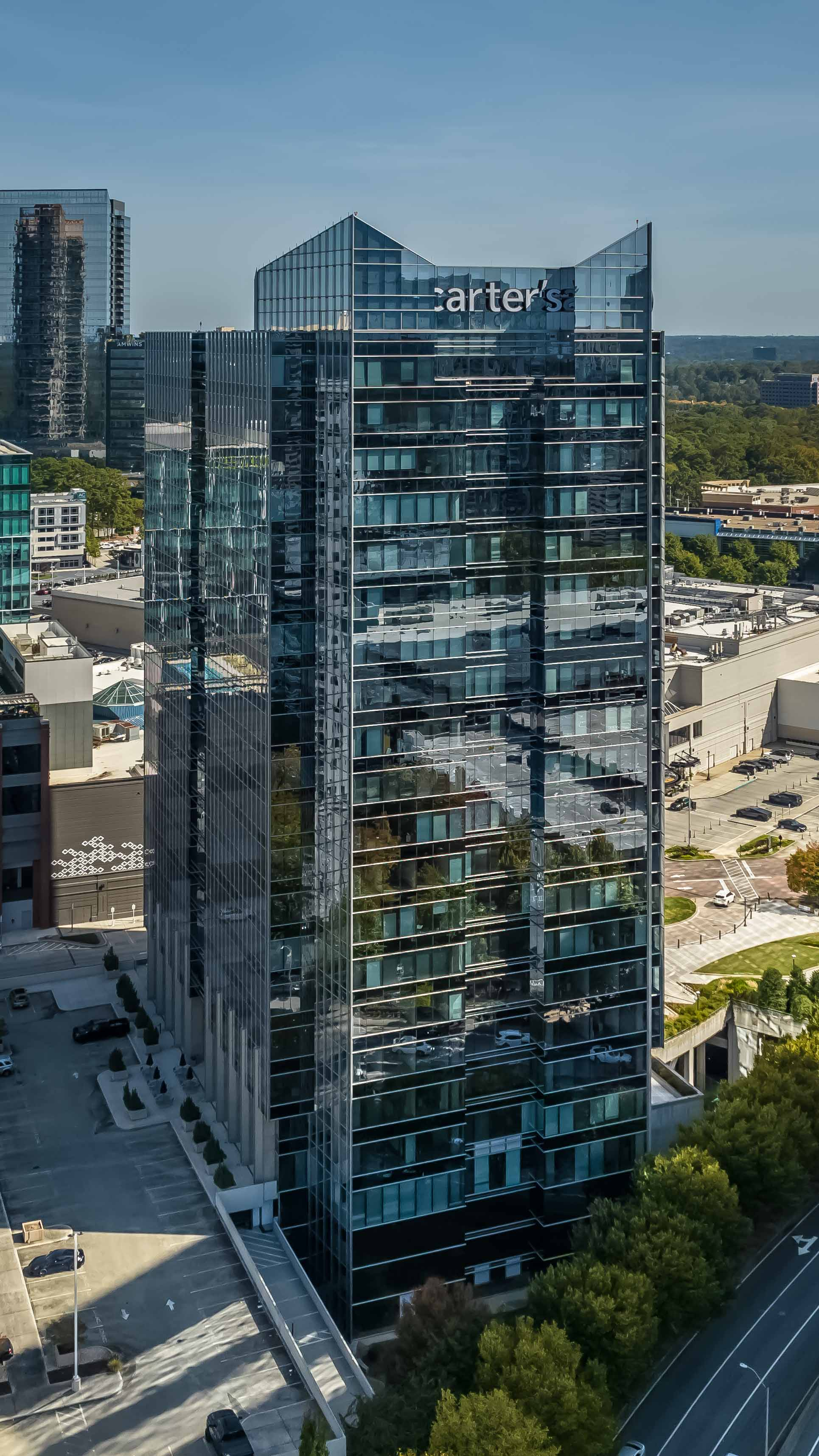
Phipps Tower

Phipps Tower is a 20-story office tower in Buckhead, Atlanta. It is adjacent to the Phipps Plaza shopping center. John Hancock Life Insurance Company owns, manages and leases the building. It is on a 2.96-acre (12,000 m^{2}) plot of land.

== History ==
In 2007, Crescent Resources announced that it wanted to construct an office tower in Buckhead possibly named Phipps Tower. Manulife Financial Corp. and Crescent Resources designed the building. The building was constructed in 2010. Douglas Sams of the Atlanta Business Chronicle. said that the announcement of plans to build the tower "raised eyebrows among Atlanta commercial real estate execs" due to concerns that there is too much office space on the market.

In March 2010 Northwestern Mutual was considering leasing space in the tower. By June of that year the company was completing a leasing deal at the tower. In June 2010, Speakeasy Inc. was the tower's sole tenant, leasing about 13,300 square feet (1,240 m^{2}), and the tower was 3% leased.

In October 2012 the Atlanta Business Chronicle reported that Carter's Inc. was likely to lease in the Phipps Tower for its headquarters. In October 2012 CoStar Group announced that its Atlanta office was moving to the Phipps Tower. It had signed a lease for 26,800 square feet (2,490 m^{2}) for 11 years.

In December 2012, Carter's Inc. announced that it was moving its headquarters from The Proscenium in Midtown Atlanta. The lease of 222,730 square feet (20,692 m^{2}) of space is one if the largest headquarters leases to have occurred to date. The estimated value if the lease, except for concessions and escalation, was $70 million.

The company consolidated its out of state jobs into the new facility, with 200 additional jobs going to Buckhead. Manulife Financial Corp owns both the Proscenium and the Phipps Tower so Carter's terminated its lease early in one building and moved to the other.

== Tenants ==
- Consulate-General of Japan, Atlanta - Suite 850 - Lease 12,870 square feet (1,196 m^{2}) of Class A office space
