= Four Seasons Hotel Atlanta =

Hotel in Georgia, United States

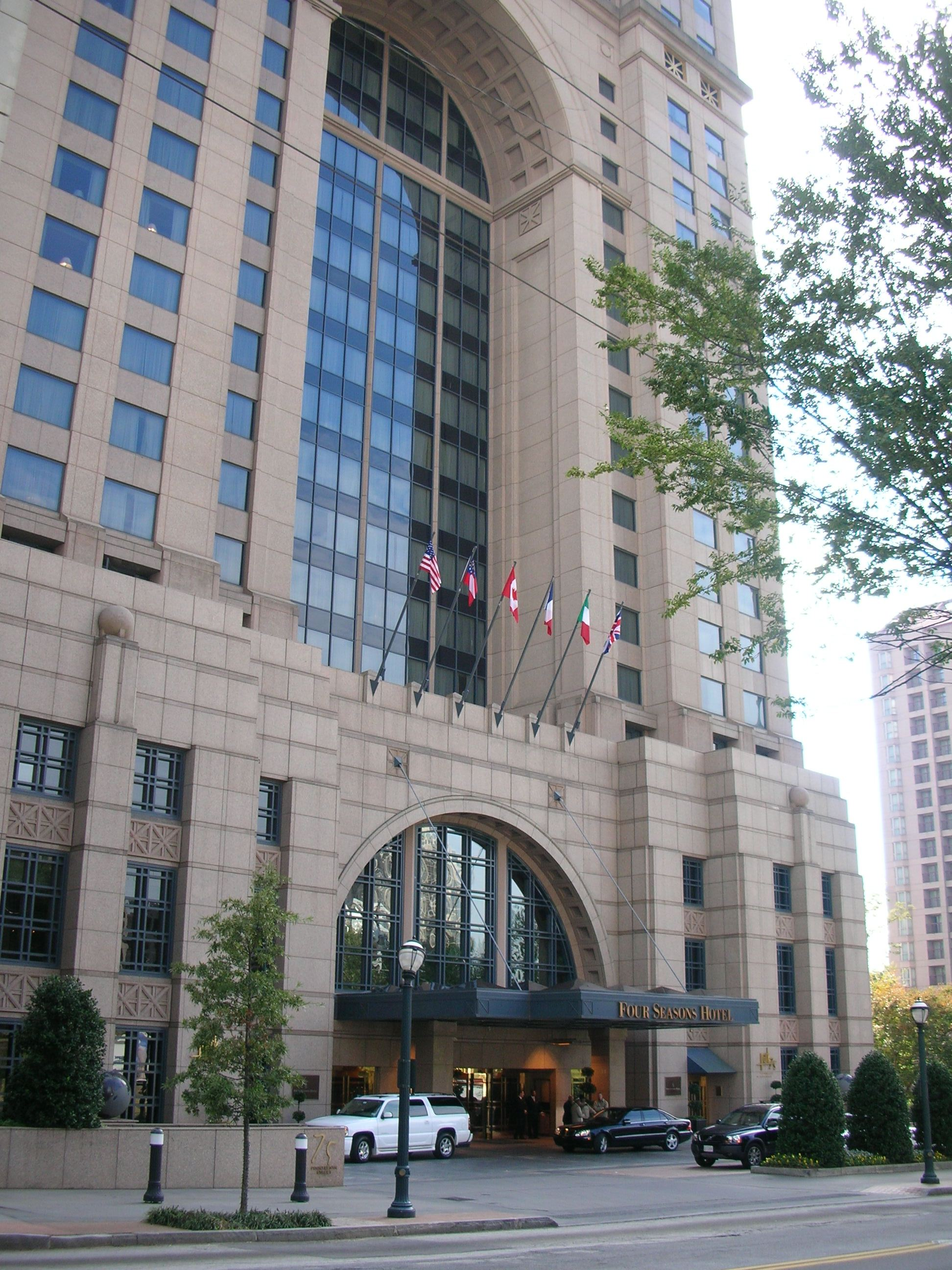
- Four Seasons Hotel Atlanta
- Interactive map of the Four Seasons Hotel Atlanta area

General information
- Location: 75 14th St NE, Atlanta, GA 30309
- Coordinates: 33.7862°N 84.3853°W
- Completed: 1992 (building)
- Opening: March 1997 (hotel)
- Management: Four Seasons Hotels and Resorts

Technical details
- Floor count: 19

Other information
- Number of rooms: 244 (including 18 suites)

Website
- Official website

Four Seasons Hotel Atlanta is a hotel in Atlanta, Georgia, United States. It is part of Toronto-based Four Seasons Hotels and Resorts. The hotel is located in the Midtown Atlanta, and occupies the lower third of the GLG Grand building.

== History ==
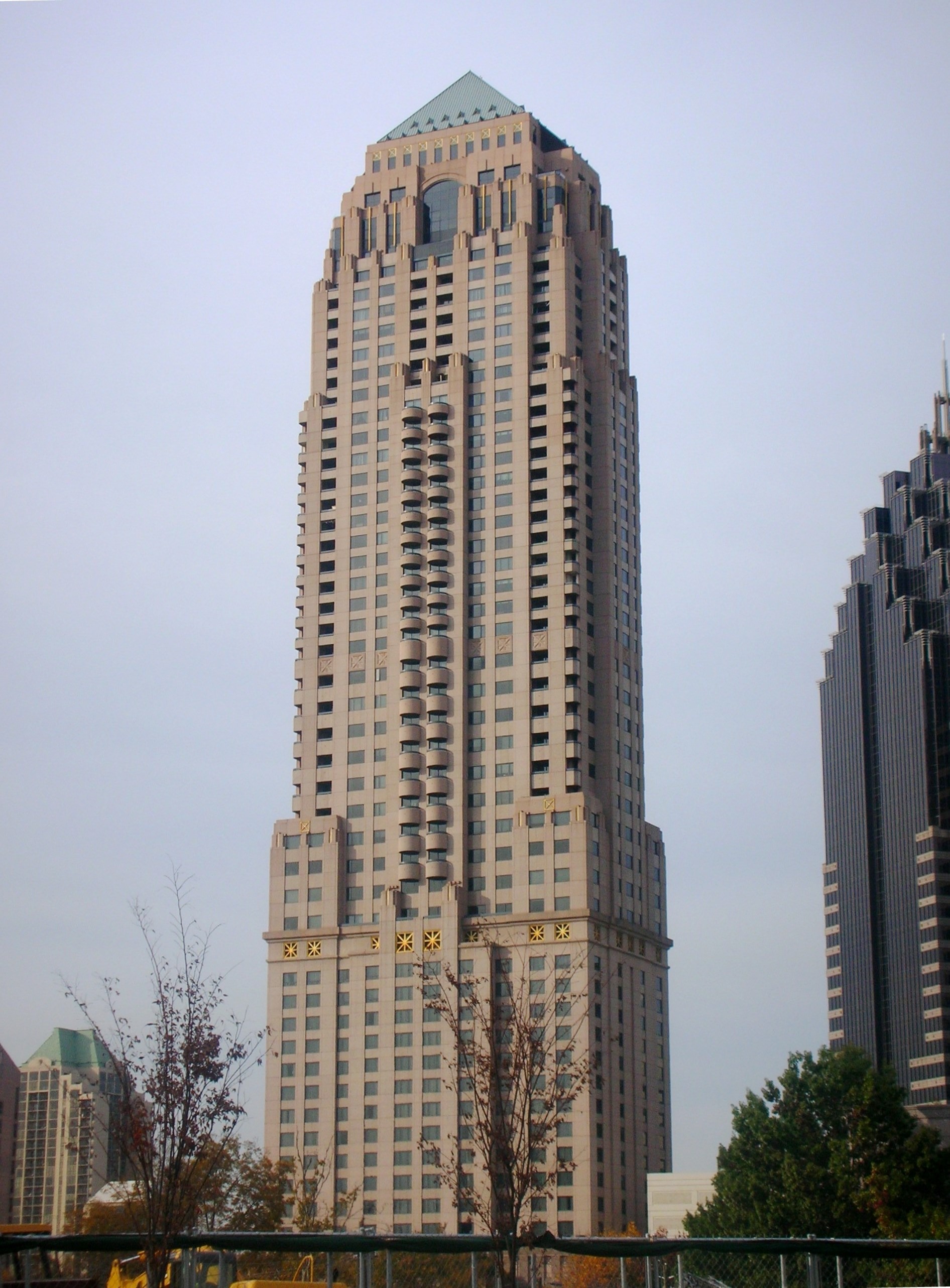
The hotel occupies the lower third of the GLG Grand building

Completed in 1992, the GLG Grand building is Atlanta's eleventh-tallest skyscraper and originally housed the GLG Grand Hotel, later the Occidental Grand. Developed by G Lars Gullstedt, a Swedish developer, the building is constructed in the Neoclassical style and has a façade of rose and marble granite designed by Atlanta's Rabun Architects. The hotel and restaurant interiors were designed by the Atlanta office of Hirsch Bedner Associates. Opened in March 1997, Four Seasons Hotel Atlanta occupies the lower 19 floors of the GLG Grand building.

The hotel had been owned by Host Hotels & Resorts since 1998, but it was sold to Bill Gates' Cascade Investment in 2013. The hotel is operated by Four Seasons Hotels and Resorts.

The 7,790 square feet (724 m^{2}) spa was opened in 2007.

Four Seasons Hotel Atlanta has been receiving the AAA Five Diamond Award since 1999. It also received a Forbes Travel Guide Five-star rating for several years, however, in 2020, it received a Four-star rating.

On October 29, 2024, a shooting occurred at Four Seasons Hotel Atlanta. Objects were thrown out of a balcony. The suspect was in custody as of November 2024.

== See also ==
- List of tallest buildings in Atlanta
- Hotels in Atlanta
