= Carter's =

American retail company

Carter's, Inc.
- Type: Public
- Traded as: NYSE: CRI; S&P 600 component
- Founded: 1865; 161 years ago (as William Carter Company) in Needham, Massachusetts, U.S.
- Founder: William Carter
- Headquarters: Atlanta, Georgia, U.S.
- Number of locations: 750 (November 2019)
- Products: Clothing
- Number of employees: 20,900 (2017)
- Subsidiaries: Little Planet; OshKosh B'gosh; Otter Avenue; Skip•Hop Inc.
- Website: carters.com

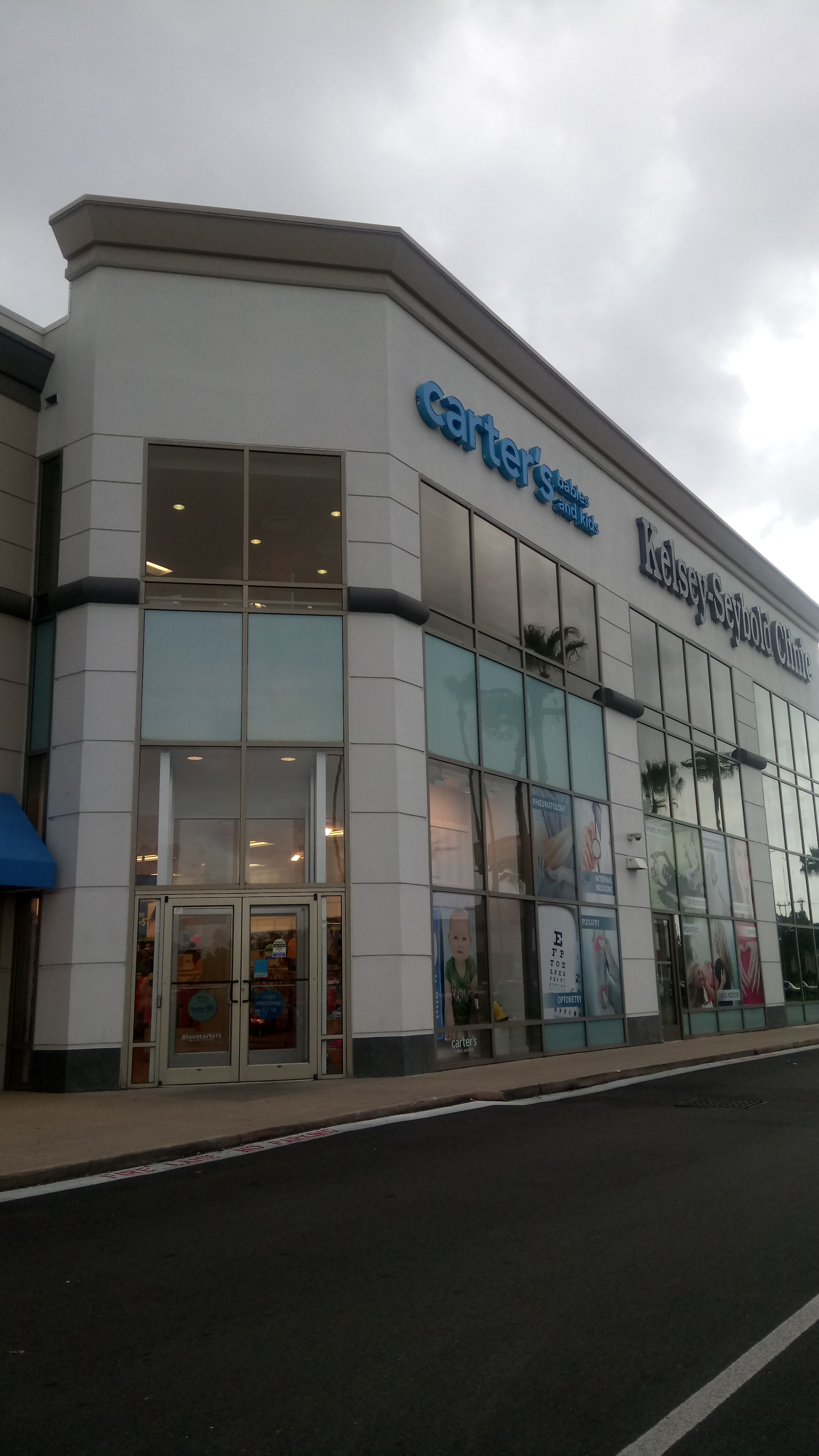
A Carter's shop in Meyerland Plaza, Houston

Carter's, Inc. is a major American designer and marketer of children's apparel. It was founded in 1865 by William Carter.

Carter's sells its products through its own Carter's and OshKosh B'gosh retail stores, its website, and in other retail outlets such as department stores. As of 2019, it was reported that Carter's accounted for around one-quarter of all sales both for the children's sleepwear market, and for clothes for the newborn to two-year-old age group. Carter's ranks 754th on the Fortune 1000 list of the largest companies in the United States.

== History ==
William Carter was the founder of William Carter Company in 1865 in Needham, Massachusetts. William Carter (1830–1918) was born in Alfreton, Derbyshire, England. He arrived in America on January 28, 1857. He married Martha Lee (1842-1873). They had four children: William Henry Carter (1864–1955), who served two terms in the U.S. House of Representatives (1915-1919) prior to being elected president of the William Carter Company in 1918; Mary Elizabeth Carter (1865-1961); John J. Carter (1867-1939); and Horace A. Carter (1869-1959). By the early 1960s, the William Carter Company manufactured at seven mills in Massachusetts and the South.

The Carter family sold the business in 1990.

In the early 2000s, Carter's reached an agreement with Target Corporation to create the "Just One You" spin-off clothing line, to be sold exclusively in Target stores. Carter's later created exclusive lines for retailers Walmart and Amazon. All of the brands sell similar articles of clothing, such as bodysuits, pajamas, and dresses, but each has its own design team and pricing policies specific to the retailer.

Carter's acquired competitor OshKosh B'gosh for $312 million in 2005.

In 2012, Carter's, Inc. announced that Braselton, Georgia would receive their 1-million-square-foot, $50 million distribution center that will support their e-commerce, retail, and wholesale businesses. The company hoped to create 1,000 jobs at the facility by 2015.

In February 2017, Carter's, Inc. acquired Skip Hop Inc., an infant and child product company based in New York, for $140 million in cash and up to $10 million in future payments contingent on reaching certain financial goals in 2017. Fireman Capital Partners, a private equity firm, had previously acquired a majority equity stake in Skip Hop Inc. for $50 million in November 2013.

In addition to selling its apparel through third-party retailers, Carter's operated 1,060 branded stores and outlets as of 2019, with plans to open up to another 100 stores in "mid-tier" shopping malls in the following years. A market research firm found that "Ninety percent of millennial parents — and 80 percent of baby boomer grandparents — have shopped at Carter's in the past year."

In April 2025, Carter's named former Vans executive Douglas Palladini as CEO and president. In May 2026, it was announced that Palladini was no longer with the company and Sharon Price John was named as new CEO and president, beginning June 16th. Prior to Carter's, John served as CEO and President of Build-A-Bear Workshop for 13 years.

== Brands ==
Carter's, Inc. markets clothing and other children's products under several brand names. Other than its namesake Carter's brand, OshKosh B'gosh, Skip Hop, Little Planet, and Otter Avenue these labels are exclusive to specific retailers and include, as of 2018:

- Exclusive to Target Corporation stores:
  - Just One You
  - Precious Firsts
  - Genuine Kids
- Exclusive to Walmart:
  - Child of Mine
- Exclusive to Amazon:
  - Simple Joys

The logo for each exclusive brand notes that it is "made by Carter's," with the exception of Genuine Kids, which carries the label "from OshKosh." Genuine Kids has been sold since 2003, before OshKosh was acquired by Carters, Inc.

== Headquarters ==
In October 2012, the Atlanta Business Chronicle reported that Carter's Inc. was likely to lease in the Phipps Tower in Buckhead for its headquarters. In December 2012, Carter's Inc. announced that it was moving its headquarters from Midtown Atlanta. The lease of 222,730 square feet (20,692 m^{2}) of space is one of the largest headquarters leases to have occurred to date in the Buckhead area of Atlanta. The estimated value of the lease, except for concessions and escalation, was $70 million. The lease in Midtown was scheduled to be terminated on December 31, 2013.

The company consolidated its out of state jobs into the new facility, with 200 additional jobs going to Buckhead. Manulife Financial Corp owns both the Proscenium and the Phipps Tower so Carter's terminated its lease early in one building and moved to the other.

The company now has its headquarters in Suite 1800 at Phipps Tower, in Buckhead, Atlanta.
