= Tvsdesign =

American architecture firm located in Atlanta, Georgia

TVS
- Company type: Employee Stock Ownership Plan (ESOP)
- Industry: Architecture
- Founded: 1968
- Founders: Bill Thompson, Tom Ventulett and Ray Stainback
- Headquarters: Atlanta, United States
- Area served: Worldwide
- Key people: Janet Simpson, President
- Services: Architecture, Interior design, Sustainable Design and Urban Design
- Revenue: $38 Million USD
- Number of employees: 175
- Website: tvsdesign.com

TVS is an architecture, planning, and interior design firm in Atlanta.

== History ==
Founded in 1968 by Bill Thompson, Tom Ventulett, and Ray Stainback, tvsdesign has designed several notable buildings in greater Atlanta and beyond throughout the years, including the Omni Coliseum and Complex, the Georgia Dome, the AT&T Promenade buildings, the CNN Center, the Concourse at Landmark Center in Sandy Springs, the Georgia Aquarium, the Georgia World Congress Center buildings, and the Mercedes-Benz Stadium.

Also running offices in Chicago, Dubai and Shanghai, tvsdesign has designed several prominent buildings outside of Atlanta as well, including the Washington DC Convention Center, the Nanjing International Expo Center, the Pennsylvania Convention Center in Philadelphia, and the Vision Tower in Dubai.

In 2016, the firm named Janet Simpson its third president and first female president.

== Notable projects ==
Project	Location	Completed	Principal architects	Notes
Omni Coliseum	Atlanta, Georgia	1972		
Omni Complex	Atlanta, Georgia	1976		
Promenade II	Atlanta, Georgia	1990	Foster Lynn	
Concourse at Landmark Center	Sandy Springs, Georgia	1991		
Georgia Dome	Atlanta, Georgia	1992		
The Proscenium	Atlanta, Georgia	2001		
Georgia World Congress Center	Atlanta, Georgia	1976, 1985, 1992, and 2002		
Washington DC Convention Center	Washington, D.C.	2003		
Technology Square	Atlanta, Georgia	2003		
InterContinental Buckhead	Atlanta, Georgia	2004		
Atlantic Station	Atlanta, Georgia	2005		Master plan
Georgia Aquarium	Atlanta, Georgia	2005		
McCormick Place	Chicago, Illinois	1997 and 2007	Andrew McLean	
Dubai Towers Dubai	Dubai, U.A.E.		Jay Thomson; Kevin Gordon	Planned but never built.
Cairo Festival City	Cairo, Egypt	2008		
The Arjaan by Rotana	Dubai, U.A.E.	2008	David Brown	
Nanjing International Expo Center	Nanjing, China	2008		
Ocean Center	Daytona Beach, Florida	2009	Andrew McLean; Kevin Gordon	
Port of Spain International Waterfront Centre	Port of Spain, Trinidad and Tobago	2009		
Sykes Chapel	Tampa, Florida	2009	Bob Balke; Steven Clem	
271 17th Street	Atlanta, Georgia	2009		
Duke Energy Center	Charlotte, North Carolina	2010	David Brown	
Pennsylvania Convention Center	Philadelphia, Pennsylvania	2011		
Vision Tower	Dubai, U.A.E.	2011	Jay Thomson	
Galaxy Mall	Tianjin, China	2013	Mark Carter; Donna Childs	
Music City Center	Nashville, Tennessee	2013	Kevin Gordon	
Washington Marriott Marquis	Washington, D.C.	2014		
College Football Hall of Fame	Atlanta, Georgia	2014	Kevin Gordon	
Cobo Center	Detroit, Michigan	2014	Andy McLean; Jay Thomson	Renovation including the COBO Arena
Mercedes-Benz Stadium	Atlanta, Georgia	2017	Mark Carter	
Children's Healthcare of Atlanta Training Ground	Atlanta, Georgia	2017	Mark Carter; Donna Childs; Rob O'Keefe	
Mattress Firm Headquarters	Houston, Texas	2016	Janet Simpson	

== Awards ==
- In 2002, Tvsdesign was awarded the Architecture Firm Award by the American Institute of Architects, which is given only once each year and recognizes the design work of an entire firm.
- Urban Land Institute 2012 Global Awards for Excellence for the Levine Center for the Arts in Charlotte, NC.
