= One Atlantic Center =

Skyscraper in Atlanta, Georgia, US

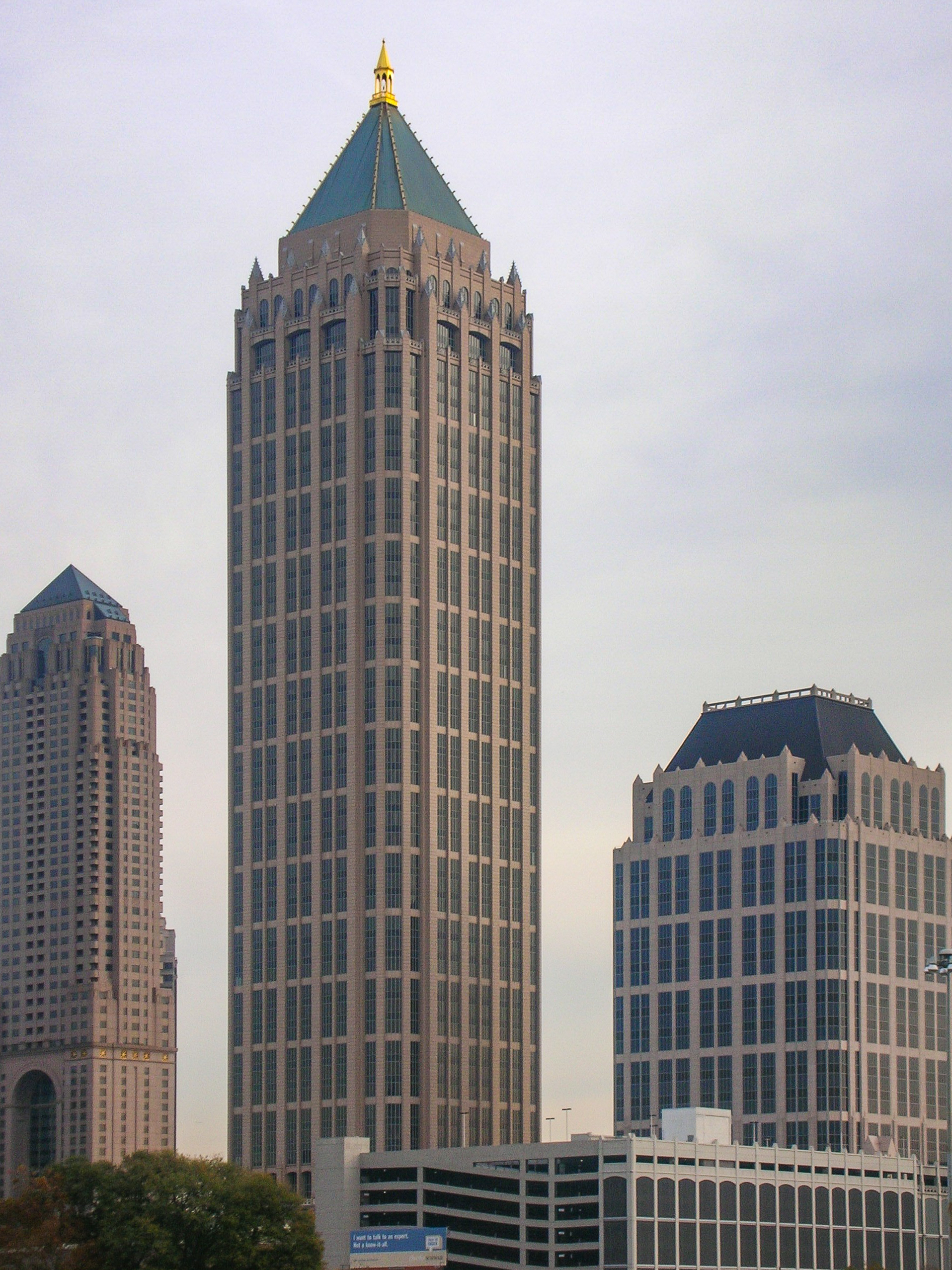
- One Atlantic Center in 2006

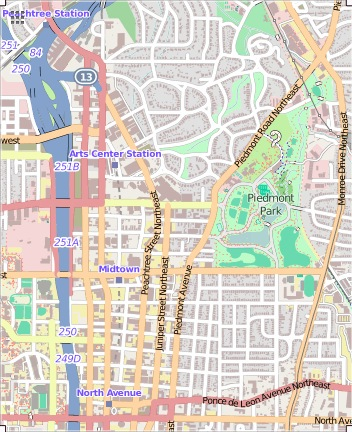
- Location within Atlanta Midtown
- Alternative names: IBM Tower

General information
- Type: Commercial offices
- Location: 1201 West Peachtree Street; Atlanta
- Coordinates: 33.786944°N 84.387222°W
- Construction started: 1986
- Completed: 1987
- Owner: AC Property Owner LP
- Operator: AC Property Owner LP

Height
- Roof: 250 m (820 ft)

Technical details
- Floor count: 50
- Floor area: 1,098,705 sq ft (102,073.0 m^{2})
- Lifts/elevators: 24

Design and construction
- Architects: Johnson/Burgee Architects; Heery International, Inc.
- Developer: Prentiss Properties
- Main contractor: The Beck Group

Website
- 1ac.com

One Atlantic Center, also known as IBM Tower, is a skyscraper located in Midtown Atlanta, Georgia. It is the third tallest building in Atlanta.

== History ==
It is the third-tallest in Atlanta, reaching a height of 820 feet (250 m) with 50 stories of office space with a total building area of 1,187,676 sq.ft. When the slender concrete core was completed in October 1986, it was the tallest slipformed skyscraper in the country. It was completed in 1987 and remained the tallest building in Atlanta until 1992, when it was surpassed by the Bank of America Plaza, which was built on the northern edge of Downtown adjacent to Midtown. It was also the tallest building in the southeastern U.S. at the time of completion, surpassing the Southeast Financial Center in Miami. In the 1990s, IBM, along with other large corporations, changed financial focus to leverage assets and decrease real estate holdings. IBM sold this property, along with others.

== Architecture ==
The building was commissioned by Prentiss Properties as a southeastern headquarters for IBM, a company responsible for many notable skyscrapers of the 1980s. A local and well known engineer, Blake Van Leer, was the lead engineer for the project. Van Leer worked on most of the major skyline projects in the area during the 70s and 80s. Aside from introducing Atlanta to the postmodern architectural idiom of the 80s, this tower is notable for essentially creating what is now the Midtown commercial district. Located at the then-remote corner of 14th and West Peachtree Street over a mile from Downtown, this building nevertheless opened nearly fully occupied and thus attracted developers to Midtown.

The design of the building was influenced by the Tribune Tower in Chicago, which is most evident in the base of the building as well as the main body. The building's exterior is clad in pink Spanish granite and culminates in a copper pyramidal top with a gold peak. The design includes gothic flourishes, most noticeably below the copper top of the building. At night the peak and ridges along the top are illuminated brightly, creating a glowing effect.

== Other phases ==
It was joined in 2001 by the much shorter Regions Plaza building (formerly known as the Atlantic Center Plaza), which bears similar postmodern design and was constructed across the street as the second phase of the Atlantic Center development. Regions Plaza's design and architecture are so similar to the One Atlantic Center that it has affectionately become known in Atlanta as the "Mini Me" building, named after the comical dwarfish clone of Dr. Evil in the Austin Powers movies.

== Development ==
One Atlantic Center was designed by Johnson/Burgee Architects. As associate architect, Heery International, Inc. produced the contract documents. Both Atlantic Center Towers were constructed by HCBeck, now known as The Beck Group.

== Major tenants ==
- Alston & Bird
- RSM Global
- Carlton Fields
- Bryan Cave
- DLA Piper
- Duff & Phelps
- Korn Ferry International
- Equifax
- JAMS
- FTI Consulting
- KPMG

== See also ==
- List of tallest buildings in Atlanta
- List of tallest buildings in the United States
