= 1180 Peachtree =

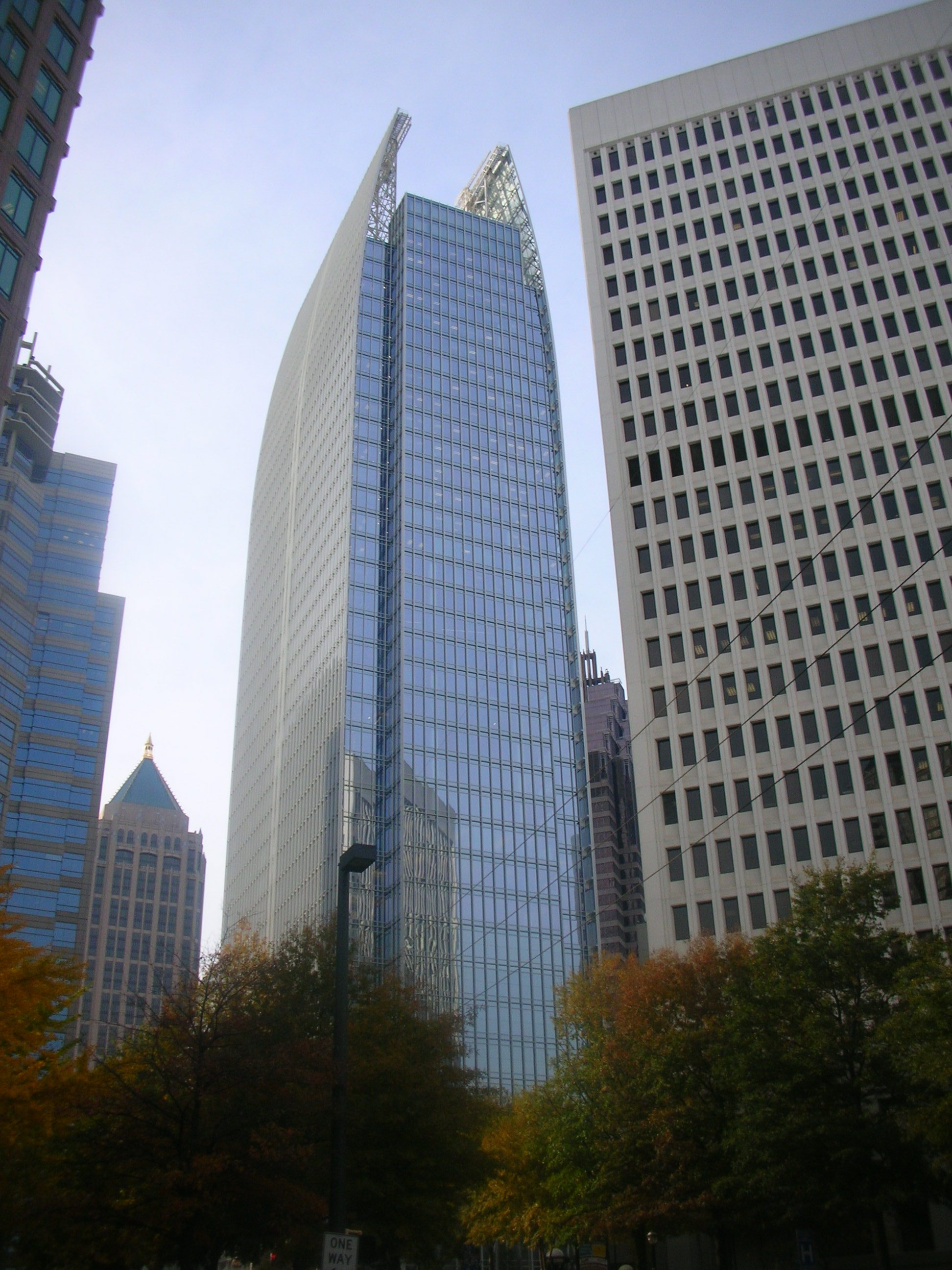
- 1180 Peachtree in 2006

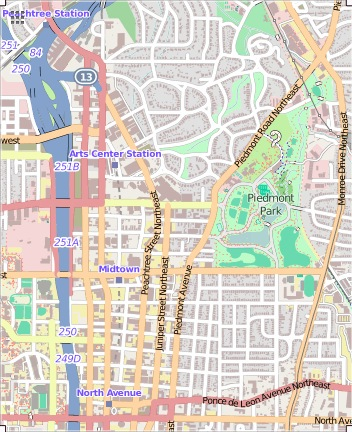
- Location within Atlanta Midtown Location within Atlanta Location within Georgia Location within the United States

General information
- Status: Completed
- Type: Mixed Use
- Location: 1180 Peachtree Street; Atlanta, Georgia
- Coordinates: 33.7868288°N 84.383892°W
- Opening: 2006

Height
- Roof: 657 ft (200 m)

Technical details
- Floor count: 41
- Floor area: 624,996 sq ft (58,064.0 m^{2})

Design and construction
- Architects: Pickard Chilton, Architect; Kendall/Heaton Associates Inc., Associate Architect-Architect of Record
- Structural engineer: Thornton Tomasetti
- Main contractor: Turner Construction Company

Website
- www.1180peachtree.com

1180 Peachtree, commonly known as the Symphony Tower, is a 41-story skyscraper located at 1180 Peachtree Street in the Midtown district of Atlanta, Georgia, United States. Rising to a height of approximately 657 feet (200 m), the building includes office and retail space in its 624,996 sq ft (58,064 m^{2}) of floor area as well as a 1,200 space parking deck. Construction was completed in 2006.

Designed by architectural firm Pickard Chilton of Connecticut, 1180 Peachtree incorporates various environmental innovations that achieved the prestigious U.S. Green Building Council's Leadership in Energy and Environmental Design (LEED) gold certification. This building is marked on the skyline by two sweeping glass fins extending upwards from the north and south walls. These fins are illuminated from inside at night for a dramatic skyline presence, giving what is considered to be a Gothic feel.

Kendall/Heaton Associates, Inc., Houston, TX served as the Architect of Record for 1180 Peachtree. Turner Construction was the construction manager for the project.

Over 60% of the tower's leasable space is occupied by Atlanta-based law firm King & Spalding as its international headquarters. The firm was previously located in downtown's 191 Peachtree Tower.

The building was intended as part of the Woodruff Arts Center's proposed Atlanta Symphony Center, which had been designed by Spanish architect Santiago Calatrava and was planned for land adjacent to the structure along 14th Street. The $300 million Symphony Center could not begin construction until fundraising goals were met, but fundraising stalled at $114 million. The Atlanta Symphony cancelled the Calatrava project in 2009.

== References in popular culture ==
- The building is featured in detail in the 2009 Channel 4 series Vertical City (series 1, episode 11).

== See also ==
- List of tallest buildings in Atlanta
