= National Register of Historic Places listings in Fulton County, Georgia =

This is a list of properties and districts in Fulton County, Georgia that are listed on the National Register of Historic Places (NRHP). It covers most of the NRHP properties in Atlanta; other Atlanta listings are covered in National Register of Historic Places listings in DeKalb County, Georgia.

This National Park Service list is complete through NPS recent listings posted November 6, 2026.

== Current listings ==
	Name on the Register	Image	Date listed	Location	City or town	Description
1	61 16th Street Apartment Building	61 16th Street Apartment Building	August 30, 2006 (#06000732)	61 16th St. 33°47′34″N 84°23′03″W	Atlanta	
2	63 Mangum Street Industrial Building	63 Mangum Street Industrial Building	June 28, 1996 (#96000696)	63–69 Mangum St. and 398–400 Markham St. 33°45′09″N 84°24′01″W	Atlanta	
3	696 Peachtree Street Apartments	696 Peachtree Street Apartments	May 8, 2013 (#13000240)	826 Peachtree St. 33°46′39″N 84°23′04″W	Atlanta	
4	705 Piedmont Avenue Apartments	705 Piedmont Avenue Apartments	December 19, 1991 (#91001853)	705 Piedmont Ave. 33°46′25″N 84°22′52″W	Atlanta	Designed by architect Russell Conklin in 1924.
5	Academy of Medicine	Academy of Medicine	April 30, 1980 (#80001070)	875 W. Peachtree St., NE. 33°46′45″N 84°23′13″W	Atlanta	
6	Adair Park Historic District	Adair Park Historic District	June 2, 2000 (#00000563)	Bounded by Metropolitan Parkway, Lexington Ave., Norfolk Southern RR and Shelton Ave. 33°43′52″N 84°24′34″W	Atlanta	
7	Charles R. Adams Park	Charles R. Adams Park	January 14, 2013 (#12001167)	1690 Delowe Dr. 33°42′37″N 84°27′48″W	Atlanta	Boundary increase approved April 12, 2021.
8	Jack and Helen Adams Lustron House	Jack and Helen Adams Lustron House	March 18, 1996 (#96000212)	832 Burchill St., SW. 33°42′44″N 84°24′57″W	Atlanta	A Lustron house
9	Alberta Drive-Mathieson Drive-West Shadowlawn Avenue Historic District		January 27, 2015 (#14001208)	Roughly centered on W. Shadowlawn Ave., Alberta & Mathieson Drs., NE. 33°50′42″N 84°22′36″W	Atlanta	
10	Cecil and Hermione Alexander House		March 25, 2010 (#10000116)	2232 Mt. Paran Rd, N.W. 33°51′23″N 84°26′15″W	Atlanta	
11	Ansley Park Historic District	Ansley Park Historic District	April 20, 1979 (#79000717)	Roughly bounded by RR tracks, Beverly Rd., Piedmont Ave., Spring, 15th & Peachtree Sts. 33°47′34″N 84°22′45″W	Atlanta	
12	Apartments at 2 Collier Road	Apartments at 2 Collier Road	September 10, 2007 (#07000937)	2 Collier Rd. 33°48′31″N 84°23′39″W	Atlanta	
13	Apartments at 22–24 Collier Road	Apartments at 22–24 Collier Road	September 10, 2007 (#07000938)	22–24 Collier Rd. 33°48′32″N 84°23′42″W	Atlanta	
14	Thomas P. Arnold House	Thomas P. Arnold House	May 10, 1984 (#84001074)	518 S. Main St. 33°30′40″N 84°40′18″W	Palmetto	
15	Ashby Street Car Barn	Ashby Street Car Barn	August 6, 1998 (#98000972)	981 Ashby St. NW. 33°47′02″N 84°25′01″W	Atlanta	
16	Atkins Park District	Atkins Park District	August 30, 1982 (#82004619)	St. Augustine St., St. Charles, and St. Louis Pls. between N. Highland Ave. and Briarcliff Rd. 33°46′31″N 84°21′01″W	Atlanta	
17	Atlanta Biltmore Hotel and Biltmore Apartments	Atlanta Biltmore Hotel and Biltmore Apartments	January 20, 1980 (#80001071)	817 W. Peachtree St. 33°46′36″N 84°23′11″W	Atlanta	
18	Atlanta Buggy Company and Warehouse-Hatcher Bros. Furniture Company	Atlanta Buggy Company and Warehouse-Hatcher Bros. Furniture Company	August 21, 1992 (#92001070)	530–544 Means St. 33°46′21″N 84°24′20″W	Atlanta	
19	Atlanta City Hall	Atlanta City Hall	July 13, 1983 (#83000227)	68 Mitchell St. SW. 33°44′56″N 84°23′25″W	Atlanta	
20	Atlanta Constitution Building	Atlanta Constitution Building	January 21, 2026 (#100012592)	143 Alabama Street SW; 33°45′15″N 84°23′34″W	Atlanta	
21	Atlanta Spring and Bed Company-Block Candy Company	Atlanta Spring and Bed Company-Block Candy Company	July 28, 1995 (#95000910)	512 Means St. 33°46′20″N 84°24′19″W	Atlanta	
22	Atlanta Stockade	Atlanta Stockade	June 25, 1987 (#87000948)	760 Glenwood Ave. 33°44′30″N 84°21′44″W	Atlanta	
23	Atlanta University Center District	Atlanta University Center District	July 12, 1976 (#76000621)	Roughly bounded by transit right-of-way, Northside Dr., Walnut, Fair, Roach, W. End Dr., Euralee and Chestnut Sts. 33°45′00″N 84°24′33″W	Atlanta	
24	Atlanta Waterworks Hemphill Avenue Station	Atlanta Waterworks Hemphill Avenue Station	March 29, 1978 (#78000982)	1210 Hemphill Ave., NW. 33°47′14″N 84°24′30″W	Atlanta	
25	Atlanta Women's Club	Atlanta Women's Club	January 31, 1979 (#79000718)	1150 Peachtree St., NE. 33°47′09″N 84°22′59″W	Atlanta	
26	Baltimore Block	Baltimore Block	June 3, 1976 (#76000622)	5,7,9,11,13,15,17,19 Baltimore Pl. 33°46′06″N 84°23′16″W	Atlanta	
27	Barrington Hall	Barrington Hall	December 9, 1971 (#71000275)	60 Marietta St. 34°00′47″N 84°21′50″W	Roswell	
28	Bass Furniture Building	Bass Furniture Building	January 8, 1979 (#79000719)	142–150 Mitchell St. 33°45′07″N 84°23′32″W	Atlanta	
29	John F. Beavers House	John F. Beavers House	March 29, 1984 (#84001075)	Northwest of Fairburn off GA 92; 33°39′14″N 84°40′16″W	Fairburn	
30	Berkeley Park Historic District	Berkeley Park Historic District	June 23, 2003 (#03000536)	Roughly bounded by Bellemeade Rd., Northside Dr., Atlanta Waterworks and Howell Mill Rd. 33°48′00″N 84°24′47″W	Atlanta	
31	Bolton Lodge No. 416		April 2, 2025 (#100011607)	2324 Marietta Road Northwest; 33°49′08″N 84°27′44″W	Atlanta	
32	Dr. Brailsford R. Brazeal House		April 8, 2005 (#05000278)	193 Joseph E. Lowery Boulevard; 33°45′03″N 84°25′05″W	Atlanta	
33	Briarcliff Hotel	Briarcliff Hotel	September 9, 1982 (#82002415)	1050 Ponce de Leon Ave. 33°46′26″N 84°21′11″W	Atlanta	
34	Briarcliff Plaza	Briarcliff Plaza	April 20, 2020 (#100005182)	1027 and 1061 Ponce de Leon Ave. NE; 33°46′26″N 84°21′10″W	Atlanta	
35	Brookhaven Historic District	Brookhaven Historic District	January 24, 1986 (#86000134)	East of Peachtree-Dunwoody and north and east of Peachtree Rds. 33°51′49″N 84°21′02″W	Atlanta	
36	Brookwood Hills Historic District	Brookwood Hills Historic District	December 21, 1979 (#79003776)	Off U.S. 19 and GA 9; 33°48′21″N 84°23′23″W	Atlanta	
37	Building at 161 Spring St.	Building at 161 Spring St.	June 14, 2001 (#01000644)	161 Spring St., NW. 33°45′37″N 84°23′23″W	Atlanta	This portion of Spring St. was renamed to Ted Turner Dr.
38	Building at 220 Sunset Avenue, NW		January 7, 2026 (#100012511)	220 Sunset Avenue, NW; 33°45′39″N 84°24′36″W	Atlanta	
39	Building at 760–768 Confederate Avenue		October 2, 2018 (#100003037)	760 Confederate Avenue SE. 33°44′01″N 84°21′54″W	Atlanta	Confederate Avenue was renamed to United Avenue
40	Buildings at 523-549 Stewart Avenue		October 31, 2023 (#100009517)	565 Northside Dr SW, 523 to 529 Metropolitan Parkway, 523 Stewart Avenue, 35 Stewart Avenue; 33°44′24″N 84°24′30″W	Atlanta	
41	Bulloch Hall	Bulloch Hall	May 27, 1971 (#71000276)	Bulloch Ave. 34°00′55″N 84°22′04″W	Roswell	
42	Burns Cottage	Burns Cottage	December 1, 1983 (#83003572)	988 Alloway Pl., SE. 33°43′37″N 84°21′20″W	Atlanta	
43	Butler Street Colored Methodist Episcopal Church	Butler Street Colored Methodist Episcopal Church	May 9, 1983 (#83000228)	23 Butler St., SE. 33°45′13″N 84°22′51″W	Atlanta	
44	Cabbagetown District	Cabbagetown District	January 1, 1976 (#76000623)	Bounded by Boulevard, Pearl St., Memorial Dr., and railroad tracks 33°44′59″N 84°21′59″W	Atlanta	
45	Campbell County Courthouse	Campbell County Courthouse	March 26, 1976 (#76000634)	E. Broad and Cole Sts. 33°34′00″N 84°34′46″W	Fairburn	Courthouse for the defunct Campbell County, Georgia
46	Candler Building	Candler Building	August 24, 1977 (#77000424)	127 Peachtree St., NE. 33°45′25″N 84°23′16″W	Atlanta	
47	Canton Apartments	Canton Apartments	December 8, 1980 (#80004456)	2846–2840 Peachtree Rd. 33°49′57″N 84°23′04″W	Atlanta	
48	Capital City Club	Capital City Club	September 15, 1977 (#77000425)	7 Harris St., NW. 33°45′39″N 84°23′16″W	Atlanta	
49	Capitol View Apartments		November 13, 2023 (#100009520)	1191 Metropolitan Parkway; 33°43′21″N 84°24′29″W	Atlanta	
50	Capitol View Historic District		April 22, 2016 (#16000195)	Roughly bounded by Hartford Pl., Fairbanks St., Perkerson Park, Sylvan Rd., and Division Pl. 33°42′59″N 84°25′01″W	Atlanta	
51	Capitol View Manor Historic District	Capitol View Manor Historic District	December 3, 2013 (#13000876)	Roughly bounded by Norfolk Southern RR, Hillside Dr., SW., I-75, Deckner Ave., SW. & Metropolitan Pkwy., SW. 33°43′03″N 84°24′21″W	Atlanta	
52	Cascade Heights Commercial Historic District		November 23, 2020 (#100005817)	Centered on the jct. of Cascade Rd. SW and Benjamin E. Hayes Dr. SW; 33°43′21″N 84°27′49″W	Atlanta	
53	Castleberry Hill Historic District	Castleberry Hill Historic District	August 8, 1985 (#85001742)	Roughly bounded by Nelson St., Southern & Central of Georgia RR, McDaniel, Peters & Walker Sts. 33°44′52″N 84°24′03″W	Atlanta	
54	Central Presbyterian Church	Central Presbyterian Church	March 13, 1986 (#86000366)	201 Washington St. SW. 33°44′59″N 84°23′21″W	Atlanta	
55	Church of the Sacred Heart of Jesus	Church of the Sacred Heart of Jesus	May 13, 1976 (#76000625)	335 Ivy St. [Peachtree Center], NE. 33°45′50″N 84°23′07″W	Atlanta	
56	Citizens and Southern Bank Building	Citizens and Southern Bank Building	August 18, 1977 (#77000426)	35 Broad St. 33°45′17″N 84°23′23″W	Atlanta	
57	Coca-Cola Building Annex	Coca-Cola Building Annex	October 18, 1996 (#96001138)	187 Edgewood Ave. 33°45′21″N 84°22′53″W	Atlanta	
58	College Park Historic District		November 15, 1996 (#96001338)	Roughly bounded by Vesta Ave., Yale Ave., Madison St., Harris St., and Washington Rd. 33°39′38″N 84°27′12″W	College Park	
59	College Street School	College Street School	July 21, 1995 (#95000902)	580 College St. 33°39′20″N 84°24′31″W	Hapeville	
60	Collier Heights Historic District		June 23, 2009 (#09000457)	Bounded approximately by Hamilton E. Holmes Drive on the east, Donald Lee Hollowell Parkway on the north, Interstate 285 on the west, and Interstate 20 on the south 33°46′19″N 84°29′02″W	Atlanta	
61	Collier-Perry-Bentley House	Collier-Perry-Bentley House	March 26, 2021 (#100006307)	1649 Lady Marian Ln. 33°47′58″N 84°22′53″W	Atlanta	
62	F. J. Cooledge and Sons, Company-Hastings' Seed Company	F. J. Cooledge and Sons, Company-Hastings' Seed Company	October 31, 1995 (#95001229)	434 Marietta St. 33°45′53″N 84°23′52″W	Atlanta	
63	Cox-Carlton Hotel	Cox-Carlton Hotel	November 1, 2006 (#06000960)	683 Peachtree St., NE. 33°46′28″N 84°23′05″W	Atlanta	Designed by Atlanta architectural firm Pringle and Smith in 1925
64	Crescent Apartments	Crescent Apartments	June 21, 1996 (#96000649)	979 Crescent Ave., NW. 33°46′52″N 84°23′04″W	Atlanta	Where Margaret Mitchell wrote much of Gone With the Wind
65	William H. Crogman School	William H. Crogman School	July 14, 2005 (#05000692)	1093 West Ave SW; 33°43′30″N 84°23′47″W	Atlanta	
66	Cyclorama of the Battle of Atlanta	Cyclorama of the Battle of Atlanta	December 9, 1971 (#71000274)	Cherokee Ave., Grant Park; 33°43′33″N 84°22′16″W	Atlanta	
67	H. B. Davis Building-Hotel Roxy	H. B. Davis Building-Hotel Roxy	September 11, 1997 (#97001123)	764–772 Marietta St. 33°46′32″N 84°24′16″W	Atlanta	
68	Dixie Coca-Cola Bottling Company Plant	Dixie Coca-Cola Bottling Company Plant	July 20, 1977 (#77000428)	125 Edgewood Ave. 33°45′16″N 84°23′03″W	Atlanta	National Historic Landmark
69	East Point Industrial District	East Point Industrial District	September 5, 1985 (#85001971)	Roughly bounded by Martin and Taylor Sts. Norman Berry Dr. and RR tracks 33°40′42″N 84°26′19″W	East Point	
70	Rutherford and Martha Ellis House		May 6, 2009 (#09000269)	543 W. Wesley Rd., NW. 33°49′47″N 84°24′20″W	Atlanta	
71	Empire Manufacturing Company Building	Empire Manufacturing Company Building	February 20, 2002 (#02000078)	575 Glen Iris Dr., NE. 33°46′19″N 84°22′01″W	Atlanta	
72	English-American Building	English-American Building	March 26, 1976 (#76000626)	74 Peachtree St. 33°45′22″N 84°23′19″W	Atlanta	
73	English Avenue School	English Avenue School	March 23, 2020 (#100005101)	627 English Ave. NW. 33°46′18″N 84°24′46″W	Atlanta	
74	Thomas and Rae Epting Lustron House		March 18, 1996 (#96000210)	1692 Brewer Boulevard, SW. 33°42′31″N 84°25′01″W	Atlanta	A Lustron house. Not extant. Google street view shows removed in 2016.
75	Fairburn Commercial Historic District	Fairburn Commercial Historic District	October 20, 1988 (#88002015)	Roughly along W. Broad St. and RR tracks between Smith and Dodd Sts. 33°34′00″N 84°34′54″W	Fairburn	
76	Fairlie-Poplar Historic District	Fairlie-Poplar Historic District	September 9, 1982 (#82002416)	Roughly bounded by Peachtree, Luckie, Cone, and Marietta Sts. 33°45′22″N 84°23′24″W	Atlanta	
77	Fire Station No. 11	Fire Station No. 11	February 12, 1980 (#80001073)	30 North Ave. 33°46′17″N 84°23′09″W	Atlanta	Architects were Morgan & Dillon. Built 1907. First fire station to respond to Winecoff Hotel fire in 1946.
78	First Congregational Church	First Congregational Church	January 19, 1979 (#79000720)	105 Courtland St., NE. 33°45′27″N 84°23′01″W	Atlanta	
79	First Methodist Episcopal Church, South	First Methodist Episcopal Church, South	December 7, 2010 (#10001000)	360 Peachtree St., NW; 33°45′52″N 84°23′09″W	Atlanta	
80	First Presbyterian Church of Atlanta	First Presbyterian Church of Atlanta	May 29, 2020 (#100005252)	1328 Peachtree St. NE; 33°47′27″N 84°23′07″W	Atlanta	
81	Ford Motor Company Assembly Plant	Ford Motor Company Assembly Plant	May 10, 1984 (#84001080)	699 Ponce de Leon Ave. 33°46′22″N 84°21′52″W	Atlanta	
82	Forscom Command Sergeant Major's Quarters		February 25, 1975 (#75000595)	Bldg. 532; 33°42′44″N 84°26′14″W	Fort McPherson	
83	Fort Peace	Fort Peace	September 18, 2018 (#100002982)	87 15th St. 33°47′18″N 84°23′05″W	Atlanta	
84	Fox Theatre	Fox Theatre	May 17, 1974 (#74002230)	600 Peachtree St. 33°46′20″N 84°23′12″W	Atlanta	National Historic Landmark
85	Fox Theatre Historic District	Fox Theatre Historic District	October 7, 1978 (#78003178)	Peachtree St. and Ponce de Leon Ave. 33°46′20″N 84°23′12″W	Atlanta	
86	Freeman Ford Building	Freeman Ford Building	August 6, 1998 (#98000968)	75 John Wesley Dobbs Ave. 33°45′31″N 84°23′04″W	Atlanta	
87	Fulton County Courthouse	Fulton County Courthouse	September 18, 1980 (#80001074)	160 Pryor St., SW. 33°45′03″N 84°23′27″W	Atlanta	
88	Garden Hills Historic District	Garden Hills Historic District	August 17, 1987 (#87001362)	Roughly bounded by Delmont and Brentwood and N. Hills Drs., Piemont, E. Wesley, and Peachtree Rds. 33°49′54″N 84°22′45″W	Atlanta	
89	Garrison Apartments	Garrison Apartments	January 29, 1979 (#79000721)	1325–1327 Peachtree St., NE. 33°47′27″N 84°23′05″W	Atlanta	
90	General Electric Company Repair Shop Warehouse	General Electric Company Repair Shop Warehouse	October 10, 2008 (#08000968)	488 Glenn Ave. 33°44′17″N 84°24′13″W	Fulton	
91	Georgia Institute of Technology Historic District	Georgia Institute of Technology Historic District	August 25, 1978 (#78000983)	225 North Ave. 33°46′21″N 84°23′40″W	Atlanta	
92	Georgia State Capitol	Georgia State Capitol	December 9, 1971 (#71001099)	Capitol Sq. 33°44′56″N 84°23′17″W	Atlanta	National Historic Landmark
93	Jeremiah S. Gilbert House	Jeremiah S. Gilbert House	April 17, 1980 (#80001075)	2238 Perkerson Rd., SW. 33°41′36″N 84°24′38″W	Atlanta	
94	Glenn Building	Glenn Building	April 29, 2008 (#08000350)	110 Marietta St. 33°45′25″N 84°23′34″W	Atlanta	
95	May Patterson Goodrum House		May 1, 2013 (#13000215)	320 West Paces Ferry Rd., NW. 33°50′38″N 84°23′46″W	Atlanta	
96	Grady Hospital	Grady Hospital	August 13, 1981 (#81000652)	36 Butler St., SE. 33°45′12″N 84°22′51″W	Atlanta	
97	Granada Apartments		January 26, 2026 (#100012626)	1302 West Peachtree Street. NW; 33°47′25″N 84°23′16″W	Atlanta	
98	Grant Park Historic District	Grant Park Historic District	July 20, 1979 (#79000722)	Roughly bounded by Glenwood and Atlanta Aves., Kelly and Eloise Sts. 33°44′10″N 84°22′18″W	Atlanta	
99	Grant Park North	Grant Park North	March 17, 1986 (#86000462)	Roughly bounded by Woodward Ave., Boulevard, I-20, and Hill St. 33°44′42″N 84°22′25″W	Atlanta	
100	W. D. Grant Building	W. D. Grant Building	January 8, 1979 (#79003318)	44 Broad St., NW. 33°45′20″N 84°23′24″W	Atlanta	
101	Great Atlantic & Pacific Tea Company	Great Atlantic & Pacific Tea Company	October 27, 2004 (#04001183)	881 Memorial Dr. 33°44′52″N 84°21′44″W	Atlanta	
102	Griffith School of Music	Griffith School of Music	May 12, 1999 (#99000552)	650 Bonaventore Ave., NE. 33°46′26″N 84°21′41″W	Atlanta	
103	Habersham Memorial Hall	Habersham Memorial Hall	June 7, 1974 (#74000676)	15th St., west of the junction with Piedmont Ave. 33°47′18″N 84°22′40″W	Atlanta	
104	Hapeville Historic District		October 14, 2009 (#09000824)	Bounded by I-75 on the east, Mt. Zion Rd. on the north, I-85 on the west, Airport Loop Rd. on the south, and Sylvan and Springdale Rds. west of I-85; 33°39′36″N 84°24′37″W	Hapeville	
105	Joel Chandler Harris House	Joel Chandler Harris House	October 15, 1966 (#66000281)	1050 Gordon St., SW. 33°44′15″N 84°25′20″W	Atlanta	National Historic Landmark
106	Healey Building	Healey Building	August 12, 1977 (#77000429)	57 Forsyth St. 33°45′22″N 84°23′23″W	Atlanta	
107	Herndon Home	Herndon Home	February 16, 2000 (#00000261)	587 University Place, NW. 33°45′21″N 84°24′25″W	Atlanta	National Historic Landmark
108	Highland School	Highland School	November 1, 2006 (#06000959)	978 North Ave., NE. 33°46′17″N 84°21′20″W	Atlanta	
109	Home Park School	Home Park School	July 26, 1989 (#89000851)	1031 State St., NW. 33°46′58″N 84°23′54″W	Atlanta	
110	B. Mifflin Hood Brick Company Building	B. Mifflin Hood Brick Company Building	December 6, 2018 (#100003173)	686 Greenwood Ave. NE; 33°46′36″N 84°21′53″W	Atlanta	Built in 1909 as the headquarters for the B. Mifflin Hood Brick Company. Located adjacent to the BeltLine.
111	Hotel Clermont	Hotel Clermont	March 29, 2021 (#100006310)	789 Ponce de Leon Ave. NE; 33°46′25″N 84°21′41″W	Atlanta	
112	Hotel Row Historic District	Hotel Row Historic District	July 20, 1989 (#89000802)	205–235 Mitchell St. 33°45′08″N 84°23′43″W	Atlanta	
113	House at 690 South Boulevard		December 6, 2018 (#100003174)	962 S Boulevard; 33°43′42″N 84°22′05″W	Atlanta	House has been renumbered per the scanned NRHP nomination.
114	Howell Interlocking Historic District		July 25, 2003 (#03000676)	Roughly centered on Howell Interlocking at Marietta, W. Marietta Sts., Howell Mill Rd. and Lowery Boulevard; 33°47′03″N 84°24′51″W	Atlanta	
115	Howell Station Historic District		April 17, 1997 (#97000352)	Roughly bounded by W. Marietta, Rice, Baylor, and Herndon Sts., Niles Cir., and Longley Ave. 33°47′06″N 84°25′11″W	Atlanta	
116	Mrs. George Arthur Howell Jr. House		January 11, 1991 (#90002101)	400 W. Paces Ferry Rd. NW. 33°50′38″N 84°23′52″W	Atlanta	
117	Hurt Building	Hurt Building	April 13, 1977 (#77000431)	45 Edgewood Ave., NE. 33°45′15″N 84°23′13″W	Atlanta	
118	Imperial Hotel	Imperial Hotel	March 31, 1983 (#83000229)	355 Peachtree St. 33°45′50″N 84°23′08″W	Atlanta	
119	Inman Park Historic District	Inman Park Historic District	July 23, 1973 (#73000621)	Roughly bounded by I-485, DeKalb and Lake Aves.; also roughly bounded by Lake, Hurt, and DeKalb Aves. and Krog St. 33°45′20″N 84°21′34″W	Atlanta	Second set of boundaries represents a boundary increase of September 16, 2001
120	Inman Park-Moreland Historic District	Inman Park-Moreland Historic District	June 5, 1986 (#86001209)	Roughly bounded by N. Highland, Seminole and Euclid, DeKalb, and Degress and Nashita Aves.; also roughly bounded by Cleburne, Moreland and DeKalb Aves., Battery Place, and a city park 33°45′50″N 84°21′07″W	Atlanta	Extends into DeKalb County. Second set of boundaries represents a boundary increase of October 13, 2003
121	Island Ford Lodge	Island Ford Lodge	November 4, 2016 (#16000747)	1978 Island Ford Parkway; 33°59′14″N 84°19′31″W	Sandy Springs	In the Chattahoochee River National Recreation Area.
122	King Plow Company	King Plow Company	March 28, 1996 (#96000337)	887 W. Marietta St. 33°46′53″N 84°24′58″W	Atlanta	
123	Martin Luther King, Jr., Historic District	Martin Luther King, Jr., Historic District	May 2, 1974 (#74000677)	Bounded roughly by Irwin, Randolph, Edgewood, Jackson, and Auburn Aves.; also roughly bounded by Freedom Parkway, John Wesley Dobbs Ave., Decatur St., the former Southern railroad tracks, and Interstates 75/85; 33°45′18″N 84°22′20″W	Atlanta	Second set of boundaries represents a boundary increase of June 12, 2001, is a National Historic Landmark
124	Martin Luther King, Jr., National Historic Site	Martin Luther King, Jr., National Historic Site	October 10, 1980 (#80000435)	Roughly bounded by Courtland, Randolph, Chamberlain Sts. and Irwin Ave. 33°45′18″N 84°22′20″W	Atlanta	
125	M.C. Kiser Company Building		May 28, 2019 (#100003966)	210 Pryor St. SW; 33°44′57″N 84°23′34″W	Atlanta	
126	William and Ruth Knight Lustron House		March 18, 1996 (#96000208)	1976 Northside Dr. 33°48′33″N 84°24′29″W	Atlanta	A Lustron house. Address is wrong on NRHP coversheet. Should be 1976 instead of 9166.
127	Knox Apartments, Cauthorn House and Peachtree Road Apartments Historic District	Knox Apartments, Cauthorn House and Peachtree Road Apartments Historic District	March 19, 1998 (#98000248)	2214–2230 Peachtree Rd. 33°48′54″N 84°23′31″W	Atlanta	
128	Victor H. Kriegshaber House	Victor H. Kriegshaber House	January 8, 1979 (#79000723)	292 Moreland Ave., NE. 33°45′44″N 84°20′58″W	Atlanta	
129	Lakewood Heights Historic District	Lakewood Heights Historic District	July 5, 2002 (#02000712)	Junction of Jonesboro Rd. and Lakewood Ave. 33°42′23″N 84°22′53″W	Atlanta	
130	Lindridge-Martin Manor Historic District		July 14, 2015 (#15000412)	Roughly bounded by Armand Rd., NE., Lindridge, Melante, & Cardova Drs., NE., Armand Ct., NE. 33°49′07″N 84°21′22″W	Atlanta	
131	Crawford W. Long Memorial Hospital	Crawford W. Long Memorial Hospital	September 1, 1988 (#88001465)	35 Linden Ave., NE. 33°46′10″N 84°23′09″W	Atlanta	Davis-Fischer Sanitarium (Crawford Long Hospital) designed by Atlanta architect Eugene C. Wachendorff in 1911.
132	Manuel's Tavern	Manuel's Tavern	May 29, 2020 (#100005253)	602 North Highland Ave. NE; 33°46′15″N 84°21′09″W	Atlanta	
133	Mark Inn East		January 7, 2026 (#100012512)	277 Moreland Avenue SE; 33°44′47″N 84°20′58″W	Atlanta	
134	Means Street Historic District	Means Street Historic District	June 14, 2001 (#01000648)	Bounded by Marietta St., Bankhead and Ponders Aves., and the Southern rail liNE. 33°46′22″N 84°24′18″W	Atlanta	
135	Medical Arts Building	Medical Arts Building	December 6, 2016 (#16000816)	384 Peachtree St. NE. 33°45′54″N 84°23′09″W	Atlanta	
136	Memorial to the Six Million	Memorial to the Six Million	April 21, 2008 (#08000351)	1173 Cascade Ave. SW. 33°43′26″N 84°26′57″W	Atlanta	
137	Kenneth and Hazel Meredith House	Kenneth and Hazel Meredith House	November 30, 2018 (#100003150)	417 Hillside Dr. NW; 33°52′12″N 84°24′03″W	Atlanta	
138	Methodist Cemetery		April 2, 2021 (#100006327)	100 Woodstock St. 34°01′47″N 84°21′25″W	Atlanta	
139	Methodist Center		June 9, 2023 (#100008493)	159 Ralph McGill Blvd. NE; 33°45′51″N 84°22′57″W	Atlanta	
140	Midtown Historic District	Midtown Historic District	February 12, 1999 (#99000161)	Roughly bounded by 10th St., Ponce de Leon Ave., Piedmont Ave., and Lakeview Ave. 33°46′40″N 84°22′28″W	Atlanta	
141	Milton Avenue School		November 12, 2026 (#100012513)	202 Milton Avenue SE; 33°43′14″N 84°22′54″W	Atlanta	
142	Mozley Park Historic District	Mozley Park Historic District	August 11, 1995 (#95000909)	Roughly bounded by Westview Dr., West Lake Ave., Seaboard Coast Line RR tracks and M. L. King and Rockmart Dr. 33°45′04″N 84°26′14″W	Atlanta	
143	National NuGrape Company	National NuGrape Company	December 20, 1996 (#96001502)	794 Ralph McGill Boulevard; 33°46′09″N 84°21′42″W	Atlanta	
144	New Hope African Methodist Episcopal Church and Cemetery	New Hope African Methodist Episcopal Church and Cemetery	January 9, 2009 (#08001281)	3012 Arden Rd., NW. 33°50′15″N 84°24′14″W	Atlanta	
145	Newtown Elementary School	Newtown Elementary School	August 30, 2006 (#06000739)	3115 Old Alabama Rd. 34°01′14″N 84°16′08″W	Johns Creek	
146	William P. Nicolson House	William P. Nicolson House	March 25, 1977 (#77000432)	821 Piedmont Ave. 33°46′36″N 84°22′52″W	Atlanta	
147	North Avenue Presbyterian Church	North Avenue Presbyterian Church	November 17, 1978 (#78000984)	607 Peachtree Ave., NE. 33°46′16″N 84°23′04″W	Atlanta	Designed by Bruce & Morgan. Built 1900.
148	Oakland Cemetery	Oakland Cemetery	April 28, 1976 (#76000627)	248 Oakland Ave., SE. 33°44′55″N 84°22′17″W	Atlanta	
149	Oakland City Historic District	Oakland City Historic District	April 11, 2003 (#03000198)	Bounded by Donnelly St., Lee St., Campbellton Rd., and Ingram Rd., Cascade Ave., Westmont Rd., and Epworth Rd. 33°43′41″N 84°25′40″W	Atlanta	
150	Odd Fellows Building and Auditorium	Odd Fellows Building and Auditorium	May 2, 1975 (#75000594)	228–250 Auburn Ave., NE. 33°45′20″N 84°22′46″W	Atlanta	
151	Omega Chapter of the Chi Phi Fraternity	Omega Chapter of the Chi Phi Fraternity	June 17, 1982 (#82002419)	720 Fowler St., NW. 33°46′27″N 84°23′38″W	Atlanta	
152	J. K. Orr Shoe Company	J. K. Orr Shoe Company	September 29, 1995 (#95001135)	16 William Holmes Borders Sr. Ave. 33°45′14″N 84°22′29″W	Atlanta	
153	Paces Ferry Tower		November 30, 2023 (#100009574)	374 East Paces Ferry Road; 33°50′20″N 84°22′30″W	Atlanta	
154	Palmer House and Phelan House Apartments	Palmer House and Phelan House Apartments	October 27, 2004 (#04001182)	952 Peachtree St. and 81 and 93 Peachtree Place; 33°46′56″N 84°23′04″W	Atlanta	
155	Park Street Methodist Episcopal Church, South		May 9, 1997 (#97000405)	793 Park St., SW. 33°44′38″N 84°24′49″W	Atlanta	
156	Peachtree Center Historic District	Peachtree Center Historic District	March 19, 2018 (#100002207)	Roughly bounded by Andrew Young International Blvd, Peachtree Center Ave, Courtland St., Baker St, and Williams St. 33°45′40″N 84°23′15″W	Atlanta	
157	Peachtree Christian Church	Peachtree Christian Church	May 17, 1984 (#84001082)	1580 Peachtree St. NW. 33°47′48″N 84°23′22″W	Atlanta	
158	Peachtree Heights Park		December 8, 1980 (#80004457)	Peachtree, Habersham, and Wesley Rds., Andrews Dr., and Peachtree Battle Ave. 33°49′34″N 84°23′34″W	Atlanta	
159	Peachtree Highlands Historic District		June 5, 1986 (#86001252)	Roughly bounded by Highland Dr., Martina Dr., E. Pace Ferry, and Piedmont Rds. 33°50′32″N 84°22′02″W	Atlanta	Superseded in 2008 by the larger Peachtree Highlands-Peachtree Park Historic District
160	Peachtree Highlands-Peachtree Park Historic District	Peachtree Highlands-Peachtree Park Historic District	April 25, 2008 (#08000325)	Roughly bounded by Piedmont & Peachtree Rds., GA 400 & MARTA N-S line. 33°50′08″N 84°21′50″W	Atlanta	
161	Peachtree Southern Railway Station	Peachtree Southern Railway Station	September 14, 1976 (#76000628)	1688 Peachtree St., NW. 33°47′58″N 84°23′34″W	Atlanta	Southern Railway's 1918 facility, named Peachtree Station but known locally as Brookwood Station, has been Atlanta's only long-distance passenger rail stop since 1970. Amtrak took over Southern's Crescent route in the '70s, which (as of 2015) continues to operate between New Orleans and N.Y. City.
162	Edward C. Peters House	Edward C. Peters House	January 20, 1972 (#72000384)	179 Ponce de Leon Ave. 33°46′51″N 84°22′50″W	Atlanta	A Queen Anne style house
163	Piedmont Park	Piedmont Park	May 13, 1976 (#76000629)	Bounded by 10th St., Southern Rwy. and Piedmont Rd. 33°47′17″N 84°22′27″W	Atlanta	
164	Piedmont Park Apartments	Piedmont Park Apartments	October 28, 2003 (#03001104)	266 11th St. 33°46′58″N 84°22′43″W	Atlanta	Designed by Leila Ross Wilburn
165	Thomas H. Pitts House and Dairy		June 27, 1979 (#79000724)	3105 Cascade Rd., SW. 33°43′16″N 84°29′22″W	Atlanta	
166	Pittsburgh Historic District		June 14, 2006 (#06000503)	Roughly bordered by Shelton Ave. Stewart Ave., University Ave., and the RR; 33°43′44″N 84°24′07″W	Atlanta	
167	Retail Credit Company Home Office Building	Retail Credit Company Home Office Building	January 8, 1980 (#80001076)	90 Fairlie St., SW. 33°45′25″N 84°23′24″W	Atlanta	
168	Reynoldstown Historic District	Reynoldstown Historic District	April 3, 2003 (#02001405)	Roughly bounded by the CSX rail line, Memorial Dr., Pearl St., and Moreland; 33°45′07″N 84°21′16″W	Atlanta	
169	Rhodes Memorial Hall	Rhodes Memorial Hall	March 1, 1974 (#74000678)	1516 Peachtree St. 33°47′45″N 84°23′18″W	Atlanta	
170	Rhodes-Haverty Building	Rhodes-Haverty Building	January 19, 1979 (#79000725)	134 Peachtree St., NW. 33°45′26″N 84°23′17″W	Atlanta	Architects: Pringle and Smith (1929)
171	Isaac Roberts House	Isaac Roberts House	April 10, 2008 (#08000262)	9725 Roberts Dr. 34°00′12″N 84°20′55″W	Sandy Springs	
172	Rock Spring Presbyterian Church	Rock Spring Presbyterian Church	May 24, 1990 (#90000804)	1824 Piedmont Ave. NE. 33°48′17″N 84°22′05″W	Atlanta	
173	Roscoe-Dunaway Gardens Historic District	Roscoe-Dunaway Gardens Historic District	December 6, 1996 (#96001414)	Roughly bounded by the Chattahoochee R., Cedar Cr., Hood Branch, and White Oak Cr. 33°29′54″N 84°50′00″W	Roscoe	
174	Rufus M. Rose House	Rufus M. Rose House	September 20, 1977 (#77000433)	537 Peachtree St. 33°46′08″N 84°23′05″W	Atlanta	Designed by architect Emil Charles Seiz. Built in 1901. Late Victorian/simplified Queen-Anne. Rare 19th-century town house of the affluent. Tiny yard is singular survivor from Peachtree Road's residential heyday.
175	F.H. Ross & Company Laundry Warehouse		December 17, 2020 (#100005906)	833 Memorial Dr. 33°44′48″N 84°21′37″W	Atlanta	
176	Roswell Historic District	Roswell Historic District	May 2, 1974 (#74000682)	Roughly bounded by Big Creek, King and Dam Sts., SW along New Marietta Hwy. 34°00′54″N 84°21′42″W	Roswell	Historic district including Roswell's town square, with 28 contributing buildings.
177	Simeon and Jane Rucker Log House	Simeon and Jane Rucker Log House	April 18, 1997 (#97000353)	755 Old Rucker Rd. 34°04′43″N 84°20′23″W	Alpharetta	
178	St. Andrews Apartments	St. Andrews Apartments	June 13, 1986 (#86001260)	1041 W. Peachtree St. 33°47′04″N 84°23′14″W	Atlanta	
179	St. Mark Methodist Church	St. Mark Methodist Church	November 2, 1987 (#87001911)	781 Peachtree St. 33°46′37″N 84°23′02″W	Atlanta	Architect: Willis Franklin Denny. Built 1902-1903.
180	Sardis Methodist Church and Cemetery	Sardis Methodist Church and Cemetery	October 9, 2012 (#12000840)	3725 Powers Ferry Road; 33°51′27″N 84°23′01″W	Atlanta	
181	Sears, Roebuck and Co. Mail-Order Warehouse and Retail Store	Sears, Roebuck and Co. Mail-Order Warehouse and Retail Store	November 15, 2016 (#16000769)	675 Ponce de Leon Ave., NE. 33°46′23″N 84°21′58″W	Atlanta	Now Ponce City Market
182	Selig Company Building	Selig Company Building	February 22, 1996 (#96000158)	330–346 Marietta St. 33°45′43″N 84°23′49″W	Atlanta	
183	Shrine of the Immaculate Conception	Shrine of the Immaculate Conception	December 12, 1976 (#76000630)	48 Hunter St., SW. 33°45′01″N 84°23′22″W	Atlanta	
184	Archibald Smith House	Archibald Smith House	August 30, 2006 (#06000740)	935 Alpharetta St. 34°01′26″N 84°21′36″W	Roswell	
185	Tullie Smith House	Tullie Smith House	November 20, 1970 (#70000204)	3099 Andrews Dr., NW. 33°50′26″N 84°23′08″W	Atlanta	
186	South-View Cemetery		July 6, 2026 (#100013193)	1990 Jonesboro Road, SE; 33°42′05″N 84°22′21″W	Atlanta	
187	Southern Bell Telephone Company Building	Southern Bell Telephone Company Building	December 1, 1978 (#78000985)	51 Ivy St., NE. 33°45′20″N 84°23′08″W	Atlanta	
188	Southern Belting Company Building	Southern Belting Company Building	August 10, 1988 (#88001174)	236 Forsyth St., SW. 33°44′53″N 84°23′48″W	Atlanta	
189	Southern Dairies	Southern Dairies	August 21, 2002 (#02000872)	593 Glen Iris Dr. 33°46′21″N 84°22′03″W	Atlanta	
190	Southern Railway North Avenue Yards Historic District		July 16, 2002 (#02000539)	539 John St. NW. 33°46′09″N 84°24′00″W	Atlanta	
191	Southern Spring Bed Company	Southern Spring Bed Company	March 1, 2007 (#07000088)	300 Martin Luther King Jr. Dr. 33°44′57″N 84°22′33″W	Atlanta	
192	Sperry & Hutchinson Company Warehouse		February 25, 2021 (#100006164)	2181 Sylvan Rd. 33°41′42″N 84°25′08″W	East Point	
193	Spotswood Hall		February 5, 2002 (#01001556)	555 Argonne Dr., NW. 33°50′13″N 84°24′19″W	Atlanta	
194	Staff Row and Old Post Area-Fort McPherson		November 5, 1974 (#74000679)	NE corner of Fort McPherson; also 1777 Hardee Avenue; 33°42′40″N 84°25′50″W	Atlanta	Second set of boundaries represents a boundary increase of September 6, 2013
195	Stewart Avenue Industrial Historic District		January 30, 2026 (#100012668)	Generally bounded by I-20 to the north, the railroad and McDaniel Street SW to the east, Shelton Avenue SW and Stephens Street SW to the south, and the railroad and Murphy; 33°44′17″N 84°24′30″W	Atlanta	
196	Stewart Avenue Methodist Episcopal Church South	Stewart Avenue Methodist Episcopal Church South	March 2, 1989 (#89000154)	867 Stewart Ave., SW. 33°43′52″N 84°24′30″W	Atlanta	
197	Stone Hall, Atlanta University	Stone Hall, Atlanta University	December 2, 1974 (#74000680)	Morris-Brown College campus 33°45′16″N 84°24′31″W	Atlanta	National Historic Landmark
198	Stonewall Park Historic District		December 10, 2020 (#100005890)	Roughly Gift, Lytle, Florida, Sanders, and Glenwood Aves. SE, portions of Hemlock Cir. 33°44′28″N 84°21′09″W	Atlanta	
199	Swan House	Swan House	September 13, 1977 (#77000434)	3099 Andrews Dr., NW. 33°50′25″N 84°23′17″W	Atlanta	
200	Sweet Auburn Historic District	Sweet Auburn Historic District	December 8, 1976 (#76000631)	Auburn Ave. 33°45′14″N 84°22′52″W	Atlanta	National Historic Landmark
201	The Temple	The Temple	September 9, 1982 (#82002420)	1589 Peachtree St. 33°47′52″N 84°23′21″W	Atlanta	
202	The Texas	The Texas	June 19, 1973 (#73002234)	Cyclorama Bldg., Grant Park; 33°44′02″N 84°22′15″W	Atlanta	Steam locomotive that chased in the Great Locomotive Chase
203	Albert E. Thornton House		December 8, 1980 (#80004458)	105 W. Paces Ferry Rd. 33°50′41″N 84°23′27″W	Atlanta	
204	Thorton Building	Thorton Building	February 23, 1984 (#84001107)	10 Pryor St. (10 Park Place South); 33°45′15″N 84°23′19″W	Atlanta	
205	Henry B. Tompkins House	Henry B. Tompkins House	December 12, 1976 (#76000633)	125 W. Wesley Rd., NW. 33°49′44″N 84°23′29″W	Atlanta	
206	Trio Steam Laundry	Trio Steam Laundry	September 18, 1997 (#97001122)	19 Hilliard St. 33°41′32″N 84°22′46″W	Atlanta	
207	Troy Peerless Laundry Building	Troy Peerless Laundry Building	September 9, 1999 (#99001100)	650 Glen Iris Dr. 33°46′32″N 84°22′05″W	Atlanta	
208	Trust Company of Georgia Northeast Freeway Branch	Trust Company of Georgia Northeast Freeway Branch	February 20, 2018 (#100002093)	2160 Monroe Dr. NE; 33°48′39″N 84°22′12″W	Atlanta	Built in 1962
209	Trygveson		December 8, 1980 (#80004241)	3418 Pinestream Rd., NW. 33°50′54″N 84°25′21″W	Atlanta	
210	Tuxedo Park Historic District		February 24, 2025 (#100011463)	Bounded by West Paces Ferry Road, Northside Drive, Broadland Road, Pineland Road, King Road, Tuxedo Road, Blackland Road, Blackland Drive, and Valley Road. 33°51′00″N 84°23′58″W	Atlanta	
211	Mary Elizabeth Tyler House		January 30, 2006 (#05001598)	2887 Howell Mill Rd. 33°50′02″N 84°25′03″W	Atlanta	
212	Tyree Building	Tyree Building	July 15, 1982 (#82002421)	679 Durant Pl., NE. 33°46′23″N 84°22′31″W	Atlanta	
213	U.S. Post Office and Courthouse	U.S. Post Office and Courthouse	May 2, 1974 (#74000681)	76 Forsyth St. 33°45′23″N 84°23′25″W	Atlanta	Many key cases from the civil rights movement first heard here, is a National Historic Landmark
214	Underground Atlanta Historic District	Underground Atlanta Historic District	July 24, 1980 (#80001077)	Roughly bounded by Martin Luther King Jr. Dr., Central Ave., Wall and Peachtree Sts. 33°45′07″N 84°23′21″W	Atlanta	
215	United States Post Office, Federal Annex	United States Post Office, Federal Annex	February 10, 2006 (#04001217)	77 Forsyth St. 33°45′16″N 84°23′40″W	Atlanta	
216	Utoy Cemetery	Utoy Cemetery	February 23, 2015 (#15000025)	1465 Cahaba Dr. 33°42′57″N 84°26′59″W	Atlanta	
217	E. Van Winkle Gin and Machine Works	E. Van Winkle Gin and Machine Works	September 10, 1979 (#79000726)	Foster St. 33°47′08″N 84°24′59″W	Atlanta	Goat Farm Arts Center
218	Villa Lamar		June 8, 1988 (#88001152)	801 West Paces Ferry Rd. 33°51′01″N 84°24′47″W	Atlanta	
219	Virginia-Highland Historic District	Virginia-Highland Historic District	May 10, 2005 (#05000402)	Roughly bounded by Amsterdam Ave., Rosedale Rd., Ponce de Leon Ave., and the Norfolk Southern Railroad; 33°46′59″N 84°21′25″W	Atlanta	
220	Anne Wallace Branch-Carnegie Library of Atlanta	Anne Wallace Branch-Carnegie Library of Atlanta	December 4, 2003 (#03001223)	523 Luckie St. NW. 33°46′14″N 84°23′46″W	Atlanta	
221	Washington Carver Homes		January 18, 2023 (#100008543)	1100 Washington Cir. 33°40′33″N 84°25′42″W	East Point	
222	Washington Park Historic District		February 28, 2000 (#00000071)	Junction of Martin Luther King Jr. Dr. and Ashby St. 33°45′36″N 84°25′16″W	Atlanta	
223	Booker T. Washington High School	Booker T. Washington High School	March 18, 1986 (#86000437)	45 Whitehouse Dr. SW. 33°45′12″N 84°25′18″W	Atlanta	
224	West End Historic District	West End Historic District	February 25, 1999 (#97000621)	Roughly Bounded by US 20, Lee, White, and Langhorn Sts. 33°44′16″N 84°25′23″W	Atlanta	
225	Western Electric Company Building	Western Electric Company Building	November 8, 2000 (#00001329)	820 Ralph McGill Boulevard; 33°46′11″N 84°21′40″W	Atlanta	
226	Westinghouse Electric Company Building	Westinghouse Electric Company Building	February 9, 2001 (#01000080)	426 Marietta St., NW. 33°46′00″N 84°23′52″W	Atlanta	
227	Westview Cemetery	Westview Cemetery	June 4, 2020 (#100005254)	1680 Ralph David Abernathy Blvd. SW; 33°44′46″N 84°26′35″W	Atlanta	
228	Whitehall Street Retail Historic District	Whitehall Street Retail Historic District	August 6, 2020 (#100005409)	Centered on Peachtree St. and Martin Luther King Jr. Dr. including Forsyth, Broad, Peachtree, and Mitchell Sts. 33°45′08″N 84°23′32″W	Atlanta	
229	Whittier Mills Historic District	Whittier Mills Historic District	September 13, 2001 (#01000972)	Roughly the junction of Bolton Rd. and Parrot Ave., approximately 7 miles (11 km) northwest of the central business district of Atlanta; 33°48′42″N 84°29′01″W	Atlanta	
230	Winecoff Hotel	Winecoff Hotel	March 31, 2009 (#09000185)	179 Peachtree Street, NW. 33°49′30″N 84°23′16″W	Atlanta	
231	Winnwood Apartments	Winnwood Apartments	April 15, 2021 (#100006379)	1460 West Peachtree St. NW. 33°47′40″N 84°23′17″W	Atlanta	
232	George Jr. and Emily Winship House		May 10, 2005 (#05000404)	2626 Brookwood Dr., NE. 33°49′40″N 84°22′53″W	Atlanta	
233	Stuart Witham House		December 22, 1978 (#78000986)	2922 Andrews Dr., NW. 33°50′06″N 84°23′35″W	Atlanta	
234	Wynne-Claughton Building	Wynne-Claughton Building	March 26, 2012 (#12000148)	141 Carnegie Way, NW. 33°45′30″N 84°23′18″W	Atlanta	

== Former listings ==
	Name on the Register	Image	Date listed	Date removed	Location	City or town	Description
1	Atlanta and West Point Railroad Freight Depot		March 26, 1976 (#76000620)	May 29, 2026	215 Decatur St. 33°45′32″N 84°22′58″W	Atlanta	Building no longer exists.
2	Levi Ballard House	Levi Ballard House	October 22, 1980 (#80001080)	May 29, 2026	U.S. 29 and GA 154; 33°31′46″N 84°39′43″W	Palmetto	Evidently torn down, according to a facebook page.
3	Dr. Marion Luther Brittain Sr. House	Dr. Marion Luther Brittain Sr. House	September 23, 1993 (#93000999)	May 29, 2026	1109 W. Peachtree St. 33°47′06″N 84°23′15″W	Atlanta	Demolished in 2017.
4	Carnegie Library of Atlanta	Carnegie Library of Atlanta	October 22, 1976 (#76000624)	October 26, 1977	126 Carnegie Way, NW	Atlanta	Demolished in 1977 to build the current Atlanta Central Library.
5	Degive's Grand Opera House	Degive's Grand Opera House	June 17, 1977 (#77000427)	May 29, 2026	157 Peachtree St., NE. 33°45′27″N 84°23′13″W	Atlanta	
6	Farlinger		September 30, 1982 (#82002417)	May 29, 2026	343 Peachtree St., NE. 33°45′49″N 84°23′09″W	Atlanta	Demolished in 1988
7	Fulton County Almshouse		February 8, 2014 (#13001169)	December 3, 2024	215 W. Wieuca Rd., NW. 33°52′31″N 84°23′34″W	Atlanta	
8	Glenridge Hall		June 17, 1982 (#82002418)	September 17, 2015	6615 Glenridge Dr. 33°56′09″N 84°21′50″W	Sandy Springs	Demolished April 9, 2015
9	Hillyer Trust Building		July 25, 1977 (#77000430)	April 8, 1980	140 Peachtree St.	Atlanta	Delisted due to the removal of the top 5 floors of the building in 1978.
10	William G. Raoul House		December 15, 1986 (#86003298)	May 29, 2026	848 Peachtree St. 33°46′40″N 84°23′06″W	Atlanta	
11	Charles E. Sciple House		March 1, 1984 (#84001084)	May 29, 2026	1112 Peachtree St. 33°47′06″N 84°23′00″W	Atlanta	
12	Techwood Homes Historic District	Techwood Homes Historic District	June 29, 1976 (#76000632)	May 29, 2026	Roughly bounded by North Ave., Parker, Williams, and Lovejoy Sts. 33°46′04″N 84°23′30″W	Atlanta	
13	Western and Atlantic Railroad Zero Milepost	Western and Atlantic Railroad Zero Milepost	September 19, 1977 (#77000435)	April 26, 2019	Central Ave. between Wall St. and Railroad Ave. 33°45′08″N 84°23′19″W	Atlanta	
14	Judge William Wilson House	Judge William Wilson House	February 15, 1980 (#80001078)	November 27, 2020	501 Fairburn Rd., SW. 33°44′46″N 84°30′41″W	Atlanta	Demolished.
15	Yonge Street School	Yonge Street School	January 24, 1980 (#80001079)	May 29, 2026	89 Yonge St. 33°45′06″N 84°22′31″W	Atlanta	

== See also ==
- National Register of Historic Places listings in Georgia (U.S. state)
- List of National Historic Landmarks in Georgia (U.S. state)
