= Hotel Roxy =

- Davis, H.B., Building--Hotel Roxy
- U.S. National Register of Historic Places
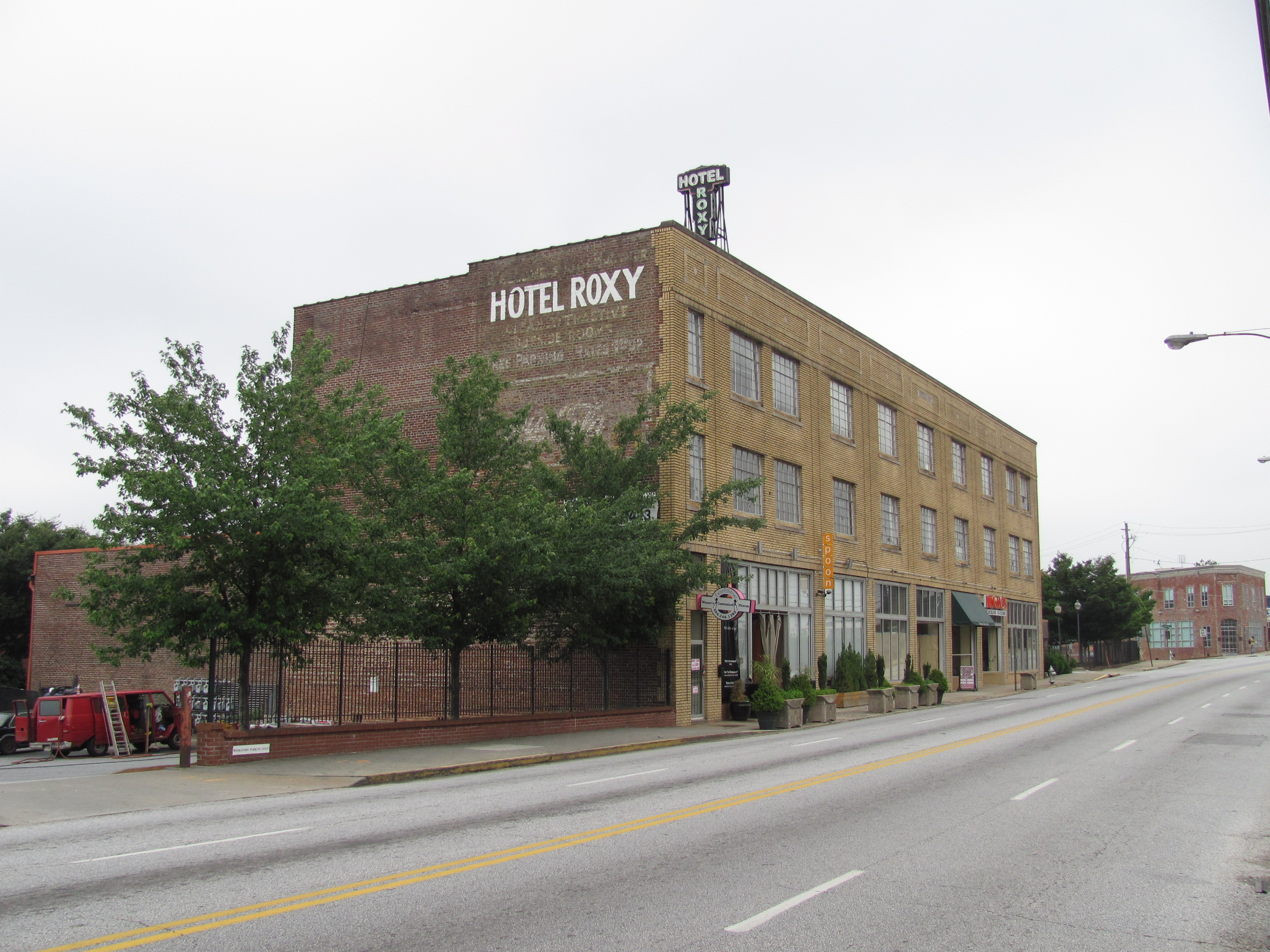
- Hotel Roxy, formerly the H. B. Davis Building

- Location within Georgia Location within the United States
- Location: 764-772 Marietta St., Atlanta, Georgia
- Coordinates: 33°46′32″N 84°24′16″W
- Area: 16 acres (6.5 ha)
- Built: 1921
- Architectural style: Stripped Classical
- NRHP reference No.: 97001123
- Added to NRHP: September 11, 1997

Hotel Roxy, formerly the H. B. Davis Building is a historic building in Atlanta, Georgia. It was built in 1921. The commercial building was renovated in 1995 and adapted into loft apartments and a retail/ restaurant space.

The building was added to the National Register of Historic Places in 1997.

The building is located at 764–772 Marietta Street.

It is a red brick building with bricks laid in common bond with six stretcher courses.

== See also ==
- National Register of Historic Places listings in Fulton County, Georgia
