= Craigie House =

Former historic home in Atlanta, Georgia

Coordinates: 33.7878°N 84.3783°W

The Craigie House was a historic home located at 1204 Piedmont Avenue NE in Atlanta, Georgia, across from Piedmont Park. Built in 1911, it originally served as the home of the local chapter (the first in Georgia) of the Daughters of the American Revolution, and was the second-oldest DAR structure in the United States. Historians believe parts of the home were brought from the park after the 1895 Cotton States Exposition was held there.

It is listed on the National Register of Historic Places, but was not given any legal protection by the city. A tree fell on the building during the mid 1980s, and it was again damaged by Hurricane Opal in 1995. It was listed as one of the state's most endangered historic places by the Georgia Trust for Historic Preservation in 2011, and after having changed hands multiple times, was purchased in March 2013 by a person who later began to renovate the interior for use as a private home while preserving the exterior.

During the February 2014 winter storm, most of the building collapsed, except for the front façade. The combination of snow, sleet, and freezing rain apparently triggered the disaster, which did not injure anyone since it was still vacant during renovations, and at night, with workers (and nearly all Atlantans) having stayed at home for the day due to the storm. The owner still intends to at least save the historic front when rebuilding.

The remains of the building were demolished in April 2016.
