= M. Rich Building =

Coordinates: 33.7522°N 84.3916°W

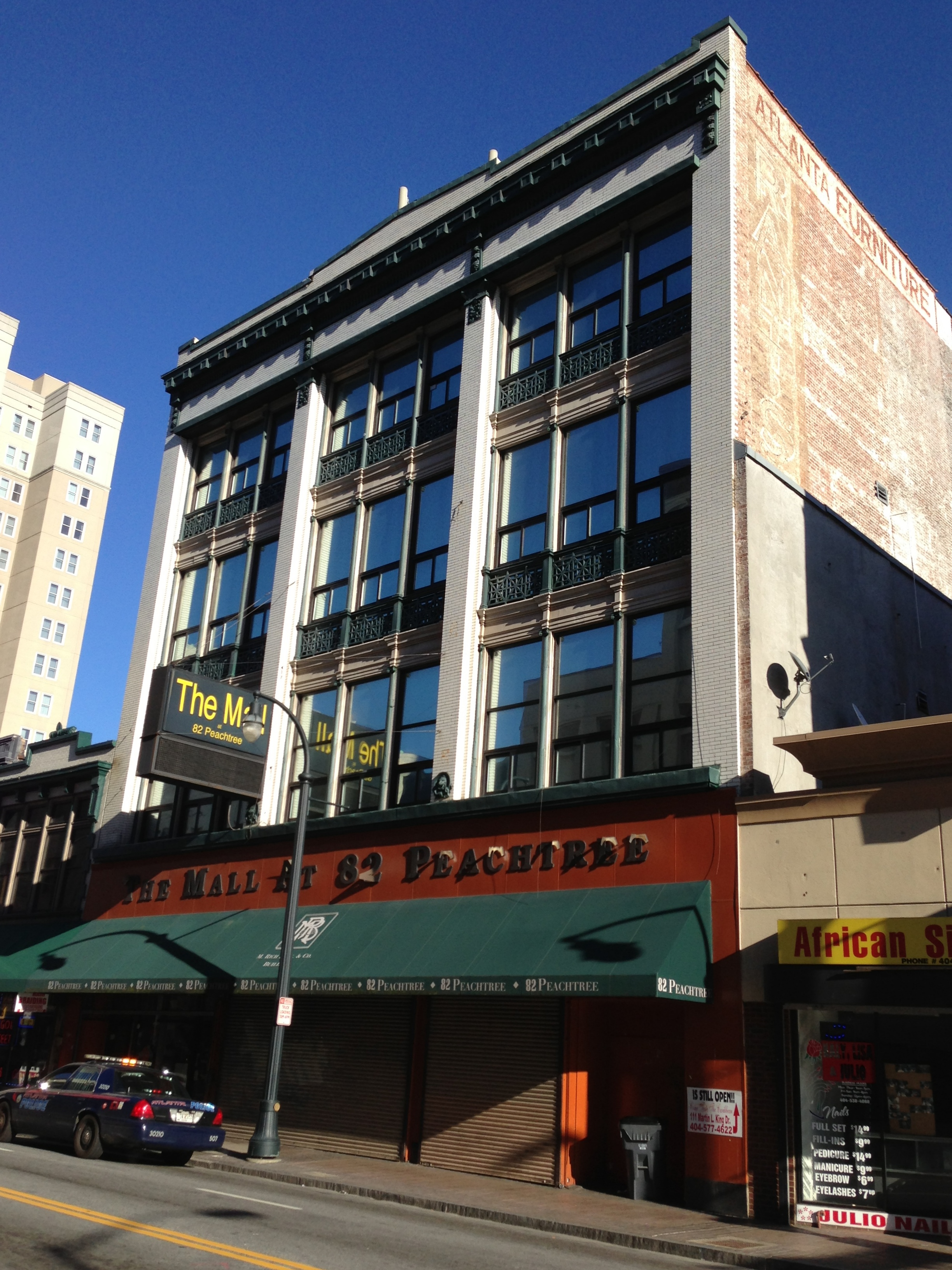
Rich's 1907 building at 52-54-56 Whitehall, now 82 Peachtree St. SW, as seen in 2013

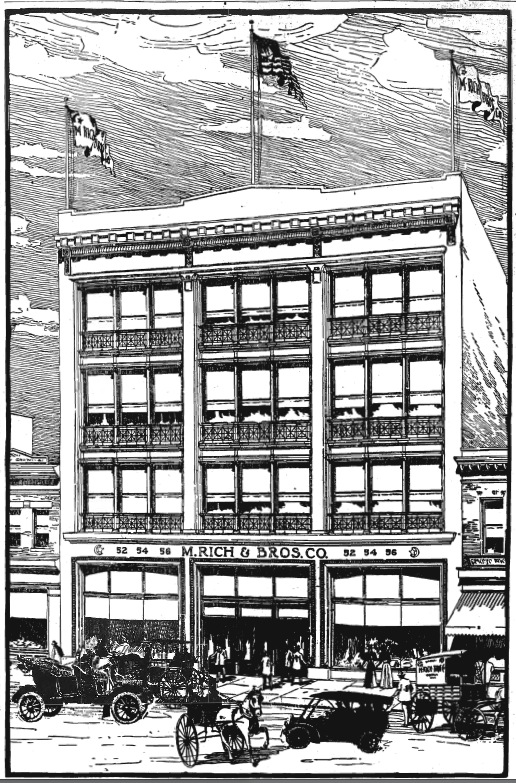
M. Rich Building on opening in 1907 - illustration from Atlanta Constitution April 28, 1907

The M. Rich Building, also known as the M. Rich and Brothers and Company Building and the W. T. Grant Building at 82 Peachtree Street SW (formerly 52-54-56 Whitehall), Atlanta, is a landmark building significant for both architectural and commercial reasons. It housed Rich's department store from the time it was completed in 1907 until it moved into its much larger premises at Broad and Alabama streets in 1924.

In September 1882 Rich's moved to 54-56 Whitehall and in 1906, the adjacent M. Kutz & Co. building at 52 Whitehall was acquired. Both it and the Rich store at 54-56 Whitehall were torn down. Rich's closed its furniture annex and moved its dry goods to that building temporarily, while a new building was built on the site of 52-54-56 Whitehall designed by noted local architectural firm Bruce & Morgan. In April 1907 the new emporium opened for business.

In 1924, Rich's moved to new, much larger Palazzo style quarters at Broad and Alabama streets. From 1925 to 1974 the W. T. Grant discount department store operated here. Later owners and occupants of the building were:

- 1978–1986 Patrick Swindall, Atlanta Furniture Company
- 1986–1990 Trion-Winter-MLK Joint Venture
- 1990–? Patrick Swindall, The Great Five Points Flea Market
- 1998–present The Mall at 82 Peachtree occupies the bottom two floors of the building

Today, most of the building operates as the M. Rich Center for Creative Arts, Media and Technology.

In 2020, the building and surrounding area were added to the National Register of Historic Places as part of the Whitehall Street Retail Historic District.
