= Island Ford Lodge =

Historic property in Georgia, United States

- U.S. National Register of Historic Places
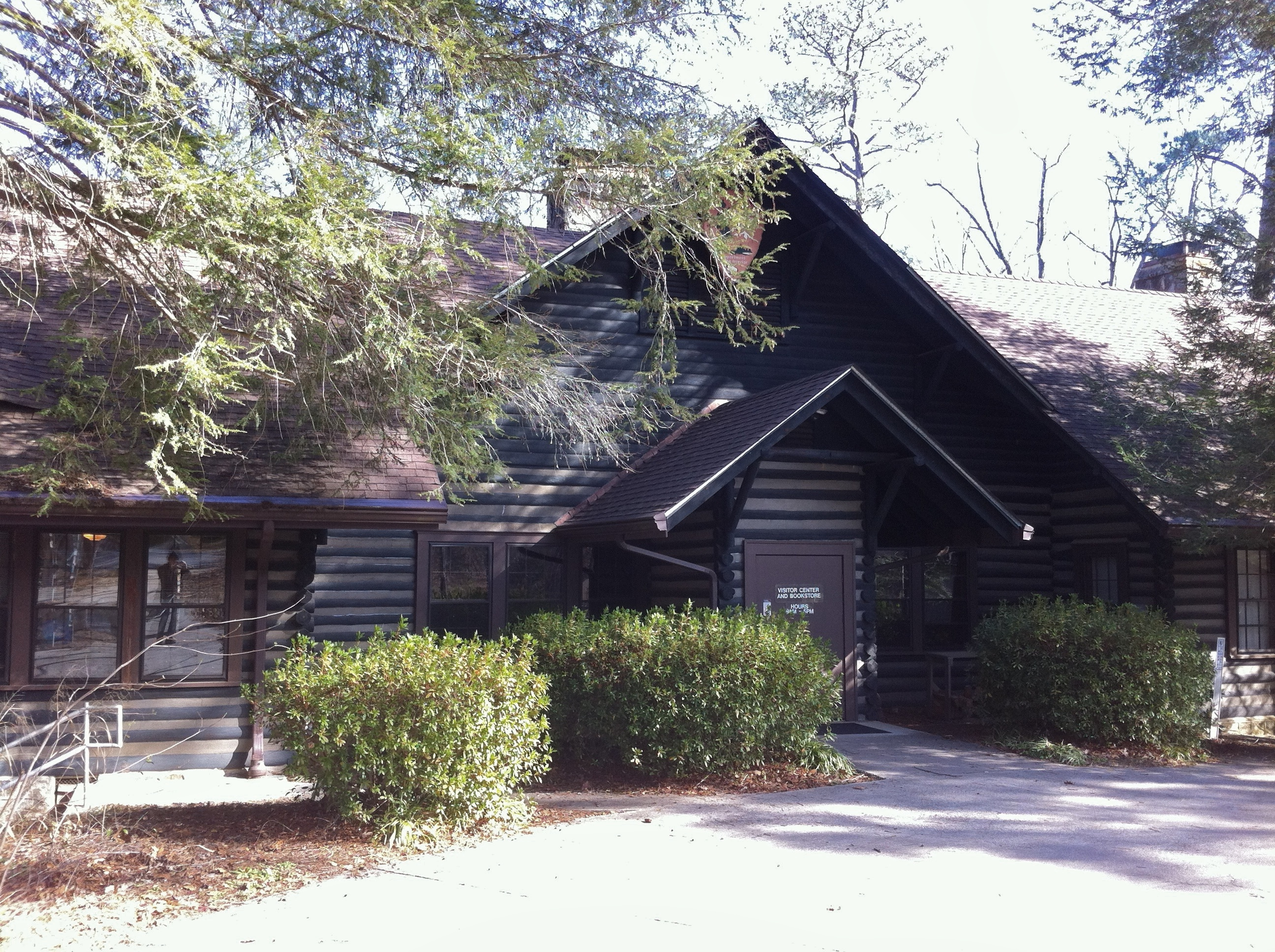
- Island Ford Lodge in 2012
- Location: Sandy Springs, Georgia
- Coordinates: 33°59′14″N 84°19′29″W
- Built: 1935
- NRHP reference No.: 16000747
- Added to NRHP: November, 2016

The Island Ford Lodge is an historic property in Sandy Springs, Fulton County, Georgia, in the United States. It was built as a summer home for Atlanta attorney Samuel Dunbar Hewlett c. 1935 by stonemason John Epps. Hewlett was chief of staff for Georgia governor Eugene Talmadge through Talmadge's first two terms as governor, from 1933 to 1937. Hewlett sold the lodge to the Buckhead Century Club in 1950, retaining rights to an apartment in the building. The club disbanded in 1955 and sold the property to the Atlanta Baptist Assembly, which used the lodge as a retreat for twenty years. After Chattahoochee River National Recreation Area was established in 1978 the property was acquired by the National Park Service. The property was renovated in the early 1980s and serves as the park headquarters.

Island Ford Lodge was added to the National Register of Historic Places in November 2016.

== See also ==
- National Register of Historic Places listings in Fulton County, Georgia
