= M.C. Kiser Company Building =

- M.C. Kiser Building
- U.S. National Register of Historic Places
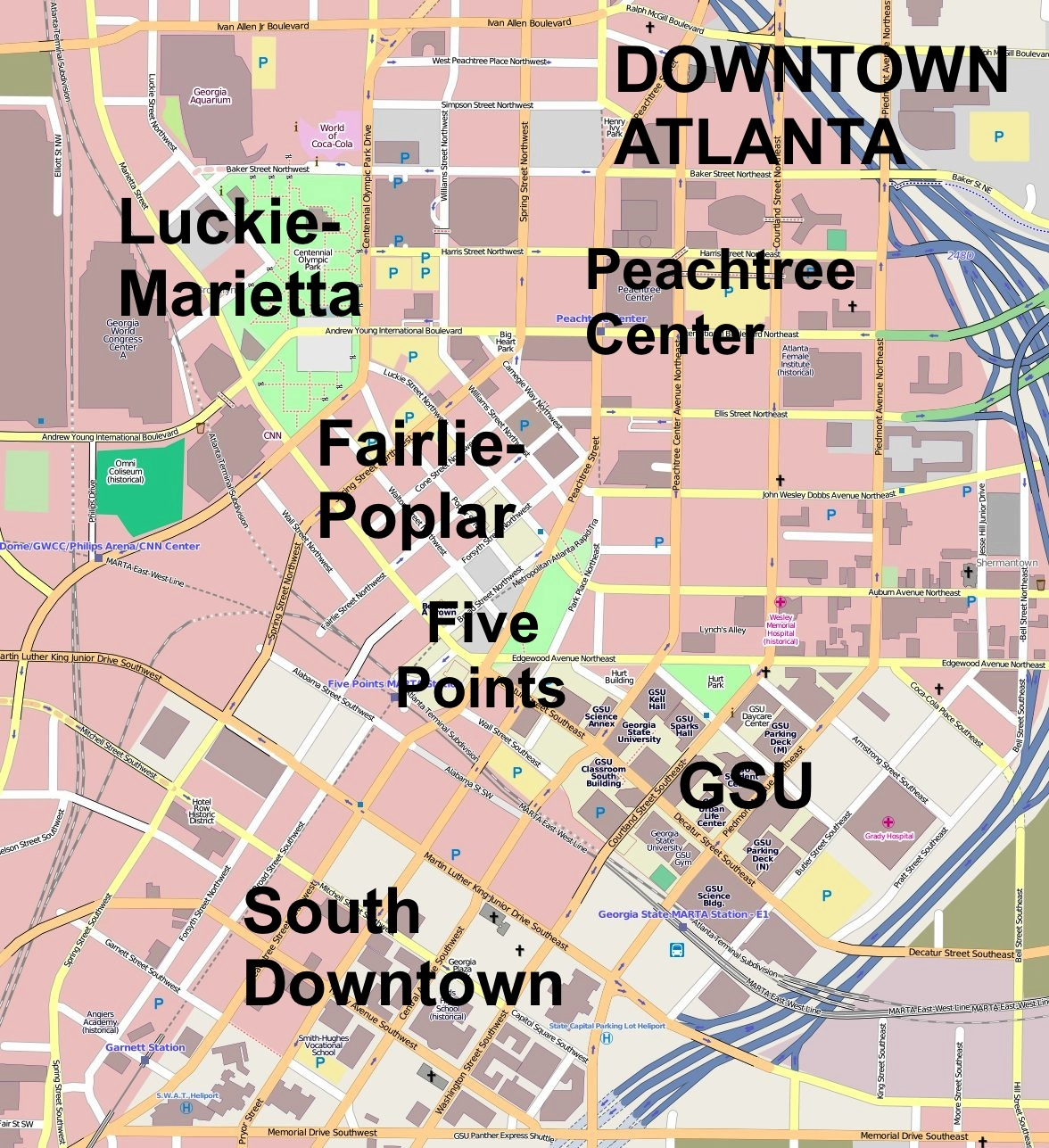
- Location within Downtown Atlanta Location within Atlanta Location within Georgia Location within the United States
- Location: 210 Pryor Street; Atlanta, Georgia, United States
- Coordinates: 33°44′57″N 84°23′34″W
- Built: 1923
- NRHP reference No.: 100003966
- Added to NRHP: May 28, 2019

The M.C. Kiser Company Building is a historic building in Atlanta, Georgia, United States. Located in the South Downtown neighborhood, it was built in 1923 as a shoe factory, converted to apartments in 2017, and added to the National Register of Historic Places in 2019.

== History ==
The building was constructed in 1923 to house the M.C. Kiser Company, a shoe manufacturing company founded in Atlanta in the late 1800s. The company, described in a 1920 article of The Atlanta Constitution as “one of the most important business establishments of Atlanta,” had outgrown its previous facilities, and this building was constructed primarily as a factory, warehouse, and retail center for their Shield Brand Shoes line. The company used the building until 1933, and afterwards it was used by various commercial entities.

In March 2016, local developer Gallman Development Group announced plans to convert the building to an apartment building. Gallman, which had previously converted warehouses in Atlanta's Castleberry Hill neighborhood to lofts, planned to convert the building to an "industrial chic" living space, and that month secured $8.5 million in funding. Initially, they planned to open in spring 2017. However, construction was prevented from starting until January 2017. A report in July stated that the building would house 36 one-bedroom apartments and five two-bedroom apartments, with a Curbed Atlanta article from July stating that the property could be marketed as student housing due to its proximity to Georgia State University.

On May 28, 2019, the property was added to the National Register of Historic Places.

== Design and architecture ==
The brick building features three stories with a basement. As it was originally built, the bottom floor was used primarily for retail, while the upper two floors were used for warehousing and as a factory. The exterior of the building features minimal ornamentation or design. The structure is an example of "mill" or "slow-burning" architecture, designed for fire prevention.

== See also ==
- National Register of Historic Places listings in Fulton County, Georgia
