= Whitehall Street Retail Historic District =

Historic district in Georgia, United States

- U.S. National Register of Historic Places
- U.S. Historic district
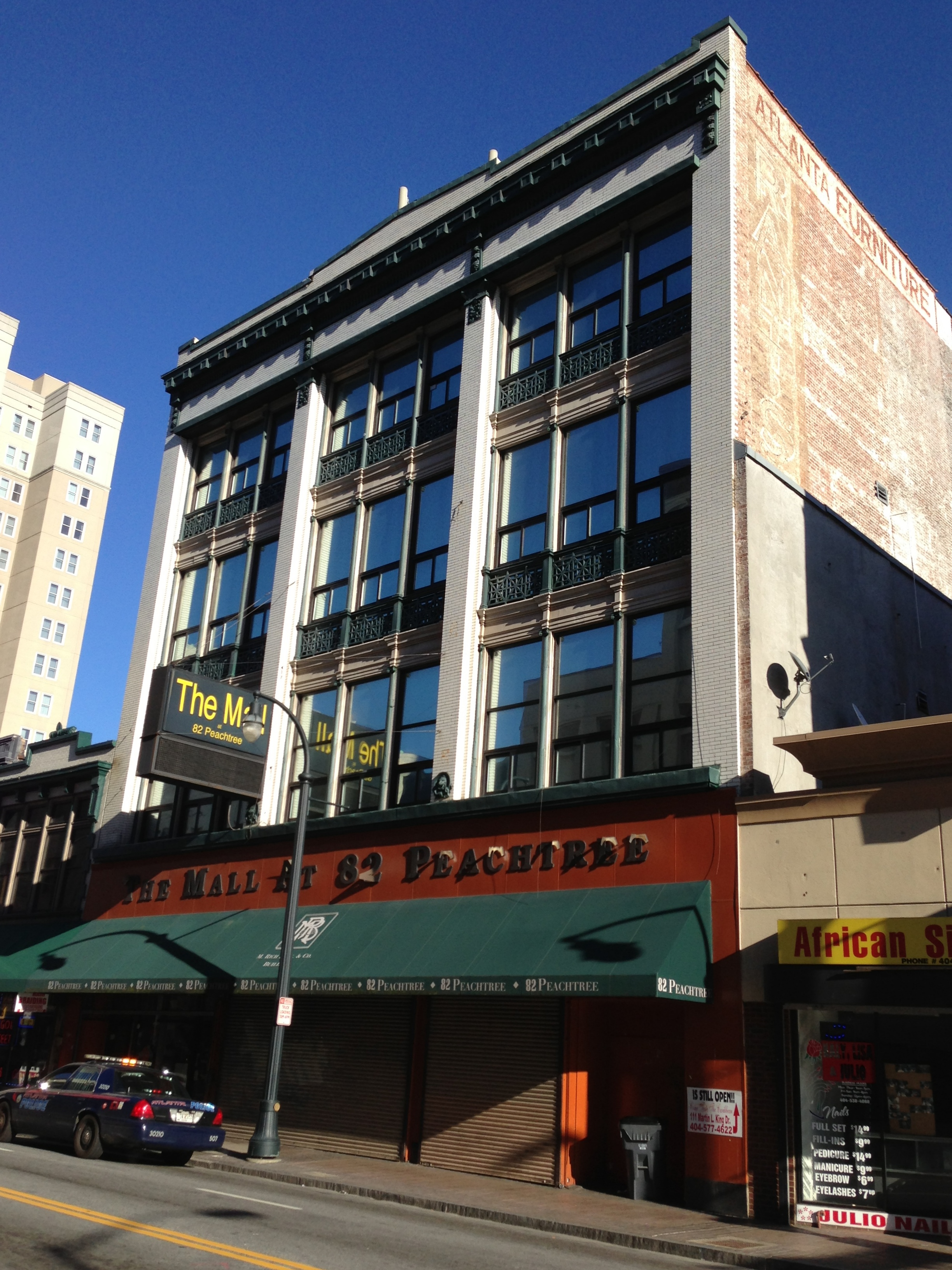
- The M. Rich Building, a contributing property of the district (2013)

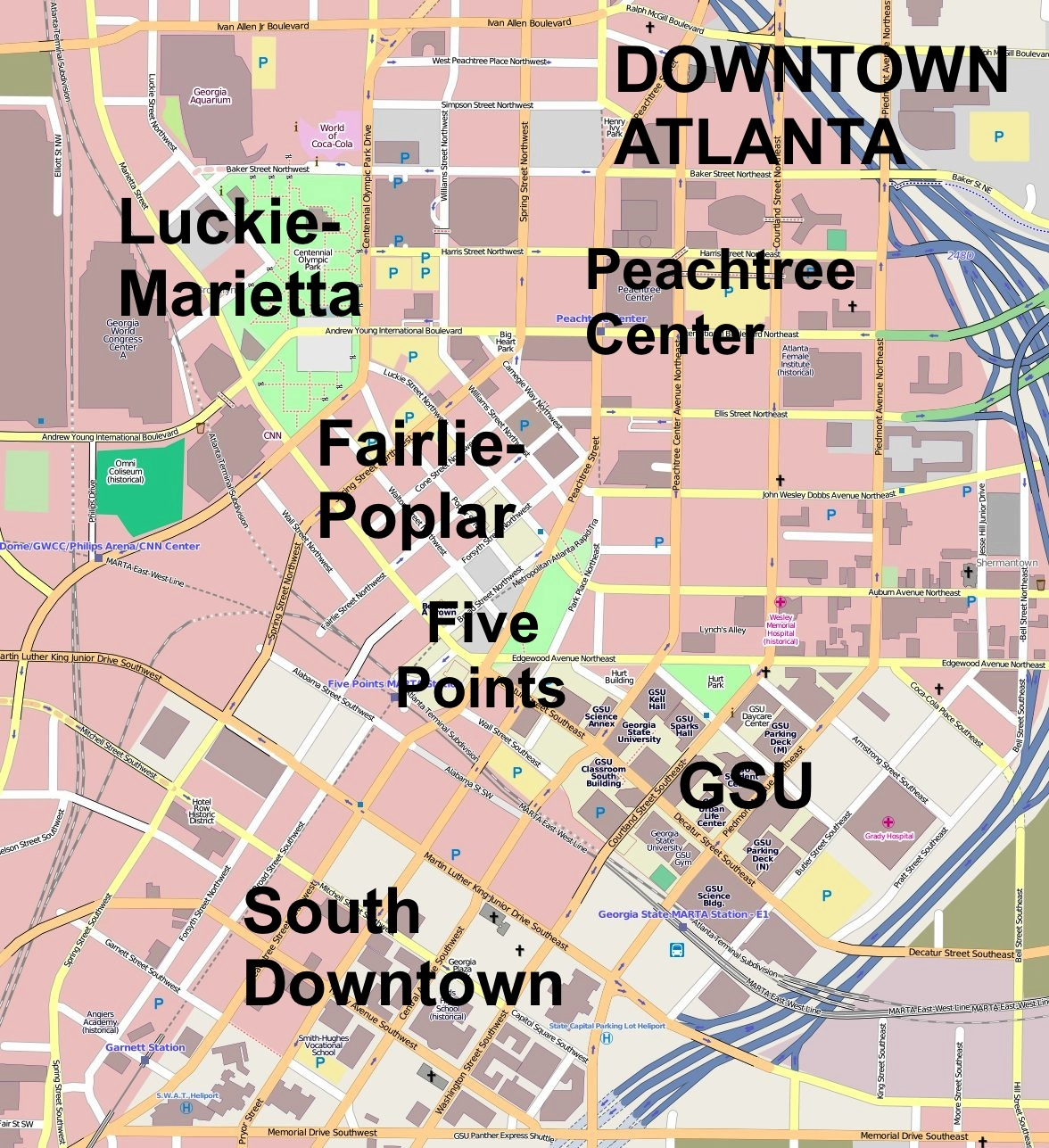
- Location within Downtown Atlanta Location within Atlanta Location within Georgia Location within the United States
- Location: Atlanta, Georgia, United States
- Coordinates: 33°45′8″N 84°23′31″W
- Architect: A. Ten Eyck Brown, Willis F. Denny
- Architectural style: Art Deco, Art Moderne, Italian Renaissance revival, Neoclassical Revival
- NRHP reference No.: 100005409
- Added to NRHP: August 6, 2020

The Whitehall Street Retail Historic District is a historic district in Atlanta, Georgia, United States. The district is centered on Peachtree Street and Martin Luther King Jr. Drive and includes Broad, Forsyth, and Mitchell Streets. It was added to the National Register of Historic Places in 2020.

== History ==
The name of the historic district comes from a previous name for Peachtree Street, one of the main roads in Atlanta. Since early in the city's history, this corridor of Whitehall Street was considered a major retail center, with the Atlanta Preservation Center calling it "Atlanta's commercial and retail core." In the Antebellum era, the area was also the site of the city's slave market. In 1907, the M. Rich Building was completed, and during the early 1900s, many notable companies operated in this district, including Rich's, H. L. Green, Kress, and McCrory's. The district is also notable for the sit-ins that occurred there during the civil rights movement of the 1960s.

In April 2019, the district was added to Georgia's register of historic places, and on August 6, 2020, it was added to the National Register of Historic Places. According to the Atlanta Preservation Center, the district showcases architectural styles including Art Deco, Art Moderne, Italian Renaissance Revival, and Neoclassical Revival, with notable architects A. Ten Eyck Brown and Willis F. Denny contributing to the district.

== See also ==
- National Register of Historic Places listings in Fulton County, Georgia
- Historic districts in the United States
