= Thomas P. Arnold House =

Historic house in Georgia, United States

- U.S. National Register of Historic Places
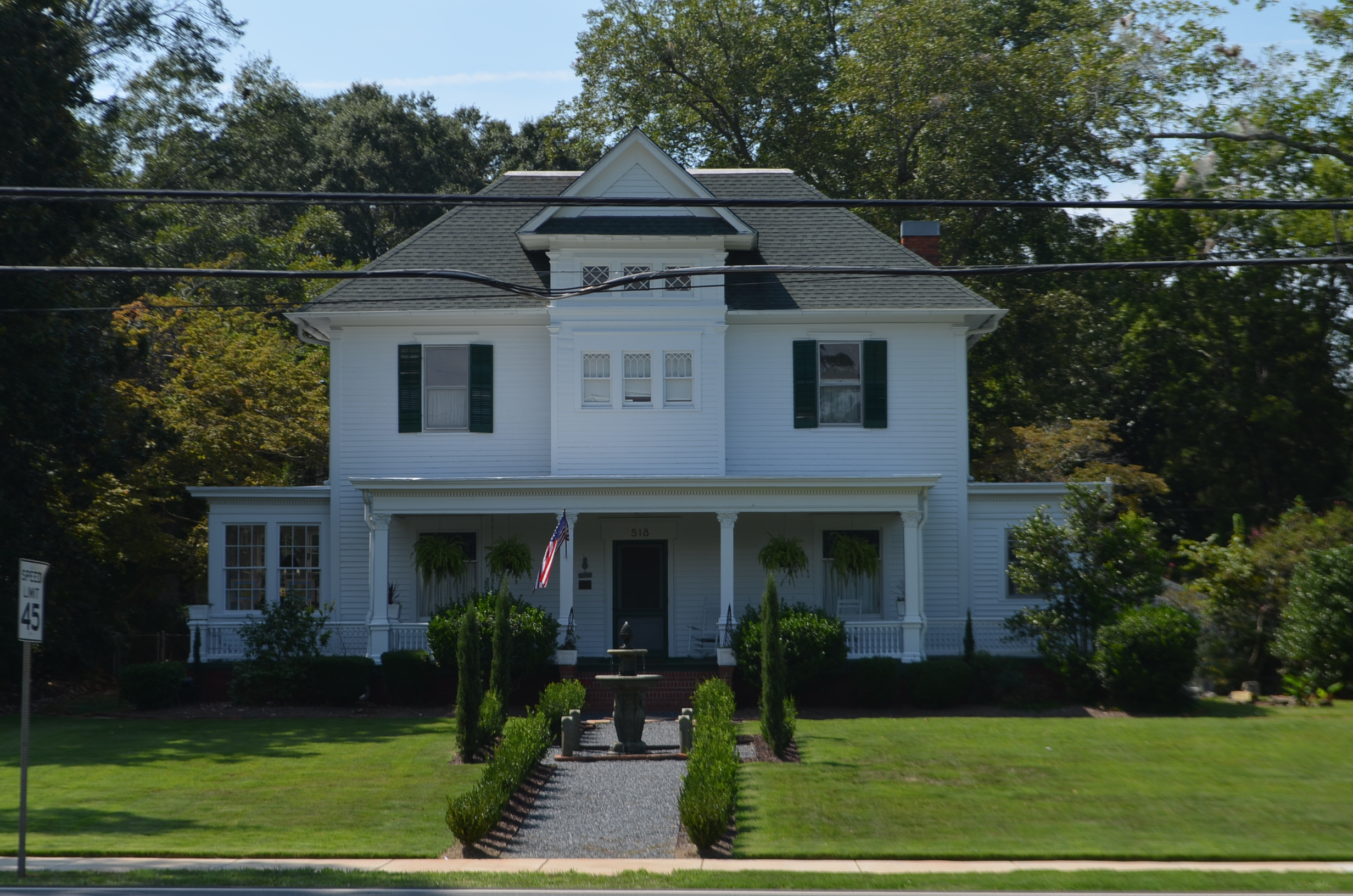
- Thomas P. Arnold House (2014)

- Location within Metro Atlanta Location within Georgia Location within the United States
- Location: 518 South Main Street; Palmetto, Georgia, United States
- Coordinates: 33°30′40″N 84°40′18″W
- Built: 1906
- Architect: Butt & Morris
- Architectural style: Classical Revival; American Craftsman
- NRHP reference No.: 84001074
- Added to NRHP: May 10, 1984

The Thomas P. Arnold House is a historic house in Palmetto, Georgia, United States. Built in 1906, the property was listed on the National Register of Historic Places in 1984.

== History ==
The building was constructed in 1906 in the city of Palmetto, Georgia. The house served as the residence for the mayor of Palmetto, Thomas P. Arnold, and after his death, the residence of his son, Thomas P. Arnold, Jr., who also served as mayor of Palmetto. The architectural style of the house incorporates elements of the American Craftsman and Classical Revival styles. The house was designed by the Atlanta-based architectural firm of Butt & Morris. The building was added to the National Register of Historic Places on May 10, 1984.

== See also ==
- National Register of Historic Places listings in Fulton County, Georgia
