= Fairburn Commercial Historic District =

- U.S. National Register of Historic Places
- U.S. Historic district
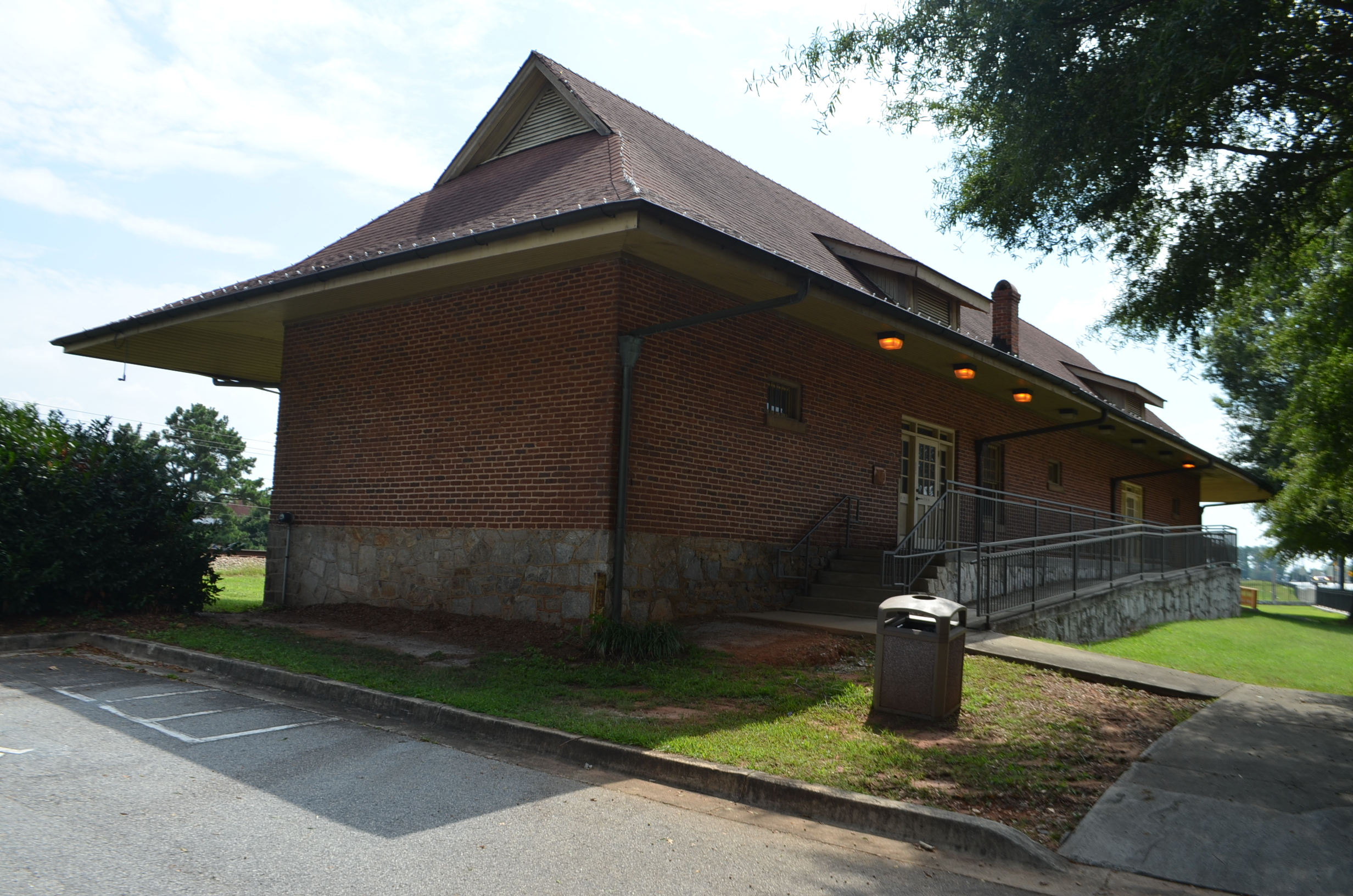
- The former Atlanta and West Point Railroad station within the district.

- Location within Georgia
- Location: Roughly along W. Broad St. and RR tracks between Smith and Dodd Sts., Fairburn, Georgia
- Area: 12 acres (4.9 ha)
- Architect: Lipham, Charles
- Architectural style: Classical Revival, Italianate, Commercial Style
- NRHP reference No.: 88002015
- Added to NRHP: October 20, 1988

The Fairburn Commercial Historic District is a historic district in Fairburn, Georgia. It consists of 17 buildings and three other structures, and was added to the National Register of Historic Places on October 20, 1988.

== History and description ==
In 1871 Fairburn was selected as the new county seat of the former Campbell County, Georgia when its original seat Campbellton, Georgia refused to allow the Atlanta and West Point Railroad build their main line through the community in the 1850s. Today, this line is part of the CSX A&WP Subdivision.

The primary road through the district is U.S. Route 29/GA 14 (Broad Street), which passes two cemeteries and the city police headquarters on the northwest side before entering downtown, through the district which includes the former Atlanta and West Point Railroad stations on both corners of Georgia State Route 92. The station on the southeast corner was for passengers while the station near the southwest corner was for freight service. From there, SR 92 joins US 29/SR 14 in a concurrency until it reaches the intersection with Georgia State Route 138 and turns northeast towards Campbellton and even Roswell.

Three low bridges for the railroad line run parallel to US 29. The bridge over Smith Street survives to this day, but was abandoned when the intersection with US 29 and Smith Street north of the tracks were leveled out, then filled in with dirt. A 2022 construction project converted the bridge into a pedestrian bridge with staircases and ramps for the disabled leading to the south side of US 29. The bridges over Campellton Street (GA 92) and Cole Street continue to operate.

== See also ==
- National Register of Historic Places listings in Fulton County, Georgia
