= Isaac Roberts House =

Historic house in Georgia, United States

- U.S. National Register of Historic Places
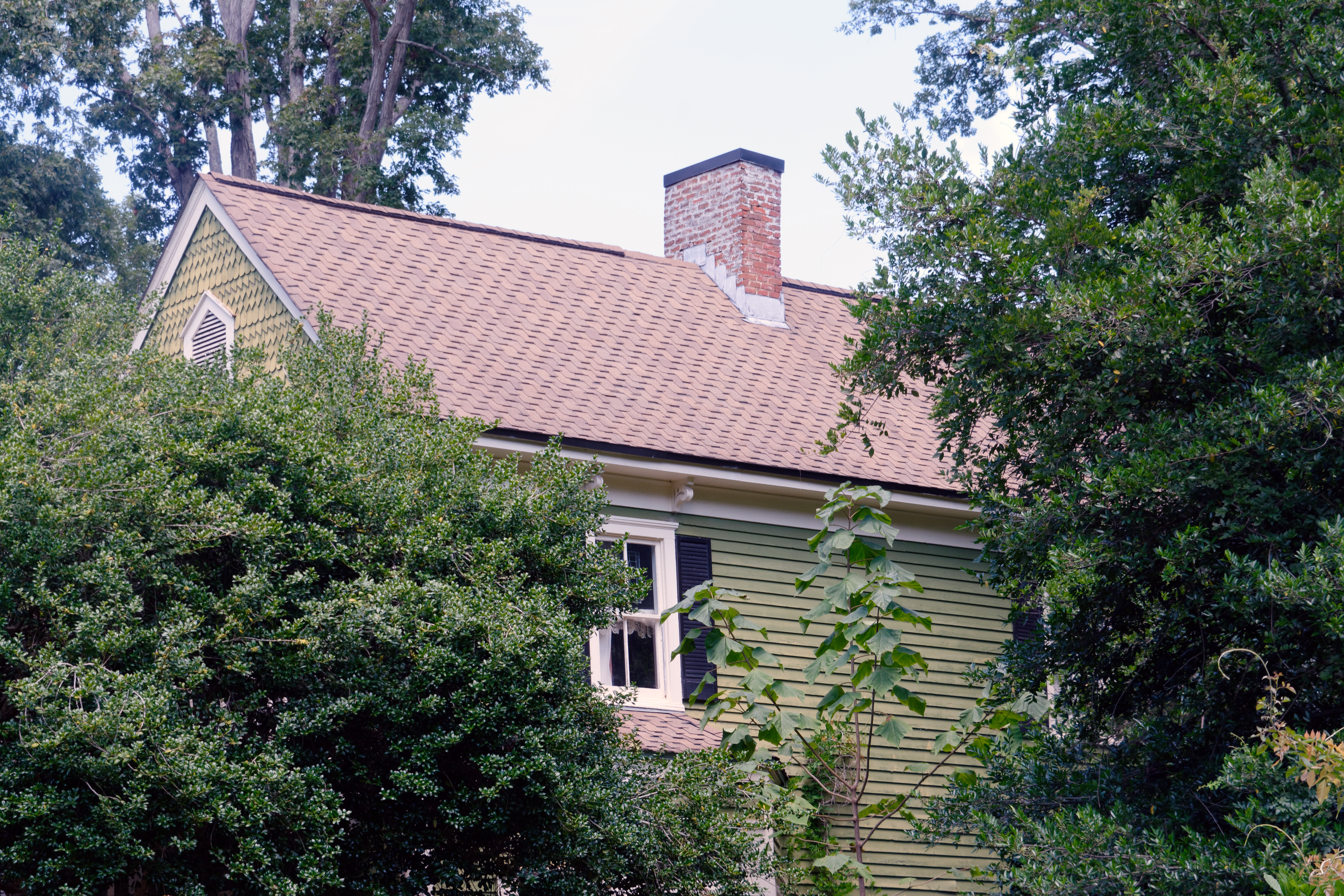
- Back side of the house, 2017

- Location within Metro Atlanta Location within Georgia Location within the United States
- Location: 9725 Roberts Dr., Sandy Springs, Georgia
- Coordinates: 34.0032°N 84.3486°W
- Area: 2.8 acres (1.1 ha)
- Built: 1894
- Architect: Roberts, Isaac
- Architectural style: Gabled-Wing type
- NRHP reference No.: 08000262
- Added to NRHP: April 10, 2008

The Isaac Roberts House is an historic house in Sandy Springs, Georgia.

== Location ==
It is located at 9725 on Roberts Drive in Sandy Springs, Fulton County, Georgia, north of Atlanta.

== History ==
The house was built in 1894 for Isaac Roberts, chief engineer for the Roswell Railroad and later founder of the Roswell Bank. It spans 2,730 square feet and contains two stories, four bedrooms, two bathrooms, two parlors, and seven fireplaces.

In 1961, the property was purchased by Ruby and Lloyd Pittman, who are the current owners.

It has been listed on the National Register of Historic Places since April 10, 2008.
