= Piedmont Avenue (Atlanta) =

Avenue in Atlanta, Georgia, US

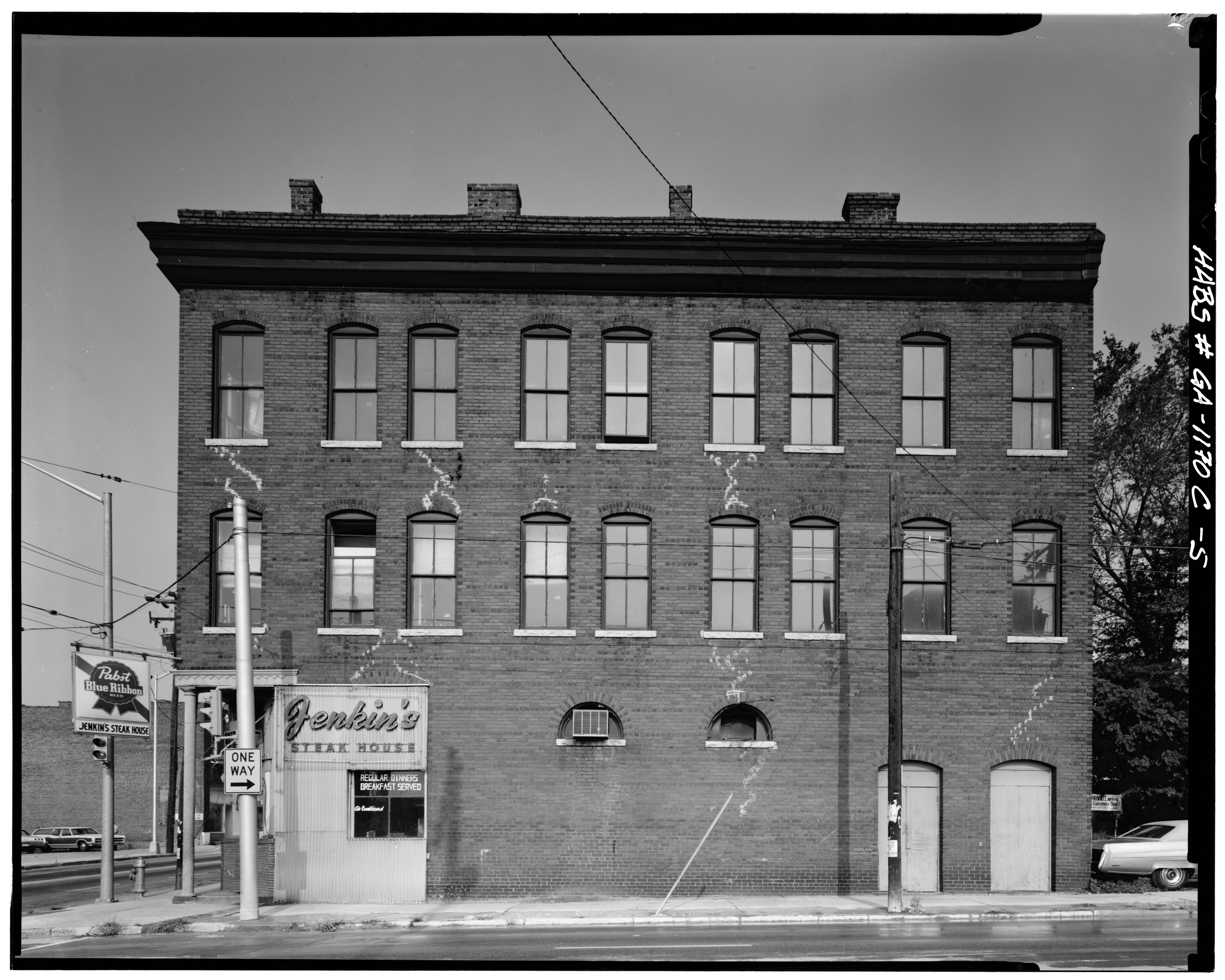
Rucker Building, 160 Auburn Ave. at Piedmont Ave., Sweet Auburn

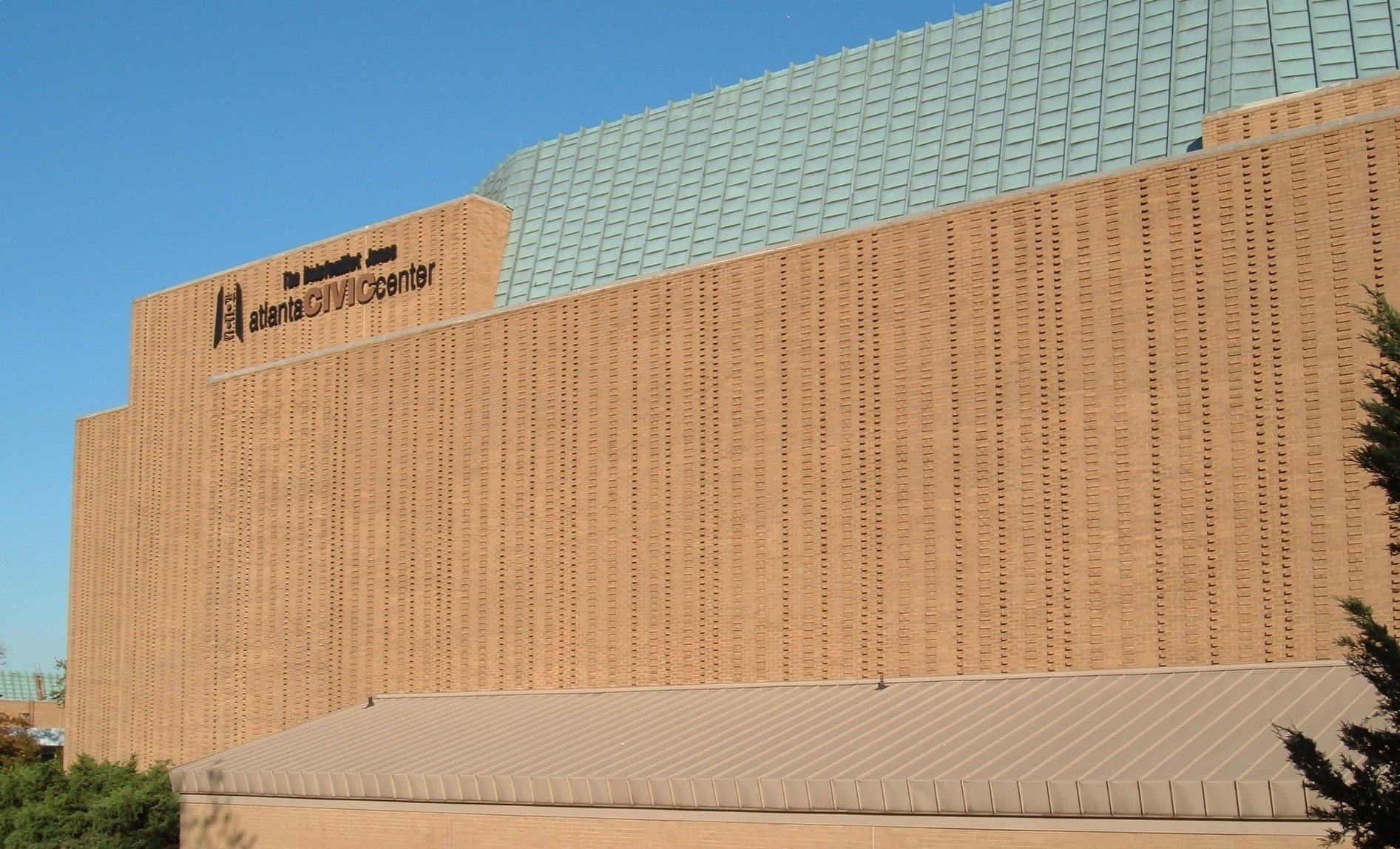
Atlanta Civic Center

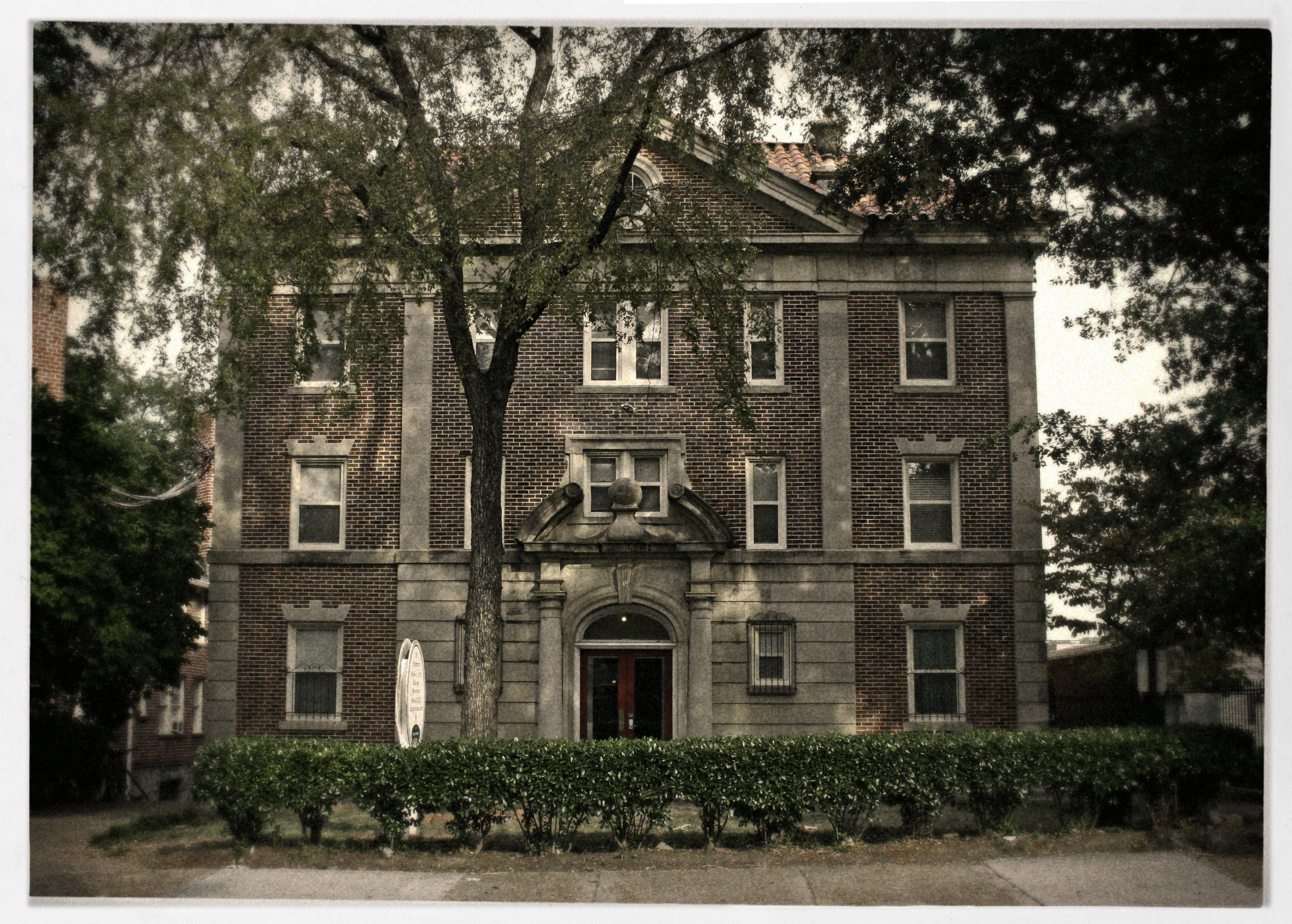
705 Piedmont Ave., Historic Midtown, listed on the National Register

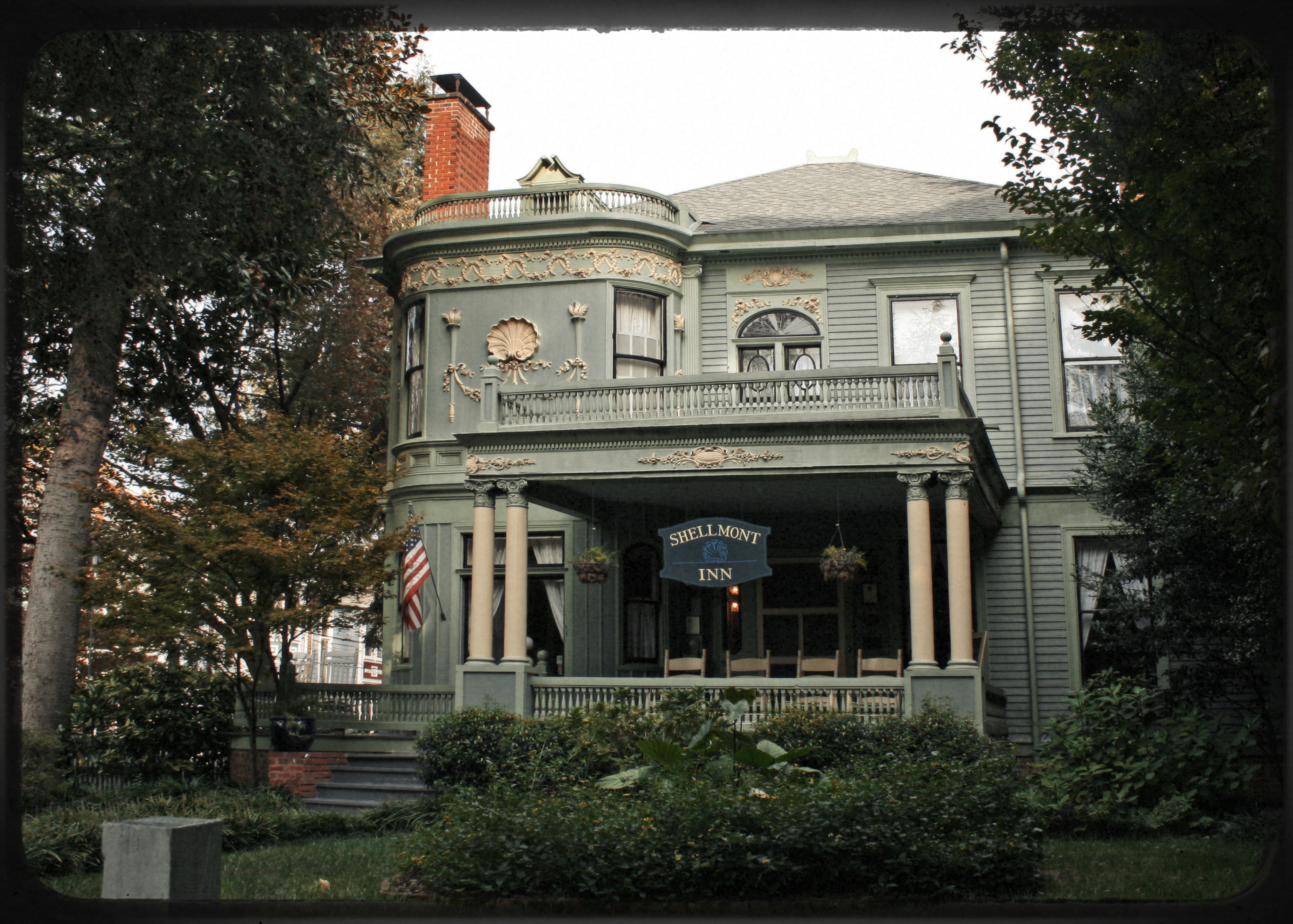
The William P. Nicolson House Shellmont Inn at 821 Piedmont Ave., Historic Midtown

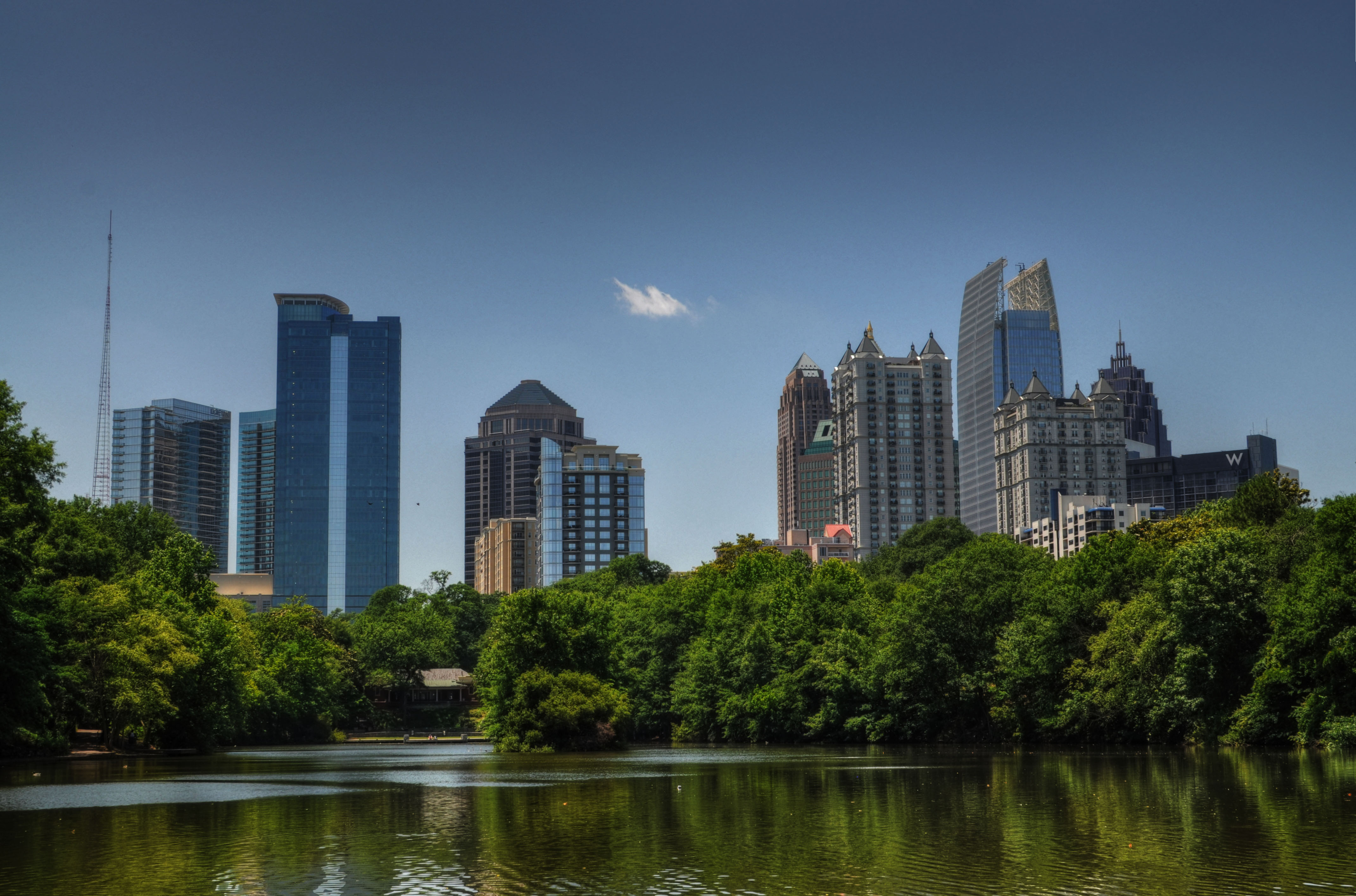
Piedmont Park

Piedmont Avenue is a major thoroughfare in Atlanta, beginning in Downtown Atlanta and ending at its continuation as Piedmont Road (Georgia State Route 237) just before crossing under Interstate 85. Along the way, Piedmont Avenue passes through Midtown Atlanta where several historic properties are located on the street.

== History ==
Piedmont Avenue was originally called Calhoun Street. As of 1872, Calhoun Street reached north to Seventh Street in today's Midtown. For the 1895 Cotton States Expo, in order to connect downtown to the exposition grounds at Piedmont Park, Plaster's Bridge Road south of 10th street was rerouted to connect to an extension of Calhoun Street, and all of this new through street was renamed Piedmont Avenue.

== Route ==
=== Downtown, SoNo and Old Fourth Ward ===
Piedmont Avenue Southeast begins at the Georgia State Capitol in Downtown Atlanta at Martin Luther King, Jr. Drive. It proceeds (one-way northbound) northeast, crossing under the Metropolitan Atlanta Rapid Transit Authority (MARTA) line at Georgia State station. It passes various Georgia State University buildings.

After crossing Edgewood Avenue, the street turns due north and becomes Piedmont Avenue Northeast, then passes Auburn Avenue, the historic heart of the black community. It then crosses the Downtown Connector freeway. At this point Piedmont Avenue forms the border between the SoNo neighborhood on the west and Old Fourth Ward on the east. In this section, Piedmont passes the Georgia Power headquarters, Renaissance Park, many gated apartment communities and several newer high-rise residential buildings, and the Atlanta Civic Center, former site of the Buttermilk Bottom slum.

=== Midtown ===
Passing North Avenue and Ponce de Leon Avenue, Piedmont enters Midtown Atlanta, first through the NRHP-listed Historic Midtown, known for its bungalow houses. In Historic Midtown there are several historic properties of note, including the Craigie House, 705 Piedmont and the William P. Nicolson House (now the Shellmont Inn) at 821 Piedmont Ave.

Piedmont and Tenth is considered the heart of the gay community in Atlanta, with several popular gay bars located here. North of 10th, the streetscape turns into mostly early 20th century multi-unit residential buildings. North of 12th Street, Piedmont Avenue borders Piedmont Park, to its east.

=== Ansley Park and Piedmont Park ===
After 14th Street, Piedmont Avenue becomes two-way (southbound traffic is forced to turn west on 14th Street). North of 14th, Piedmont forms the border between the posh, historic Ansley Park neighborhood on the west and Piedmont Park, the Piedmont Driving Club and the Atlanta Botanical Garden on the east. Then Piedmont crosses the BeltLine trail and Clear Creek at the northern tip of Piedmont Park and intersects with Monroe Drive, at the northwest corner of which the open-air Ansley Mall is located.

=== Piedmont Heights and Morningside/Lenox Park ===
After the intersection with Monroe, Piedmont Avenue forms the border between Piedmont Heights and Morningside/Lenox Park where the NRHP-listed Rock Spring Presbyterian Church is located. It intersects Cheshire Bridge Road and then changes its name to Piedmont Road and becomes Georgia 237, continuing north to Buckhead; at Roswell Road Piedmont Road becomes Blackland Road NW.
