= Rock Spring Presbyterian Church =

Historic church in Georgia, United States

- U.S. National Register of Historic Places
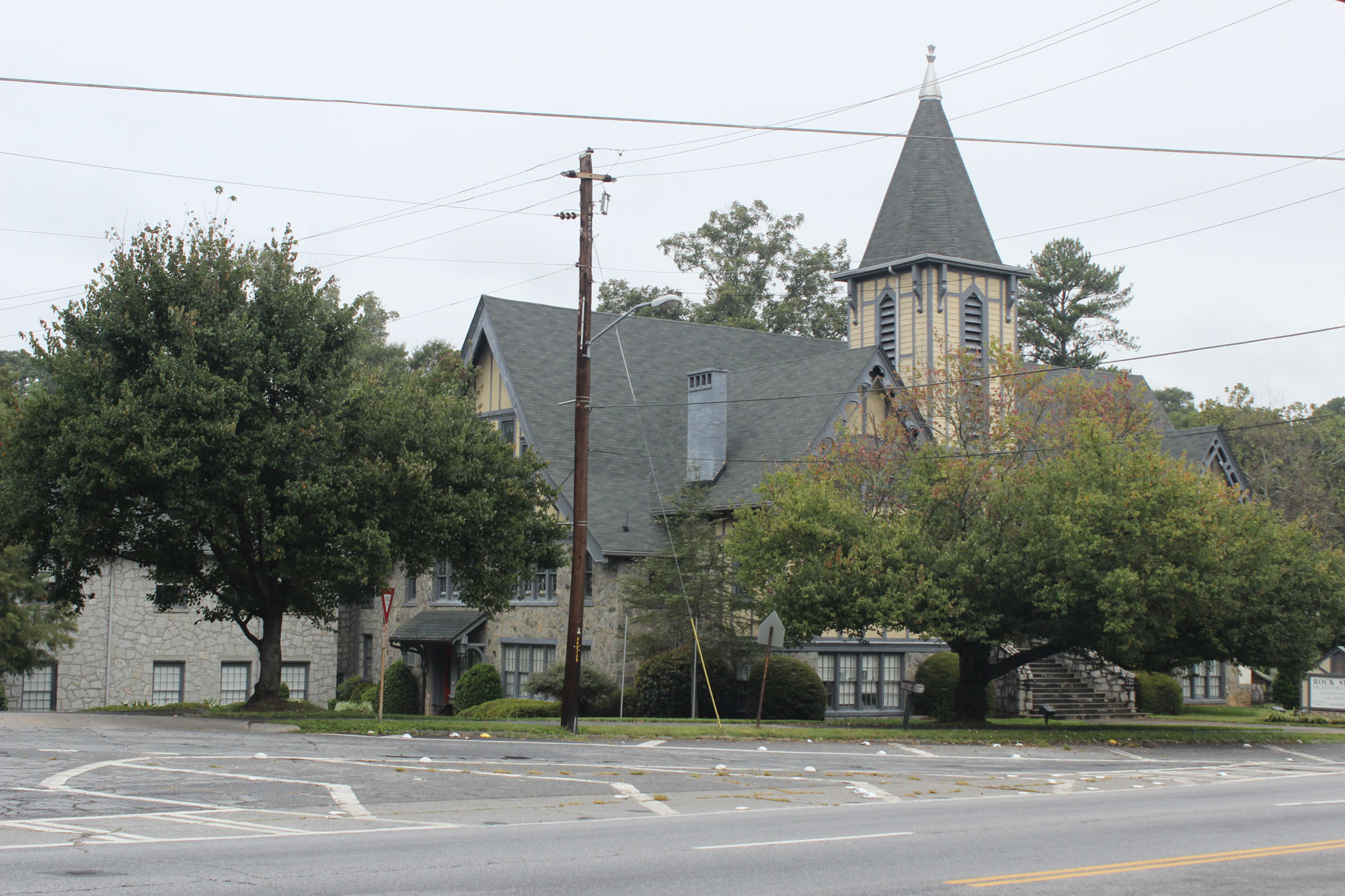

- Location within Atlanta Location within Georgia Location within the United States
- Location: 1824 Piedmont Avenue NE., Atlanta, Georgia
- Coordinates: 33°48′17″N 84°22′5″W
- Area: 1.5 acres (0.61 ha)
- Built: 1923
- Architect: Charles H. Hopson
- Architectural style: Tudor Revival
- NRHP reference No.: 90000804
- Added to NRHP: May 24, 1990

Rock Spring Presbyterian Church is a historic Presbyterian church at 1824 Piedmont Avenue NE in Atlanta, Georgia. Designed by Atlanta architect Charles H. Hopson, it was built in 1923 and additions were made to the rear in 1952 and in 1963. It is cross-shaped in plan and Tudor Revival in style.

It was added to the National Register in 1990. The listing included a manse building.
