= Knox Apartments, Cauthorn House and Peachtree Road Apartments Historic District =

- U.S. National Register of Historic Places
- U.S. Historic district
- Location within Atlanta Location within Georgia Location within the United States
- Location: 2214–2230 Peachtree Road; Atlanta, Georgia
- Coordinates: 33°48′54″N 84°23′31″W
- Area: 2 acres (0.81 ha)
- Built: 1921
- Architect: Richard Kennon Perry
- Architectural style: Colonial Revival
- NRHP reference No.: 98000248
- Added to NRHP: March 19, 1998

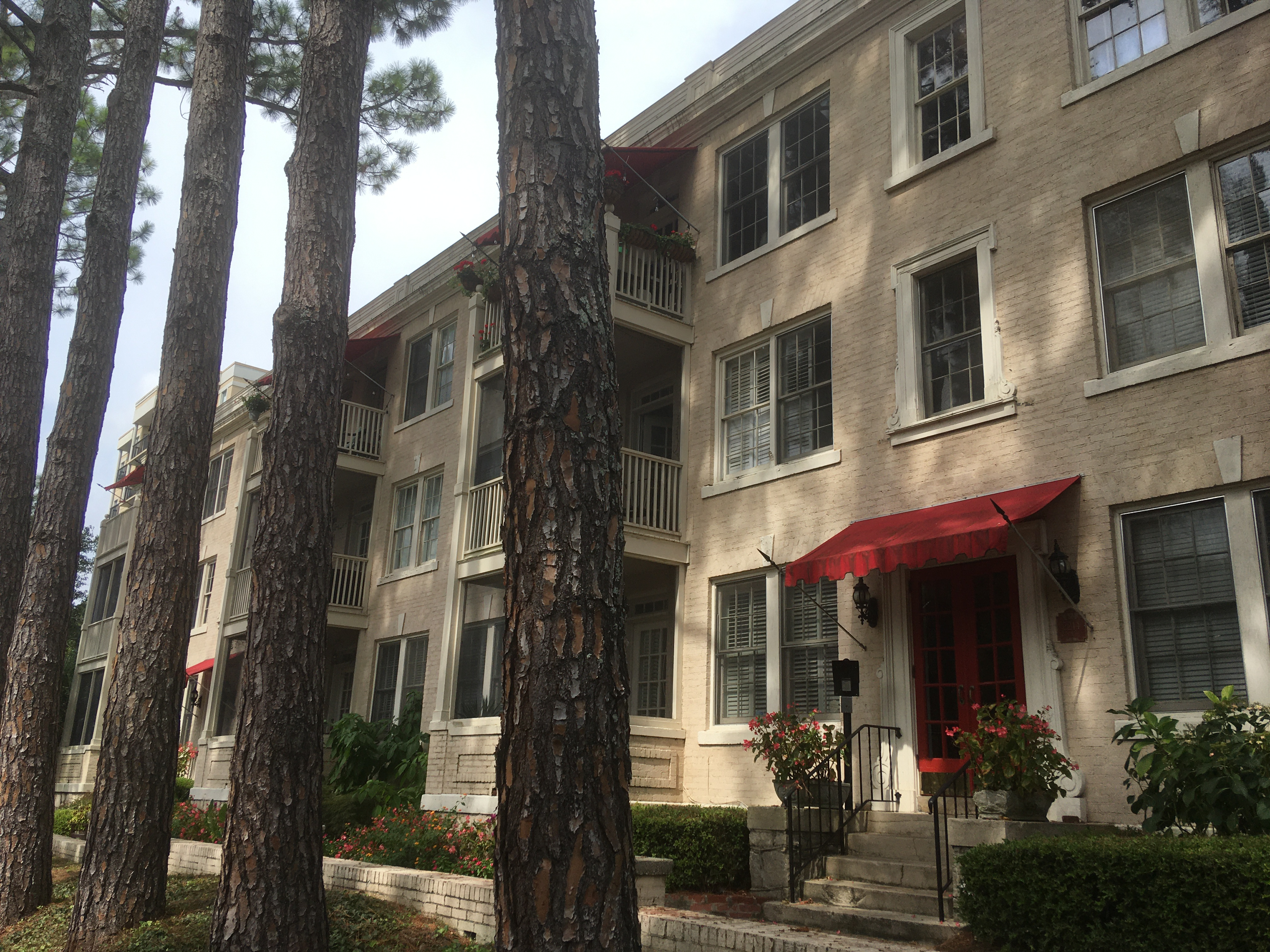

Knox Apartments, Cauthorn House and Peachtree Road Apartments Historic District is a group of three Colonial Revival apartment buildings, one house and an original koi pond. The complex is now known as Peachtree Commons. The complex was listed with the National Register of Historic Places on March 19, 1998, with listing number 98000248.
