= William Perrin Nicolson House =

Historic house in Georgia, United States

- William P. Nicolson House
- U.S. National Register of Historic Places
- Atlanta Landmark Building
- The Shellmont Inn Bed and Breakfast

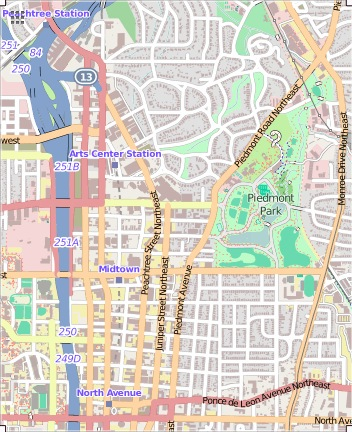
- Location within Atlanta Midtown
- Location: 821 Piedmont Ave., NE, Atlanta, Georgia
- Coordinates: 33°46′37.203″N 84°22′51.33″W
- Built: c. 1891
- Architect: Walter T. Downing
- Architectural style: Colonial Revival architecture
- NRHP reference No.: 77000432

Significant dates
- Added to NRHP: March 25, 1977
- Designated ALB: October 23, 1989

The William Perrin Nicolson House is a historic house built in 1891, located on Piedmont Ave. in Midtown Atlanta, northeast of downtown. The building was designated in 1989 as a historic building by the City of Atlanta, as William Perrin Nicolson House. The building was also listed on the National Register of Historic Places as the William P. Nicolson House.

== History ==
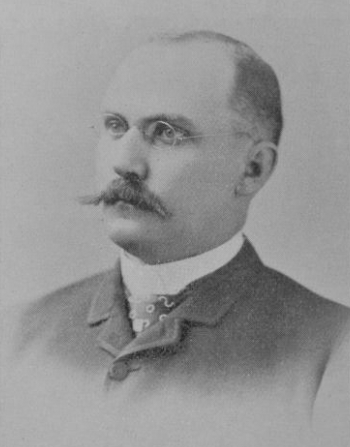
William Perrin Nicolson

The house was built in 1891 by surgeon William Perrin Nicolson as a wedding present for his bride, Carolyn Crane. The building was designed by regionally renowned master architect Walter T. Downing in the Eclectic Colonial Revival style. Downing designed many public buildings and churches, such as Sacred Heart Church (1877–98) but his most unusual and impressive works were his residential designs where his eclectic and individualistic style shines through.

The house was listed on the National Register of Historic Places in 1977, and is a City of Atlanta Landmark Building and Site (1989). One reason for its listing is that it is now a relatively rare surviving example of W.T. Downing's residential work, being one of only five of his houses in Atlanta still extant, and it is the only one reflecting the distinctive style that he developed in his designs commissioned in the 1890s.

The listing included two contributing buildings.

The property is documented by several interior and exterior photos in Downing's book titled Domestic Architecture.

William Perrin Nicolson died at the house on April 4, 1928, and the house remained in the Nicolson family until in 1982.

== Inn ==
The Nicolson House received the "Atlanta Urban Design Commission Award of Excellence for Historic Preservation and Adaptive Re-Use" from Atlanta Mayor Andrew Young in 1987. It is one of the featured properties in the 1991 book Classic Atlanta: Landmarks of the Atlanta Spirit. The property was operated as the Shellmont Inn Bed and Breakfast until 2016.

== In modern culture ==
It was featured in the 2015 movie in Chevy Chase's "Vacation" series, Vacation, as Clark and Ellen Griswold's personal bed and breakfast business.
