= Apartments at 22–24 Collier Road =

- Apartments at 22-24 Collier Road
- U.S. National Register of Historic Places
- Location within Atlanta Location within Georgia Location within the United States
- Location: 22-24 Collier Rd., Atlanta, Georgia
- Coordinates: 33°48′32″N 84°23′42″W
- Built: 1929
- Architectural style: Italian Villa
- NRHP reference No.: 07000938
- Added to NRHP: September 10, 2007

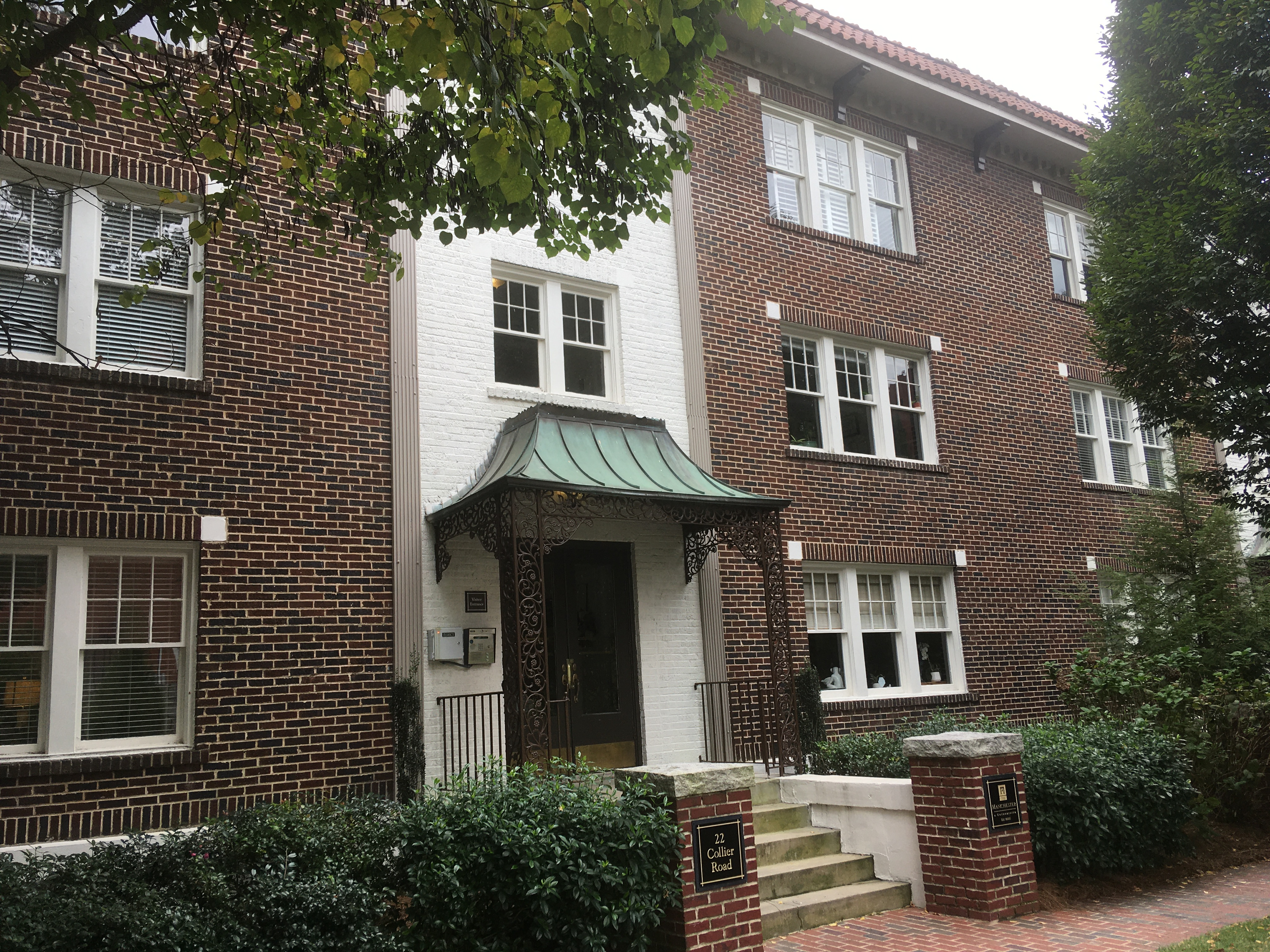

The Apartments at 22–24 Collier Road were built in 1929 by developers J.W. Jenkins and J.G. Crockett of the Anjaco Holding Corporation. The apartments are examples of Mediterranean Revival architecture, with classical details such as Doric columns and a central entrance.
