= Apartments at 2 Collier Road =

- U.S. National Register of Historic Places
- Location within Atlanta Location within Georgia Location within the United States
- Location: 2 Collier Rd., NW, Atlanta, Georgia
- Coordinates: 33°48′31″N 84°23′39″W
- Built: 1929
- Architectural style: Colonial Revival
- NRHP reference No.: 07000937
- Added to NRHP: September 10, 2007

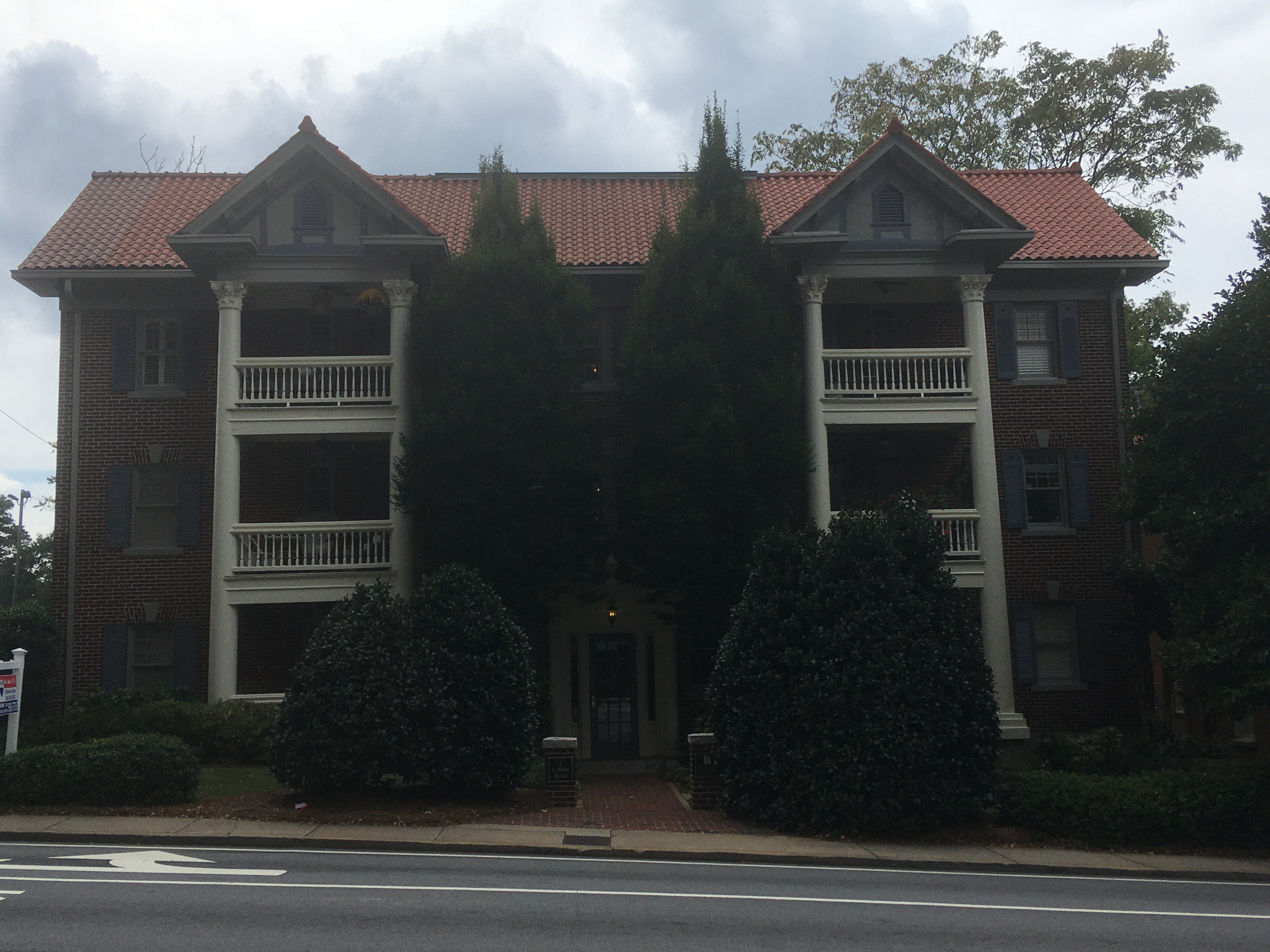

The Apartments at 2 Collier Road were built by developer Henry M. Rice in 1929 in Atlanta, Georgia. The apartments were built on lands formerly belonging to George Washington Collier. The Colonial Revival style buildings are of the "big house" style, giving the impression of a single large residence rather than an apartment building.
