= Finn (surname) =

The surname Finn has several origins. In some cases it is derived from the Irish Ó Finn, meaning "descendant of Fionn"; the byname means "white" or "fair-haired". In other cases it is derived from the Old Norse Finnr, a personal name sometimes derived from a byname, or else from compound names beginning with this word element. In other cases Finn is a German surname derived from an ethnic name referring to people from Finland. Notable people sharing the surname are listed below.

== Academics ==
- Chester E. Finn Jr. (born 1944) American professor of education, policy analyst and US Assistant Secretary of Education
- Frank Finn (1868–1932), English ornithologist
- Jeremy Finn, American psychologist
- Robert Finn (mathematician) (1922–2022), American mathematician
- Ronald Finn (1930–2004), English medical researcher

== Arts and entertainment ==
- Alec Finn (1944–2018), British-born musician
- Charlie Finn (born 1981), American actor and voice actor
- Chris Finn, Canadian stand-up comedian and writer
- Christine Finn (1929/30–2007), English actress
- Craig Finn (born 1971), American musician
- Dónal Finn (born 1995), Irish actor
- Henry J. Finn (1787–1840), American actor and writer
- Jason Finn (musician) (born 1967), American musician
- Jeffrey Finn (born 1970), American theatrical producer
- Jerry Finn (1969–2008), American record producer
- John Finn (born 1952), American actor
- Jon Finn (born 1958), American musician and guitarist
- Liam Finn (born 1983), Australian-New Zealand musician
- Mali Finn (1938–2007), American Hollywood casting director and drama teacher
- Mark Finn (born 1969), American fantasy and science fiction writer
- Mickey Finn (drummer) (1947–2003), English percussionist
- Mickey Finn (guitarist) (1947–2013), British rock guitarist
- Mickey Finn (Irish fiddler) (1951–1987), Irish fiddler
- Neil Finn (born 1958), New Zealand singer-songwriter
- Pat Finn (1965–2025), American actor
- Pat Finn (game show host) (born 1956), American television presenter, game show host and entrepreneur
- Paul Anthony Finn, Irish singer-songwriter, member of the 2000s indie rock quartet The Flaws
- Sean Finn (DJ) (fl. 2015–present), German DJ and electronic musician
- Simon Finn (musician) (born 1951), English musician
- Terry Finn (born 1955), American actor
- Tim Finn (born 1952), New Zealand singer-songwriter
- Tom Finn (fl. 1965–present), American musician, a founding member of the 1960s pop group The Left Banke
- Veronica Finn (born 1981), American singer
- Will Finn (born 1958), American animator, voice actor and director
- William Finn (1952–2025), American composer and lyricist
- James Finn Garner (born 1960), American author and satirist; "Finn" was his mother's maiden name, added to avoid confusion with James Garner.

== Business and politics ==
- Bernie Finn (born 1961), Australian politician
- Daniel E. Finn Sr. (1845–1910), American politician, lawyer and judge
- David Finn (1921–2021), American public relations executive, photographer, and historian of sculpture.
- Gilbert Finn (1920–2015), Canadian businessman and politician
- Howard Finn (1917–1986), American politician
- James Finn (1806–1872), British Consul in Jerusalem
- Elizabeth Anne Finn; wife of the above, James Finn
- Robert Finn (diplomat) (born 1945), former American ambassador to Afghanistan
- Robert Emmett Finn (1877–1951), Canadian lawyer and politician
- Simon Finn (politician) (born 1965), Australian politician
- Skip Finn (1948–2018), American politician
- Ted Finn (c. 1930–2007), Canadian lawyer and government official; first director of the Canadian Security Intelligence Service (CSIS)
- Walter L. Finn (1875–1936), American physician and politician
- William Francis Finn (1784–1862), Irish politician

== Military ==
- James Fynn (1893–1917), English recipient of the Victoria Cross
- John William Finn (1909–2010), American naval officer and recipient of the Medal of Honor
- Mickey Finn (inventor) (1938–2007), American inventor and designer of military weapons systems
- Sean C. Finn (1889–1921), Irish Republican Army commander

== Religion ==
- Francis J. Finn (1859–1928), American Catholic priest and author
- Richard Finn (born 1963), English priest, academic and theologian
- Robert Finn (bishop) (born 1953), American Roman Catholic prelate, former bishop of Kansas City, Missouri

== Sports ==
- Charles Finn (water polo) (1899–1974), American Olympic water polo player
- Danny Finn (born 1987), Candlepin Bowler
- Hubert Finn (1900–1952), Australian rugby league footballer and physician
- Jim Finn (born 1976), American professional football player
- Jimmy Finn (born 1931), Irish hurler
- Kate Belinda Finn (1864–1932), British chess player
- Kenny Finn (fl. 1950s and '60s), Irish-American soccer and Gaelic football player
- Micky Finn (footballer) (born 1954), English footballer
- Mike Finn (born 1981), Irish Australian rules footballer and basketball player
- Ron Finn (born 1940), Canadian ice hockey linesman
- Sean Finn (footballer) (born 1978), Irish retired footballer
- Steven Finn (born 1989), English cricketer
- Steven Finn (ice hockey) (born 1966), Canadian hockey player
- Tommy Finn, rugby league footballer who played in the 1950s and 1960s

== Other ==
- Adharanand Finn (born 1974), British author, journalist and podcaster
- Alfred C. Finn (1883–1964), American architect
- Camila Finn (born 1991), Brazilian fashion model
- Edmund Finn (1819–1898), Australian journalist and author
- Huckleberry Finn is one of the main characters in Mark Twain's novellas.
- Shirley Finn (1941–1975), Australian brothel owner who was murdered

== See also ==
- Henri Fin (born 1950), French cyclist
