= Richard Phillips =

Richard Phillips may refer to:

== Arts and entertainment ==
- Rich Phillips, American radio personality
- Richard Phillips (American painter) (born 1962), American artist
- Richard Phillips (English painter) (1681–1741), London portrait painter
- Sir Richard Phillips (publisher) (1767–1840), British author and publisher, founder of the Monthly Magazine
- Ricky Phillips (born 1952), American musician

== Sport ==
- Dick Phillips (1931–1998), American baseball player
- Richard Phillips (American high jumper) (born 1929), winner of the high jump at the 1949 USA Indoor Track and Field Championships
- Richard Phillips (hurdler) (born 1983), hurdler and sprinter from Jamaica

== Other people ==
- Richard Phillips (chemist) (1778–1851), British chemist
- Richard Phillips (merchant mariner) (born 1955), captain of the MV Maersk Alabama taken hostage by Somali pirates in April 2009
- Richard Phillips (MP) (c. 1640–1720), British Member of Parliament for Ipswich
- Richard Phillips (pastor) (1937–2013), Indigenous Australian boxer known as Dick Blair, later pastor and community leader
- Richard D. Phillips, American economist
- Richie Phillips (1940–2013), American executive director

== See also ==
- Richard Philipps (disambiguation)
- Richard Phillipps, pen name of Philip K. Dick (1928–1982)
