= Thomas Healey =

Thomas Healey may refer to:

- Thomas G. Healey (1818–1897), Atlanta real estate developer, politician, street railway entrepreneur and banker
- Thomas J. Healey (born 1942), lecturer at the Kennedy School Of Government
- T. J. Healey (c. 1866–1944), American horse racing trainer
