= Senator Finn =

Senator Finn may refer to:

- Skip Finn (1948–2018), Minnesota State Senate
- Walter L. Finn (1875–1936), Illinois State Senate
