= V. Kumar (professor) =

V Kumar is an academic who is a Professor of Marketing, and Goodman Academic-Industry Partnership Professor, Goodman School of Business, Brock University, On, Canada.

== Biography ==
Kumar was born in Chennai, India. His mother worked as a telephone operator and his father was a clerk in the Indian Railways. He entered the Indian Institute of Technology (IIT) of Madras. After graduating with a Bachelor of Technology (BTech), he continued his education in the MTech Program in Industrial Management at IIT-Madras. He then moved to the United States to do research on Quantitative Marketing in the PhD program in Marketing at the University of Texas at Austin.

He was the Salvatore Zizza Professor of Marketing, Tobin College of Business, St. John's University, NY, USA. Prior to that he was a professor at the faculty at the J. Mack Robinson College of Business at Georgia State University, where he held the Richard and Susan Lenny Distinguished Chair in Marketing.
