= Forsyth-Walton Building =

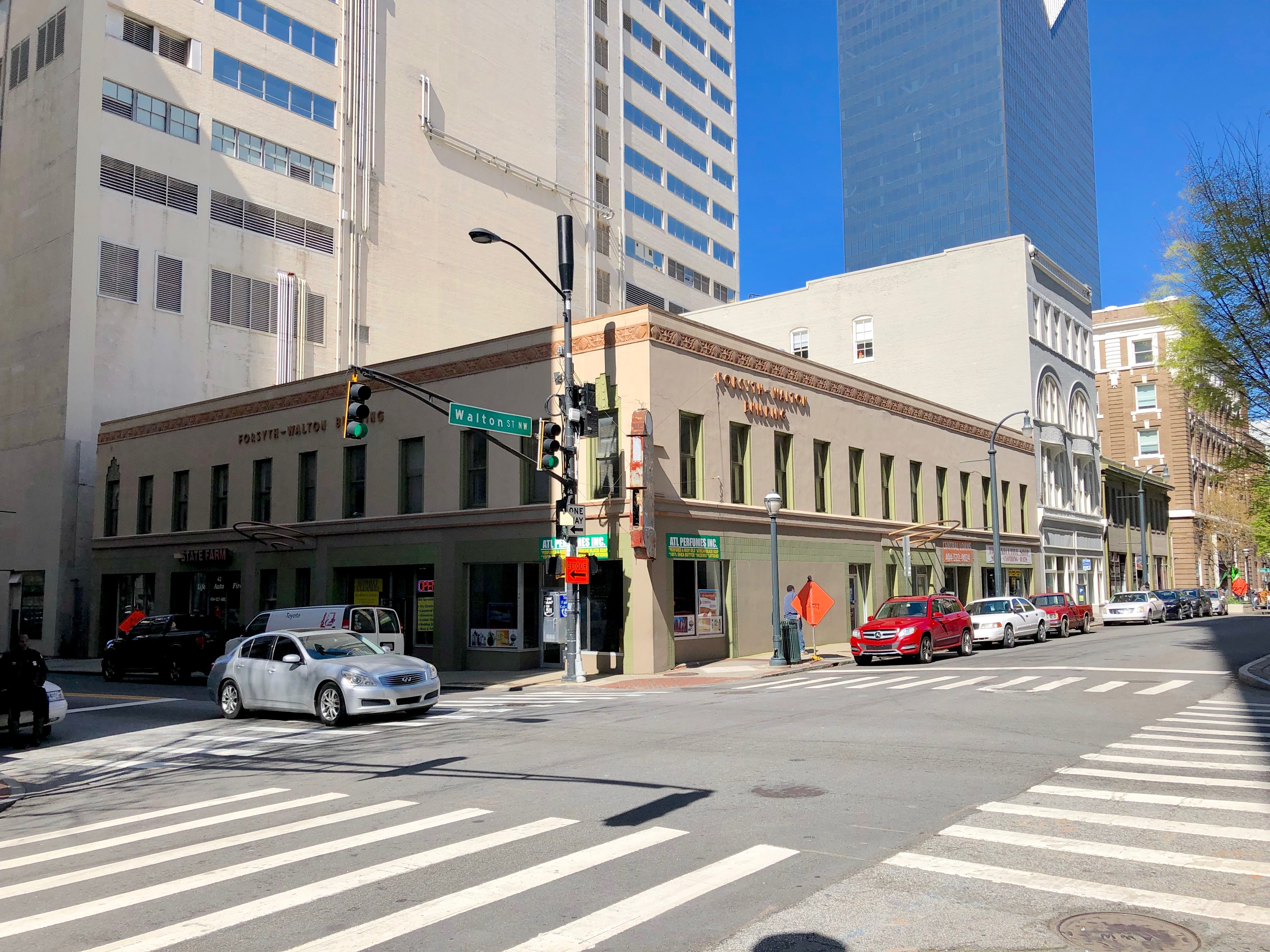
- Forsyth-Walton Building (2019).

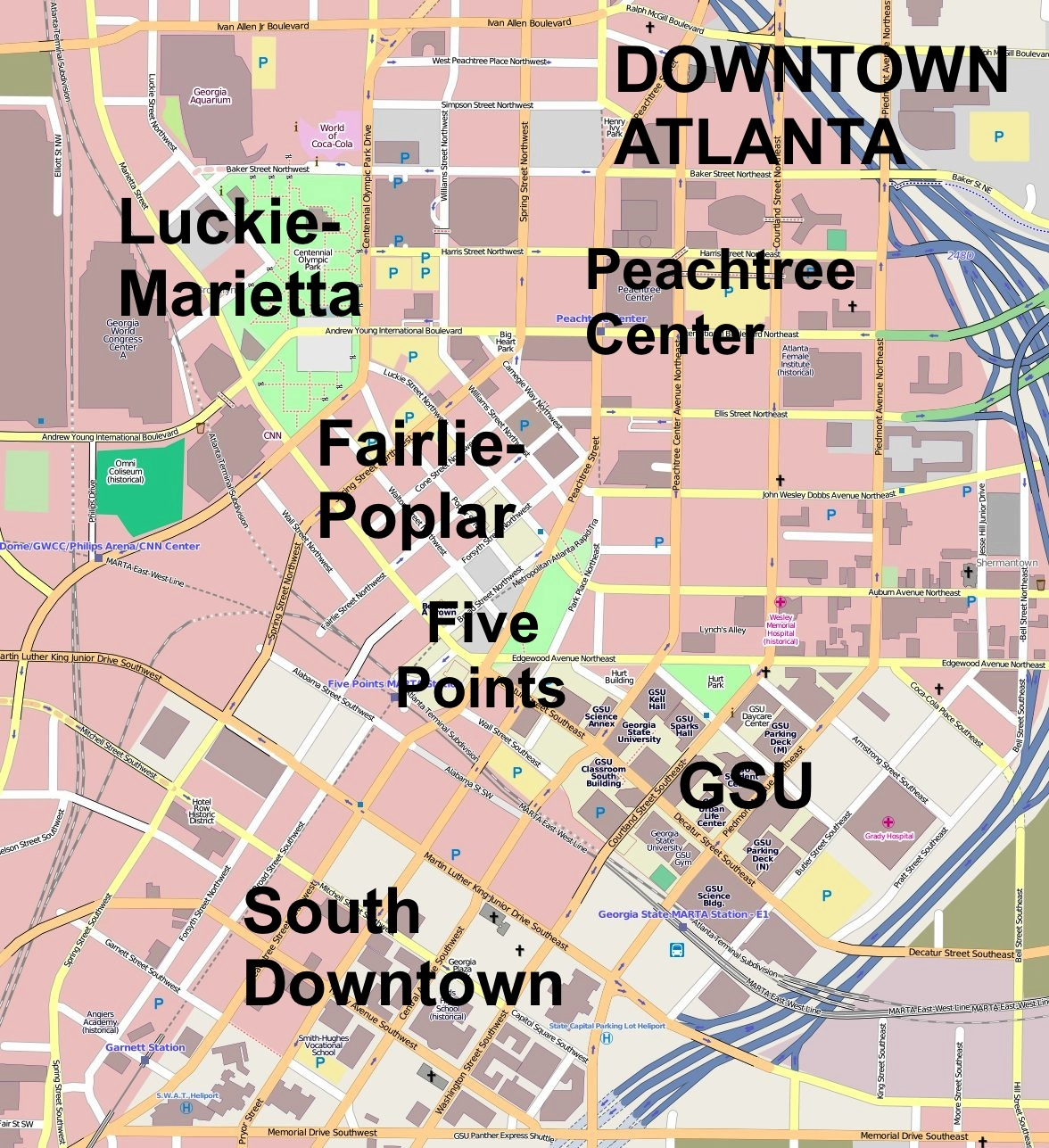
- Location within Downtown Atlanta Forsyth-Walton Building (Atlanta) Forsyth-Walton Building (Georgia) Forsyth-Walton Building (the United States)

General information
- Location: Fairlie–Poplar, Atlanta, Georgia, United States, 52 Walton Street NW
- Coordinates: 33.7560°N 84.3907°W
- Completed: 1900

Technical details
- Floor count: 2

The Forsyth-Walton Building is a historic building in the Fairlie-Poplar district of downtown Atlanta, Georgia, United States. Built in 1900 with renovations around 1936, it is one of the oldest commercial buildings in the area.

== History ==
The building was built in 1900 at the intersection of Forsyth Street and Walton Street in the Fairlie-Poplar district of downtown Atlanta. Around 1936, an Art Deco facade was added to the building. Today, the building stands as one of the oldest commercial buildings in the district.

In 2014, the building was placed on the Atlanta Preservation Center's list of most endangered historic places in Atlanta. In October 2015, it was announced that a nearby tech building had plans to demolish the building and repurpose the area. However, following public outcry, the developers instead announced plans to preserve the building and build an expansion on top of the existing structure. As of 2018, no further plans have been announced for the building.
