= Mack Robinson =

Mack Robinson is the name of:

- Mack Robinson (sprinter) (1914–2000), American sprinter
- J. Mack Robinson (1923–2014), Georgia businessman
