= W. D. Grant Building =

Historic building in Atlanta, US

- U.S. National Register of Historic Places
- U.S. Historic district – Contributing property
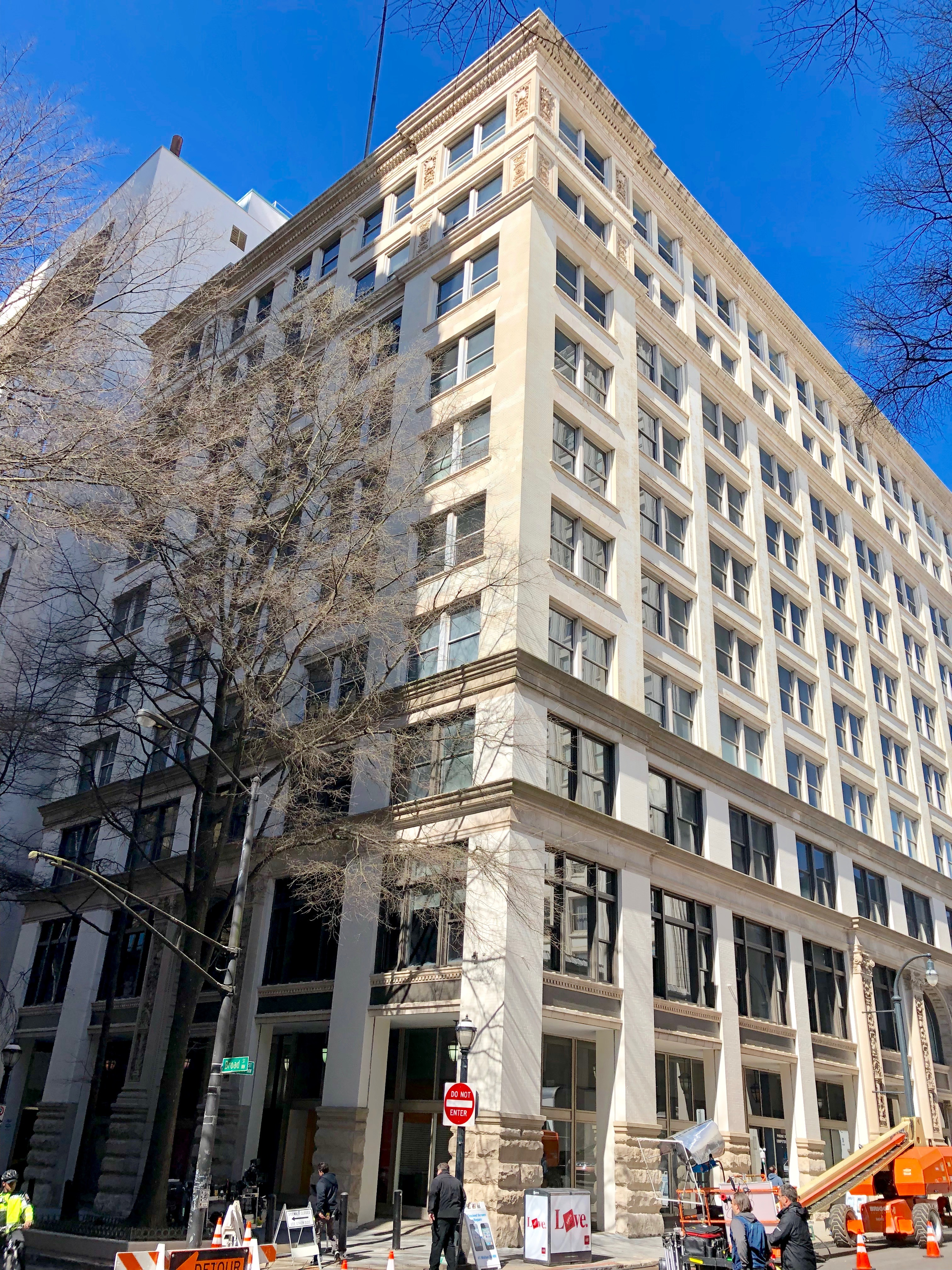
- W. D. Grant Building (2019)

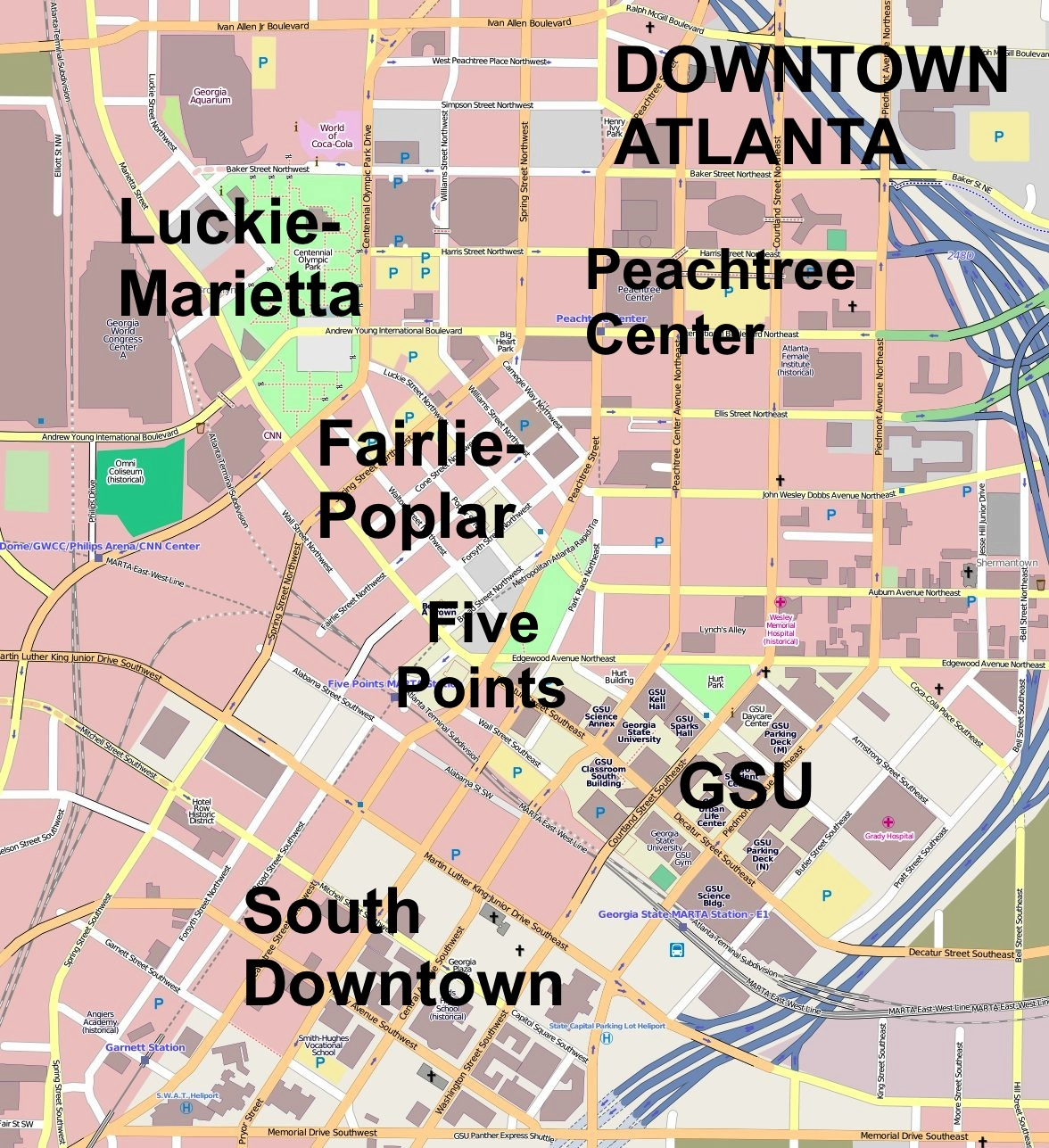
- Location within Downtown Atlanta Location within Atlanta Location within Georgia Location within the United States
- Location: 44 Broad Street; Atlanta, Georgia (U.S. state)
- Coordinates: 33°45′17″N 84°23′26.6″W
- Built: 1898
- Architect: Bruce & Morgan
- Architectural style: Chicago school
- Part of: Fairlie–Poplar Historic District (ID82002416)
- NRHP reference No.: 79003318

Significant dates
- Added to NRHP: January 8, 1979
- Designated CP: September 9, 1982

The W. D. Grant Building (also formerly known as the Prudential Building) is a historic building in Atlanta, Georgia, United States. Located in the Fairlie-Poplar district in downtown Atlanta, the building was built in 1898 and is among the oldest steel structure buildings in the Southeastern United States. The property was listed on the National Register of Historic Places in 1979.

== History ==
The building was completed in 1898 and is considered the second oldest steel structure building in the Southeastern United States. On January 8, 1979, the building was added to the National Register of Historic Places. In 1980, the building underwent an extensive renovation. In 2017, the building was purchased out of bankruptcy by two companies, Kramer Real Estate Investments and Four Mile Capital, for approximately $7.9 million. Following renovations, they sold the building in 2019 for approximately $13.6 million.

== Design and architecture ==
The building is ten stories and has an area of approximately 130,000 square feet. The building also has one floor beneath ground and contains four elevators. The architecture is an example of the Chicago school and features a curtain wall. The architects behind the building were Bruce & Morgan, who also designed the J. Mack Robinson College of Business Administration Building.

== See also ==
- National Register of Historic Places listings in Fulton County, Georgia
