= Healey Building =

- U.S. National Register of Historic Places
- U.S. Historic district – Contributing property
- Atlanta Landmark Building
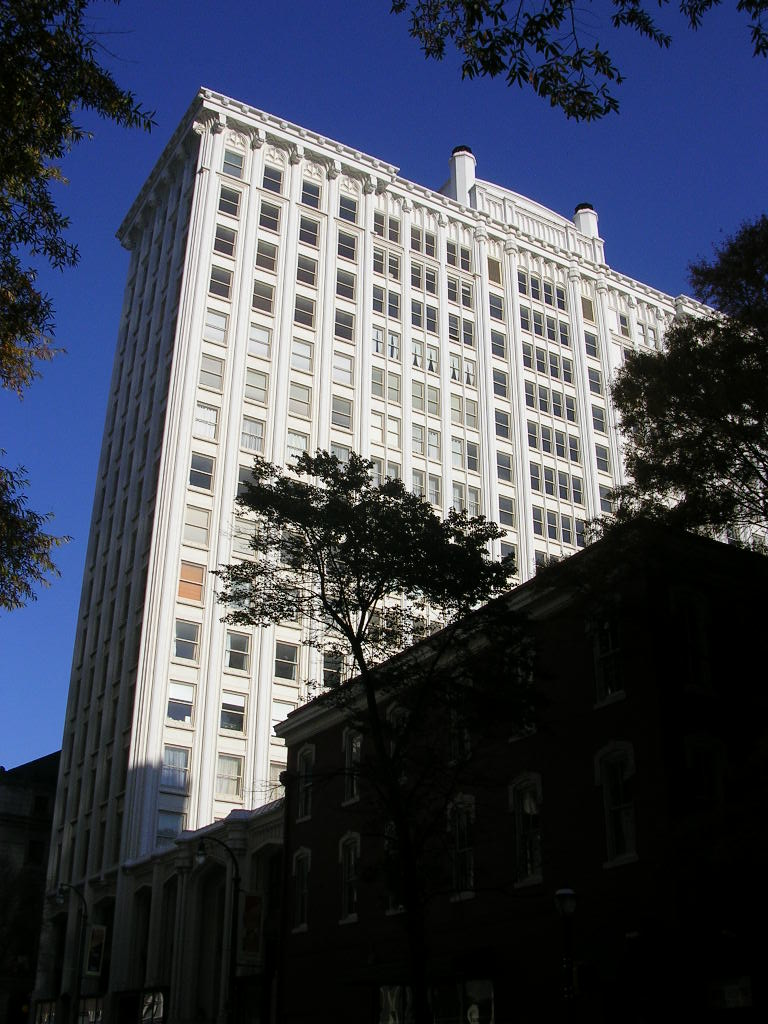
- Healey Building, West Tower

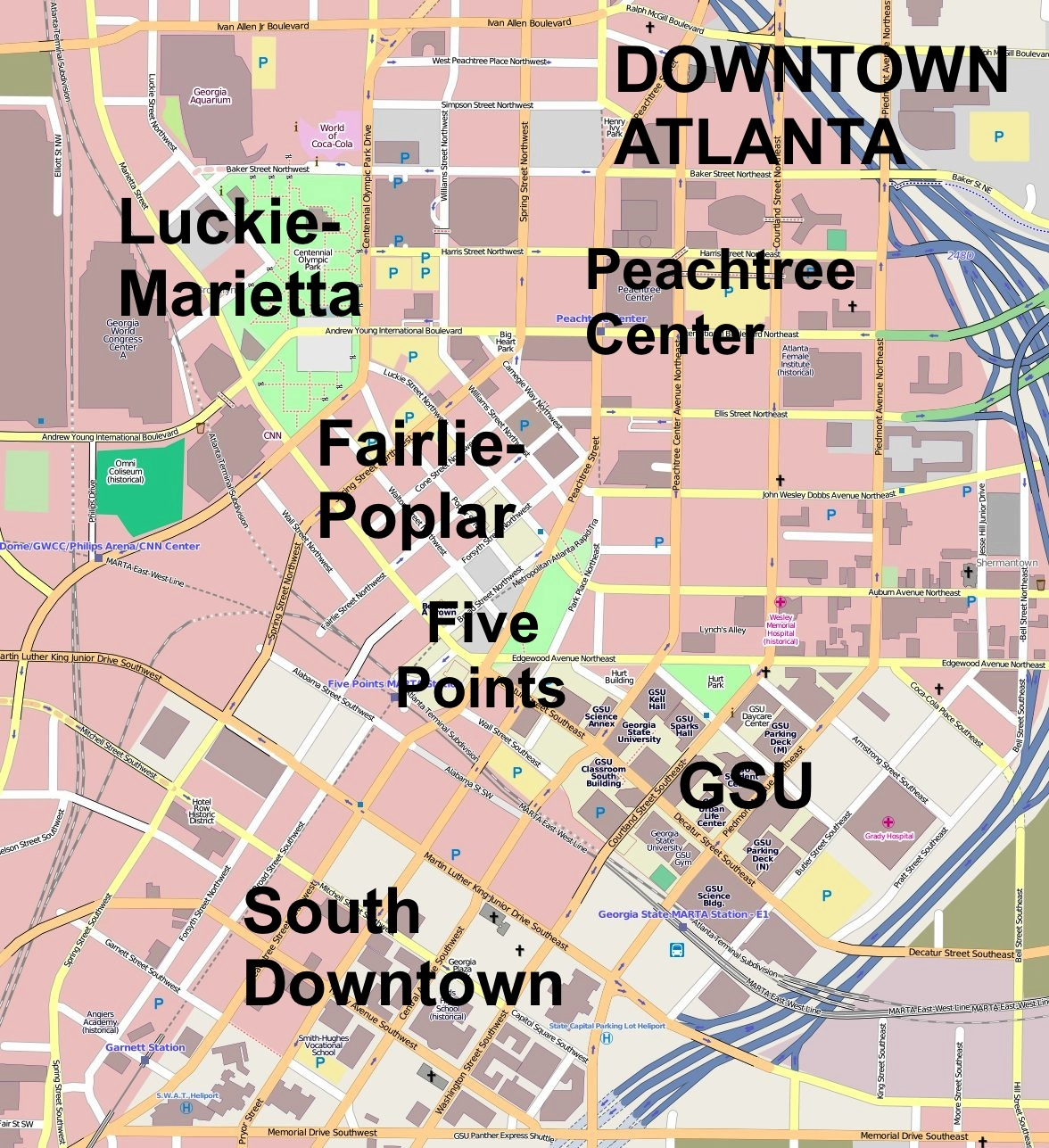
- Location within Downtown Atlanta
- Location: 57 Forsyth St., Atlanta, Georgia
- Coordinates: 33°45′22″N 84°23′23″W
- Area: less than one acre
- Built: 1913
- Architect: Morgan & Dillon; Walter T. Downing
- Architectural style: Late Gothic Revival
- Part of: Fairlie–Poplar Historic District (ID82002416)
- NRHP reference No.: 77000429

Significant dates
- Added to NRHP: August 12, 1977
- Designated CP: September 9, 1982
- Designated ALB: December 23, 1991

The Healey Building, at 57 Forsyth Street NW, in the Fairlie-Poplar district of Atlanta, was the last major skyscraper built in that city during the pre-World War I construction boom. Designed by the firm of Morgan & Dillon, with assistance from Walter T. Downing, in the Gothic Revival style, the 16-story structure was built between 1913-1914. It was originally planned with two facing towers connected by an atrium, taking up an entire city block. During construction, steelworker Billy Newburn fell to his death in 1913.The east tower along Broad Street was never constructed due to World War I and the subsequent death of owner William T. Healey (son of developer Thomas G. Healey) in 1920.

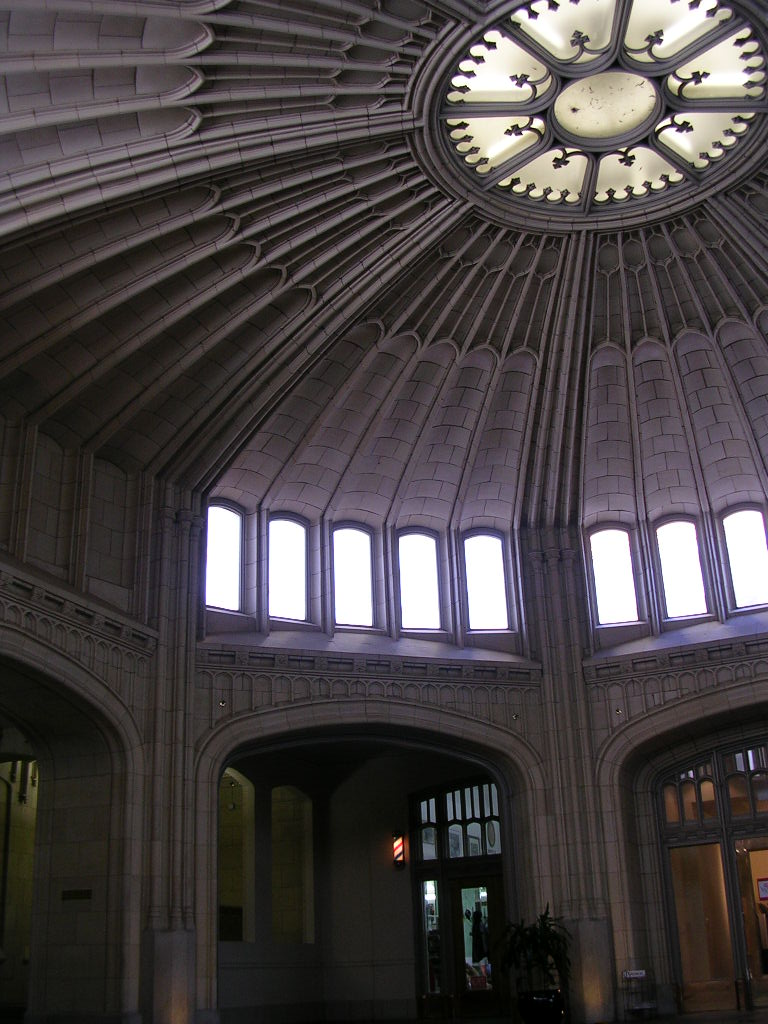
Healey Building, Atrium

The building remained in the Healey family until 1972. On August 8, 1977, it was listed on the National Register of Historic Places, and since 1987 it has enjoyed local landmark status. In 2001, the upper floors were converted into condominiums, while the lower floors continue to be the home of galleries, shops, and restaurants.
