= Fire Station No. 11 (Atlanta) =

- U.S. National Register of Historic Places
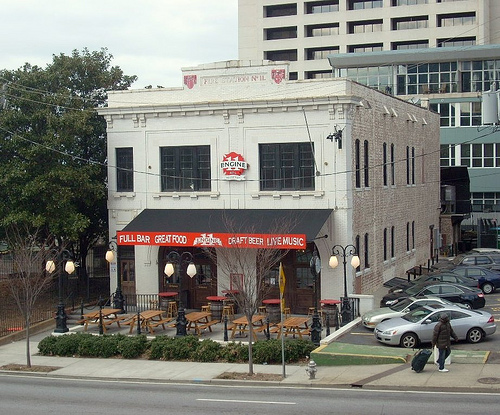
- Fire Station No. 11 in 2013

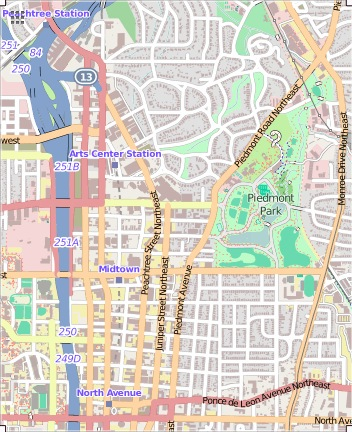
- Location within Atlanta Midtown Location within Atlanta Location within Georgia Location within the United States
- Location: 30 North Ave., Atlanta, Georgia
- Coordinates: 33°46′17″N 84°23′09″W
- Area: less than one acre
- Built: 1907
- Architect: Morgan & Dillon
- Architectural style: Beaux Arts
- NRHP reference No.: 80001073
- Added to NRHP: February 12, 1980

The Fire Station No. 11 in Atlanta, Georgia, at 30 North Ave., was built in 1907. It was listed on the National Register of Historic Places in 1980.

It was designed by architects Morgan & Dillon. It is a two-story brick building "with restrained Beaux-Arts detailing. The front (south) elevation is pierced by two Italianate-arched truck bays."

It was the first fire station to respond to the Winecoff Hotel fire in 1946.

The building had been renovated and for a brief period was called "Engine 11 Firehouse Tavern".

In 2014, Alan Clark Architects, LLC was asked by a restaurant group from New York City to assist with the re-imagination of the interior spaces of the historic building.

The redesign altered the 1907 masonry two story building into a high-end Caribbean restaurant, called “NEGRIL VILLAGE”. Alan Clark Architects, LLC designed the kitchen, and changed the second floor into a meeting room/party room by opening a wall and adding complementary wood paneling. The new work complemented existing trim and woodwork, and worked within the guidelines of the City of Atlanta's Urban Design Commission, and the Secretary of the Interiors Standards for Preservation, Section 106.
