= Israel Keech Tefft =

American writer and businessman

- Born: February 12, 1794; Smithfield, Rhode Island, U.S.
- Died: June 30, 1862 (aged 68); Savannah, Georgia, U.S.
- Resting place: Laurel Grove Cemetery, Savannah, Georgia, U.S.
- Spouse: Penelope Waite Sessions (1817–1862; his death)

Israel Keech Tefft (February 12, 1794 – June 30, 1862) was an American writer and businessman who was co-founder of the Georgia Historical Society in Savannah, Georgia.

== Life and career ==
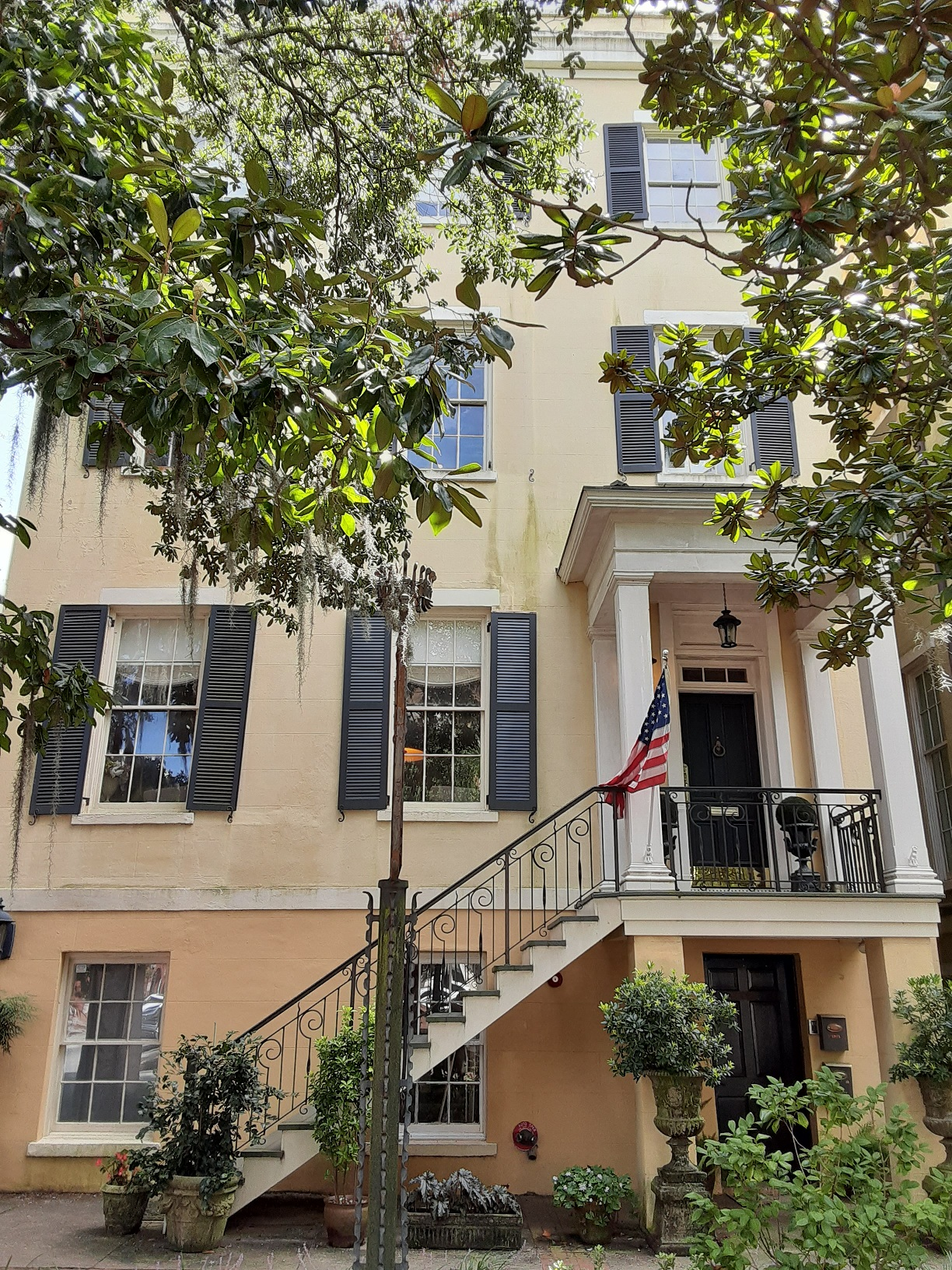
The former Tefft family home, at 1 West Jones Street in Savannah, Georgia

Tefft was born in 1794 in Smithfield, Rhode Island. His father died when Israel was around four years old, and his mother relocated so that he could be educated in Boston, Massachusetts.

In 1816, he relocated to Savannah, Georgia, and started a hardware business. A year later, he married Penelope Waite Sessions, a native of Thompson, Connecticut, and granddaughter of Darius Sessions, deputy governor of the Colony of Rhode Island and Providence Plantations. From 1849, the couple lived at the corner of Bull Street and West Jones Street in Savannah.

Tefft fell into heavy debt by December 1818, a month after becoming a father, having had several planned business transactions fail. The business folded during the Panic of 1819.

With his friend Henry J. Finn, Tefft became joint editor and manager of Savannah daily newspaper The Georgian and Evening Advertiser in 1821, albeit briefly. He sold his share in the business to George Robertson Jr., who restored the paper's name to The Georgian, and started a new career with the Bank of the State of Georgia in 1822. He was elected its cashier in 1848, and remained in the role until his death.

After departing his newspaper role, Tefft wrote the historical work the Native American. He followed it with The Remains of Henry Denison in 1823. The latter was due to appear as 56 pages within The Columbian Lyre: or Specimens of Transatlantic Poetry in 1828. It was to be published in Glasgow, Scotland, but was abandoned. It instead appeared in the literary periodical The Coronal, which was published in Greenock, Scotland.

Tefft was a first corporal with the Chatham Artillery; he resigned after losing out to William Turner for the role of fourth sergeancy.

Sometime between 1835 and 1844, Cornelius Ver Bryck painted an oil-on-canvas portrait of Tefft.

In 1839, Tefft co-founded the Georgia Historical Society, in which he became a close friend of Alexander Smets. Tefft possessed a large library of autographs and manuscripts, which he had begun around the age of 21. His collection of autographs was believed to have been one of the world's rarest. In 1867, William Gilmore Simms arranged a sale in New York City of Tefft's autograph collection for the benefit of his widow.

== Death ==
Tefft died in 1862, aged 68, having been ill for around three months. He was interred in Savannah's Laurel Grove Cemetery. His widow, who survived him by eleven years, was buried beside him. The couple survived each of their three children.
