= Sam Jones Methodist Church =

Church building in Cartersville, United States of America

- U.S. National Register of Historic Places
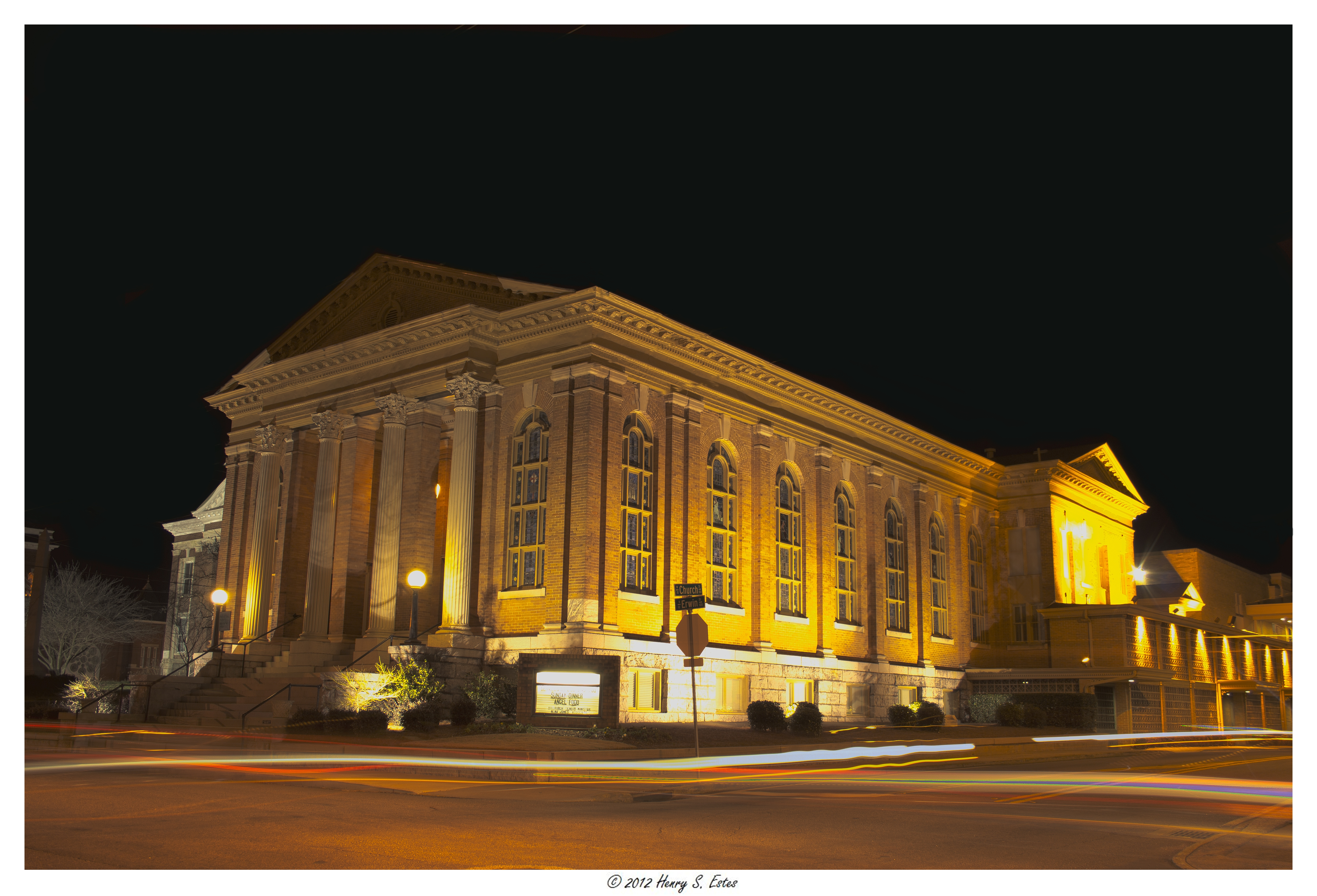

- Location within Georgia Location within the United States
- Location: 100 W. Church St., Cartersville, Georgia
- Coordinates: 34.1664°N 84.7977°W
- Area: 1.5 acres (0.61 ha)
- Built: 1906–1907
- Architect: Downing, Walter T.
- Architectural style: Classical Revival
- NRHP reference No.: 85001972
- Added to NRHP: September 5, 1985

The Sam Jones Methodist Church (formerly Sam Jones Memorial United Methodist Church) at 100 W. Church St. in Cartersville, Georgia was built in 1907. It was designed by Atlanta architect Walter T. Downing. It was listed on the National Register of Historic Places in 1985.

The church was deemed significant architecturally as a "fine example of a church built in the Classical Revival Style exemplified by the use of a full entablature and portico." It is also notable for its association with one of the county's oldest Methodist churches, and for its namesake Sam P. Jones. — a native of Oak Bowery, Alabama, who lived in Cartersville from the age of twelve and is buried in Cartersville—an evangelist who preached across the United States. After his sudden death during the construction of their new church, the Cartersville Methodist Episcopal Church South renamed itself in his honor.
