= Fulton County Courthouse (Georgia) =

- U.S. National Register of Historic Places
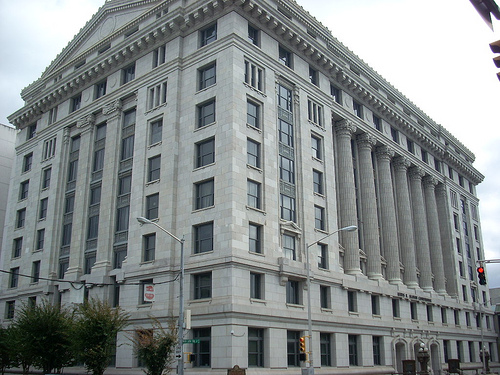
- The courthouse in 2009

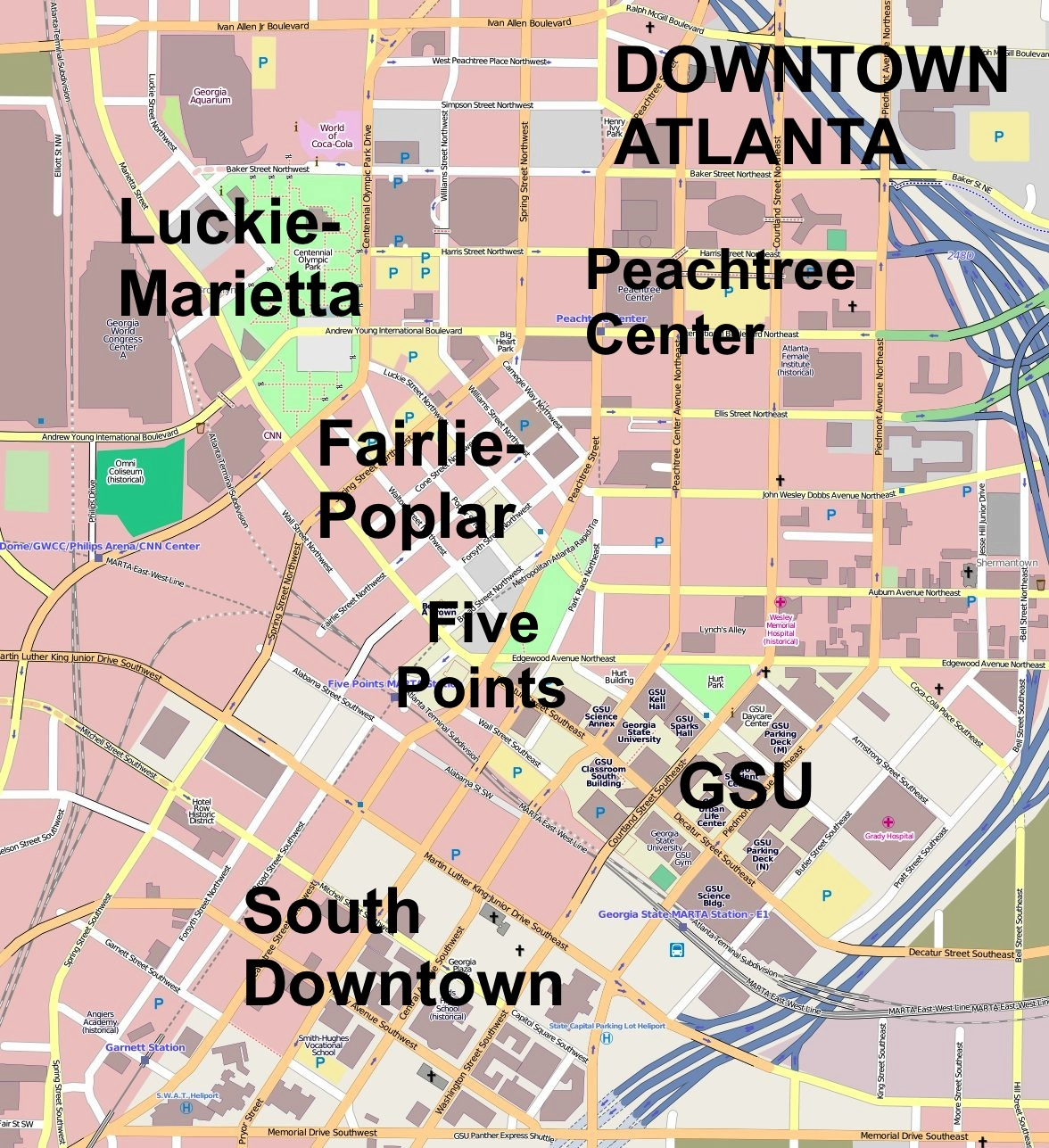
- Location within Downtown Atlanta Location within Atlanta Location within Georgia Location within the United States
- Location: Atlanta, Georgia
- Coordinates: 33°45′3″N 84°23′27″W
- Built: 1914
- Architect: A. Ten Eyck Brown; Morgan & Dillon
- Architectural style: Beaux Arts
- MPS: Georgia County Courthouses TR
- NRHP reference No.: 80001074
- Added to NRHP: September 18, 1980

The Fulton County Courthouse, built between 1911 and 1914, is a historic courthouse building located at 136 Pryor Street SW in Atlanta, seat of Fulton County, Georgia. It was designed by noted Atlanta-based architect A. Ten Eyck Brown (1878–1940), along with the Atlanta firm of Morgan & Dillon. It replaced an earlier building that had been designed by architect William H. Parkins. It is officially the Lewis R. Slaton Courthouse.

On September 18, 1980, the original building was added to the National Register of Historic Places (refnum 80001074). An annex across the street is connected via skywalk. Both are located in South Downtown.

On March 11, 2005, Brian Nichols killed three people, including a judge and a police sergeant, while escaping from the courthouse. He later killed an off-duty federal agent before being recaptured.

== See also ==
- National Register of Historic Places listings in Fulton County, Georgia
