= Thiesen Building =

- U.S. National Register of Historic Places
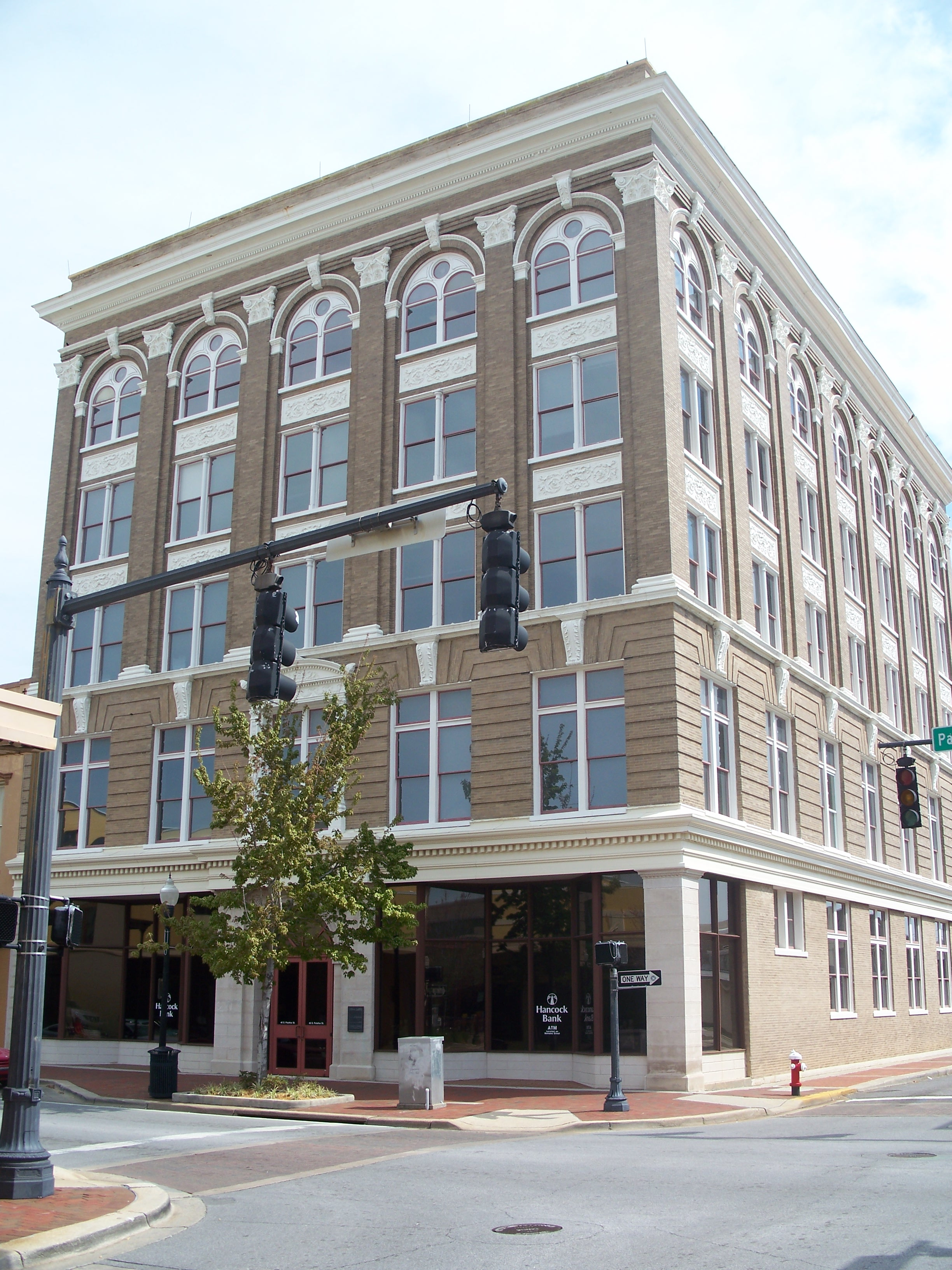

- Location within Florida Location within the United States
- Interactive map showing the location of Thiesen Building
- Location: 40 S. Palafox St., Pensacola, Florida
- Coordinates: 30°24′32″N 87°12′38″W
- Area: less than one acre
- Built by: Wills & Broughton
- Architect: Morgan & Dillon
- Architectural style: Commercial style
- NRHP reference No.: 79000672
- Added to NRHP: December 13, 1979

The Thiesen Building, built in 1901, is a historic site in Pensacola, Florida. It is located at 40 South Palafox Street (the northeast corner of the intersection of South Palafox and West Romana Streets). On December 13, 1979, it was added to the U.S. National Register of Historic Places.

The Thiesen Building is Pensacola’s first commercial high-rise. At the time of its construction in 1901, this five-story building was the tallest in the city and the first to feature a mechanical passenger elevator and steam heat. Built in a Renaissance Revival style, it features terra-cotta ornamentation on the west and south facades.

== History ==
The Thiesen Building was conceived and financed by Pensacola businessman Christen Ustrup Thiesen, designed by the Atlanta architectural firm of Morgan & Dillon, and constructed by Pensacola contractors Wills & Broughton.

Christen Thiesen's career as a Pensacola businessman had begun through unusual circumstances. Born in Denmark, Thiesen was the navigator of a Danish sailing ship. Thiesen became stranded in Pensacola during the Pensacola yellow fever epidemic of 1882 when his ship left without him. Thiesen, who contracted yellow fever but recovered, found a job tending bar in a saloon. The saloon owner died in the epidemic. In 1884, Thiesen married the saloon owner's widow, and thus became the owner of the saloon.

The Thiesen Building was considered a risky venture; some Pensacolians called it "Thiesen's folly". However, it proved to be financially successful, with retail stores on the ground floor and professional offices on the upper floors.

By the 1970s, the building had fallen into disrepair and had become vacant. In 1992 businessman Ray Russenberger purchased and renovated the building to provide offices for his paging company Network USA. He restored the exterior to its original 1901 design. On January 4, 2019, Litvak, Beasley, Wilson, and Ball, LLP began to occupy the third floor as a law office.

== Gallery ==
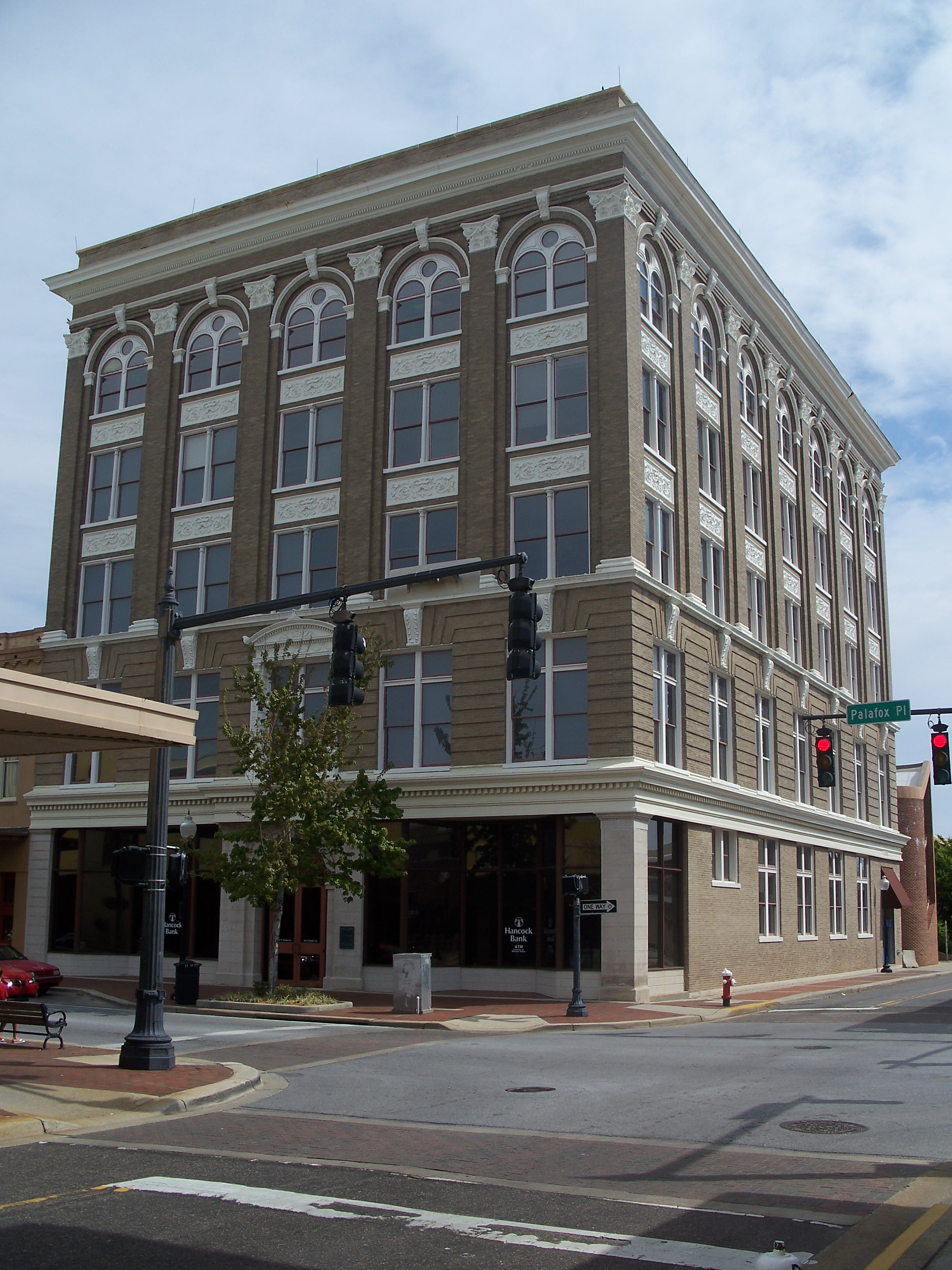

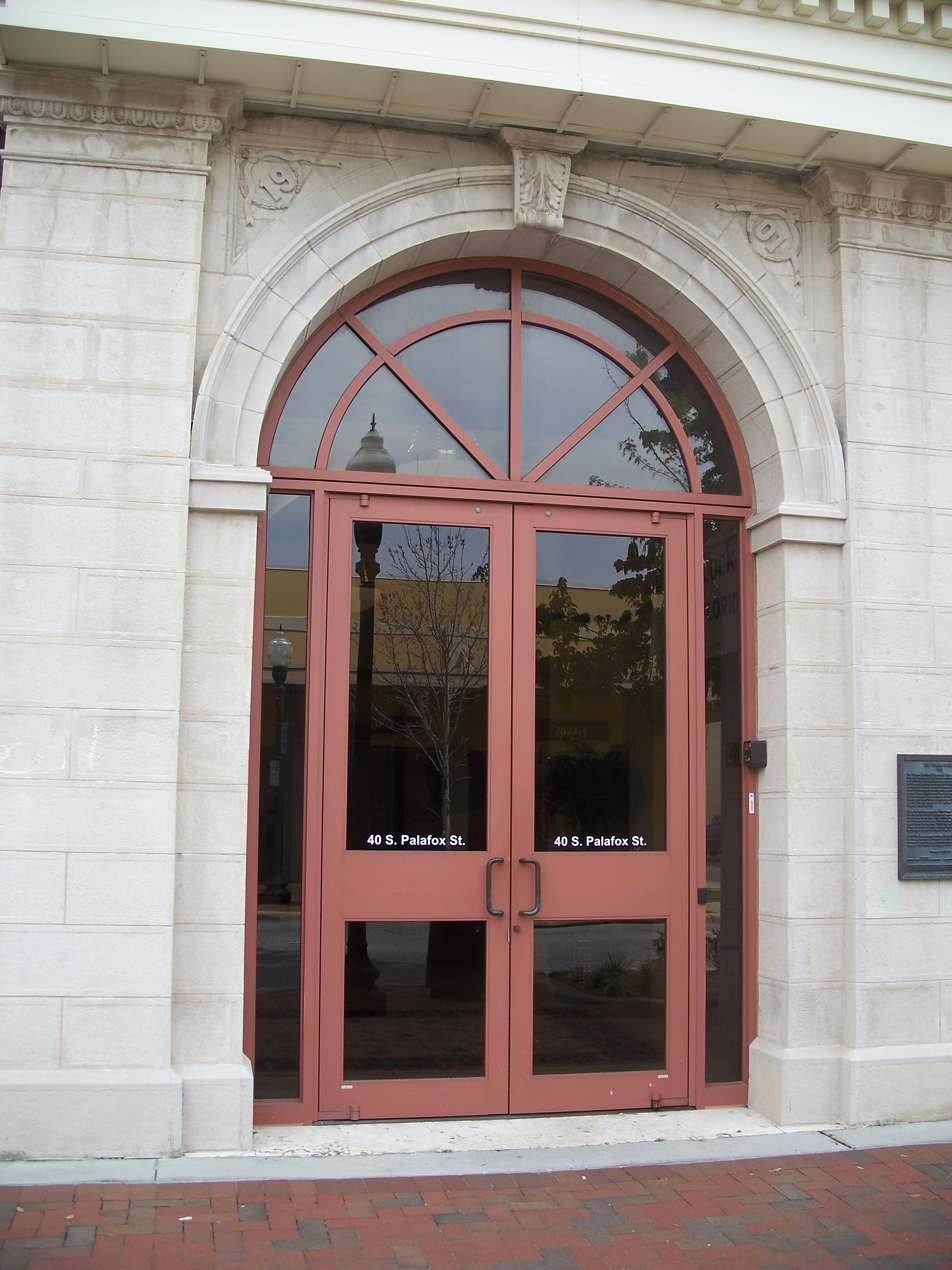

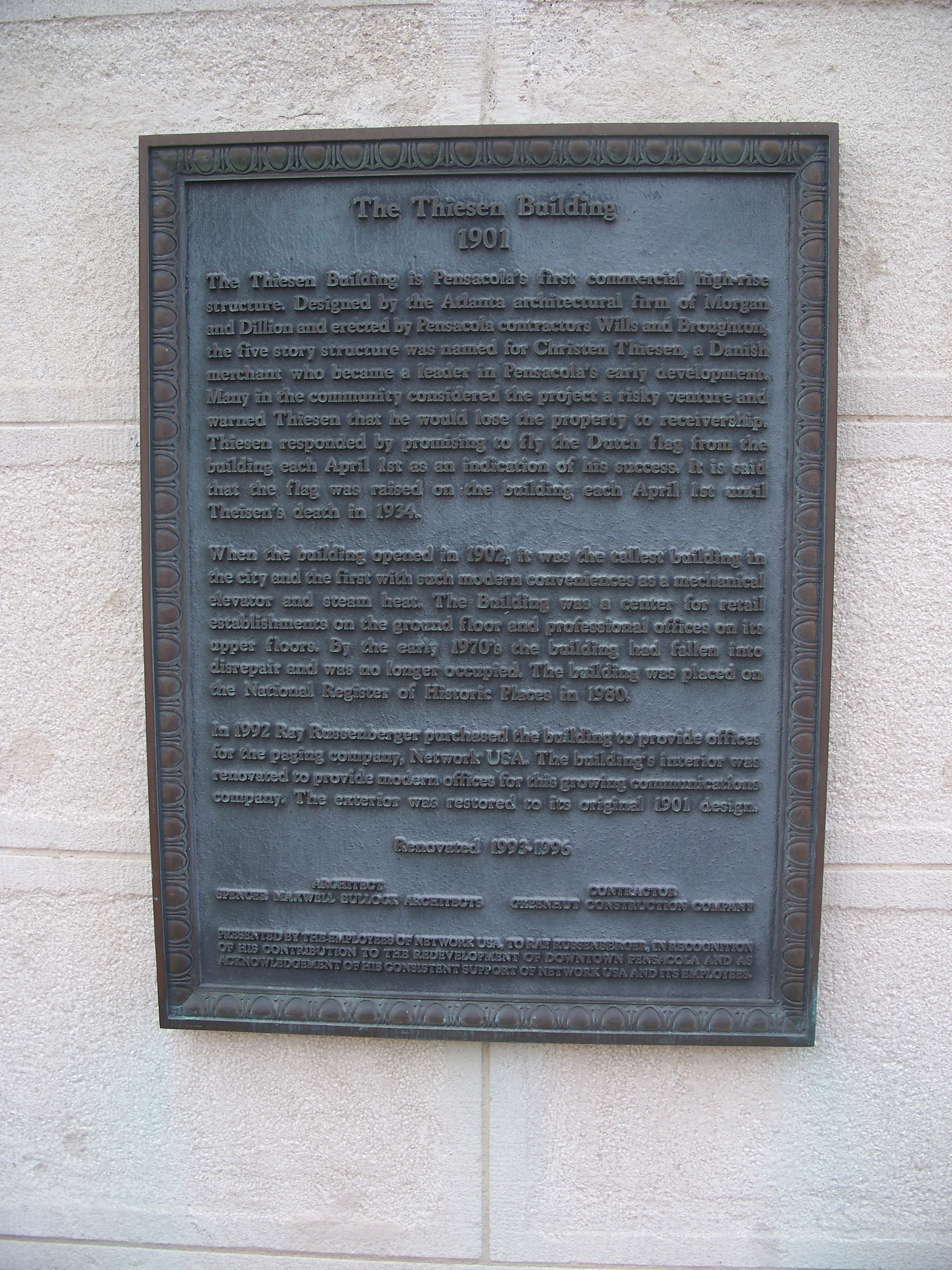
