= Richard Philipps (disambiguation) =

Richard Philipps (1661–1750) was a general in the British Army.

Richard Philipps may also refer to:

- Richard Philipps (died 1561) (by 1534–1561), MP for Pembroke
- Richard Philipps, 1st Baron Milford (first creation) (1744–1823), Welsh landowner and Tory politician
- Richard Philipps, 1st Baron Milford (second creation) (1801–1857), British politician and landowner

== See also ==
- Richard Phillips (disambiguation)
