= Walter T. Downing =

American architect

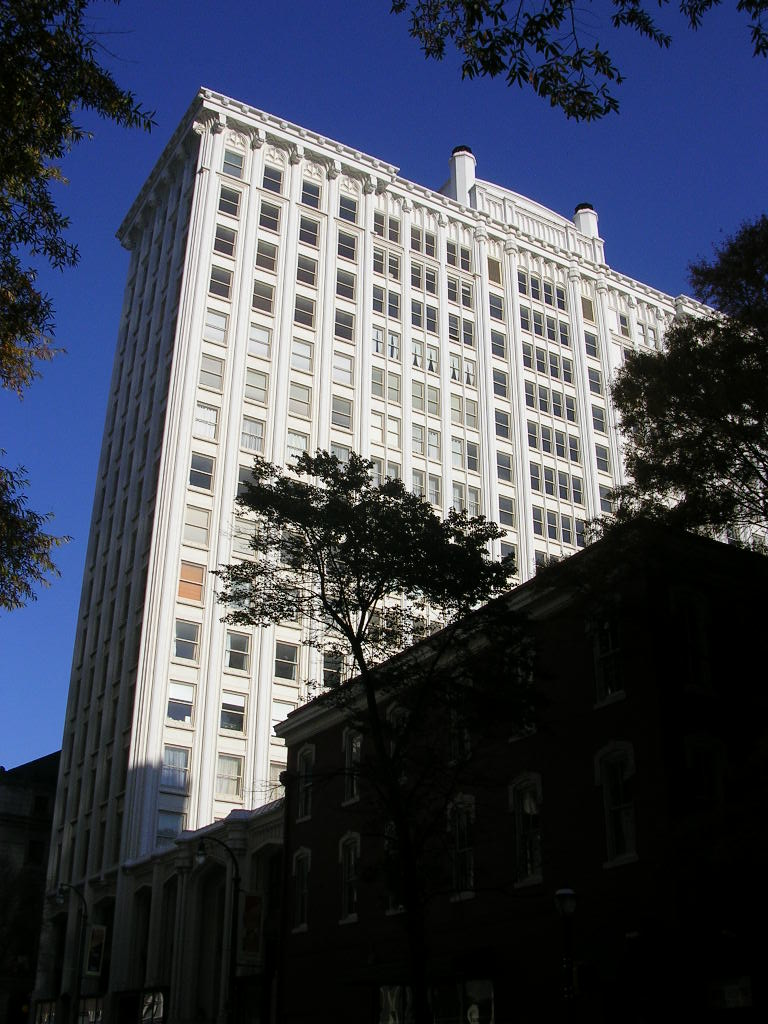
Healey Building

Walter T. Downing (1865-1918) was an American architect in Atlanta, Georgia. Several of his works are listed on the National Register of Historic Places. Walter T. Downing was father of John F. Downing, who was also an architect and who continued his father's firm.

== Work ==
- Capt. Edward Gay House (1896), a.k.a. Training and Counseling Center at Saint Luke's, 98 Currier Street NE, Atlanta, Georgia
- Atlanta Women's Club (1898), a.k.a. Wimbish House, 1150 Peachtree St., NE, Atlanta, Georgia (Downing, Walter T.), NRHP-listed
- Church of the Sacred Heart of Jesus (1897-1898), 335 Ivy St., NE, Atlanta, Georgia (Downing, Walter T.), NRHP-listed
- Dr. James Dodson House (1915–18), Druid Hills, Georgia
- Eiseman Clothing Company store (1901–02), Atlanta, Georgia
- Frank S. Ellis House (1910–14), 1 Peachtree Circle, Ansley Park neighborhood, Atlanta, Georgia
- First Presbyterian Church, Atlanta, Georgia
- John Grant House (1921), now the Cherokee Town Club
- Healey Building (1913), 57 Forsyth St., Atlanta, Georgia (Morgan & Dillon; Downing, Walter T.), NRHP-listed
- Sam Jones Memorial United Methodist Church, 100 W. Church St. Cartersville, Georgia (Downing, Walter T.), NRHP-listed
- Lupton Hall (1920), Oglethorpe University, Atlanta, Georgia (with Morgan and Dillon)
- William P. Nicolson House, 821 Piedmont Ave., Atlanta, Georgia (Downing, Walter T.), NRHP-listed
- The Pines, (1896) SE corner of 5th St. and Lapsley Ave. Anniston, Alabama (Downing, Walter T.), NRHP-listed
- Swann Dormitory and the Electrical Engineering (Savant) Building (both 1901), Georgia School of Technology (later Georgia Institute of Technology)
- United Methodist Church, Atlanta, Georgia
- Robert H. Brown Residence, 26 Ponce de Leon Avenue, Atlanta, Georgia, by Walter T. Downing (directly behind Georgian Terrace before Juniper Street)
- Charles Lincoln Gately Residence, 960 Peachtree Street, Atlanta, Georgia, by Walter T. Downing (SW corner of Peachtree & 14th Street)
- Dr. William Perrin Nicolson Residence, 689 Piedmont Avenue, Atlanta, Georgia by Walter T. Downing (SE corner of Piedmont & Sixth Street)
- Judge Henry B. Tompkins, 760 Peachtree Street, Atlanta. NW corner of 8th Street & Peachtree.
- Hudson Moore Residence, 2610 Peachtree Road, Atlanta, Georgia. (The house faced Peachtree Way in Buckhead, property now occupied by Park Place Condominiums)
- Joseph K. Orr, 933 Peachtree Street, Atlanta Georgia (home stood on the SE corner of Peachtree & 14th Street)
- Edward T. Brown Residence 968 Peachtree Street, Atlanta, Georgia Walter T. Downing (home was directly across the street from Colony Square Tower #2)
- Wilmer L. Moore Residence 964 Peachtree Street, Atlanta, Georgia. (home stood on NW corner of Peachtree & 14th Street, adjacent to Edward T. Brown home)
- Hugh Richardson Residence, 400 West Peachtree Street, Atlanta, Georgia. (home stood on NW corner of West Peachtree & 5th Street, directly across from Biltmore Hotel)
- Packard Garage, 541 Peachtree Street, NE corner of Peachtree Street & North Avenue.
- Edwin Rembert Dubose Residence, 1695 Peachtree Road, Atlanta, Georgia, Architects Smith & Downing. The home still stands near the intersection of Peachtree Road & Collier Road (behind a commercial building in the original location now known as 1919 Peachtree Road)
- Charles E. Boynton Residence, 272 Rawson Avenue, Atlanta, Georgia
- Chattanooga Golf and Country Club (building, not the course)
