= Morgan & Dillon =

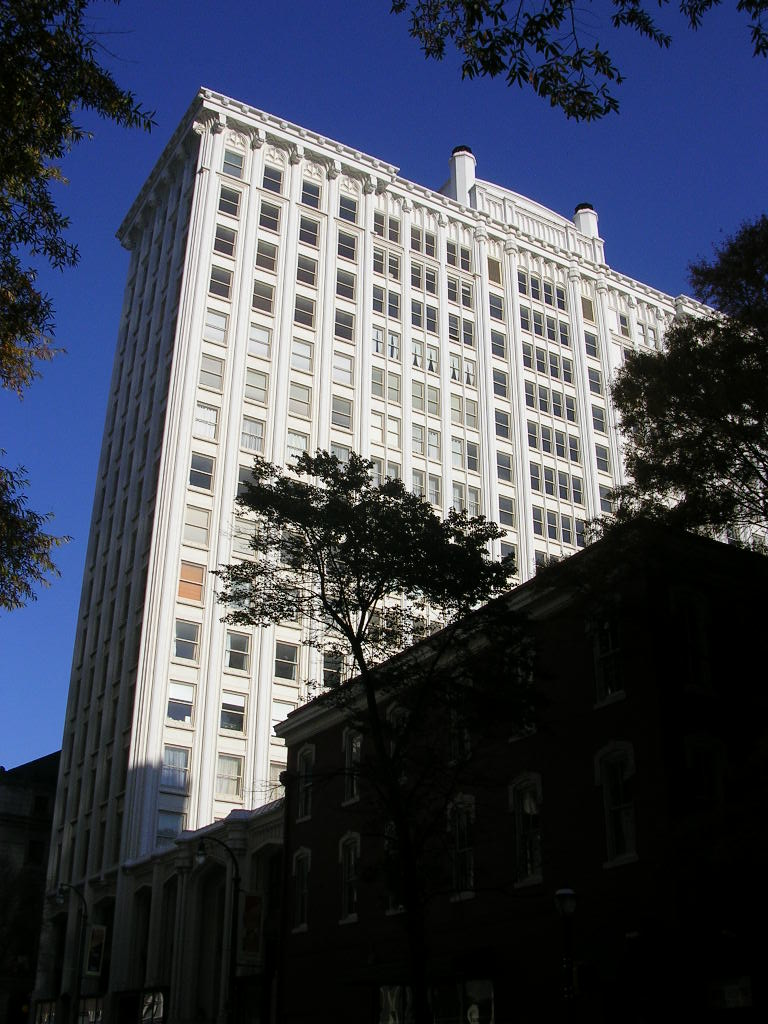
Healey Building

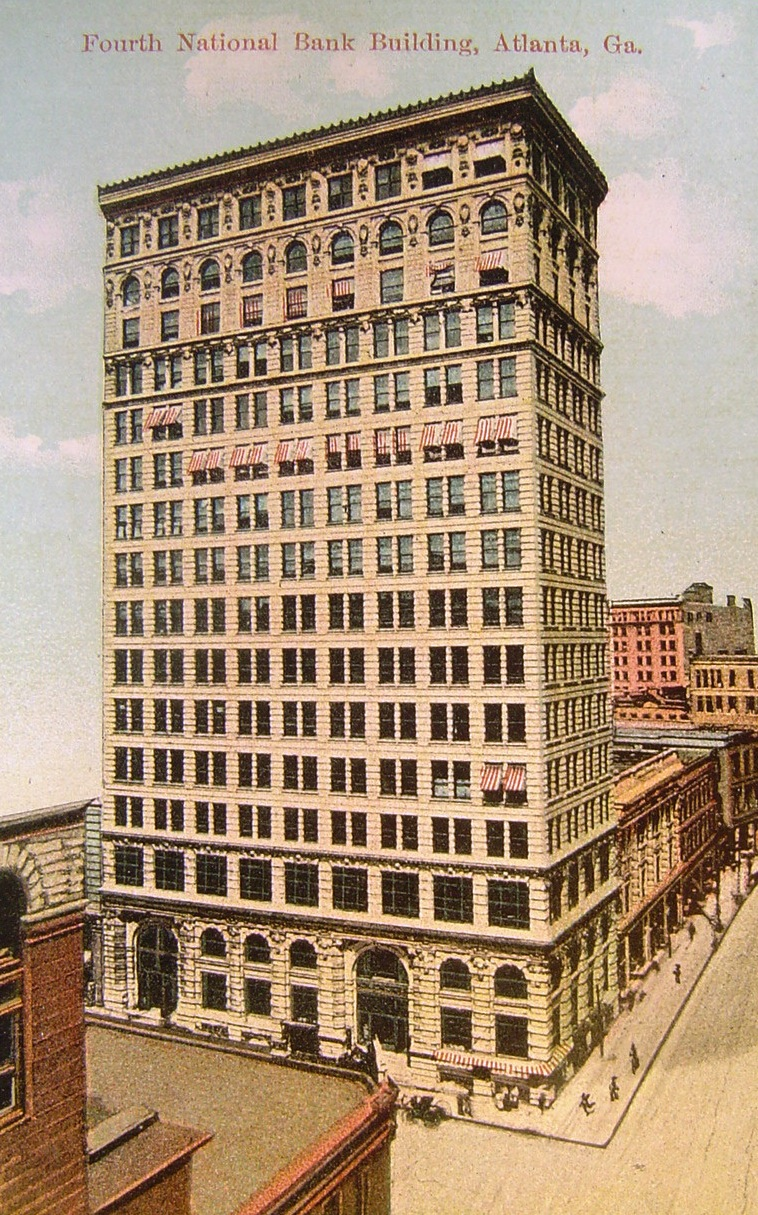
Fourth National Bank building, about 1908

Morgan & Dillon was a major architectural firm of Atlanta, Georgia, USA. It later became Morgan, Dillon & Lewis.

W.T. Downing worked for the firm and was its lead designer for the Healey Building.

A number of its works are listed on the National Register of Historic Places and include (with variations in attribution):

- Fulton County Almshouse (now Galloway School), 215 West Wieuca Road NW, Atlanta, Georgia (Morgan & Dillon)
- Citizen's and Southern Bank Building, 35 Broad St., Atlanta, Georgia (Morgan & Dillon)
- Early County Courthouse, Courthouse Sq., Blakely, Georgia (Morgan & Dillon)
- Fire Station No. 11, 30 North Ave., Atlanta, Georgia (Morgan & Dillon)
- Fulton County Courthouse, 160 Pryor St., SW, Atlanta, Georgia (Morgan & Dillon)
- Healey Building, 57 Forsyth St., Atlanta, Georgia (Morgan & Dillon)
- One or more works in Oglethorpe University Historic District, 4484 Peachtree Rd. NE., Atlanta, Georgia (Morgan and Dillon)
- Retail Credit Company Home Office Building, 90 Fairlie St., SW, Atlanta, Georgia (Morgan, Dillon & Lewis)
- Thiesen Building, 40 S. Palafox St., Pensacola, Florida (Morgan & Dillon)

Other works include the Fourth National Bank of Atlanta, SW corner Peachtree and Marietta streets, Atlanta (part of the building survives as the Andrew Young School of Policy Studies) and The Metropolitan, 22 Marietta Street, formerly Atlanta Federal Savings, prior to that the Third National Bank of Atlanta.

== See also ==
- Bruce & Morgan
