= The Pines (Anniston, Alabama) =

Historic house in Alabama, United States

- U.S. National Register of Historic Places
- The house in January 1991

- Location within Alabama Location within the United States
- Location: SE corner of 5th St. and Lapsley Ave., Anniston, Alabama
- Coordinates: 33°38′59″N 85°49′21″W
- Area: 1 acre (0.40 ha)
- Built: 1896
- Architect: Walter T. Downing
- Architectural style: Colonial Revival
- NRHP reference No.: 91000594
- Added to NRHP: May 13, 1991

The Pines was a house in Anniston, Alabama, United States. It was designed by architect Walter T. Downing and built in 1896. It was listed on the National Register of Historic Places in 1991. The listing included one contributing building and one contributing structure. The house was demolished in April 2014.
