= Bank of the State of Georgia =

The Bank of the State of Georgia was organized in Atlanta on April 1, 1873. The founders were Francis M. Coker (who served as president), Lemuel P. Grant, developer Thomas G. Healey, and future mayor Robert F. Maddox. The bank was liquidated in May 1917.

== See also ==
- Israel Keech Tefft, cashier for the bank
