= Elbert P. Tuttle United States Court of Appeals Building =

- U.S. Post Office and Courthouse
- U.S. National Register of Historic Places
- U.S. National Historic Landmark
- U.S. Historic district – Contributing property
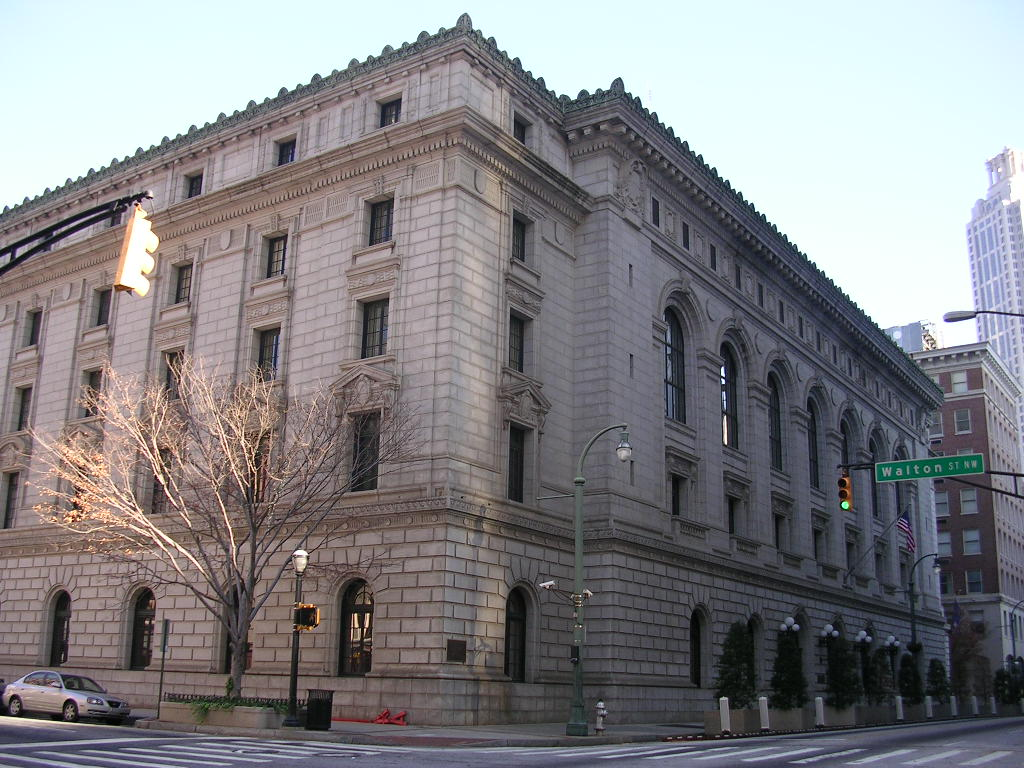
- Elbert P. Tuttle U.S. Courthouse, November 2007

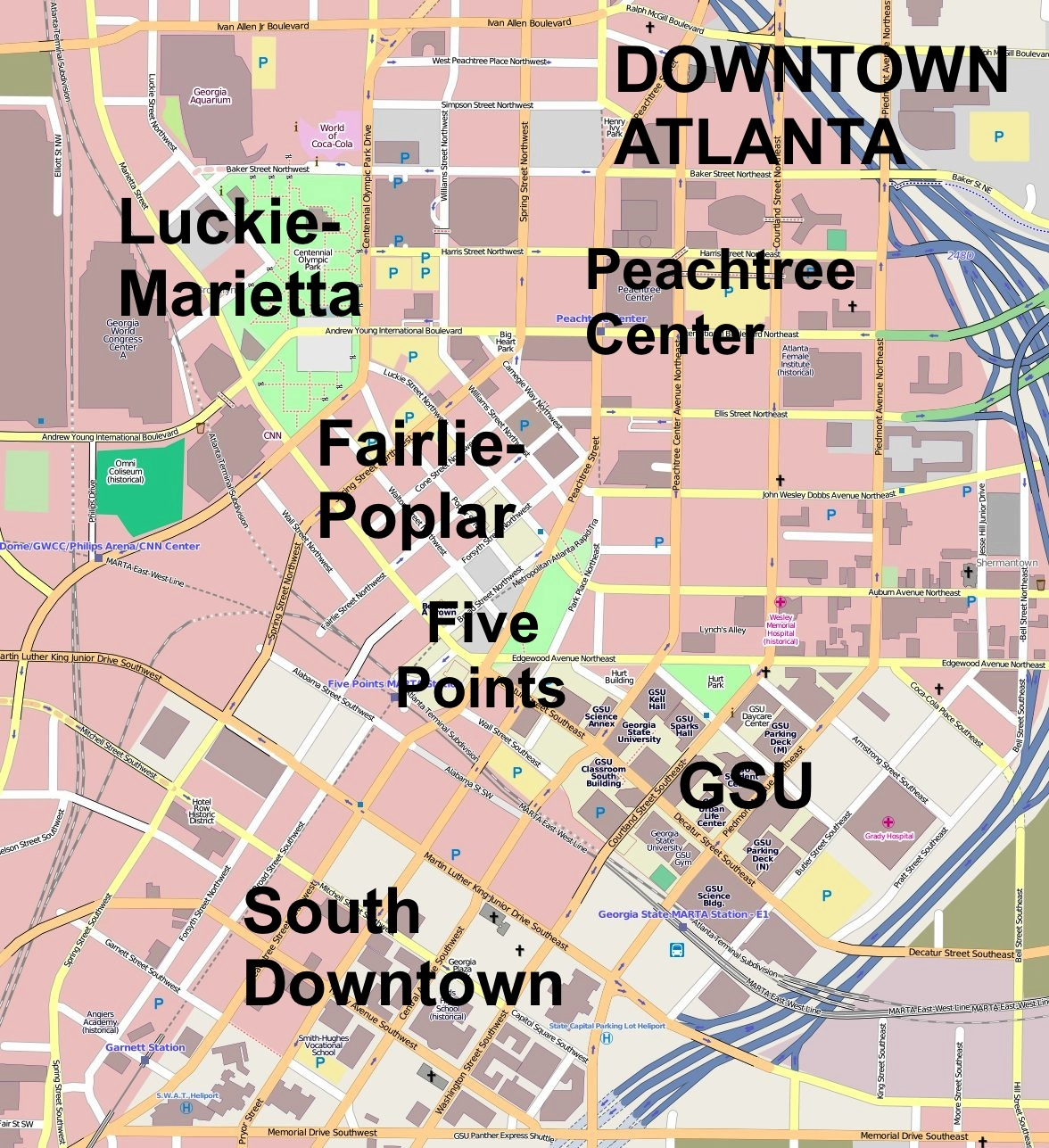
- Location within Downtown Atlanta Location within Georgia
- Location: 56 Forsyth St., Atlanta, Georgia
- Coordinates: 33.75644°N 84.39027°W
- Area: 1 acre (0.40 ha)
- Built: 1910
- Architect: Taylor, James Knox
- Architectural style: Renaissance Revival
- Part of: Fairlie–Poplar Historic District (ID82002416)
- NRHP reference No.: 74000681

Significant dates
- Added to NRHP: May 2, 1974
- Designated NHL: July 20, 2015
- Designated CP: September 9, 1982

The Elbert P. Tuttle U.S. Court of Appeals Building, also known as U.S. Post Office and Courthouse, is a historic Renaissance Revival style courthouse located in the Fairlie-Poplar district of Downtown Atlanta in Fulton County, Georgia. It is the courthouse for the United States Court of Appeals for the Eleventh Circuit.

Its role as the first courthouse in which many key cases of the Civil Rights Movement were heard had it listed on the National Register of Historic Places in 1974. It was listed as a contributing building in the Fairlie Poplar Historic District in 1984. It was designated a National Historic Landmark in 2015.

== Building history ==
In the years following the American Civil War, Atlanta's population expanded rapidly. To meet increased demands for federal services, Congress approved funds for a new building containing both postal and courthouse functions. When ground was broken in 1907, workers discovered a natural rock formation that resembled an American eagle, which observers interpreted to mean that the federal building was destined for the site. James Knox Taylor, supervising architect of the U.S. Treasury Department, designed the building, which was completed in 1910 and deemed by the press to be "a great step forward in the scheme of beautifying Atlanta."

When the Eleventh Circuit Court of Appeals was established in 1981, it occupied the building, which was renamed in 1989 to honor Elbert Parr Tuttle (1897–1996), a renowned federal judge.

Many important cases have been argued in the courthouse. In 2000, the court upheld the U.S. Government's decision that Elian Gonzalez, a Cuban boy who was rescued off the Florida coast after his mother died during an attempt to enter the United States, should be returned to the custody of his father, in Cuba. The same year, several lawsuits involving the presidential election were decided. In Bush v. Gore, the Eleventh Circuit Court of Appeals upheld the denial of a petition to stop manual recounts of ballots. The controversy eventually was decided by the Supreme Court.

== Architecture ==
James Knox Taylor designed the Elbert P. Tuttle U.S. Court of Appeals Building in the Second Renaissance Revival style of architecture. The dignified style was commonly used for federal buildings during the early twentieth century.

The building occupies the block bounded by Forsyth, Fairlie, Poplar, and Walton streets in downtown Atlanta. It is five stories in height and has a U-shaped footprint with a central courtyard. The building is clad in granite on the street elevations, while the sides that enclose the courtyard are clad in buff-colored brick. The facade faces Forsyth Street. The first story is defined by smooth-faced rusticated granite and round-arched openings. Separating the first and second stories is a stringcourse with medallions and incised vertical designs topped with a wave pattern. Windows on the second level each have a classical balustrade, frieze with carved classical motifs, and molded cornice supported by scrolled brackets. The third and fourth stories are marked by large round-arched windows with scrolled keystones. These windows denote the interior location of the courtrooms. The arched windows are divided by classical pilasters (attached columns) and circular medallions. The top level has small rectangular windows separated by cartouches (decorative ovals). A heavy, ornate cornice with a dentil (rectangular block) course and carved anthemion motifs tops the building.

Other elevations contain a similar level of detail, although they lack the two-story arched windows. Windows on other elevations are topped with pediments containing cartouches or lintels with medallions or carved keystones. Some windows contain carved serpent-and-staff designs, which were associated with Mercury, the Roman messenger god who was an early symbol of the postal service in the United States. An iron arch spans a loading dock in the courtyard area on Fairlie Street.

Many original interior finishes and public spaces remain. The dominant feature of the first-floor lobby is its vaulted ceiling, which springs from a series of pilasters. At each end of the lobby are domed ceilings. Window and door frames and wainscot are marble, while upper wall surfaces are covered with plaster. Original arched, bronze casement windows remain in place. Beneath each window is an original wall-mounted marble letter table resting on cast-iron brackets. Floors were originally marble, but are now covered with green terrazzo panels trimmed with gray terrazzo. A mural by an unknown artist depicts a classical seated figure of Justice flanked by allegorical representations of Agriculture and Industry. A staircase with marble treads and wainscot and a cast-iron baluster with a swag pattern leads to upper floors.

The main courtrooms are the most significant spaces on the third floor. The most impressive is the two-story en banc courtroom that is designed for all of the appellate judges to meet to hear a case. Walls are covered with elaborately carved, stained oak paneling decorated with garlands, scrolled brackets, and molding. Large, round-arch windows are balanced with recessed arched bays on the opposite walls. Bronze grilles are located throughout. The maple floor is laid in a herringbone pattern and an elaborate coffered plaster ceiling with rosettes tops the room. Another appellate courtroom, although slightly smaller in scale, is equally impressive. Similar finishes are used on the walls and floor, and a gallery of oak benches provides seating for observers.

== Significant events ==
- 1906-1910: U.S. Post Office constructed
- 1974: Building listed in the National Register of Historic Places
- 1981: U.S. Court of Appeals (Eleventh Circuit) established
- 1989: Building renamed to honor Judge Elbert Parr Tuttle
- 2000: Elian Gonzalez case and Bush v. Gore argued
- 2015: Building designated a National Historic Landmark

== Building facts ==
- Location: 56 Forsyth Street
- Architect: James Knox Taylor
- Construction Dates: 1906–1910
- Architectural Style: Second Renaissance Revival
- Landmark Status: Individually listed in the National Register of Historic Places and a contributing building within the Fairlie Poplar Historic District
- Primary Material: Granite
- Prominent Features: Ornate classical exterior; Vaulted lobby ceiling

== See also ==
- List of United States federal courthouses in Georgia
- List of National Historic Landmarks in Georgia (U.S. state)
- National Register of Historic Places listings in Fulton County, Georgia
- List of United States post offices
