= Thomas G. Healey =

American businessman

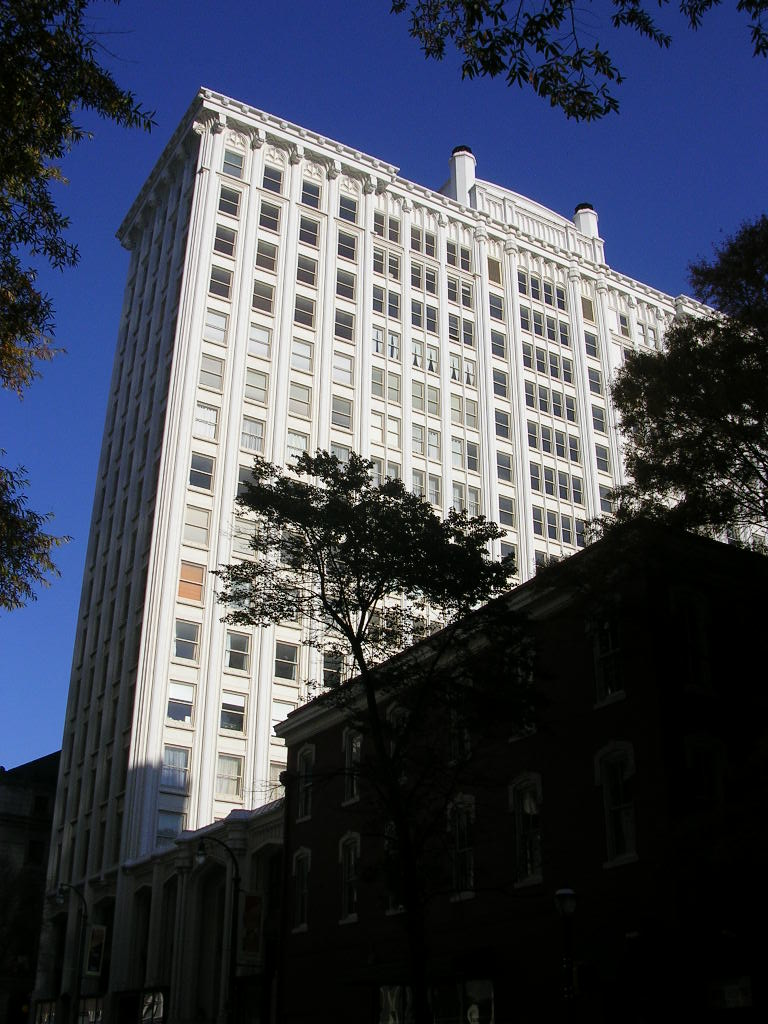
Healey Building in Downtown Atlanta

Thomas G. Healey (c. 1818–1897) was an Atlanta real estate developer, politician, street railway entrepreneur and banker. Healey started in the brick-making business and as a builder and contractor in partnership with Maxwell Berry who together managed the construction of Church (now Shrine) of the Immaculate Conception and the United States U.S. Post Office and Customs House (later used as City Hall). Healey invested in land including the northwest corner of Marietta and Peachtree Streets where he built the first Healey Building.

Healey's other endeavors included:

- In 1873, co-founded the Bank of the State of Georgia
- From 1877 to 1882, president of the Atlanta Gas Light Company
- In the 1880s, president of the West End & Atlanta Street Railroad
- Executive Committee of the 1881 International Cotton Exposition
- Director of Joel Hurt's Atlanta Home Insurance Company
- City alderman-at-large (1881) and mayor pro tem (1884)

== Legacy ==
After Thomas Healey's death in 1897, his son William carried on the family businesses, which included the construction of the second Healey Building (1914, still standing) in the Fairlie-Poplar district of downtown Atlanta.

The William-Oliver Building was built on the site of the first Healey Building in 1930, and is named after Healey's two grandsons.
