= J. Mack Robinson =

American businessman (1923–2014)

- Born: Jesse Mack Robinson; May 7, 1923; Atlanta, Georgia, US
- Died: February 7, 2014 (aged 90); Atlanta, Georgia, U.S.
- Occupation(s): Businessman and philanthropist

J. Mack Robinson (May 7, 1923 – February 7, 2014) was a Georgia businessman. He led several of Atlanta's major corporations. Robinson was also a notable philanthropist who donated millions of dollars to causes in his home state and elsewhere.

== Early career ==
Mack Robinson was born in Atlanta on May 7, 1923, and entered the business world at age ten, when he was hired as a "helper" at the Atlanta Journal. Within five years he had become a circulation district manager working out of the newspaper's main office. After graduating from Boys High School and serving in the U.S. Army during World War II (1941–45), Robinson briefly returned to work for the Journal after the war.

While working for the newspaper, Robinson opened up two used-car lots in Atlanta, Baker Street Motors and Robinson Motors. Both proved profitable, and within a short time Robinson left the Journal and began working full-time selling cars. Over the next several years he opened up several more car lots in Atlanta, Augusta, Columbus, and Macon. This enterprise led him to his next business venture in the finance industry.

== Finance and insurance career ==
As a used-car salesman, Robinson had been financing the purchase of cars through an automobile finance company in Chicago, Illinois. Seeing the potential for profit, Robinson founded his own company, the Dixie Finance Company, in 1948. He quickly discovered that he enjoyed the finance industry more than the used-car business. Robinson sold his car lots and soon started another finance business, Gulf Finance Company. Over the next twenty years, his companies experienced great success, expanding into more than 100 cities across the South.

During this period Robinson dealt closely with numerous insurance companies and, once again seeing an opportunity, decided to enter the insurance business. He formed Delta Life Insurance and, a short time later, Delta Fire and Casualty Insurance Company. The new businesses proved successful. In 1974 Robinson purchased the Atlantic American Corporation, an Atlanta-based insurance company founded in 1937. He has served as its director and chairman of the board and, from 1988 to 1995, actively helped run the company as president and chief executive officer.

In the mid-1960s Robinson expanded into the banking industry and began buying local banks in small towns around Atlanta. His strategy was to enter small markets in which his business would usually become, immediately upon opening, the largest finance company in the town and encounter minimum competition. Over the next several years he not only purchased twenty-two small banks with branches in more than fifty cities but also acquired a state charter to open his own bank. In 1972 Robinson sold more than 100 of his finance offices to the First National Bank of Atlanta (later Wachovia Bank). With the sale, he became a director at the bank and its largest individual shareholder.

== Investments and philanthropy ==
He and his wife, Nita, along with their daughters, Jill and Robin, have donated funds to a number of Georgia entities and become involved in the worlds of high fashion and horse racing.

In the early 1960s, Robinson invested personal funds to help the well-known designer Yves Saint Laurent start his own fashion house. He played an integral role during the first years of Saint Laurent's business, writing checks and traveling to Paris, France, several times a year. In 1966 Robinson sold his share in the fashion house for $1 million. Another interest, horse racing, inspired Robinson to purchase and operate a horse farm in Thomasville, which has about ninety horses and a five-eighths-of-a-mile racetrack. Cherokee Run, a thoroughbred owned by his daughter Jill, won the 1994 Breeder's Cup Sprint.

Robinson has been honored for his philanthropic activities. In 1994 he and his wife were honored by the Georgia chapter of the National Society of Fund-Raising Executives as Philanthropists of the Year. In 1998 he gave the Georgia State University College of Business a $10 million endowment. To thank him for the gift, the school's name was changed to the J. Mack Robinson College of Business. Robinson has also given major donations to The Westminster Schools and Oglethorpe University and has served as director of the Woodruff Arts Center and is a life member of the High Museum of Art's board of directors. In 1995, he received an honorary degree in Doctor of Humane Letters from Oglethorpe University.

In September 2002 Robinson made a return of sorts to his beginnings in the business world when he became the chief executive officer of Gray Television, a communication company that owns television stations nationwide, in addition to five Georgia newspapers.

He died on February 7, 2014, of complications arising from Alzheimer's disease.
