= J. Mack Robinson College of Business Administration Building =

High-rise business school in downtown Atlanta, US

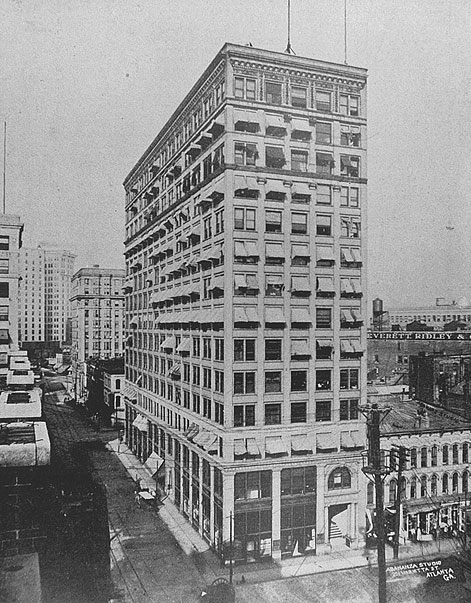
- Empire Building in the early 1900s

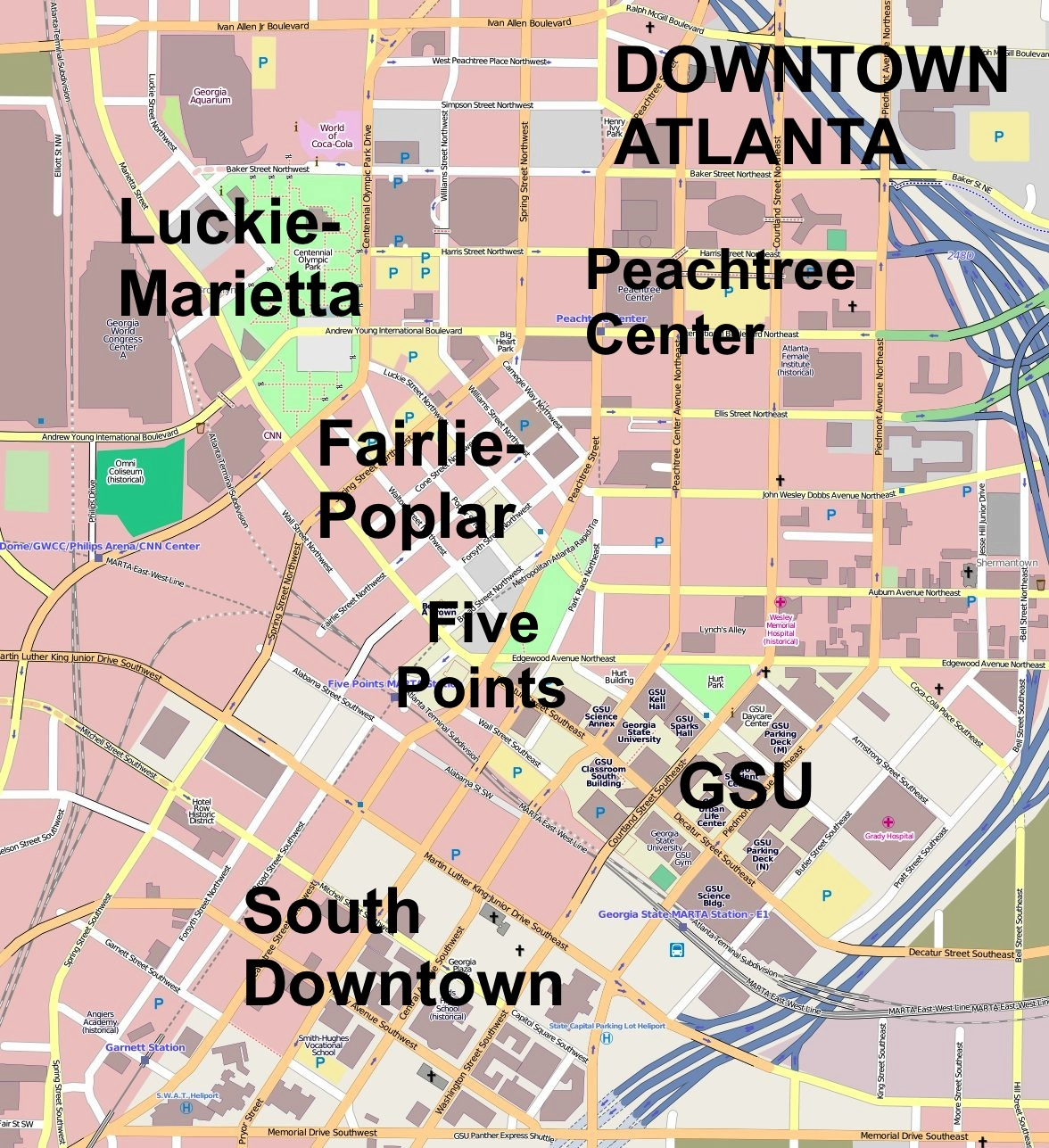
- Location within Downtown Atlanta
- Former names: Bank of America Building; Nationsbank Building; Citizens & Southern National Bank Building; Atlanta Trust Company Building; Empire Building

General information
- Type: University; Commercial offices
- Location: 35 Broad Street NW corner of Marietta Street; Fairlie-Poplar district Georgia State University; Downtown Atlanta; Georgia
- Coordinates: 33.75523°N 84.38997°W
- Completed: 1901
- Owner: Georgia State University (Georgia State Government)

Technical details
- Floor count: 14

Design and construction
- Architects: Bruce & Morgan; Hentz, Reid, Adler & Shutze (remodel)
- Citizen's and Southern Bank Building
- U.S. National Register of Historic Places
- U.S. Historic district – Contributing property
- Atlanta Landmark Building
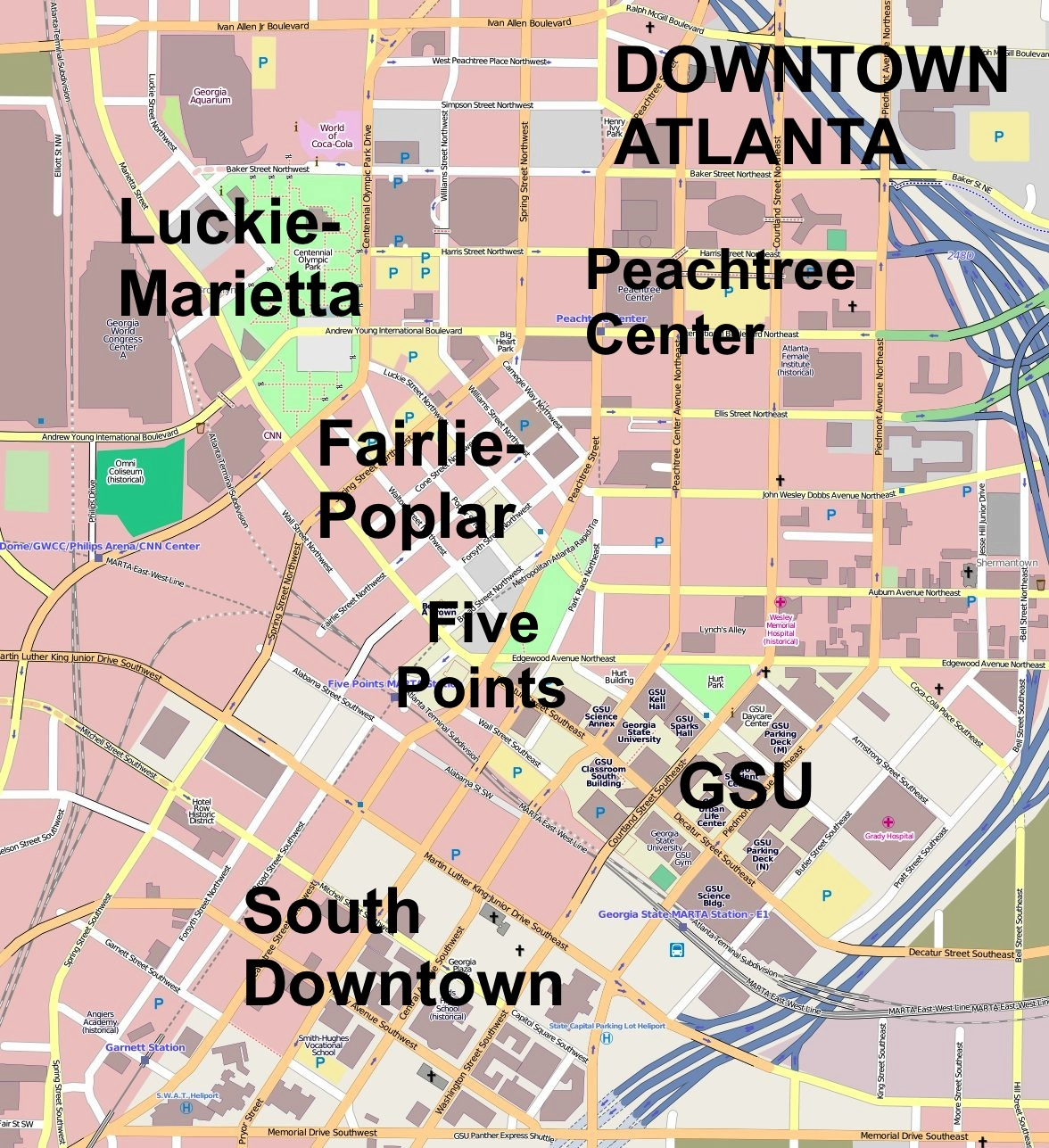
- Location within Downtown Atlanta
- Location: 35 Broad St., Atlanta, Georgia
- Coordinates: 33.75523°N 84.38997°W
- Area: less than one acre
- Built: 1901
- Architect: Morgan & Dillon; Hentz, Adler & Shutze
- Architectural style: Late 19th and 20th Century Revivals
- Part of: Fairlie–Poplar Historic District (ID82002416)
- NRHP reference No.: 77000426

Significant dates
- Added to NRHP: August 18, 1977
- Designated CP: September 9, 1982
- Designated ALB: June 4, 1992

The J. Mack Robinson College of Business Administration Building is a 14-story highrise at the corner of Broad and Marietta streets in the Fairlie-Poplar district of downtown Atlanta, which houses the business school of Georgia State University. When completed in 1901 as the Empire Building, it was the first steel-frame structure and the tallest in the city, until surpassed by the Candler Building in 1906.

Morgan & Dillon and Hentz, Adler & Shutze were architects. In 1972, while named the Citizens & Southern National Bank Building, the structure was added to the National Register of Historic Places.

The ground floor houses a full-service Bank of America branch. NationsBank purchased Citizens & Southern National Bank in 1991, and after later acquiring BankAmerica Corp., it, along with its branches, was renamed Bank of America.

The building doubled as the Illinois First Federal Savings & Loan association building in the 2016 film The Founder, a biopic of Ray Kroc starring Michael Keaton and as a bank in the opening robbery scene in the 2025 film The Naked Gun starting Liam Nelson

== See also ==
- Citizens & Southern National Bank
- J. Mack Robinson College of Business
