= Henry J. Finn =

Canadian-American actor and author

Henry James William Finn (June 17, 1787 – January 13, 1840) was a Canadian-American actor and author.

== Biography ==
Finn was born in Sydney, Nova Scotia. He went to England in his youth, on the invitation of a rich uncle residing there, who died without making any provision for him, and he was obliged to resort to the stage for a support. After a few years he returned to New York City, subsequently revisited England, and in 1822 made his first appearance at the Federal Street Theatre in Boston. He was one of the most popular actors on the stage, his forte being broad comedy.

With his friend Israel Keech Tefft, Finn became joint editor and manager of the Savannah, Georgia, daily newspaper The Georgian and Evening Advertiser in 1821.

He died in the conflagration of the steamboat Lexington. He accumulated a competency, and was on his way to his residence in Newport, Rhode Island, at the time of his death.

== Works ==
He enjoyed a considerable reputation as a humorous writer, and published a Comic Annual and a number of articles in the periodicals. He published a drama entitled "Montgomery, or the Falls of Montmorenci," which was acted with success, and he left besides a manuscript tragedy.
