= Richard D. Phillips =

American economist

Richard D. Phillips is an American economist, currently the C. V. Starr Professor of Risk Management and Insurance at J. Mack Robinson College of Business, Georgia State University.
