= J. Mack Robinson College of Business =

Business school of Georgia State University in Atlanta

Coordinates: 33.755123°N 84.389806°W

- Type: Public
- Established: 1913
- Parent institution: Georgia State University
- Academic affiliations: AACSB
- Dean: Richard D. Phillips
- Undergraduates: 6,214
- Postgraduates: 1,733
- Location: Atlanta, Georgia, U.S.
- Campus: Urban, Suburban
- Website: robinson.gsu.edu

The J. Mack Robinson College of Business is the business school of Georgia State University in Atlanta. Based in the J. Mack Robinson College of Business Administration Building, it is one of Georgia State's six colleges.

== History ==
Robinson College began as the Georgia Tech Evening School of Commerce in 1913. After being moved to downtown Atlanta in 1914, the college continued to grow. In 1955, it was renamed the Georgia State College of Business Administration. In 1998, the college was renamed the J. Mack Robinson College of Business in honor of J. Mack Robinson, an Atlanta entrepreneur, businessman and philanthropist who gave the college a $10 million endowment.

== Academic units and research centers ==
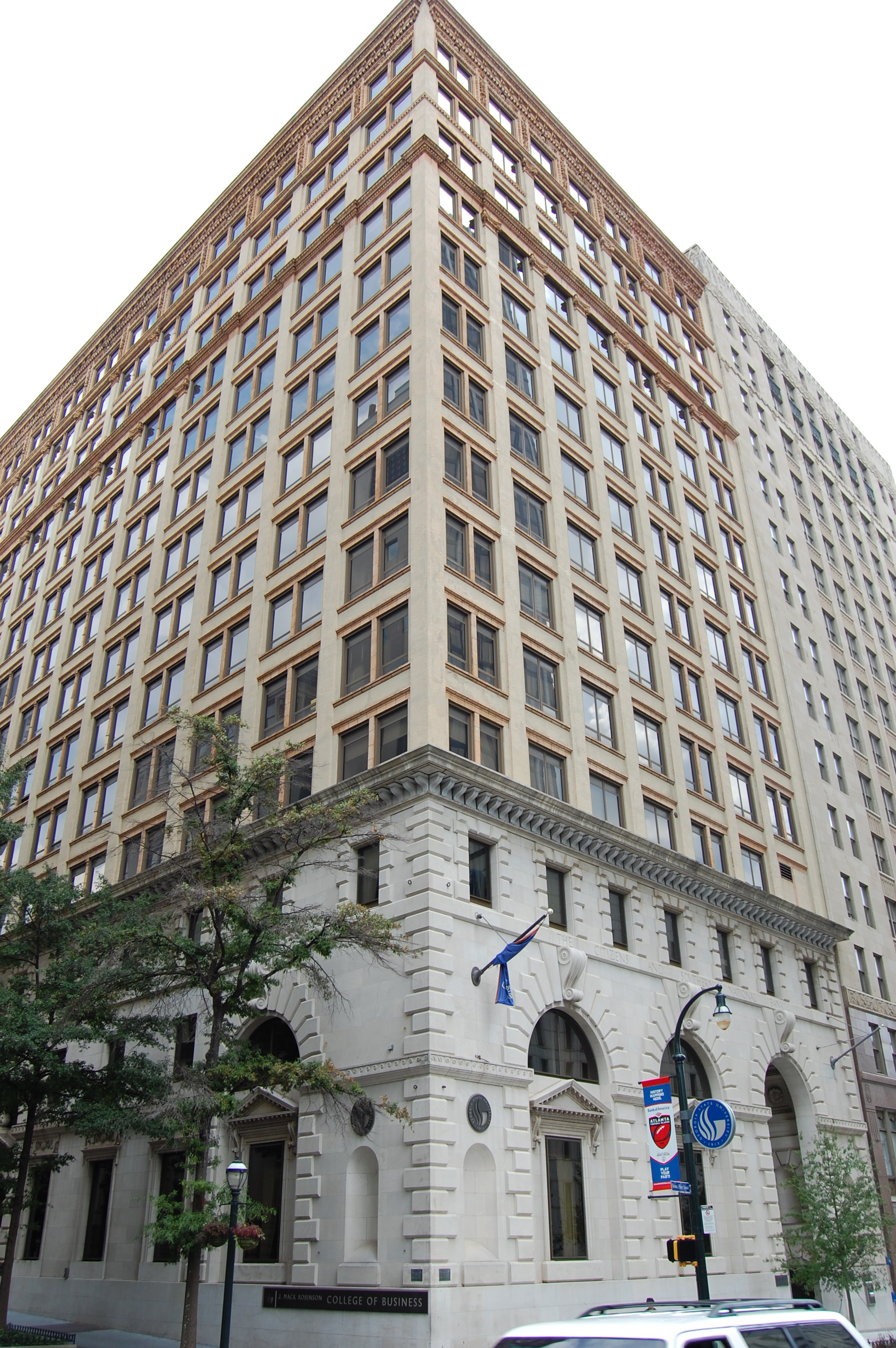
J. Mack Robinson College of Business administration building

=== Research Centers & Institutes ===
- Center for Business & Industrial Marketing
- Center for Digital Innovation
- Center for the Economic Analysis of Risk
- Center for Engaged Business Research
- Center for Health Information Technology
- Center for Health Services Research
- Center for International Business Education & Research
- Center for Mature Consumer Studies
- Center for Research in Information Systems
- Center for Research in Information Security and Privacy
- Economic Forecasting Center
- W.T. Beebe Institute of Personnel and Employment Relations

=== Academic Departments ===
- Cecil B. Day School of Hospitality Administration
- Department of Computer Information Systems
- Department of Finance
- Department of Management
- Department of Marketing
- Department of Real Estate
- Department of Risk Management & Insurance
- Entrepreneurship and Innovation Institute
- Institute of International Business
- Institute of Health Administration
- Institute for Insight
- School of accountancy

== Rankings ==
Business school rankings

U.S. MBA Rankings
- Bloomberg (2025): 25 (Part Time)
- U.S. News & World Report (2026): 29 (Part Time)

For 2019-2020, Robinson's Risk Management and Insurance program was ranked 4th, the Management Information Systems ranked 10th, and the Real Estate program ranked 11th; the Bachelor of Business Administration (BBA) program held onto a top 50 spot ranking 50th (31st amongst public university programs) among the nation's Best Colleges 2020 by U.S. News & World Report; released September 2019.

For 2016, Robinson's Risk Management and Insurance program was ranked 6th, the Computer Information Systems program was ranked 11th, and the B.B.A. program was ranked 50th (30th among public university programs) in the nation by U.S. News & World Report. In addition, the part-time MBA program was also ranked No. 36 in the nation by Bloomberg BusinessWeek.

For 2013–14, the Robinson was ranked 50th among North American MBA programs by Quacquarelli Symonds (QS), as part of the TopMBA Global 200 Business Schools Report. The Master of Professional Accountancy Program was ranked by 2012 and 2019 Public Accounting Report. Both graduate and undergraduate accounting programs were ranked by 2018 Public Accounting Report in the South region.

In research productivity, the 2017 University of Texas at Dallas Top 100 Business School Research Rankings listed Robinson as 24th among North American business schools, 27th worldwide in research productivity between 2012 and 2016.

== Notable alumni ==
- Emily Jacobson, J.D./MBA 2014 - Olympic saber fencer
