= Jeremy Finn =

American psychologist

Jeremy D. Finn is an American psychologist. He is currently a distinguished professor at the State University of New York, as well as a published author.
