= Walter L. Finn =

American politician

Walter Louis Finn (April 15, 1875–November 7, 1936) was an American physician, farmer, and politician.

Finn was born in Marion County, Illinois. He went to Valparaiso University, Southern Illinois University, and Washington University in St. Louis. Finn practiced medicine in Iuka, Illinois and was a farmer. Finn served in the Illinois Senate from 1929 until his death in 1936. He was a Democrat. Finn died from a heart attack at his home in Iuka, Illinois.
