= Fairlie–Poplar, Atlanta =

Coordinates: 33.7569°N 84.3902°W

- Fairlie–Poplar Historic District
- U.S. National Register of Historic Places
- U.S. Historic district
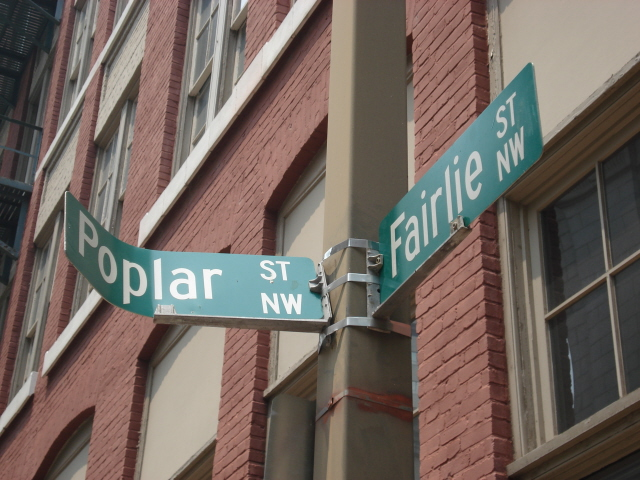
- Intersection of Fairlie and Poplar

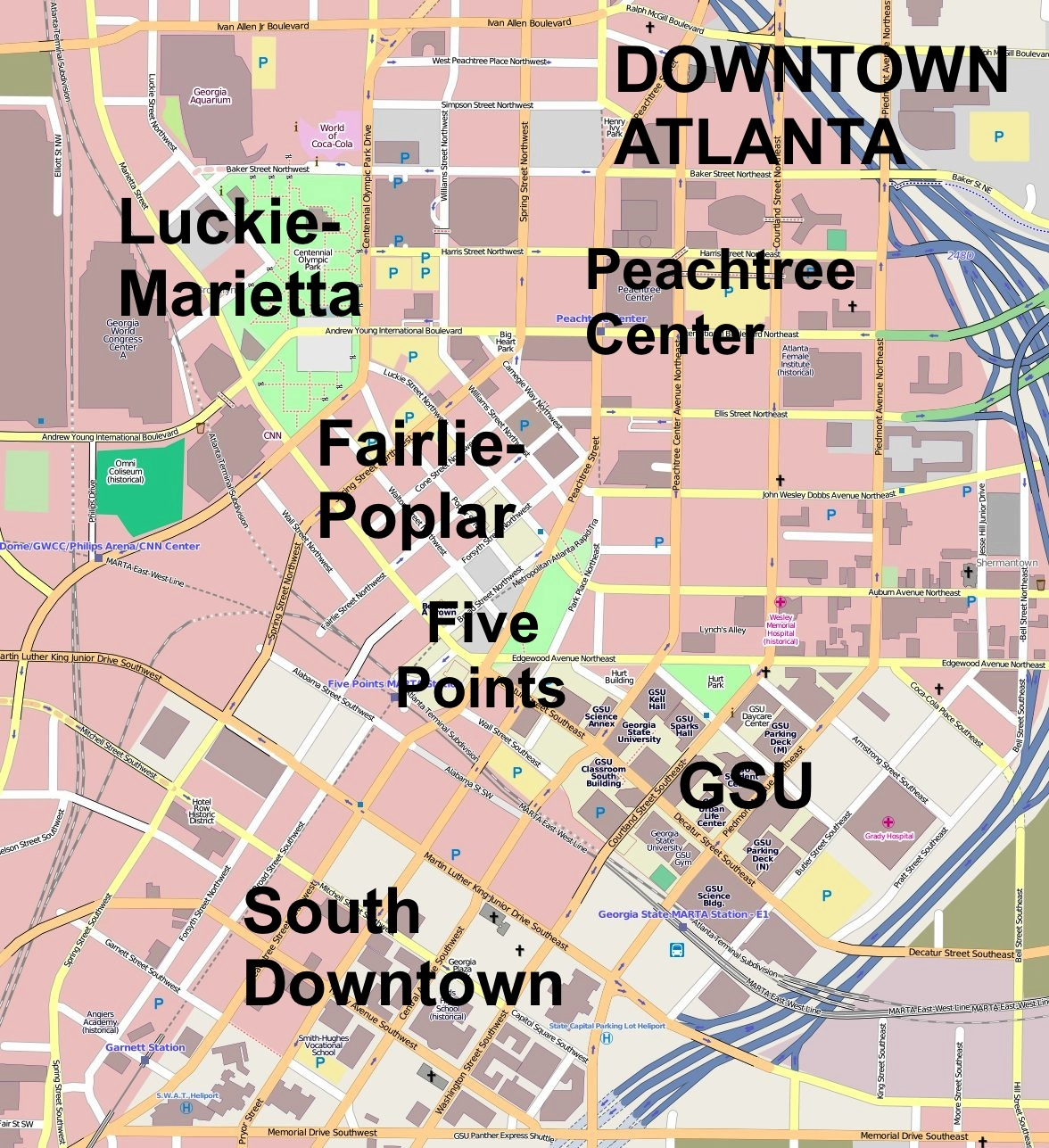
- Location within Downtown Atlanta Location within Atlanta Location within Georgia Location within the United States
- Location: Atlanta, GA
- Architectural style: Chicago, art deco
- NRHP reference No.: 82002416
- Added to NRHP: September 9, 1982

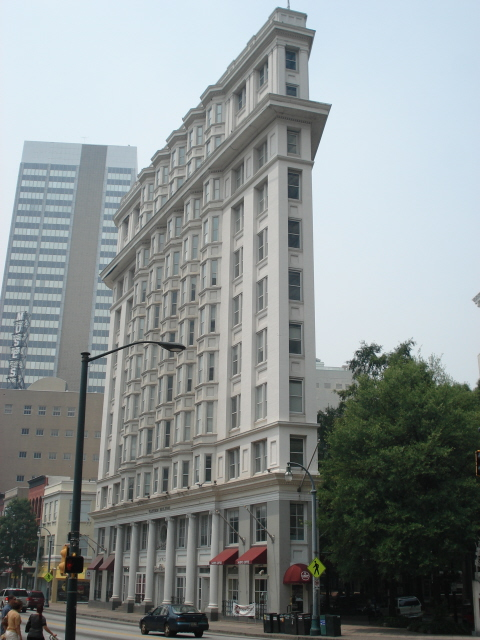
The Flatiron in Atlanta is a well-known landmark in the neighborhood.

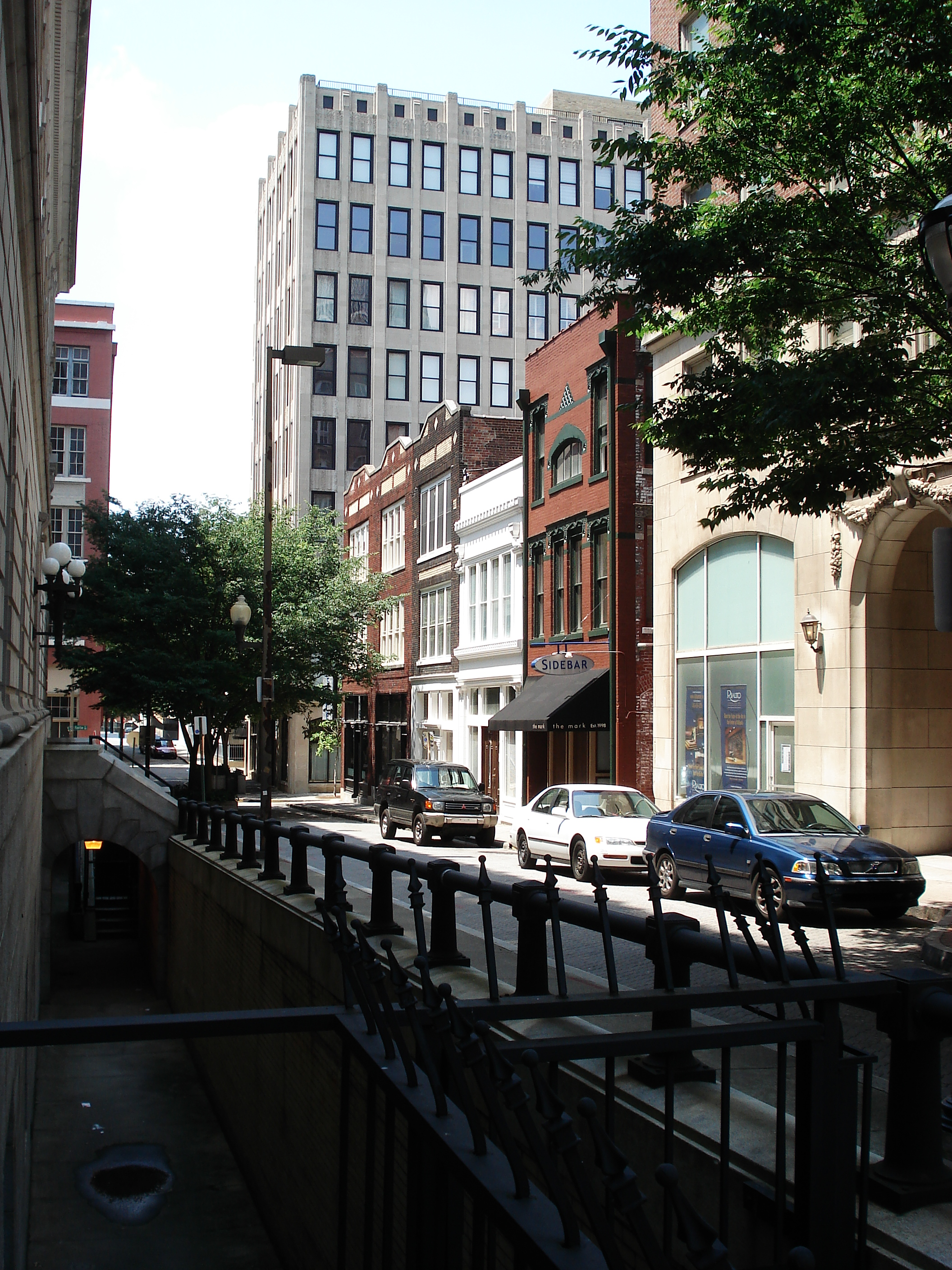
Buildings in the neighborhood

The Fairlie–Poplar Historic District is part of the central business district in downtown Atlanta, Georgia. It is named for the two streets that cross at its center, northeast-only Fairlie and southeast-only Poplar. Fairlie–Poplar is immediately north of Five Points, the definitive center point and longtime commercial heart of Atlanta. It is roughly bounded on the southwest by Marietta Street, on the southeast by Peachtree Street or Park Place, on the northeast by Luckie Street or Williams Street, and on the northwest by Cone Street or Spring Street. It has smaller city blocks than the rest of the city (about half by half), and the streets run at a 40° diagonal.

Fairlie–Poplar contains many commercial and office buildings from the late 19th and early 20th centuries. Local interpretations of prevailing national architectural styles, including Chicago, Renaissance revival, neoclassical, commercial, art deco, Georgian revival, and Victorian styles, are found here. The buildings of the district also represent the shift in building technology from load-bearing masonry and timber walls to steel and concrete framing. Individual buildings listed in the National Register of Historic Places that lie within the Fairlie–Poplar Historic District include the Flatiron Building, the Empire/C&S Building, the Healey Building, the Prudential/W.D. Grant Building, the Retail Credit Company Home Office Building, the Elbert P. Tuttle United States Court of Appeals Building.

== History ==
Fairlie–Poplar was developed during the late 19th century, when Atlanta emerged as the commercial center of Georgia and the Southeast. At the time, the area was promoted as "Atlanta's new modern fireproof business district". It constituted a major northward expansion of Atlanta's post-Civil War business district, which was largely concentrated along Peachtree and Alabama Street (now Underground Atlanta) and along Marietta Street. The new business district contained a wide variety of wholesale and retail operations, which marketed a broad spectrum of consumer goods and services. Public agencies and many of Atlanta's business offices were also located there.

Building materials included brick, stone, cast iron, wood, pressed metal, glazed terra-cotta, and plate glass. The buildings in the district range in height from two to 16 stories, the taller ones constructed with concrete or steel frames, while the smaller buildings were built with load-bearing masonry and timber structural systems.

== Georgia State University ==
A few of the buildings that make up the Georgia State University campus are woven into the Fairlie–Poplar district. The first building that was acquired in Fairlie–Poplar was the former C&S Bank Building on Marietta Street in 1993, which became the J. Mack Robinson College of Business Administration Building. The Rialto Center for the Arts and the Haas-Howell Building followed in 1996 on the corner of Forsyth St. and Luckie St. The Helen M. Aderhold Learning Center is also located on Luckie Street and is one of the most modern lecture buildings on the campus. The Aderhold Center also provides retail and restaurant space on the street level surrounding it, causing it to further blend into the district.

The Georgia State University School of Music occupies the Standard Building on the southeast corner of Fairlie Street and Luckie Street, as well as the Haas-Howell Building on Poplar Street.
