= List of oldest structures in Atlanta =

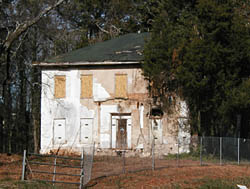
Judge William Wilson House (1857)

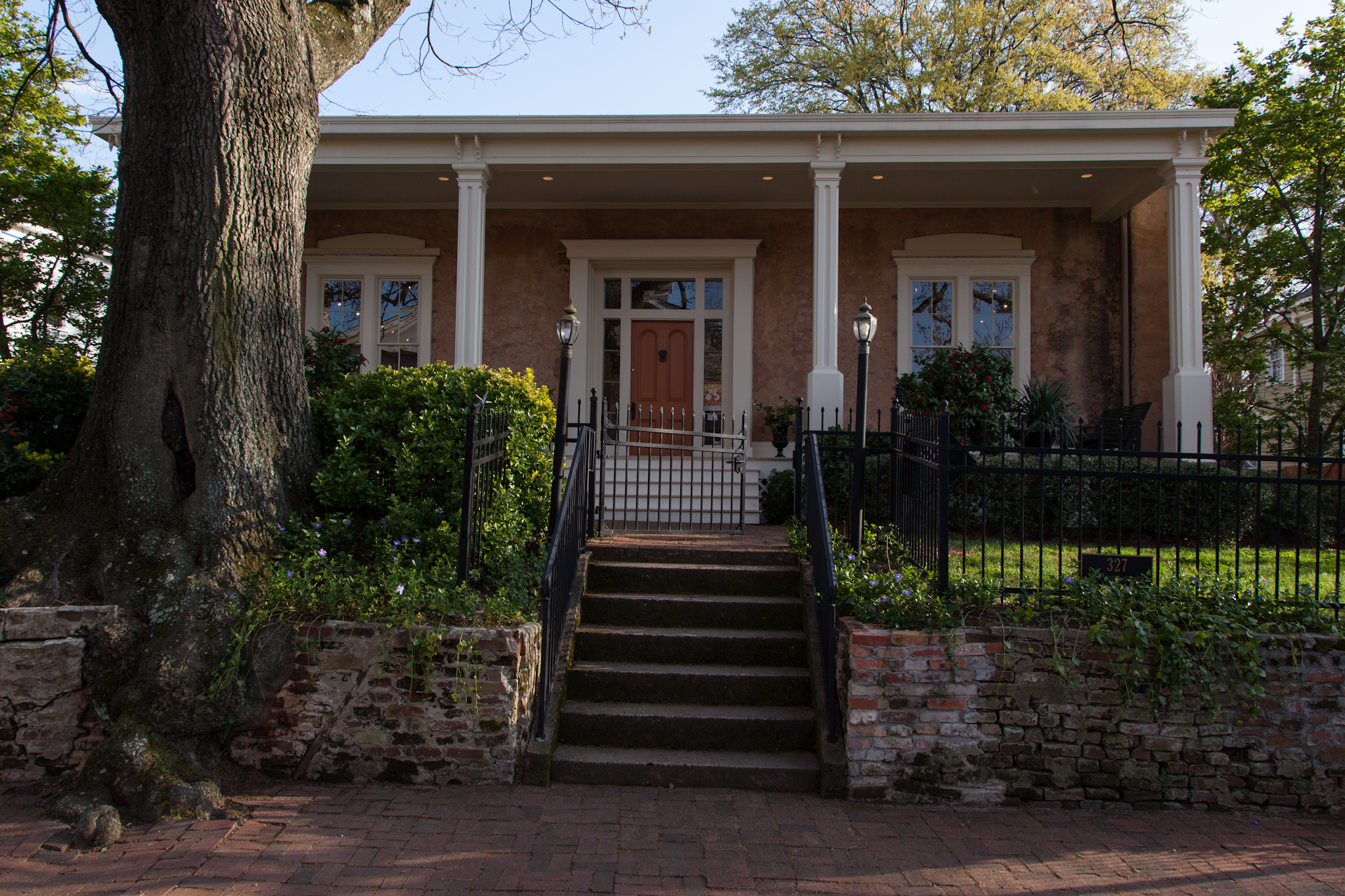
Lemuel P. Grant Mansion (1856)

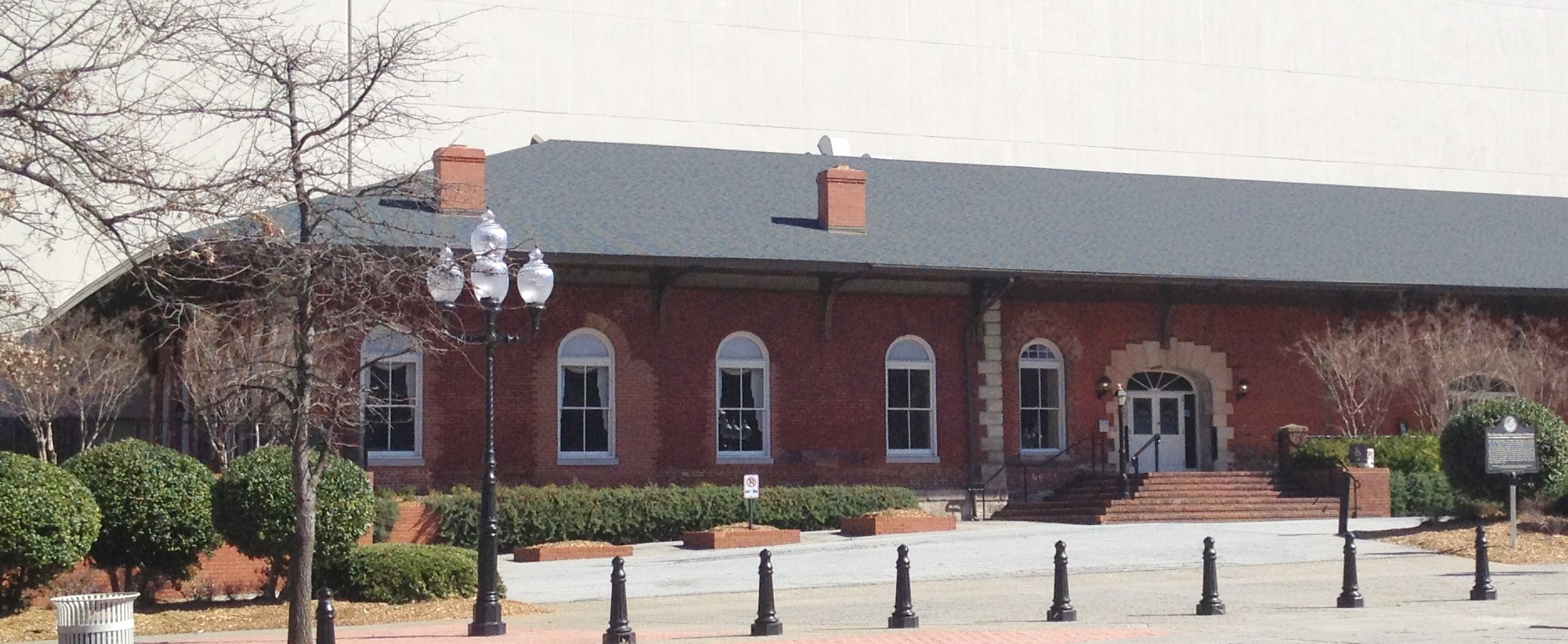
Georgia Railroad Freight Depot (1869), oldest building located within city limits when built

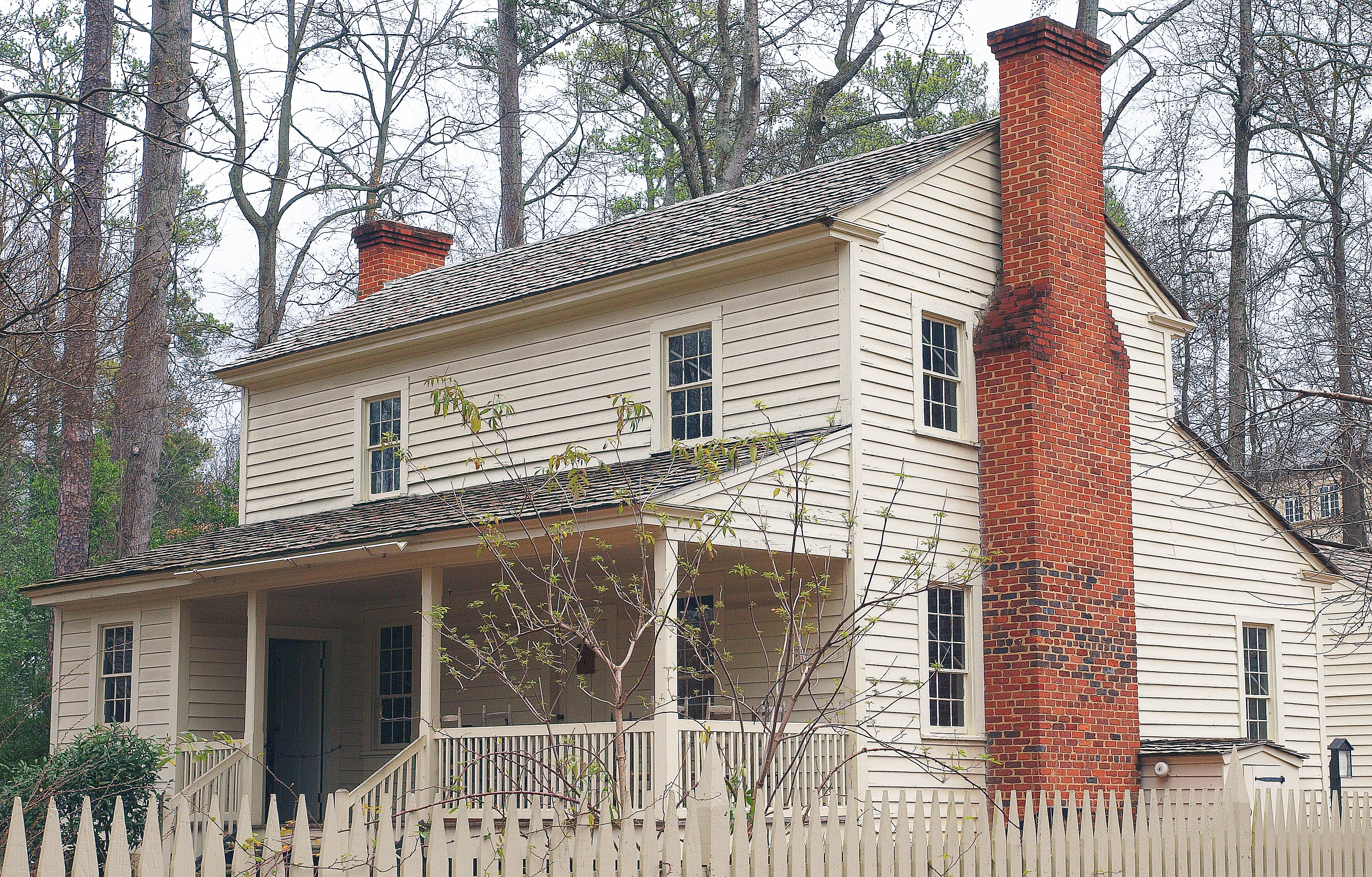
Tullie Smith House (1840), moved from original location in North Druid Hills to Atlanta

Various buildings can lay claim to the title of oldest structure in Atlanta.

The primary reason that Atlanta does not have an abundance of older structures is that the vast majority of pre-civil war buildings were destroyed in Sherman's March to the Sea, in which General William T. Sherman and his Union troops burned nearly every structure in Atlanta during the Civil War. Thus, those pre-civil war buildings that remain are heavily protected by various government programs and designations due to their scarcity.

== Oldest structures in Atlanta ==
The Oldest structures within the current city limits and still in its original location are:

- 1840 Joseph Willis House, home of early pioneer Joseph Willis and his Family, near the former Creek Indian village of Utoy in SW Atlanta. In 1864 the Home served as headquarters of Brigadier General Jacob D. Cox, commander 3rd Division US XXIII Army Corps (Army of the Ohio) during the siege of Atlanta. The "bomb proof house" written about by Cox, in which three families survived the siege of Atlanta in August 1864, still exists. Mr. Willis remarked he lived in three counties, Henry, DeKalb and Fulton and never moved a single time. His grist mill was one mile south of his home along a tributary of Utoy Creek. His closest neighbor was Atlanta's first physician, Dr. Joshua Gilbert, whose home was in the current Cascade Nature Preserve (site of the battle of Utoy Creek). Dr. Mary Edwards Walker worked in the 14th Corps Hospital behind the home in August 1864.
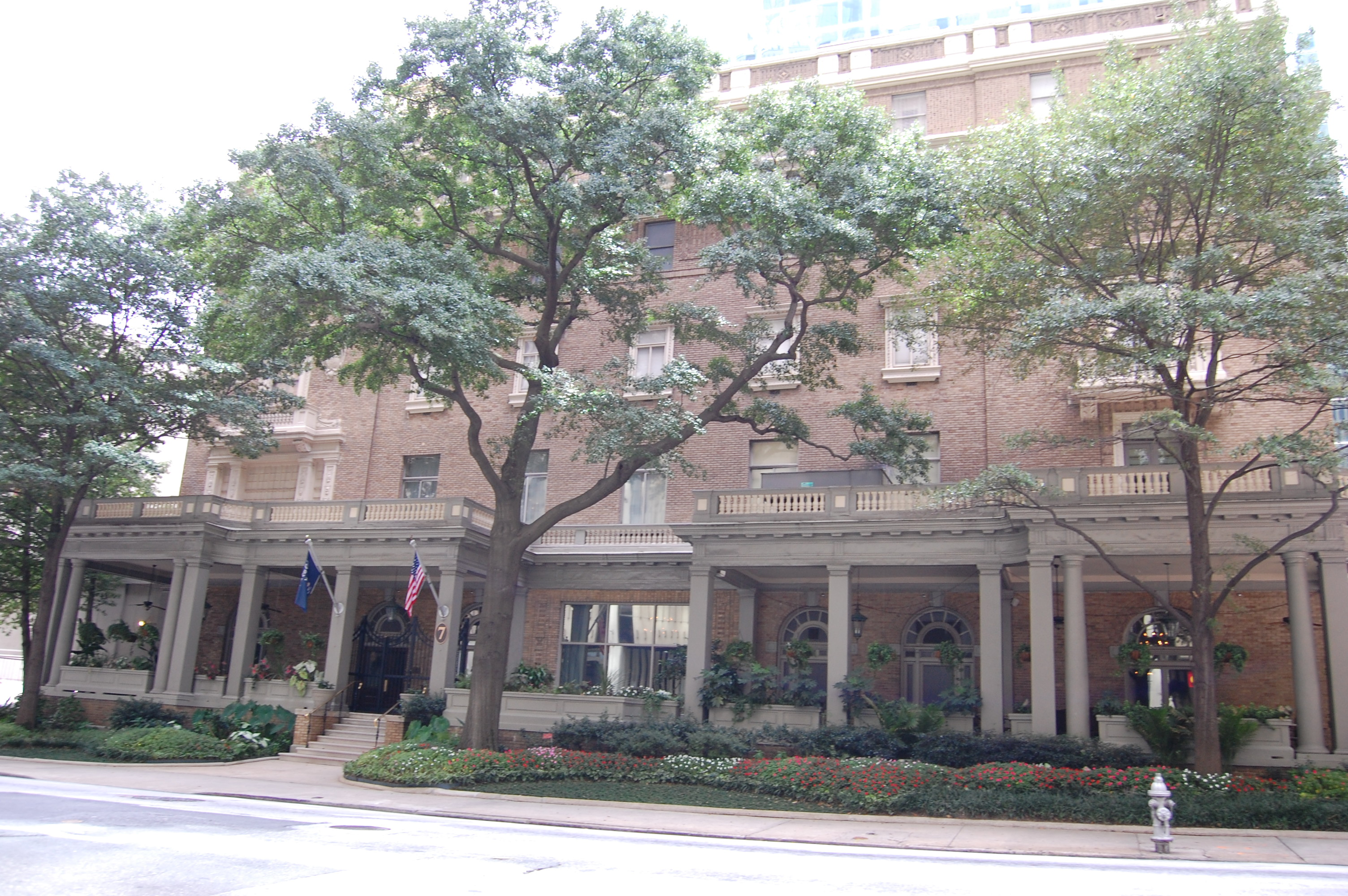
- Capital City Club (1883)
  1856 Lemuel P. Grant Mansion, home of Lemuel P. Grant, birth home of golfer Bobby Jones, once saved by Margaret Mitchell and again by the Atlanta Preservation Center – 327 St. Paul Ave. SE
- 1857 Meadow Nook, home of Col. Robert A. Alston – 2420 Alston Drive SE, East Lake, or the
- 1857–1859 Judge William Wilson House – 501 Fairburn Road SW (demolished in 2015)
- 1860 Cascade Mansion, home of Dr. William F Poole, son-in-law of Atlanta's first physician, 1530 Dodson Drive SW

As far as cemeteries are concerned, Utoy Cemetery, circa 1826, is Atlanta's oldest. Atlanta's first physician and DeKalb County's first sheriff are buried at the site. Oakland Cemetery was begun in 1850.

The oldest structure now within city limits, but which originally stood outside the current city limits is the:

- c. 1840 Tullie Smith House – Atlanta History Center, 130 West Paces Ferry Rd. NW, Buckhead (moved from North Druid Hills, DeKalb County)

== Previous oldest structures ==
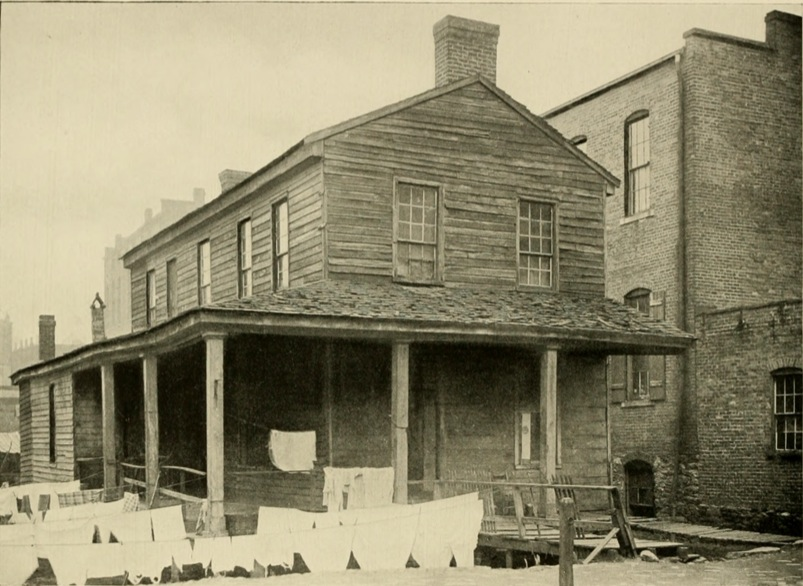
Holland House (demolished). Built in 1842 or 1848, this was the oldest house in Atlanta still standing in the early 1900s.

In the early 1900s, the oldest house in the city was the Holland House, built in 1842 or 1848. It originally had stood at the northeast corner of Whitehall (now Peachtree St. SE) and Alabama streets. It was later moved to what is now Trinity Ave., on the north side between Peachtree and Forsyth street. The site is now a parking lot.

Thereafter, one of the oldest houses in the city was the Huff House, built in 1855, upon the foundations of an older building dating from 1830. It was located at the northeast corner of Huff Road and Ellsworth Industrial Ave, overlooking the site of the Battle of Peachtree Creek. The house was razed in 1954 to build a factory on the site.

The former oldest structure with an Atlanta postal address was the Goodwin House, built in 1831. It was located at 3931 Peachtree Road in Brookhaven, Georgia, 0.5 miles (0.80 km) east of the Atlanta city limits. The house was dismantled and moved to an undisclosed location in 2016.

== Other structures notable for their age ==
- 1840 Joseph Willis House – 1571 Willis Mill Road. SW, Atlanta, GA 30311 ref Cox, Jacob Donaldson: Atlanta, published by Scribners 1880., Garrett, Franklin, Thomas: Atlanta and its Environs, 1930, Adams Park
- 1840 Tulie Smith House (Moved to Atlanta) on the site of the Atlanta Historical Society
- 1857 Judge William Wilson House 501 Fairburn Road SW, Atlanta, GA 30310
- 1857 Hammonds House Museum in West End
- 1860 Cascade Mansion, home of Dr. William F. Poole, 1530 Dodson Drive SW Atlanta, GA 30311,
- 1868 George Washington Collier home – 1649 Lady Marian Ln. NE (Ansley Park)
- 1868 Jeremiah S. Gilbert House – 2238 Perkerson Rd. SW, Perkerson, SW Atlanta
- 1869 Georgia Railroad Freight Depot – 65 Martin Luther King, Jr. Dr. SW (Underground Atlanta) – oldest existing building in Downtown Atlanta; oldest building that was within the Atlanta city limits when it was built
- 1869 Gaines Hall (Morris Brown College) – 643 Martin Luther King, Jr. Dr. SW
- 1870 Otis Thrash Hammonds home – 503 Peeples St. SW, West End, now the Hammonds House Museum
- 1870 Oldest house on tax records for Fulton County is at 3880 Thaxton Rd. SW, Atlanta, GA 30331 – Formerly Campbell County
- 1873 Shrine of the Immaculate Conception – 48 Martin Luther King, Jr. Dr. SW
- 1881 Fulton Bag and Cotton Mill – 170 Boulevard SE (Cabbagetown)
- 1882 Fountain Hall (Morris Brown College) – 643 Martin Luther King, Jr. Dr. SW
- 1882 Joel Hurt Cottage – 117 Elizabeth Ave. NE near Euclid Ave. in Inman Park
- 1882 Block Building – 90 Pryor St. SW
- 1883 Edward C. Peters House – 179 Ponce de Leon Ave. NE, Old Fourth Ward
- 1883 Capital City Club - 7 John Portman Blvd NW, Atlanta, GA 30303
- 1884 Central Presbyterian Church – 201 Washington St. SW
- 1884 Georgia State Capitol building (begun), 206 Washington St. SW
- 1885 Rockefeller Hall (Spelman College) – 350 Spelman Ln. SW
- 1885 Wren's Nest, home of Joel Chandler Harris – 1050 Ralph David Abernathy Blvd., West End
- 1888 Tech Tower, the Administration Building for Georgia Tech – 225 North Ave. NW
- 1890 Beath-Dickey House, 866 Euclid Avenue
- 1890 Westview Cemetery Main Gate – 1680 Ralph David Abernathy Blvd., Westview

== See also ==
- List of the oldest buildings in Georgia (U.S. state)
