= Ben Hill, Atlanta =

Ben Hill
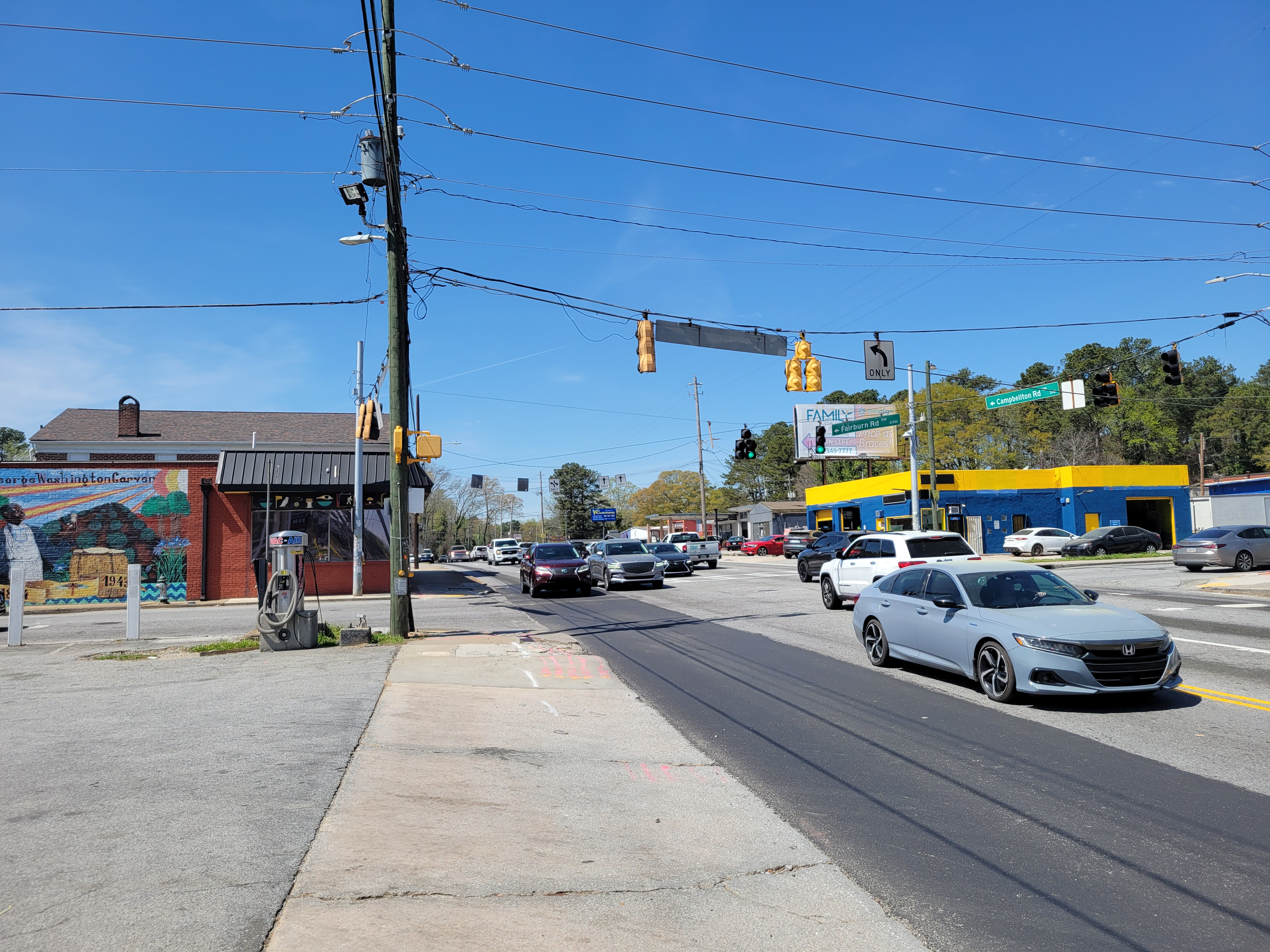
- Campbellton Road (Georgia State Route 154)

- Location of Ben Hill within Metro Atlanta
- Coordinates: 33.69061°N 84.51144°W
- Country: United States
- State: Georgia
- County: Fulton County
- City: City of Atlanta
- NPU: P

Demographics (2000)

Ben Hill is a neighborhood in the southwestern part of Atlanta, Georgia, United States.

== Location ==
Ben Hill is located within the city limits of Southwest Atlanta. Its boundaries start south at Welcome All Road, expand North to Fairburn, and ending slightly before reaching unincorporated Fulton County right before Cascade Road. Its western boundaries start at Campbellton Road at Sand Creek and extend East to Hogan Road and ends slightly after Continental Colony Elementary before entering the city of East Point.

== History ==
The Ben Hill area was first settled in the 1820s and was originally known as Mount Gilead Cross Roads. The Judge William Wilson House was located in Ben Hill, one of a handful of antebellum buildings in Atlanta. The Atlanta Preservation Center placed the NRHP-listed house on its List of Most Endangered Historic Places in 2001.

== Shopping ==
Greenbriar Mall is the most recognizable figure in this community.

== Education ==
Ben Hill is home to three elementary schools; Continental Colony, Deerwood Academy, and Fickett. It is also home to one middle school; Ralph Bunche.

== Religion ==
Mt. Gilead United Methodist Church is one of Atlanta's oldest churches. Ben Hill United Methodist Church, located at 2099 Fairburn Rd, is "reportedly the largest African American congregation of the United Methodist Church".

== Parks ==
Ben Hill has a community park, Ben Hill Park, which includes a large recreation Center, 3 ball fields and two tennis courts and outdoor basketball courts.

== Events ==
Ben Hill holds its annual reunion, Ben Hill Day, every year on the last Sunday in July. Ben Hill Day was started by lifelong citizens of Ben Hill by the name of Mr. Sherard Bunkley. This event celebrates the lives of all fallen friends and family members of the Ben Hill community. Also it is a reunion for the Ben Hill citizens which has grown to 30,000 in attendance. At this event, local celebrity Collier Hose organizes a lean drive for charity every year
