= Jeremiah S. Gilbert House =

Historic house in Georgia, United States

Coordinates: 33.693592°N 84.410829°W

- U.S. National Register of Historic Places
- Atlanta Landmark Building
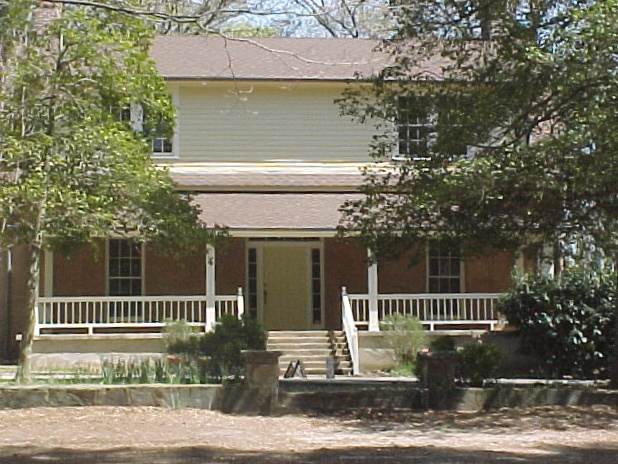

- Location within Metro Atlanta Location within Georgia Location within the United States
- Location: 2238 Perkerson Rd., SW, Perkerson, Atlanta, Georgia
- Area: 11.3 acres (4.6 ha)
- Built: 1866
- Built by: Gilbert, Jeremiah S.
- NRHP reference No.: 80001075

Significant dates
- Added to NRHP: April 17, 1980
- Designated ALB: October 14, 1989

The Jeremiah S. Gilbert House is a NRHP-listed property in the neighborhood of Perkerson, Atlanta, United States. It is one of the city's oldest surviving structures.

Jeremiah S. Gilbert was the original owner of the land which is now the Perkerson neighborhood.

The Gilbert House is described as significant as the home of one of Atlanta's earliest families, a rare example of fieldstone, mortar, and wood construction, and as a rare existing example of an Atlanta farmhouse.

After renovation in 1984, it was opened as a Cultural Arts Center operated by the City of Atlanta Office of Cultural Affairs.

The house is also designated as a City of Atlanta Landmark Site. Visitors can view original family furniture, photographs, and artifacts.
