= Fort Walker (disambiguation) =

Fort Walker, now Fort A.P. Hill, is a U.S. Army training and maneuver center near Bowling Green, Virginia.

Fort Walker may also refer to:

- Fort Walker, a Second Seminole War fort in present-day Gainesville, Florida; see List of forts in Florida
- Fort Walker (Grant Park), a Civil War-era redoubt in Georgia
- Fort Walker (Hilton Head), a Civil War-era fort in South Carolina
