= Grant Park, Atlanta =

Historic city park and neighborhood of Atlanta, Georgia, United States

- Grant Park Historic District
- U.S. National Register of Historic Places
- U.S. Historic district
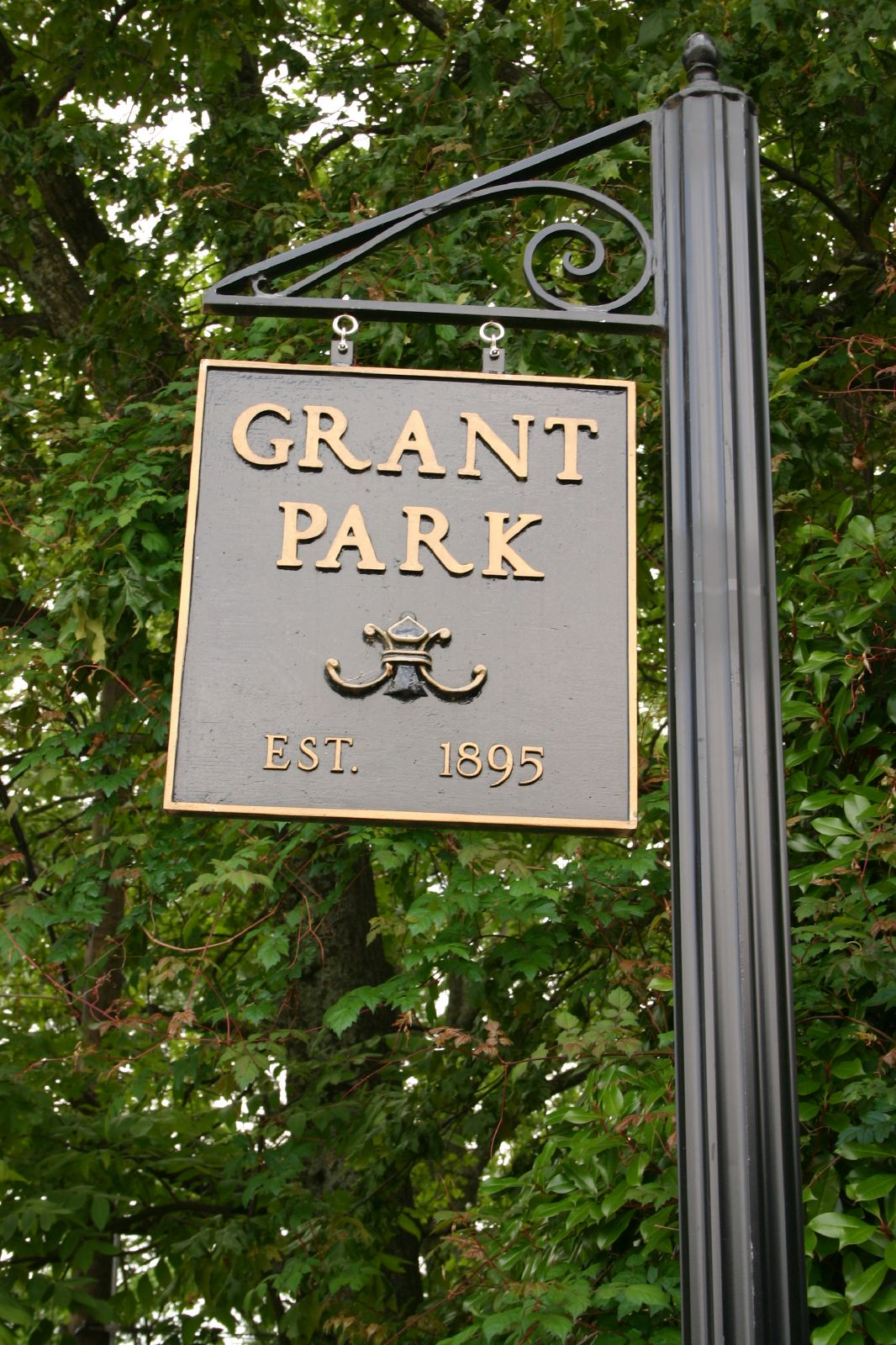

- Location within Atlanta Location within Georgia Location within the United States
- Location: Atlanta, Georgia, United States
- Coordinates: 33.736°N 84.371°W
- Built: 1858
- Architect: Olmsted Brothers
- Architectural style: Bungalow/Craftsman, Italianate, Queen Anne
- NRHP reference No.: 79000722
- Added to NRHP: July 20, 1979

Grant Park refers to the oldest city park in Atlanta, Georgia, United States, as well as the Victorian neighborhood surrounding it.

== Park ==
Grant Park is a 131-acre green space and recreational area and is the fourth-largest park in the city, behind Chastain Park, Freedom Park and Piedmont Park. Zoo Atlanta, established in 1889 and originally known as the Grant Park Zoo, is located in the park and attracts more than 1 million visitors annually.

=== History ===
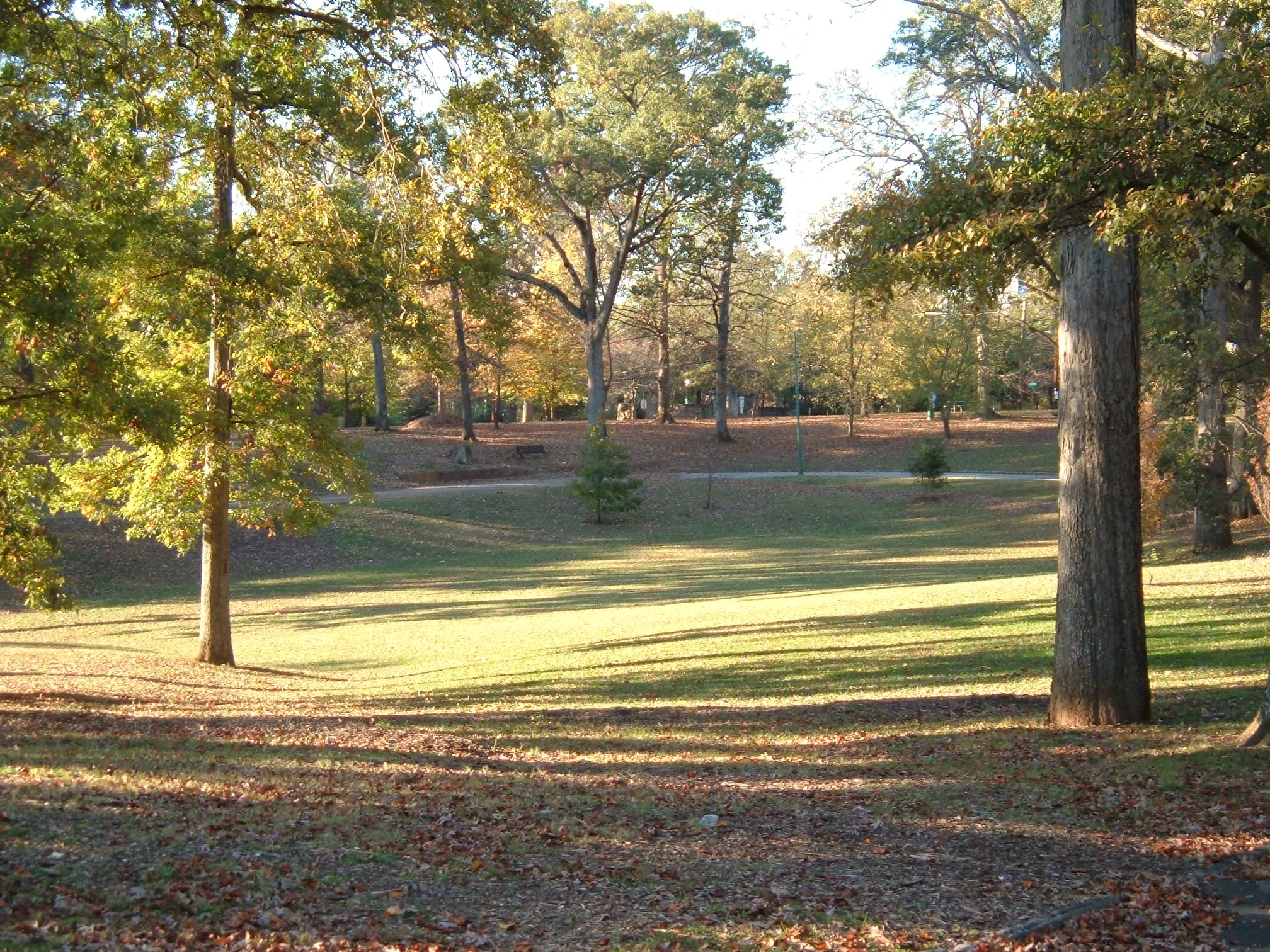
Grant Park

Grant Park was established in 1883 when Lemuel P. Grant, a successful engineer and businessman, gave the city of Atlanta 100 acres (40 ha) in the newly developed "suburb" where he lived. In 1890, the city acquired another 44 acres (18 ha) for the park and appointed its first park commissioner, Sidney Root. In 1903, the Olmsted Brothers (sons of Frederick Law Olmsted) were hired to create a plan for the park. The original park included a lake, named Lake Abana, to handle storm-water runoff.

A failed circus gave birth to the eventual Zoo Atlanta when local lumber merchant George Gress purchased animals from the circus and donated them to the city in 1889. The city decided Grant Park was the best location for the zoo and carved space out for the attraction. Later zoo expansions and parking requirements caused the removal of a portion of the lake. In 1892, the circular painting of the Battle of Atlanta was exhibited in the park. The cyclorama would eventually gain its own dedicated building in the park in 1921. Near the zoo is the Erskine Memorial Fountain, Atlanta's first public fountain, which was built in 1896 and moved to Grant Park in 1912. In 1948, another park landmark, the Thomas W. Talbot Monument, was dedicated by members of the International Association of Machinists, honoring their founder, Thomas W. Talbot.

In 1996, after years of neglect and abuse, the City of Atlanta Parks Bureau commissioned a new master plan for the park. The consultants working on the plan met with a citizen advisory group that would eventually become the Grant Park Conservancy. The Conservancy works to raise funds to enhance and protect the park for the enjoyment of all its visitors.

== Neighborhood ==
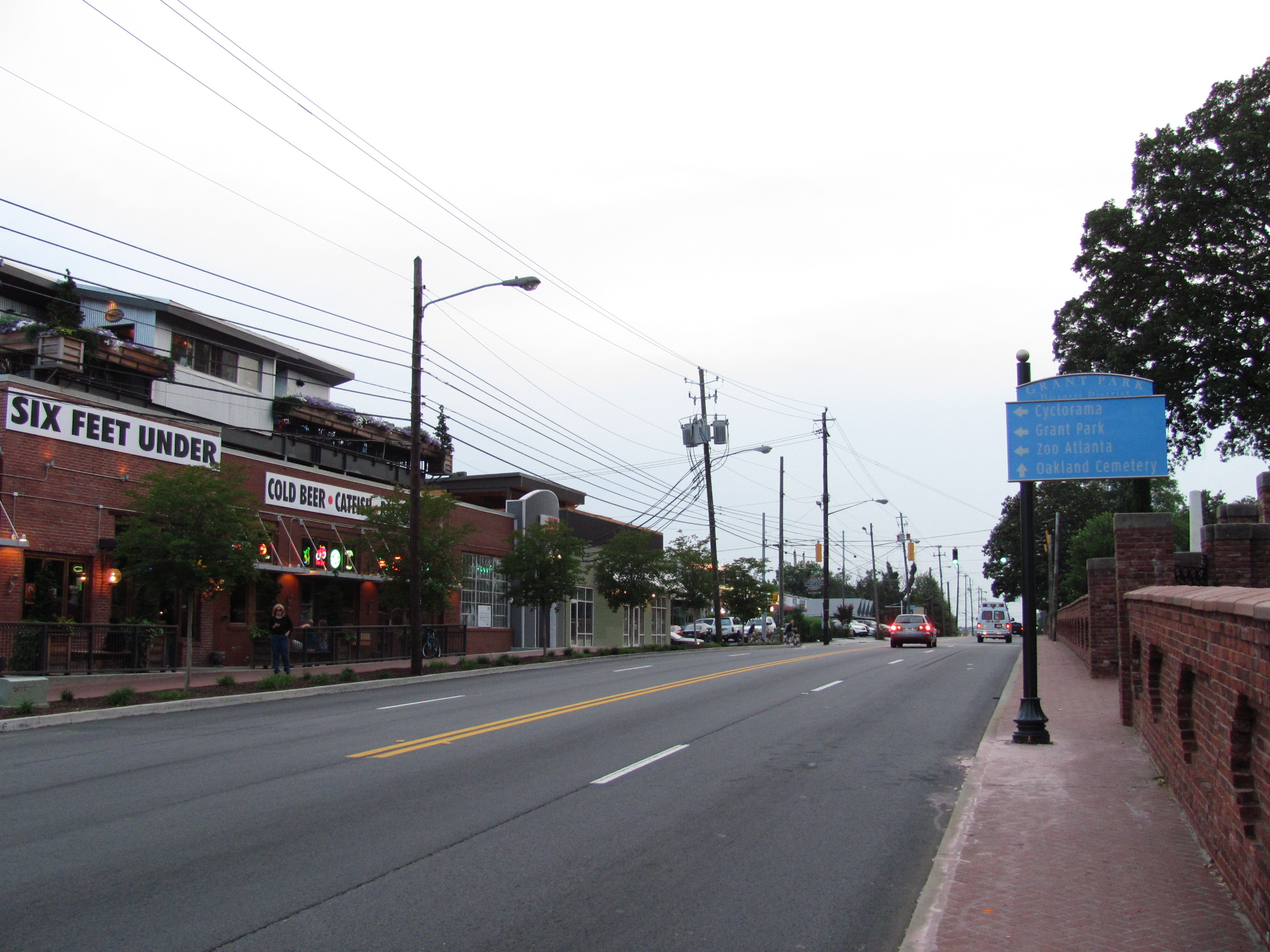
The Grant Park commercial district, near Oakland Cemetery

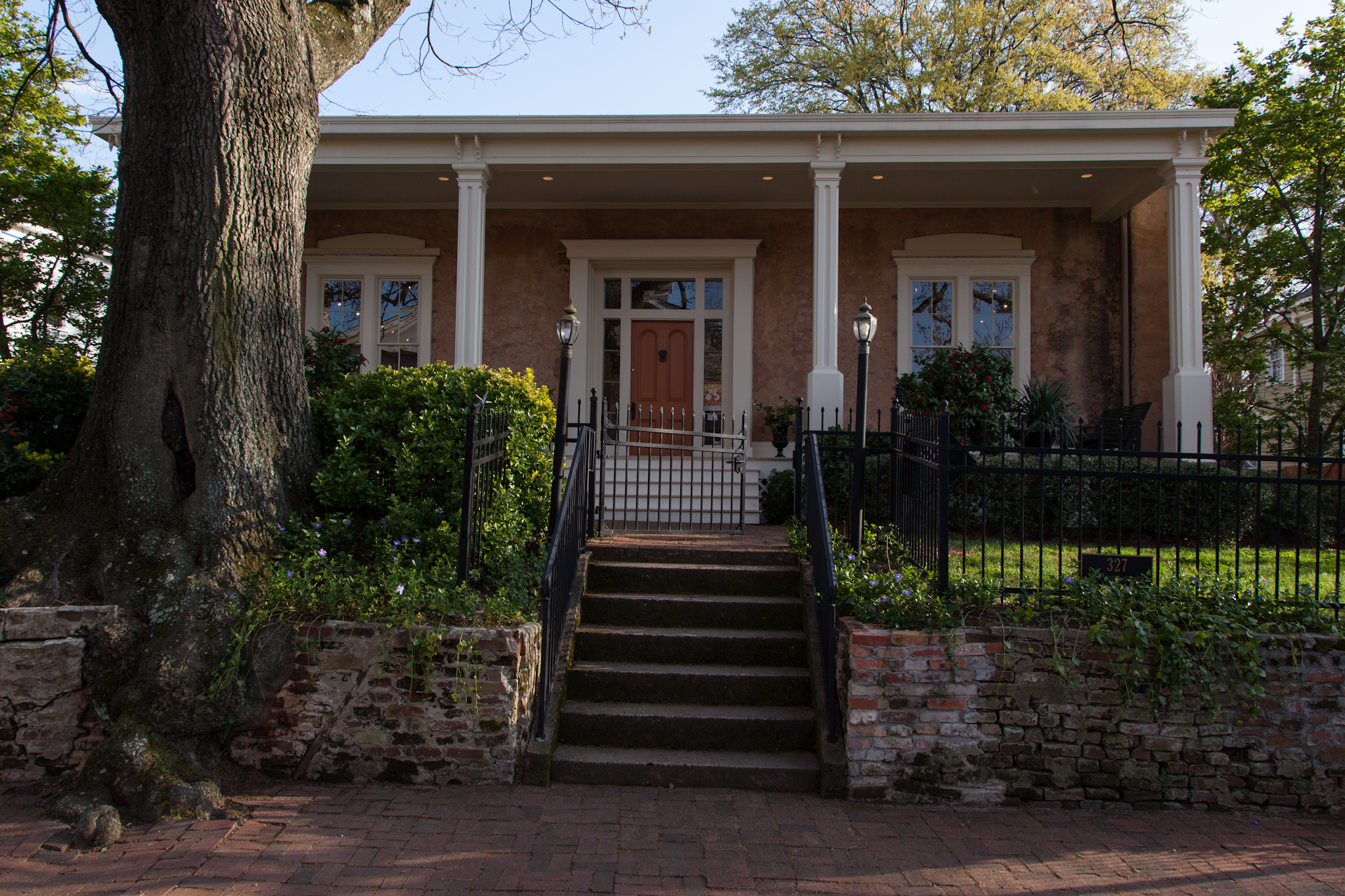
Front of the Lemuel P. Grant Mansion, second-oldest house in Atlanta

Grant Park, the intown neighborhood surrounding the park, is one of Atlanta's oldest and most important historic districts, listed on the NRHP. It is bordered by the Cabbagetown neighborhood on the north, Ormewood Park on the east, Boulevard Heights on the southeast, Chosewood Park on the south, and Summerhill and Peoplestown on the west.

It includes the park, 48 acres or 35 hectares of Oakland Cemetery (established 1850), where Margaret Mitchell, Bobby Jones, 25 former mayors of Atlanta, six former governors of Georgia, and many Civil War dead are buried. It also includes the Atlanta Stockade; Fort Walker; and the 1858 mansion of Lemuel P. Grant, for whom the park and neighborhood were named. The mansion is the oldest house still standing on its original location in Atlanta. The Grant Park Neighborhood Association represents local residents.

Together with Inman Park, Grant Park contains the largest remaining area of Victorian architecture in Atlanta. Most buildings were built between the neighborhood's founding in 1882 and the first decades of the 20th century. Large two-story mansions face the park, more modest two-story, modified Queen Anne houses were built on surrounding streets, and one-story Victorian era cottages and Craftsman bungalows were built to the east of the park.

The neighborhood is home to St. Paul United Methodist Church, which for a time in the early 1900s had the largest Methodist congregation in the Southeast. St. Paul is well known for its beautiful stained glass windows and an organ that was acquired in 1887. Each December, St. Paul, the Grant Park Cooperative Preschool (which is located on the first floor of St. Paul), and the Grant Park Parent Network host the Grant Park Candlelight Tour of Homes and Artist Market. There is also a Tour of Homes in the autumn sponsored by the Grant Park Neighborhood Association.

== Intrenchment Creek and the park's springs ==
Grant Park lies in the headwaters of Intrenchment Creek, a tributary of the South River. Atlanta straddles a subcontinental divide that runs near DeKalb Avenue, and water on the park's side of it flows toward the Ocmulgee River and the Atlantic rather than the Chattahoochee. The 2020 Intrenchment Creek One Water Management Plan lists Grant Park among the neighborhoods at the head of the basin, with Summerhill, Peoplestown, Mechanicsville, Pittsburgh and Castleberry Hill. The plan states that the creek channels of the upper basin were turned into combined sewer trunk lines after they became polluted, so the streams of the area run in pipes. The city's Clean Water Atlanta program describes its combined sewer area as including parts of east Atlanta near Grant Park.

The park's water once ran on the surface. The park occupies about 100 acres of Land Lot 43 of the Fourteenth District, deeded to the city by Lemuel P. Grant in 1883. The district survey plat of 1821, in a copy renewed in 1866, draws one stream in that lot, leaving it across its east line. The New Georgia Encyclopedia names a stream, Willow Brook, and mineral springs, of which Constitution Spring was the best known. Lake Abana lay in the park's southwest corner. Lake Loomis was built beside it in 1888, the two later merged, and in 1900 the lake was enlarged from four acres to six, with two islands. The Olmsted Brothers plan of 1903 proposed enlarging the lake to manage storm water, the only part of that plan carried out. After Willow Brook and Constitution Spring became contaminated, the city began filling the lake from its reservoir in 1906. A pool measuring 500 by 200 feet (152 by 61 m) was added in 1917. The lake and the pool were drained in the 1960s and filled for Zoo Atlanta parking. Accounts in Burnaway and Atlanta magazine attribute the draining to a decision to avoid integrating the swimming area. Salaam Spring still feeds a pond north of the zoo.

A trunk sewer ran through the park by 1912, when the city's park manager told the council's sewer committee that it overflowed in rain and left sewage across parts of the park, and that storm water from an area larger than the park itself was discharged into the park. The city's 1918 sewer program included completing the Grant Park trunk sewer to the Lloyd Street sewer. The statement of facts in a 1955 Georgia Court of Appeals opinion describes a fireman's search on July 19, 1954 for a child reported lost in a trunk sewer under the lake.

The One Water plan describes the trunk lines from the headwaters neighborhoods meeting at Atlanta Avenue, the park's southern boundary, and directing drainage southeast toward the Boulevard Regulator and the Custer Avenue combined sewer overflow facility. The Custer Avenue Combined Sewer Control Facility, built in the mid-1980s, receives wet weather flow from the Boulevard Regulator. Flows of up to 500 million US gallons a day are screened and disinfected there, and the screened flow travels by tunnel to the East Area Water Quality Control Facility. When the screens or the tunnel reach capacity, the excess is diverted around the facility into Intrenchment Creek over tipping weirs and a concrete channel. Both facilities discharge to the creek under a state permit. Below the park the creek runs in pipes and first surfaces near Boulevard Crossing Park and Chosewood Park. Within the park, the Grant Park Gateway parking deck replaced an eight-acre surface lot with a stormwater system of cisterns and infiltration trenches feeding a wet pond, holding runoff for irrigation and groundwater recharge.
