= St. Paul United Methodist Church (Atlanta) =

Methodist church in Atlanta, Georgia

Coordinates: 33°44′27.60″N 84°22′35.97″W

St. Paul United Methodist Church is located in the historic Grant Park neighborhood of Atlanta, Georgia. For a time in the early 1900s, St. Paul had the largest Methodist congregation in the Southeastern United States. The church organ was acquired at the Cotton States Exhibition in 1887. St. Paul's stained glass windows, which date back to 1907, are being refurbished. St. Paul is a main stop on tours of the Grant Park neighborhood given by the Atlanta Preservation Center. St. Paul is also home to the Grant Park Cooperative Preschool. St. Paul, the Grant Park Cooperative Preschool and the Grant Park Parent Network host the annual Grant Park Candlelight Tour of Homes, which also includes an artist marketplace and a Winter Wonderland for children. The Candlelight Tour of Homes begins at St. Paul.

== Ministries ==
The current minister of St. Paul is The Reverend Cassie Noland Rapko. St. Paul has a worship service every Sunday at 11:00 a.m. The service follows the worship style of most United Methodist churches, with liturgy, hymns, and a sermon. St. Paul has an adult Sunday School classes that meets at 10:00 a.m. It also has Sunday School classes for children of all ages at 10:00 a.m. There is a weekly youth program that meets at 5pm on Sunday evenings and various outreach projects throughout the year.

== History ==
=== Early ===
St. Paul United Methodist Church began on an Easter Sunday afternoon on April 21, 1867. On this day, a group of members from the Trinity Methodist Episcopal Church South (now Trinity United Methodist Church, located across from the Georgia State Capitol) began a mission at the old army hospital on Fair Street for wounded Civil War Veterans and their families. Such a large number of worshipers turned out for this Sunday School service that soon there was "standing room only" and the windows of the hospital were opened wide so the crowd gathered outside on the lawn could join in the singing and hear the bible stories. This special day marked the early beginnings of St. Paul UMC.

=== Hunter Street ===
Soon after, in 1870, a new church named St. Paul Methodist Episcopal South was built on Hunter Street (now Martin Luther King, Jr. Drive) and began with 63 members. After the turn of the century, the congregation had grown so large that they began planning to build a new stone church in the residential neighborhood of Grant Park, the current location of St. Paul UMC.

=== Move to Grant Park ===
Construction of the new church began in 1906. The first service was held in the new sanctuary in October 1907 and was attended by over 1,200 members. The new church, constructed out of blocks of granite, was built in the Neo-Romanesque style and included intricate stained glass windows depicting the Resurrection and other biblical scenes. The large pipe organ, still in use today after being refurbished in the early 1990s, was acquired from the Piedmont Cotton States Exhibition in 1887. Interior details include cove ceilings, decorative columns and capitals, paneled woodwork, and original heart pine wood floors.

=== 1920s through 40s ===
By 1921, St. Paul Methodist Episcopal Church had 2,345 members all living within walking distance to the church. In the late 1920s, the three-story brick education building was added for Sunday School classes and group meals. Throughout the 1930s and into the 1940s the Grant Park neighborhood thrived and was considered one of the best middle-class neighborhoods in the city. At the end of World War II in 1945, there was a national trend for families to move away from the cities into the suburbs, which began the decline of the area.

=== Post World War II ===
Major construction of Interstate 20, 75/85, and the stadium claimed more homes and displaced families, virtually cutting Grant Park in half and sending more long-time residents to the suburbs. By the early 1970s, one member described Grant Park as a "neighborhood of sinking ships." But the resilient spirit of St. Paul UMC and the neighborhood shone through these days as "urban pioneers" began moving into the area, attracted by the unique old homes and historical charm of Grant Park. This diverse new community fearlessly began tackling community issues like crime and education, and soon began turning the neighborhood around into the thriving place it is today.

=== 1980 to present ===
In 1980, The Grant Park Learning Center was formed to provide childcare to families in the area, and was housed in the St. Paul UMC education building. In 1985 a predawn fire razed this building, and the congregation and community rallied together to rebuild the Learning Center which was completed in 1987. In the early 1990s the sanctuary was in need of renovation, most apparent by the falling plaster over the heads of the congregation. Faced with closing the church for good or raising repair funds, the small congregation chose to raise the needed funds to keep the doors of St. Paul UMC open. Repairs began in the spring of 1991 with a new roof, refinishing walls, floors, and pews, and reworking areas of the sanctuary to fit the church's new space needs for meeting areas. The lettering frieze around the ceiling perimeter was selected by the congregation and painted by church members. In April 1994 the work was complete and the congregation resumed worship on Palm Sunday. Ongoing restoration projects continue as members of the congregation preserve the beauty and history of St. Paul UMC.
