= Thomas W. Talbot =

American Machinist

Thomas Wilson Talbot
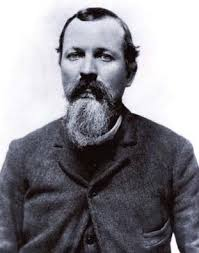

1st Grand Master Machinist (President) International Association of Machinists
- In office May 5, 1888 – 1890
- Preceded by: None
- Succeeded by: James J. Creamer

Personal details
- Born: April 27, 1849 Chesterfield County, South Carolina, U.S.
- Died: March 7, 1892 (aged 42) Florence, South Carolina, U.S.
- Cause of death: Murdered
- Resting place: Mount Hope Cemetery- Florence, South Carolina, U.S.
- Spouse: Keitt Brooks Hauser (m. 1872)

Thomas W. Talbot (April 27, 1849 – March 7, 1892) was an American machinist, trade unionist, founder and first president of the International Association of Machinists and Aerospace workers (IAM). Talbot served as the IAM's grand master machinist (president) from the IAM's founding on May 5, 1888 until his resignation in 1890.

== Early life ==
Talbot was born on a farm in Chesterfield County, South Carolina on April 27, 1849. Talbot married his wife Keitt Brooks Hauser on December 3, 1872.

== Founding of the Machinists Union ==
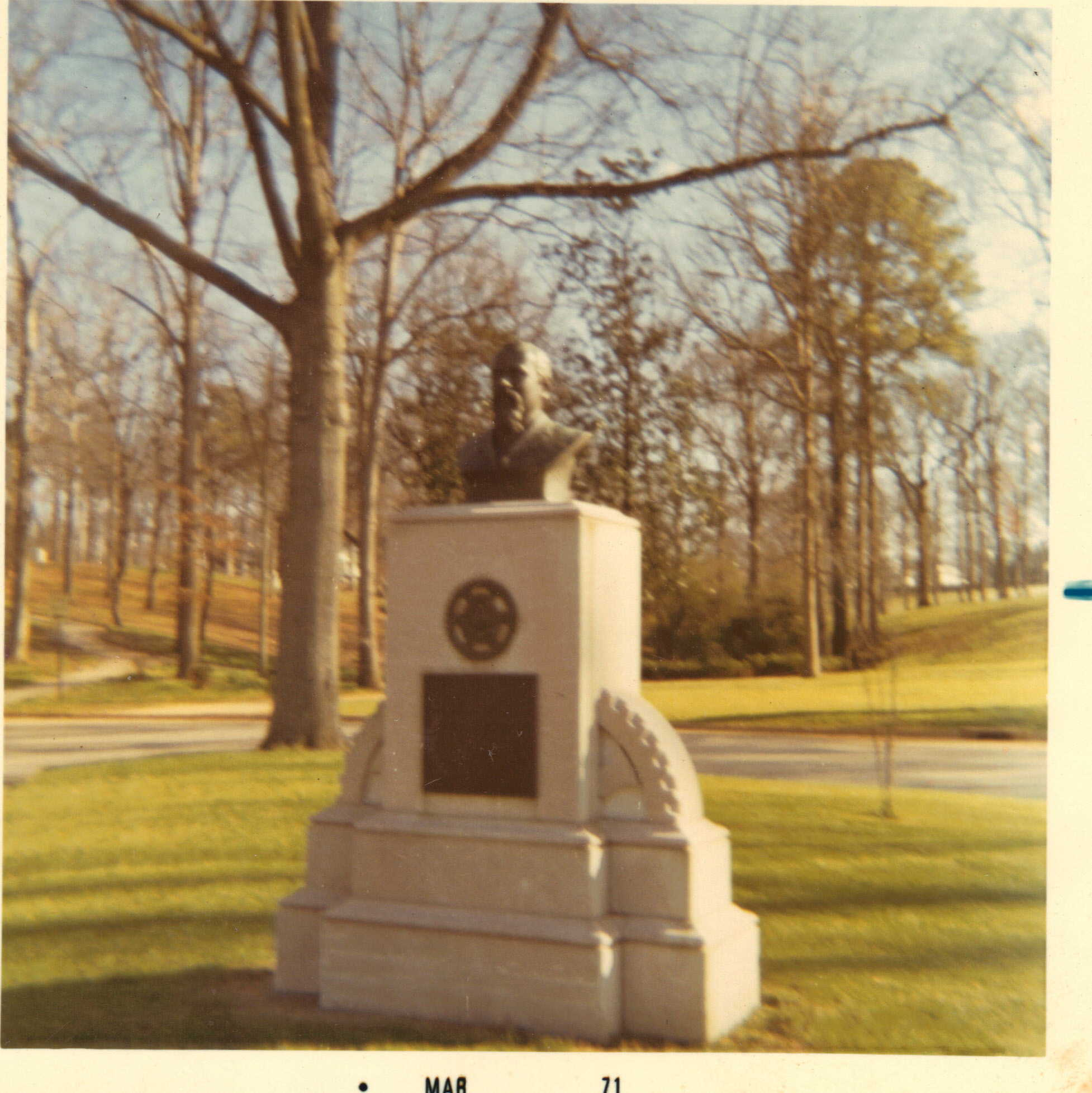
Thomas W. Talbot Monument in Grant Park, Atlanta, Georgia

Talbot was working as a Machinist in the Atlantic Coastline Railway shops, at Florence, South Carolina under deplorable conditions and for very small wages when he conceived the idea of organizing the Machinists for the purpose of improving their conditions through cooperation and collective action.

After repeated efforts and many meetings held at the homes of various Machinists, a local organization was formed one night at the home of a Machinist named Green. This was in the early 1880s. Shortly after forming this organization Talbot was discharged by his employer for his Union activities. After leaving the Atlantic Coastline Railroad, Talbot moved around for a while until he landed a job at the Southern Railway in Atlanta Georgia. Upon leaving Florence, the lodges he had formed fell apart in the absence of his influence. Soon after going to work in Atlanta, Talbot began talking of organizing to his shop mates with the result that on May 5, 1888 Mike Riley, Henry Garrett and 16 other machinists along with Talbot got together in the "drop pit" and formed Lodge 1 of The National Association of Machinists later The International Association of Machinists and now The International Association of Machinists and Aerospace Workers.

On May 5, 1948 The Machinists Union dedicated the Thomas W. Talbot Monument in Grant Park in Atlanta Georgia recognizing the work he had done in founding their Union.

== Death ==
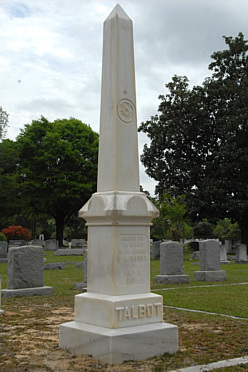
Monument of Thomas Wilson Talbot

Talbot was murdered in March 1892 by in Brothers Will and Charles Barrenger in the streets of Florence, South Carolina.

Talbot is buried at Mount Hope Cemetery in Florence, South Carolina.

== Quotes ==
"There is dignity in labor that carries with it respect, both the labor of the hands and of the head - providing for our bodily wants as well as toiling to develop some enterprise of world-wide reputation" - Tom Talbot February 1889, Journal of United Machinists and Mechanical Engineers.
