= Thomas W. Talbot Monument =

Public monument in Atlanta, Georgia

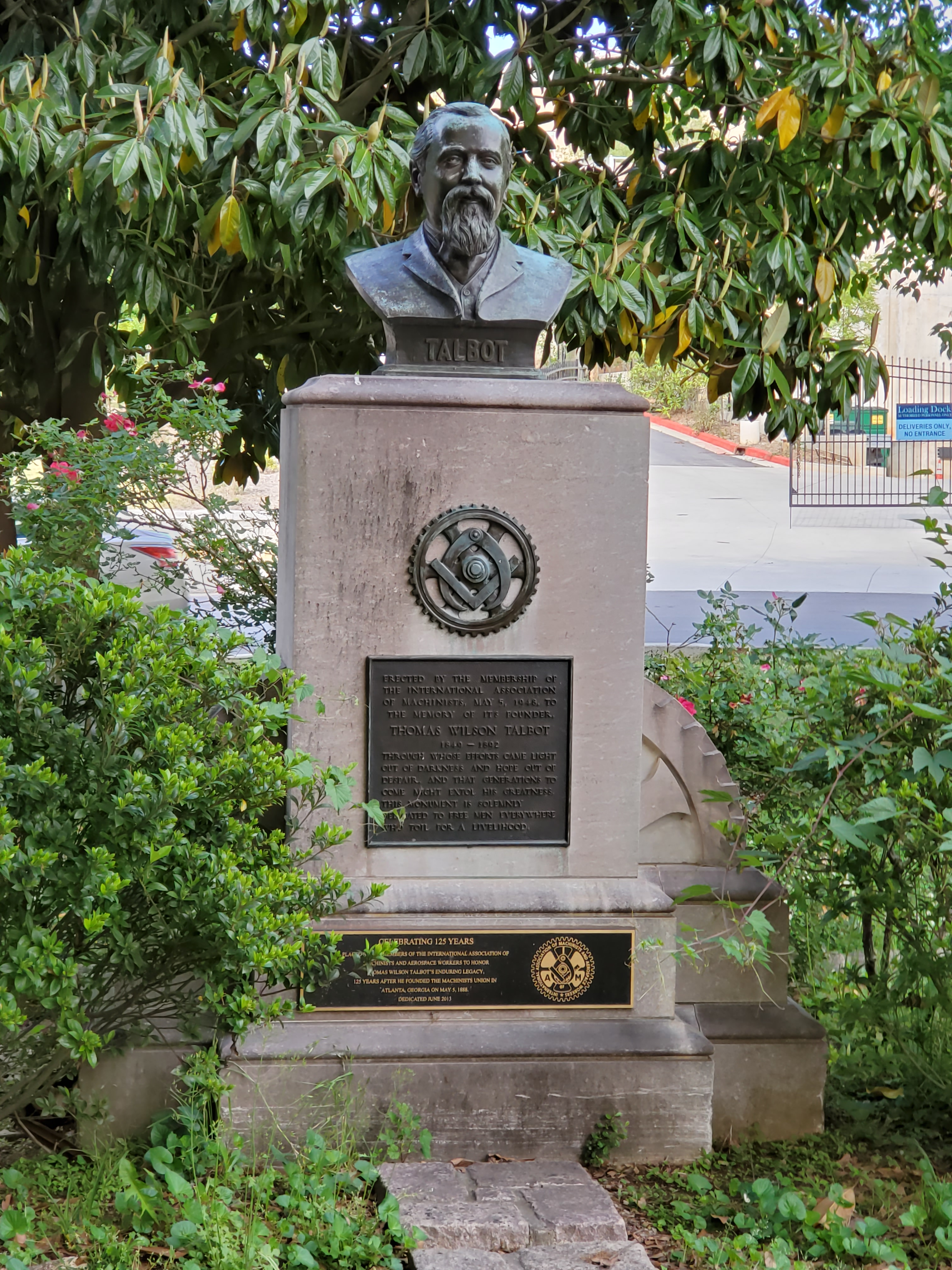
- The monument in 2021
- Location: Grant Park, Atlanta, Atlanta, Georgia, United States
- Coordinates: 33°44′4″N 84°22′19″W
- Material: Tennessee marble Bronze
- Dedicated date: May 5, 1948
- Dedicated to: Thomas W. Talbot

The Thomas W. Talbot Monument is a public monument dedicated to Thomas W. Talbot in Atlanta, Georgia, United States. Located in Grant Park, the monument was dedicated in 1948 to Talbot, who had founded what is now the International Association of Machinists and Aerospace Workers in the city in 1888.

== History ==
On May 5, 1888, railroad machinist Thomas W. Talbot, along with 18 other machinists, organized a labor union that would later become known as the International Association of Machinists and Aerospace Workers (IAM) in Atlanta, Georgia. Talbot would die several years later in 1892. In May 1948, on the 60th anniversary of the founding of the union, the union dedicated this monument to their founder. The statue was dedicated on May 5 of that year, in a dedication ceremony attended by a grandson and great grandson of Talbot's, with then-IAM president Harvey W. Brown giving a dedication speech. Over 1,500 IAM members attended the anniversary celebrations in Atlanta. The location for the monument, Grant Park, was chosen due to its prominence in the city, and today the area is a plaza near an entrance for Zoo Atlanta.

In 2013, to celebrate the union's 125th anniversary, a new plaque was dedicated for the statue. The IAM local from Marietta, Georgia hosted the event.

== Design ==
The monument consists of a bronze bust of Talbot resting atop a pedestal made of Tennessee marble. Attached to the pedestal is a bronze logo of the IAM and a plaque that reads:

Erected by the membership of the International Association of Machinists, May 5, 1948, to the memory of its founder Thomas Wilson Talbot, 1849-1892, through whose efforts came light out of darkness and hope out of despair. And that generations to come might extol his greatness, this monument is solemnly dedicated to free men everywhere who toil for a livelihood.

The 2013 plaque attached to the statue reads:

CELEBRATING 125 YEARS, Placed by the members of the International Association of Machinists and Aerospace Workers to honor Thomas Wilson Talbot's enduring legacy, 125 years after he founded the Machinists Union in Atlanta Georgia on May 5, 1888. Dedicated June 2013.

== See also ==
- 1948 in art
