= Fort Walker (Grant Park) =

Coordinates: 33°43.835′N 84°22.129′W

Fort Walker was a Civil War redoubt located on what is now the southeastern corner of Grant Park in Atlanta, Georgia.

== History ==
The redoubt was built by Confederate forces in 1863.

Part of a 13-mile long line of defenses around the city, it originally was unnamed (other than a single letter to differentiate from other positions on the line), but was renamed for Major General William H.T. Walker after he was killed during the Battle of Atlanta.

After Grant Park was established in the 1880s, a granite pedestal, a collection of four cannon, and two bronze lions commemorated the site of the fort. After years of vandalism by park visitors, the cannon were removed in the late 1980s, and one was stolen. The pair of bronze lions also went missing. Today, only a state historic marker remains. It reads:

Southeastern salient of Atlanta's inner line of fortifications erected during the Summer & Fall of 1863. The line consisted of a cordon of redoubts on hills connected by rifle pits encircling the city, aggregating some 10.5 miles of earthworks designed & supervised by Col. L. P. Grant, pioneer citizen, construction engineer & railroad builder of Atlanta.

After 93 years, it is one of a few remnants of a line that withstood the quartering steel & climbing fire of Federal armies forty-two days -- evacuated only when the remaining R.R. was cut.

In 1938, the Atlanta Ladies Memorial Association dedicated a small monument in commemoration of the Battle of Atlanta and the significance of Fort Walker as the last remaining breastworks in the city. In late 2014, the monument was rededicated with a replacement granite cannon and a new plaque given by the Georgia Division of the United Daughters of the Confederacy.
