= Ben Hill Park =

Coordinates: 33°41′19.18″N 84°30′46.81″W

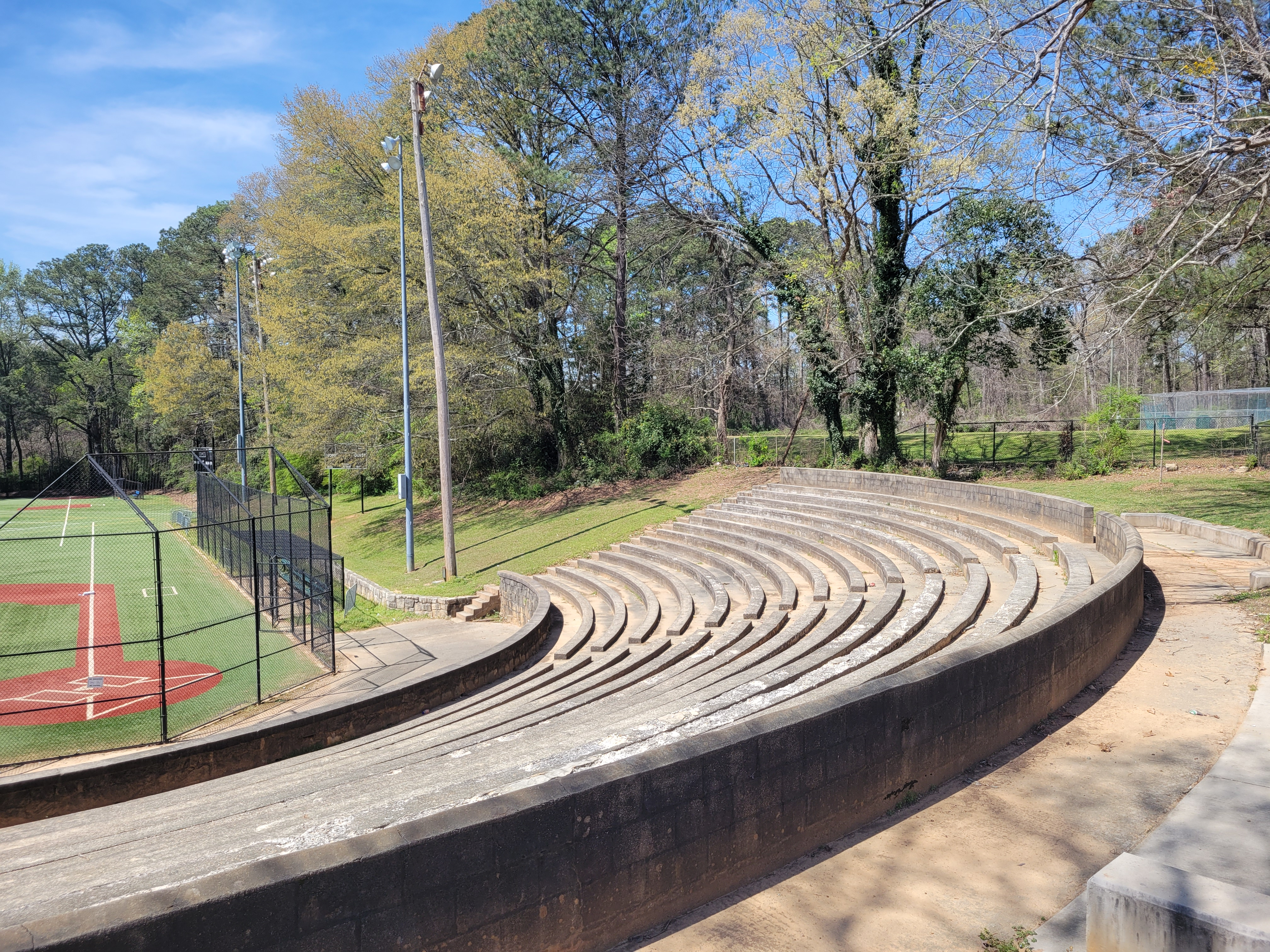
Concrete grandstand in Ben Hill Park

Ben Hill Park is a 13.66-acre (55,300 m^{2}) community park in the Ben Hill neighborhood of southwest Atlanta, Georgia.

It includes one recreation center, one covered basketball court, two tennis courts, and one multipurpose baseball/football field. The recreation center was later renamed to William Walker Recreation Center, in honor of the longtime director, William Walker.
