= Lemuel P. Grant Mansion =

Historic house in Georgia, United States

Coordinates: 33.740597°N 84.376856°W

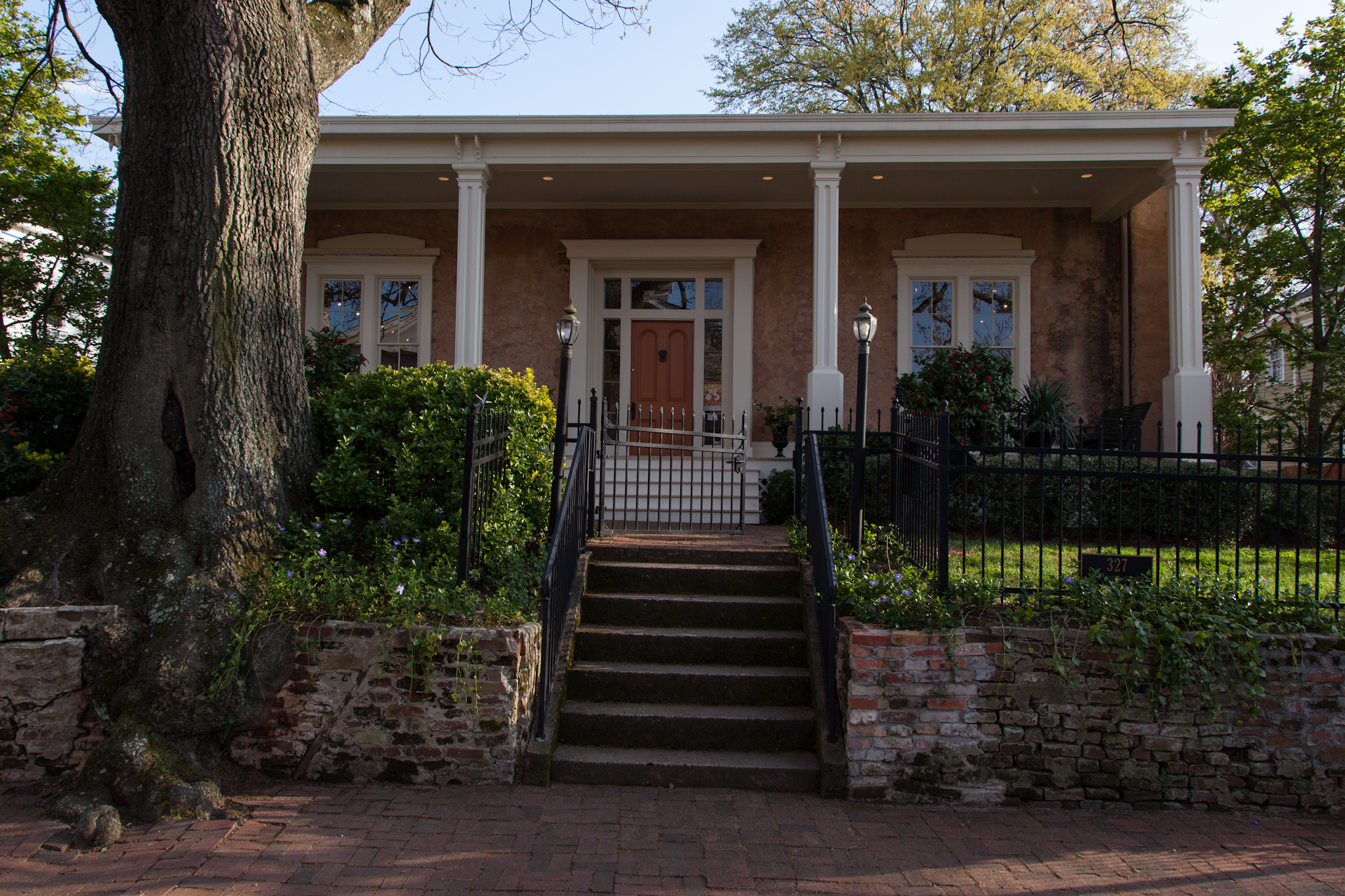
Front of the Grant Mansion

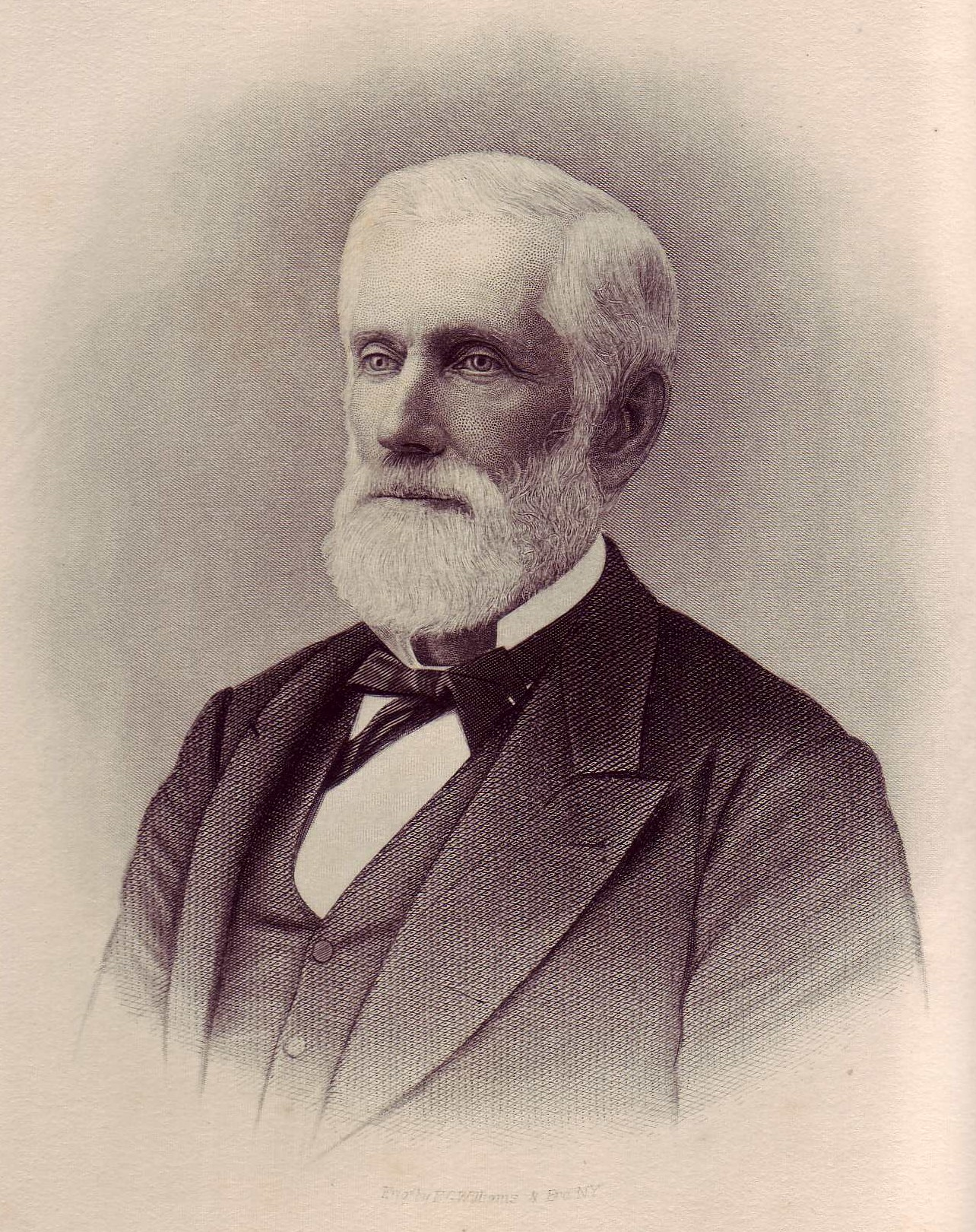
Lemuel P. Grant

The Lemuel P. Grant Mansion is a historic house located on St. Paul Avenue between Broyles and Grant streets in the Grant Park neighborhood of Atlanta. It is one of only three antebellum houses in the city of Atlanta still standing in their original locations. It is also by far the closest to what were in the 1860s the Atlanta city limits. The mansion was owned by Lemuel P. Grant, Atlanta's quintessential railroad man as well as a major landowner and civic leaderafter. Grant donated the land for Grant Park, which was named for him.

The three-story, Italianate mansion was built in 1856. The house was constructed of buff stucco with 2-foot (61 cm) wide walls, 10-foot (3.0 m) windows, nine fireplaces and a ballroom.

== Civil War ==
Union troops did not burn the house during the burning of Atlanta in 1864, despite the fact that it had been used as a Confederate hospital, because they found Masonic paraphernalia in the house, and troops had been instructed not to harm the houses of Masons.

== 20th century ==
In 1902, golf legend Bobby Jones was born here. The house was later a passion of Gone with the Wind author Margaret Mitchell. Beginning in the 1940s, neglect and fires damaged the mansions; it remained without its four porches and second story, and so part of the first floor was open to the elements.

== Restoration ==
In December 2001, the Atlanta Preservation Center purchased the house for $109,000; the house at the time scheduled to be demolished to build two new homes. The center moved its headquarters there in February 2002. In 2006 it completed the stabilization of the mansion's walls and in 2007 purchased an adjoining lot. Restoration of, and improvements to the house and grounds are ongoing. The Center has spent over $1 million on its restoration as of 2023.
