= Ben Hill United Methodist Church =

Coordinates: 33.69780046277342°N 84.51033669502212°W

Ben Hill United Methodist Church is a United Methodist Church in the predominantly Black neighborhood of Ben Hill, Atlanta, in the US state of Georgia. It started in 1853 in a log cabin and was called "Wesley Chapel". The congregation moved to Ben Hill in 1926, and when in the 1960s that neighborhood become mostly Black, the church chose to accept that and integrate. By 1974 the church had become predominantly Black, with Cornelius Henderson as its first Black pastor, and the church grew--from 400 members in 1974 to 4,000 in 1986. Under his successor, Walter Kimbrough Sr., that membership increased to 6,000 by 1989, making Ben Hill UMC "reportedly the largest African American congregation of the United Methodist Church". Its "spiritual awakening and phenomenal numerical growth" are ascribed to its incorporation of "African traditions of call and response" and a neo-Pentecostal style.

== Notable church leaders ==
- Cornelius Henderson, former president of Gammon Theological Seminary; later bishop, and member of World Policy Council
- Walter Kimbrough Sr., former pastor (1974- ) of Cascade United Methodist Church, father of Walter Kimbrough (Jr.)
