= Hammonds House Museum =

Art museum in Atlanta, Georgia, U.S.

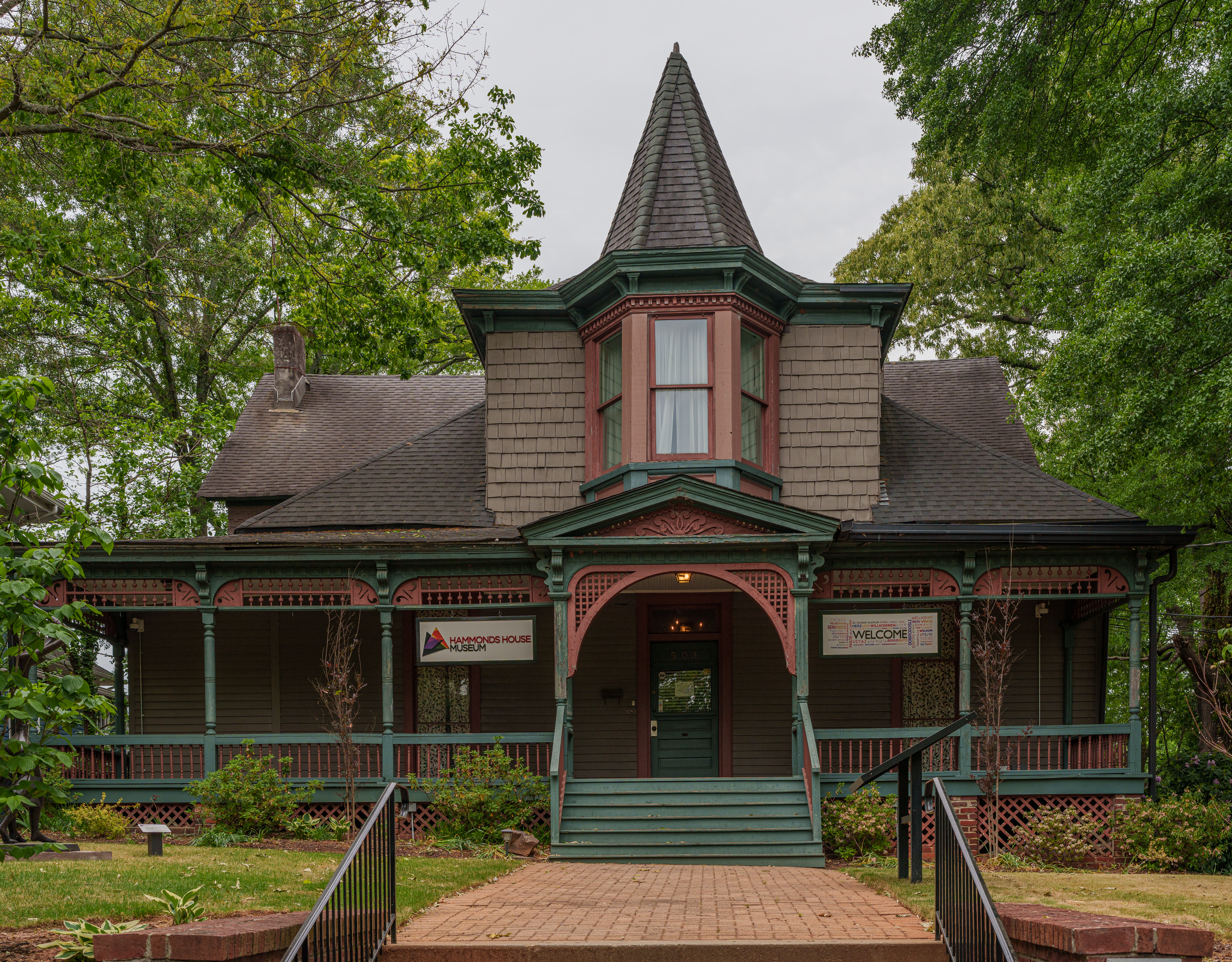
- Hammonds House Museum in 2026
- Established: February 27, 1988; 38 years ago
- Location: Atlanta, Georgia
- Coordinates: 33.741215°N 84.42076°W
- Type: Art museum
- Website: www.hammondshousemuseum.org

The Hammonds House Museum is a fine art museum for African American art, established in 1988 and located in the West End neighborhood of Atlanta, Georgia, United States. The mission of the museum is to preserve, display, interpret and increase awareness about visual artists of African descent. The museum has a permanent collection, as well as offering temporary exhibitions and art classes.

It is located in the 1857 Victorian house at 503 Peeples Street SW, the former residence of Dr. Otis Thrash Hammonds, a prominent Atlanta physician and patron of the arts. The Victorian house is believed to have been built in 1857, and to be one of the three oldest houses in West End.

Former executive directors of the museum include Myrna Anderson-Fuller and Leatrice Ellzy Wright. Kevin Sipps has served long term as a curator of the museum.

== See also ==
- List of museums focused on African Americans
- List of oldest structures in Atlanta
