= Holland House (Atlanta) =

Building in Georgia, United States

Coordinates: 33.750077°N 84.394314°W

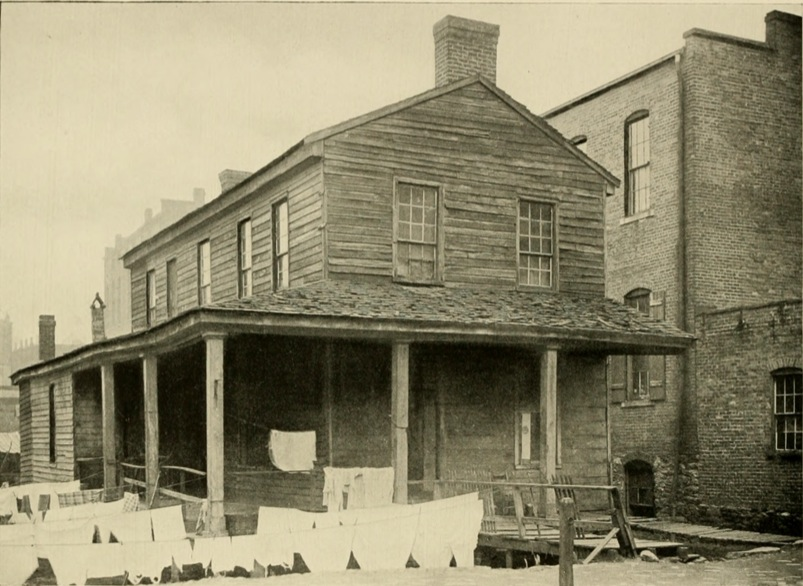
Holland House (demolished). Built in 1842 or 1848, this was the oldest house in Atlanta still standing in the early 1900s.

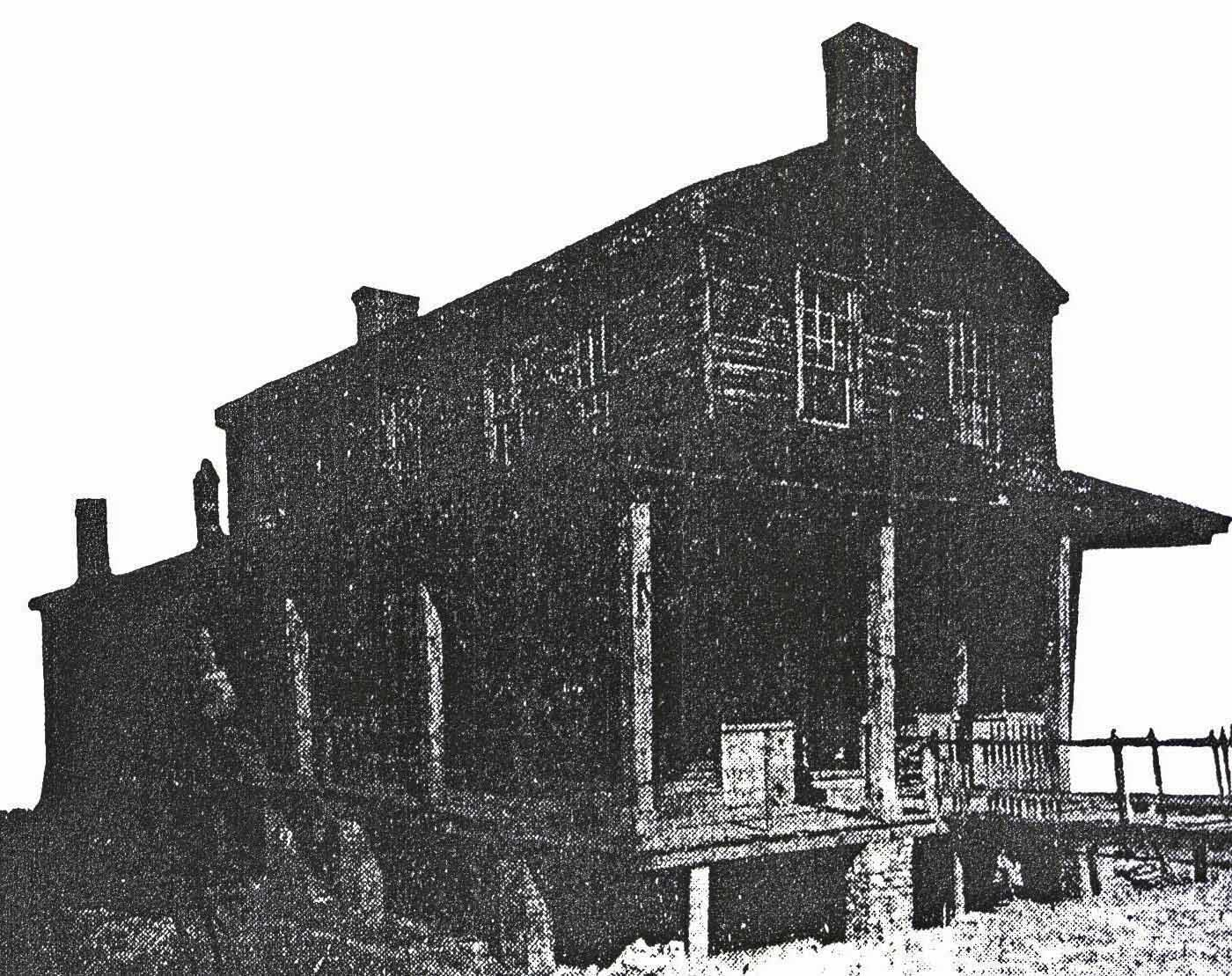
1902 image from the Atlanta Journal

Holland House was a house in Atlanta, which, in the early 1900s, was the oldest house standing in the city. Different sources state that it was built in 1842 or 1848. It originally had stood at the northeast corner of Whitehall (now Peachtree St. SE) and Alabama streets, at the rear of the Republic Block.

After its construction, it was sold to Edward W. Holland (b. 1807), a hotel owner, and of the candy manufacturing firm Jack & Holland, who then passed it along to his son.

It was used by the engineers and other officers of the Western and Atlantic Railroad and it labeled in an 1881 book as the Engineer's Office. Later it was used as a boarding house - the first in Atlanta.

The building was later moved to Peters Street (now Trinity Street), across from Trinity Church (which stood at the SW corner of Whitehall, now Peachtree St. SW - this would place the Holland House on the northeast side of today's Trinity Ave. between Peachtree and Forsyth). The site is now part of a parking lot.
