= Lemuel Grant =

American engineer and businessman

L.P. Grant
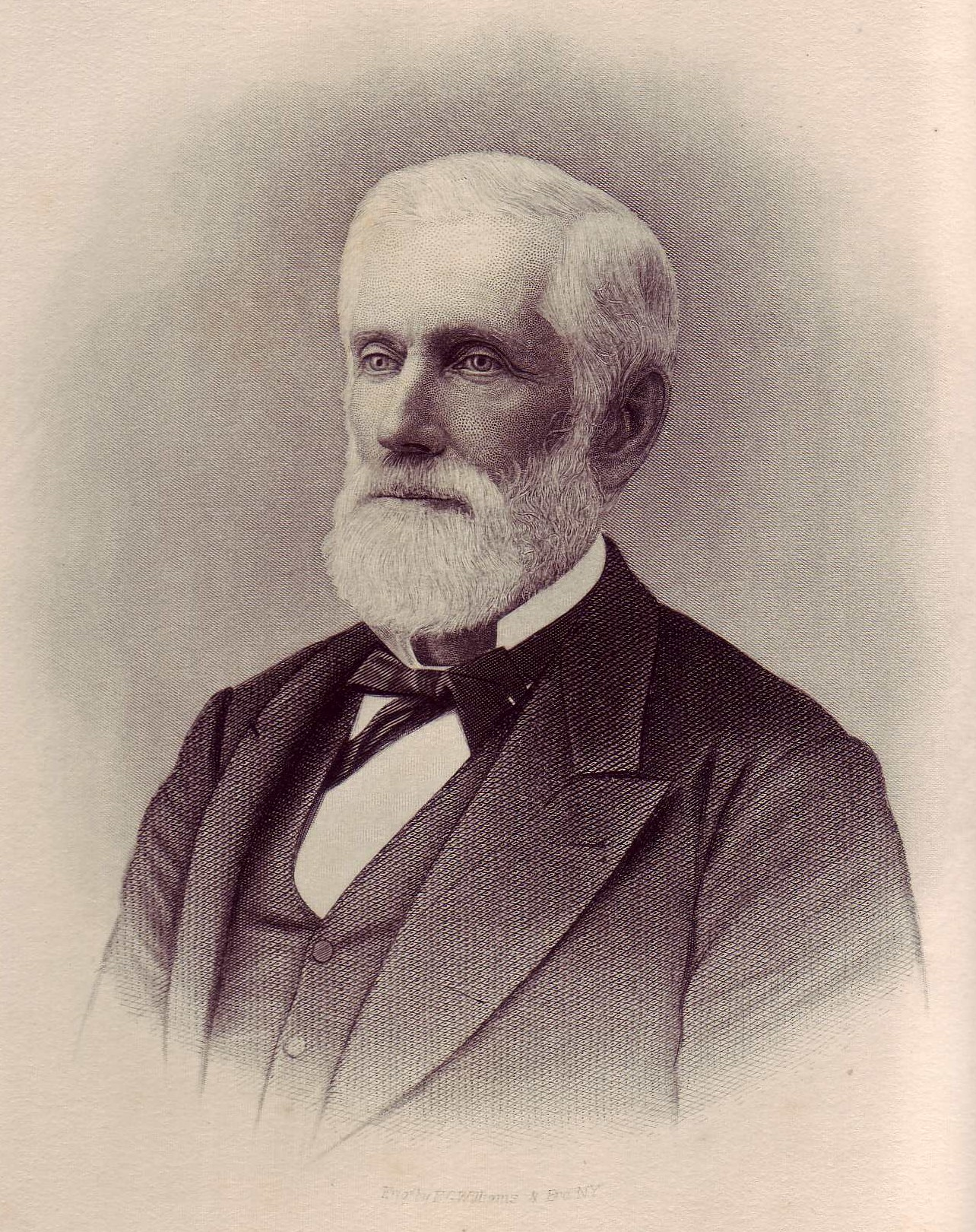

Personal details
- Born: August 11, 1817
- Died: January 11, 1893 (aged 75)
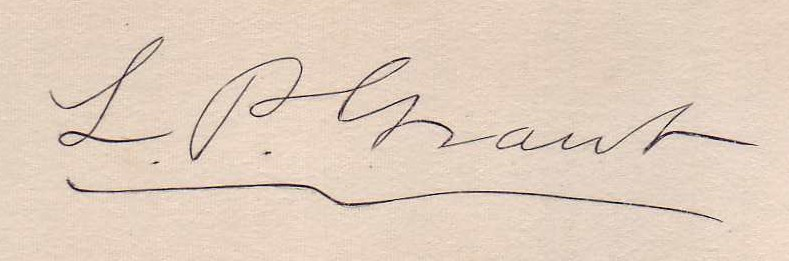
- Signature

Lemuel Pratt Grant (1817–1893) was an American engineer and businessman. He was Atlanta's quintessential railroad man as well as a major landowner and civic leader. In railroads he served as a laborer, chief engineer, speculator and executive all over the South. As part of his speculation, he owned enormous tracts of land in strategic areas. For example, at one point he owned more than 600 acres (240 ha) in what is now Atlanta. He designed and built Atlanta's defenses during the American Civil War and afterwards became an important civic leader: donating the land for Grant Park, Atlanta's first large park, and serving as councilman and on various boards and committees. His mansion is one of only four remaining original antebellum houses in the city of Atlanta.

== Early career ==
Lemuel Pratt Grant was born at Frankfort, Maine, on August 11, 1817. He grew up on a farm and between twelve and nineteen years of age worked on the farm and in a village store. When nineteen years old, he became a rodman in the Engineer Corps of the Philadelphia and Reading Railroad, then under construction. By study and hard work, he made his way and in one year became assistant engineer.

In 1840, he was given the position of assistant engineer of the Georgia Railroad, under John Edgar Thomson, the chief engineer. His part of engineers located the line between Madison and Atlanta in 1840. In 1841, he became assistant in the engineer corps of the Central Railroad, of which L.O. Reynolds was the chief engineer, but in 1843 returned to the Georgia Railroad and served it until the grading was completed to Marthasville.

By 1844 he was buying large tracts of Atlanta real estate, mainly in the Third Ward. Two of LP's grandsons Laurel and Bryan, Sr. were successful real estate brokers and developers.

In 1845, L.P. Grant became the chief engineer and superintendent of the Montgomery and West Point Railroad and remained with that road until 1848, when its track was laid as far as Opelika, Alabama. He then again returned to the services of the Georgia Railroad, this time as resident engineer, which position he held until 1853. for two years of that period he was also chief engineer of the Atlanta and West Point Railroad.

From 1853 to 1858, he was engaged in railroad construction contracts in Louisiana, Mississippi, and Texas. In 1858, he was elected president of the Southern Pacific Company of Texas, and was succeeded by J. Edgar Thompson in 1859.

In 1859 and 1860, he was engaged as engineer of surveys and location of proposed roads in Alabama and Georgia but those were suspended on the approach of the [Civil] war.

In 1862, [C.S.A] Colonel Grant was appointed a captain of engineers for the Confederacy and retained that position to the end of the [Civil] War. His most important work was the construction of the defensive works around Atlanta and Augusta.

From October, 1866 to 1881, Colonel Grant was in charge of the Atlanta and West Point Railroad as General Superintendent. For a time, he was President of the Georgia Western Road, later the Georgia Pacific, and now the Southern Railway's line [source written in 1934] from Atlanta to Birmingham.

In 1875, he was appointed receiver for the Georgia part of the Atlanta and Charlotte Air Line with about 100 miles of track. In 1881, he became President of the Atlanta and West Point Railroad and two years later, President of the Western Railroad of Atlanta. Both positions he held until 1887.

In 1844 and 1846, when Atlanta was known as Marthasville, Colonel Grant bought land lots 52, 53, and 44, containing about six hundred acres. For one of those lots he is said to have paid a dollar and a half per acre. That land was later worth an immense sum.

In 1883, Colonel Grant gave the City [of Atlanta] a later purchase containing [over] 100 acres of beautiful land for park purposes. It is known as Grant Park, and the City [of Atlanta] has added to his original gift by the purchase of some adjoining land.

Colonel Grant was an early advocate of the Public School System and a member of the first Board of Education elected in 1869. He was also a charter member of the Young Men's Library and its first life member.

From 1860, Colonel Grant was a member of Central Presbyterian Church and took an active part in its work.

He was married in December 1843, to Miss Laura Loomis Williams, a daughter of Ammi Williams. She died in 1879, leaving four children. In 1881, he married Mrs. Jane L. Crew of Atlanta. John Armstrong Grant, a railroad manager of Texas and early founding member of Grady Hospital, was the son of the first marriage.

Colonel L.P. Grant is of no relation to either of the persons named John T. Grant or John W. Grant, nor their descendants. It is but a happy coincidence that Bryan M. Grant, Sr, and John W. Grant, were both successful Atlanta real estate developers and were also contemporaneous colleagues to one another. Of further note, there is no printed reference about L.P. Grant ever coming to prominence by working as a laborer on the Georgia Railroad, working for the Fannin Company, or working for any companies based in Augusta Ga. There are many erroneous statements in railroad related articles about these relationships. One can only imagine that there being several prominent Grants, and not of the same family, that some confusion has persisted down through the years.

The cited reference of Walter Cooper's Official History of Fulton County was written by an appointment by the Georgia Grant Jury "in Pursuance to Legislative Action" and published in 1934. The History Commission of that time was composed of Ivan Allen, chairman, Henry C. Peeples, Dr. Louie D. Newton, Miss Ella May Thornton, and Miss Alice Baxter.

In 1843, Grant invested in land in what is now southeast Atlanta, paying from $.75 to $2 an acre, and built his home in the center of his 600+ acres. In 1883, he donated 108 acres (44 ha) east and southeast of his mansion to the city for a park on condition that would be open and available free of charge to residents of any race, creed or color. His family then developed the surrounding neighborhoods, as evidenced by street signs named after family and friends of the family (Bryan Street, Grant Street, Loomis Street, Broyles Street, etc.). Lake Abana, where the zoo food court now exists below the panda exhibit, would have been witness to a crowd of bathers of any race, racial segregation not descending upon Atlanta until a decade or two later. During this idyllic period of relative stability of racial tension, Grant opened a trolley line between downtown and the park.

== Banker ==
On January 27, 1857, Grant founded the Atlanta Bank with John Mims, William Ezzard, Clark Howell, Sr., Jonathan Norcross, Richard Peters, Joseph Winship and N.L. Angier. They were warned of Chicagoan George Smith who was planning on flooding Midwest banks with Georgia currency so avoided that scandal but eventually went broke and their charter was revoked in 1856. Grant would try banking again in the 1870s.

== Heading west ==
In 1853, he and John T. Grant headed to New Orleans to work on the Cotton Belt Railroad (then the Jackson and Great Northern Railroad). In 1857, Fannin, Grant & Co [These possibly the Athens Ga Grants, JT and WD Grant, contractors. Neither are related to LP Grant.] as became contractors to the Southern Pacific Railroad to link Marshall, Texas, to the West Coast, and the next year Lemuel P. Grant was named president of Southern Pacific. Back in Atlanta in 1860, he and Richard Peters pushed a Georgia Western Railroad against Jonathan Norcross's Air Line.

From 1853 to 1858, he was engaged in railroad construction contracts in Louisiana, Mississippi, and Texas. In 1858, he was elected president of the Southern Pacific Company of Texas, and was succeeded by J. Edgar Thompson in 1859.

== Civil War ==
Before the American Civil War, Grant gave land on Jenkins Street for Atlanta's first black church, Bethel Church (now Big Bethel Baptist Church), and defended the church's right to the property after the war.

The beginning of the war saw Grant still in Louisiana. In February 1861, Fannin, Grant & Co sold out to the Southern Pacific, and Grant returned to Atlanta. After the Vicksburg Campaign, Confederate Chief of the Engineer Bureau Jeremy Gilmer contacted him to survey possible enemy crossings of the Chattahoochee River, and defensive works were begun in August, 1863. Grant explained that the fortification of Atlanta would be as difficult as that of Richmond, Virginia. Grant planned a series of 17 redoubts forming a 10-mile (16 km) circle over 1 mile (1.6 km) out from the center of town. It was bounded on the north on high ground (present location of the Fox Theatre), on the west by Ashby Street, on the south by McDonough Drive and on the east by Grant Park. Gilmer inspected the completed work in December 1863. Because of how the Battle of Atlanta unfolded, these fortifications were never really put to the test, the city's Mayor Calhoun capitulating to the siege after the railways to Macon were seized by Union forces and Confederate General John Bell Hood was forced to destroy his ammunition train after the Union victory at Jonesborough.

== After the war ==
The most important shopping area in town was Broad Street and Market Street which were separated by the railroads. A wooden bridge had been built to span the distance; when it burned, Grant designed and built a new one which was completed in July 1865. He was superintendent of the Western & Atlantic and Atlanta & West Point Railroads. In June 1867, he was on the first committee to name streets in Atlanta with Winship and former mayor William Ezzard. In 1870, he was part of the committee to lure Oglethorpe University to Atlanta from Midway. In 1873, he organized the Bank of the State of Georgia. Throughout the 1870s he represented the Third Ward in council and served on the Atlanta Board of Education and in the 1880s he served as water commissioner [Correction: His son John A, served as water commissioner ]. In 1882 he donated roughly 100 acres (0.40 km^{2}) in Land Lot 43 for Grant Park (currently home of ZooAtlanta and formerly the Cyclorama), which was later named in his honor, and the deed was issued May 17, 1883.

In 1884, he chartered Westview Cemetery with former mayor James W. English where he was buried after his death in 1893, a highly respected founding father of Atlanta.

== Family ==
Grant married Laura Loomis Williams, daughter of prominent DeKalb County businessman Ammi Williams, in 1843. They had four children: John Armstrong Grant, Myra B. Grant, Lemuel Pratt Grant, Jr., and Letitia "Lettie" H. Grant.

He is survived by several descendants who currently reside in the Atlanta area and elsewhere. Of note, Bryan M. "Bitsy" Grant, Jr. is his great-grandson, and achieved many remarkable feats as a world-renowned tennis athlete, honored in several Halls of Fame, including the International Tennis Hall of Fame. The City of Atlanta recognized him during the 1950s by naming a premier tennis center in his honor on Northside Parkway, Bitsy Grant Tennis Center.

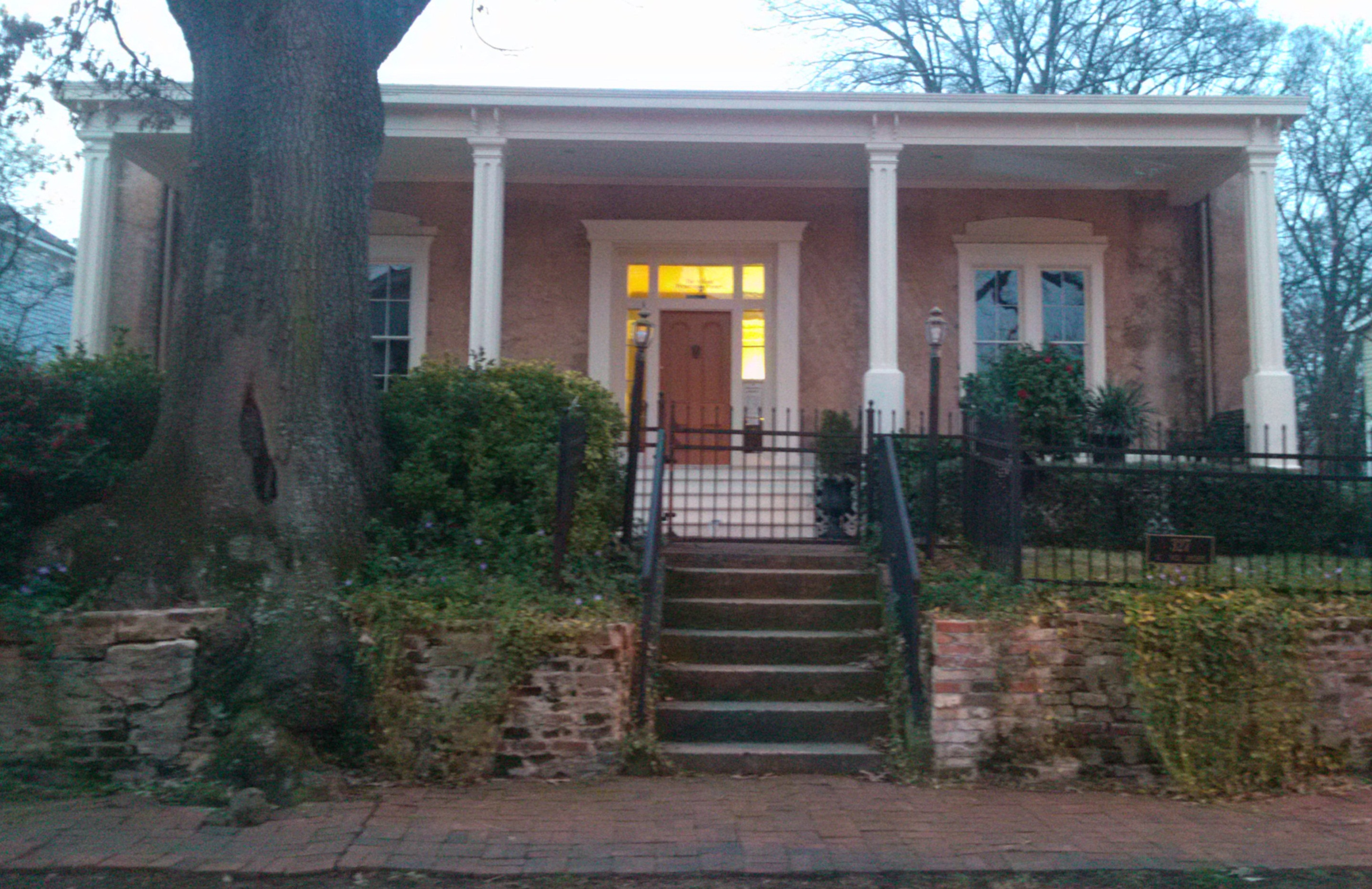
Grant Mansion, 2012

== Grant Mansion in Grant Park ==
The 1856 Lemuel P. Grant Mansion is one of only three antebellum houses within the current city limits of Atlanta that are still standing in their original locations, and is by far the closest to the city limits in the 1860s. The mansion was owned by Lemuel P. Grant, Atlanta's quintessential railroad man as well as a major landowner and civic leaderafter. Grant donated the land for Grant Park, which was named for him.

The three-story mansion was built in Italianate style in 1856. Union troops burning Atlanta in 1864 spared it because Masonic paraphernalia was found there, and the troops had been instructed not to harm the homes of Masons. In December 2001, the Atlanta Preservation Center purchased the house for $109,000; restoration of, and improvements to the house and grounds are ongoing.

Bobby Jones, the legendary golfer, was born in this home while the Jones family was in town visiting from Canton, GA.

L.P. Grant's great-grandson, Bryan M. "Bitsy" Grant, the famed tennis player named to the International Tennis Hall of Fame, grew up in this home until the family moved to Ansley Park along 17th Street. Bobby Jones, grandson, Bobby Jones IV is an Anglican priest in Athens Ga.
