= Perkerson, Atlanta =

Coordinates: 33.69°N 84.41°W

The Perkerson neighborhood (formerly called Perkerson Park) is located in Southwest Atlanta, Georgia, United States, in NPU-X (Neighborhood Planning Unit). The name was changed at the request of residents and members of the Perkerson Civic Association (PCA) in order to keep people from confusing the neighborhood with Perkerson Park, the large 49-acre park that serves the area.

== Boundaries ==
The neighborhood is surrounded by the Downtown Connector and I-75 to the east, SR 166 to the north, the Atlanta-East Point city limits to the west, and Cleveland Avenue to the south.

== History ==
The area that now encompasses the Perkerson neighborhood was originally owned by Jeremiah S. Gilbert (a farmer), who purchased the land from his father, the first doctor in Fulton County. Gilbert was married to Mathilda Perkerson, the daughter of Thomas Jefferson Perkerson, who was the second sheriff of Fulton County, who originated from another pioneer family of Fulton County. The Perkerson neighborhood developed on the land of Thomas J. Perkerson and Jeremiah S. Gilbert. They purchased 500 acres (2.0 km^{2}) from his father's holdings. The land was not developed fully until the 1950s.

Thomas J. Perkerson settled in land lots 103 and 104 (Perkerson Park and Sylvan Hills) with his family in the mid-1830s. His home stood for over a hundred years on Perkerson Road (Old Rough and Ready Road) before its demolition for construction of a grocery store.

Thomas Perkerson was the second sheriff of Fulton County. His land was subdivided into Perkerson Park and Sylvan Hills in 1944 after the death of Lizzie Perkerson Butler, who was the last family member to live in their house, which had survived General Sherman's burning of Atlanta. The family refused to leave the house as Matilda Perkerson Gilbert was too sick to be moved.

Plunkett Town was located at the southern edge of what is now Perkerson, around the current location of the I-75 Cleveland Avenue interchange.

== Neighboring communities in NPU-X ==
Capitol View and Sylvan Hills are to the north, but they are at least a mile apart. Hammond Park is located on the south side of Cleveland Avenue and extends down to the Hapeville city limits.

== Places of interest ==
- Jeremiah S. Gilbert House at Avery Park and the Jeremiah S. Gilbert State Memorial Site
- Roseland Cemetery

== Education ==
Perkerson residents are zoned to schools in the Atlanta Public Schools.

=== Elementary schools ===
- Emma Hutchinson Elementary School

=== Middle schools ===
- Crawford W. Long Middle School

=== High schools ===
- South Atlanta High School
