= Plunkett Town =

Coordinates: 33.6498°N 84.3949°W

Plunkett Town was a neighborhood in the southern part of the city of Atlanta, Georgia. It was located south of Hapeville, Georgia city limits, adjacent to the Atlanta airport and across the railroad tracks from industrial plants. Also referred to as "Plunkytown," it housed low-income black Atlantans and was described as a slum. Its close proximity to Atlanta's airport at a time of dramatic expansion meant that this residential community was virtually wiped off the map by the late '70s.

The community was described in 1969 as "1,800 black persons living in primitive rural conditions," "incredibly dilapidated frame hovels," with no sewers, paved streets, mail service, school buses, or running water, "alongside a modest but well-maintained white residential area". Mayor Ray King of Mountain View, Georgia, the neighboring white community, earned political favor with Plunkett Town residents for extending city services like garbage collection, police and fire protection to this previously underserved area. As was the case in Mountain View, by the early 1980s, the dense residential grid of Plunkett Town had been replaced by warehouses and industrial facilities related to air logistics. Today, the Atlanta Tradeport complex covers most of the former site of Plunkett Town.

The Gilbert Cemetery, set aside for slaves in 1841, eventually became the final resting place for many residents of Plunkett Town. Up to 1700 people were buried there. The Old South Motel and Dining Room (or Old South Motel and Liquor Store) later occupied the property and the owners allegedly removed many of the headstones. During the construction of the I-75 interchange at Cleveland Avenue, GDOT discovered the damaged burial ground and attempted to make amends by erecting a 7-foot statue of Jesus Christ (depicted as a white man). This led to a federal lawsuit for violation of separation of church and state, as well as public outcry over the insensitivity of placing a "white Jesus" over a black cemetery. The compromise solution was a roadside memorial featuring a marble obelisk and a number of uniform, concrete headstones marking the approximate site of the cemetery.
