= Cascade Mansion =

Coordinates: 33.732816°N 84.545664°W

General information
- Location: Atlanta, Georgia
- Address: 1530 Dodson Dr SW, Atlanta, GA 30311

Technical details
- Floor count: 3.5 floors

The Cascade Mansion is the name of an antebellum home built in south west Atlanta, Georgia, south of the Sandtown (Now Cascade Road), and was

built by Dr. William Poole and Elizabeth Gilbert Poole, son in law of the first physician, Dr. William Gilbert, in Fulton County, Georgia.

The construction began in 1860, and was incorrectly identified by soldiers of the US XXIII Army Corps during the siege of Atlanta as the "Head House". The home served briefly as the Headquarters of Confederate Major General William B. Bate, attached to S.D Lee's Corps during the Battle of Utoy Creek, August 1–7, 1864. The home and grounds served as a US Army Hospital during the Siege of Atlanta for the XXIII and later XIV Corps in August 1864. The home is of the antebellum style on the former East Point Road (now Dodson Drive SW) in Atlanta. The interior was finished in the Victorian style in 1869–70.

The property was purchased by Ms. Dixie Stevens proponent of Arts in Atlanta and the "Save the Fox Theater" and historical preservation in Atlanta.
