= Judge William Wilson House =

Historic house in Georgia, United States

Coordinates: 33°44′15″N 84°30′38″W

- Formerly listed on the U.S. National Register of Historic Places
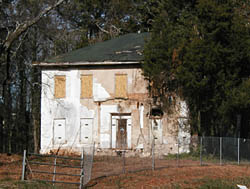
- Judge William Wilson House

- Location within Metro Atlanta Location within Georgia Location within the United States
- Location: 621 Fairburn Rd., SW, Atlanta, Georgia
- Area: 15 acres (6.1 ha)
- Built: 1856
- Architectural style: Greek Revival
- NRHP reference No.: 80001078

Significant dates
- Added to NRHP: February 15, 1980
- Removed from NRHP: November 27, 2020

The Judge William Wilson House was an antebellum house in Atlanta, Georgia. It was built on land in a community west of Atlanta that was then called Adamsville which Wilson had inherited from his father William "Dollar Mill" Wilson (1775–1839) in 1839, and as the area around it developed came to be located in the Fairburn Heights neighborhood, a suburban area west of the Perimeter (I-285). At the end, it was one of only a few remaining antebellum structures still standing in its original location within the Atlanta city limits.

The house was built in the Greek Revival style between 1856–1859 and was the main house of a plantation that, at twelve hundred acres, was one of the largest in the area. The house was used during the Battle of Atlanta by Union General William Tecumseh Sherman as a temporary headquarters. After the war, William Asbury Wilson (1824–1903) served as a representative in the Georgia General Assembly, as a justice of the inferior court in Fulton County, and as the county's sheriff. The house remained in the Wilson family into the 1962 when the great grandson of the builder sold the property to the Holy Family Hospital who used it as housing for their nurses. Its final use was as a community center. By 2011 the house was disused, the roof was falling in and there were cracks in the stone walls. In that year it was added to the Atlanta Preservation Center's "Most Endangered Properties" list. The unannounced demolition of the house in December 2015 "came as a surprise" to the preservation community, who had hoped to stabilize the building until other plans could be made to save it.
