= Republic Block =

Former commercial construction in Atlanta, Georgia

Coordinates: 33.7536°N 84.3890°W

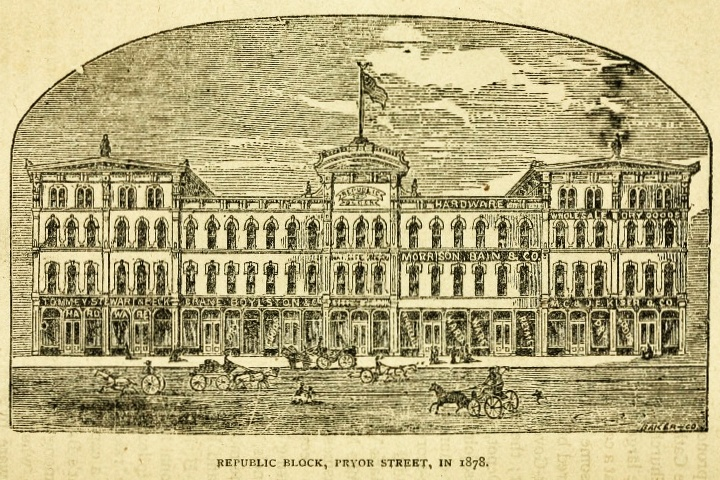
The Republic Block in 1878

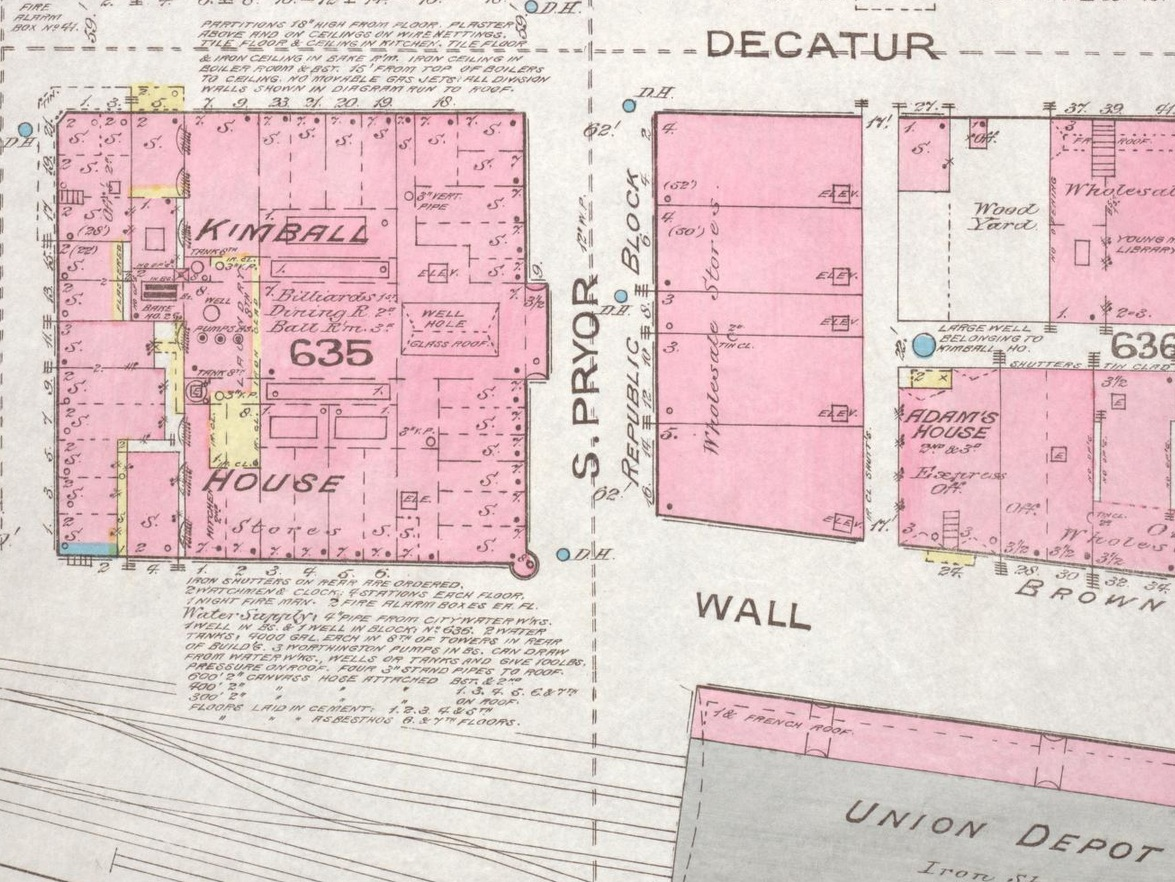
1886 Sanborn fire map showing the Republic Block and Kimball House

The Republic Block (completed in 1873) was at the time of its completion one of the most remarkable commercial constructions in Atlanta. It faced Pryor Street between Decatur St. and Railroad Ave. (now Wall St.), now site of Georgia State University buildings. It faced the Kimball House which stood across Pryor St. to the northwest. The block was built on the initiative of William Goodnow, a manager for the Republic Insurance Company of Chicago, with partners ex-governor Joseph E. Brown, Judge O. A. Lochrane, and others Its first tenants were hardware mostly wholesale and other dealers (hardware, diamonds, jewelry, millinery, dry goods, boots and shoes, clothing, tobacco and cigars), as well as an architect, attorney, a bank, the Atlanta Chamber of Commerce, as well as the Republic Insurance Company.

The "Republic block" was demolished in 1940 and replaced with a garage and automobile filling station.
