= Atlanta Preservation Center =

Historic preservation organization in Atlanta

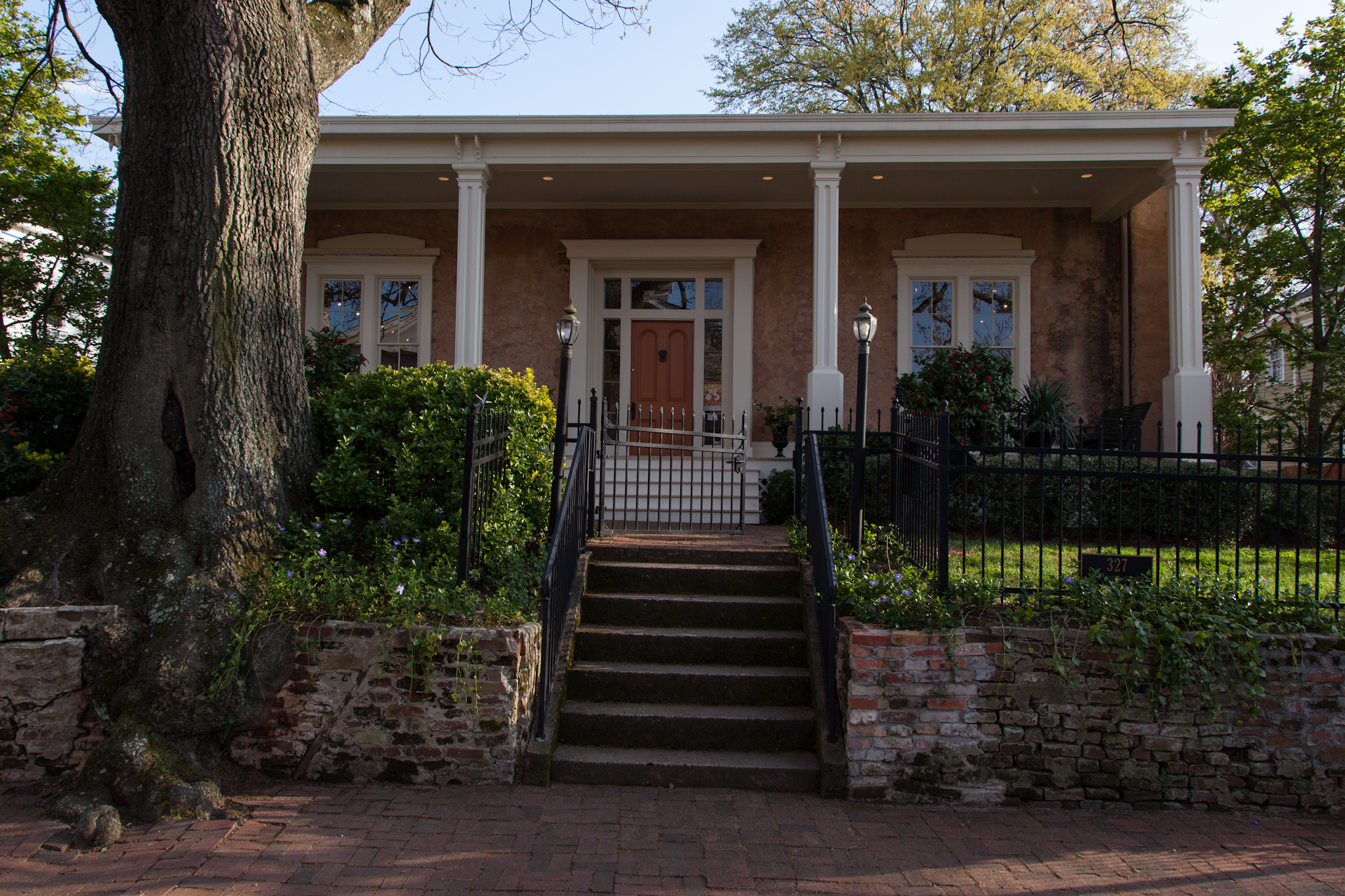
- Atlanta Preservation Center’s office
- Formation: 1979
- Headquarters: Lemuel P. Grant Mansion
- Executive Director: David Mitchell
- Website: https://www.atlantapreservationcenter.com/

Atlanta Preservation Center is a nonprofit organization in Atlanta, Georgia dedicated to preserving and celebrating historic buildings. The organization hosts tours, brings awareness to what it sees as Atlanta's most endangered sites, and works to help preserve buildings directly or by donating their time and expertise.

== Tours ==
The organization hosts behind-the-scenes tours of historic places in Atlanta, including as part of its annual celebration of living landmarks it calls "Phoenix Flies". As of 2015, the organization gave 10 different tours around Atlanta.

== Preservation ==
The organization also restores historic structures and helps organize the process for listing sites on historic registries. It organized the process for getting English Avenue Elementary School successfully listed on the National Register of Historic Places in 2020. The center was also one of the cofounders of Easements Atlanta, along with the Atlanta History Center, to help mitigate the costs of preserving historic facades of buildings. It purchased Lemuel P. Grant Mansion in 2001 and has spent over $1 million restoring while using it as the group's headquarters.

== Most Endangered Historic Places list ==
The Center started publishing a Most Endangered Historic Places list in 2001. The list has helped to preserve buildings including the Georgian Terrace, King Plow Arts Center, the 1924 Rich's building.

== See also ==
- Georgia Trust for Historic Preservation
