= Savannah Victorian Historic District =

Historic district in Georgia, United States

- U.S. National Register of Historic Places
- U.S. Historic district
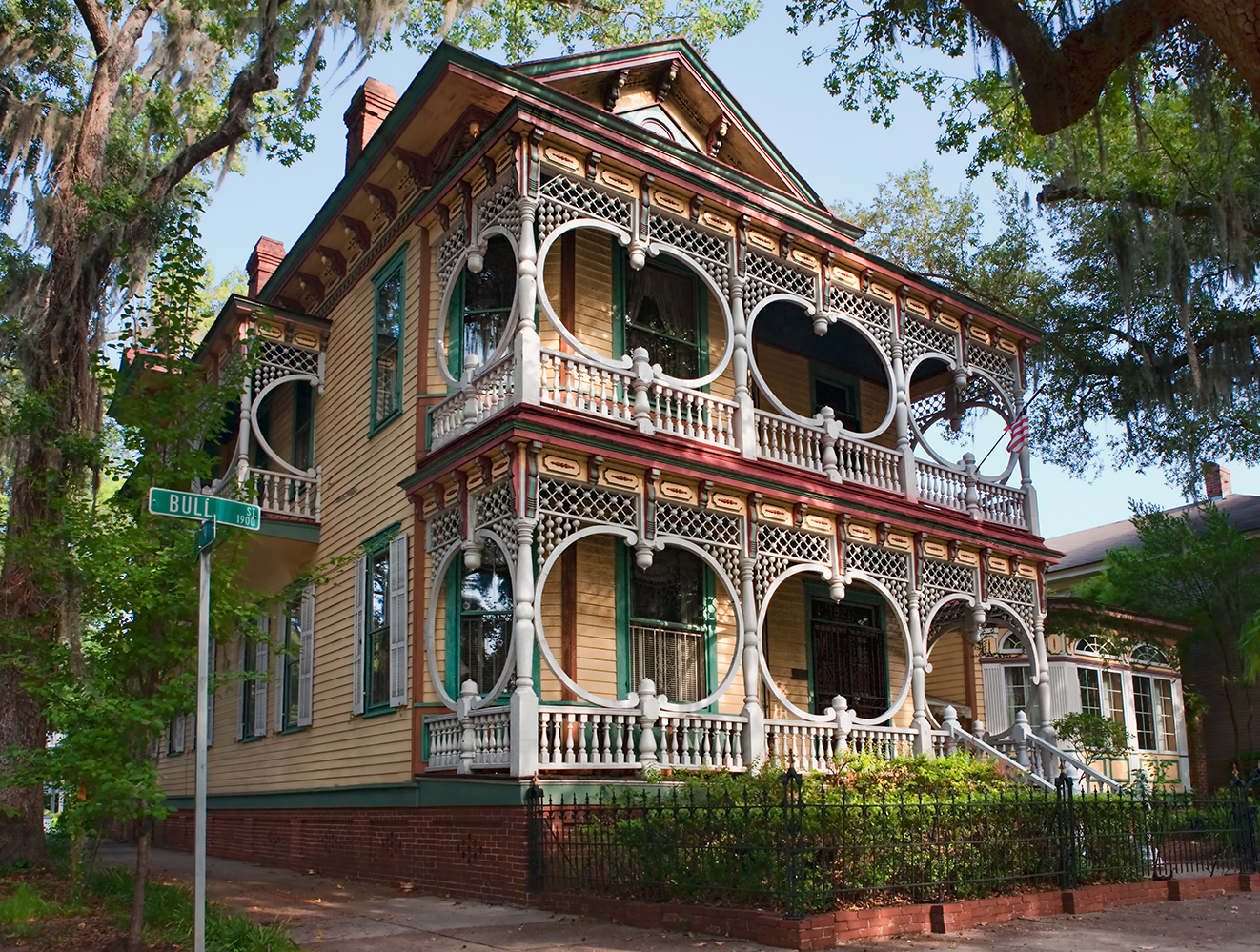
- The Gingerbread House, 1921 Bull Street

- Location within Georgia Location within the United States
- Location: Savannah, Georgia
- Coordinates: 32°3′53″N 81°5′49″W
- Built: 1875 (151 years ago)
- Architect: A.S. Eichburg, William Gibbons Preston (original)
- Architectural style: Late Victorian, Queen Anne (original); Late 19th And 20th Century Revivals, Late Victorian (increase)
- NRHP reference No.: 74000665 (original); 82002392 (increase)

Significant dates
- Added to NRHP: December 11, 1974; 51 years ago
- Boundary increase: May 20, 1982 (44 years ago)

The Savannah Victorian Historic District is a historic district in Savannah, Georgia. It is mostly residential in character and features Late Victorian, Queen Anne, and other architectural styles.

The district, which is not part of the Savannah Historic District, was first listed in 1974 and officially extended in 1982. The total area is bounded to the north by the Savannah Historic District, to the west by a public housing project, to the south by a neighborhood of early- to mid-20th-century residences, and to the east by a mixed-use area of Seaboard Coast Line railroad tracks, industry, commerce, housing, and vacant lots.

The original area formed in 1974 covers 45 city blocks and is bordered by Gwinnett, Price, Anderson, and Montgomery Streets. The 1982 extension is bounded by Gwinnett, Abercorn, and 31st Streets, and includes the Carnegie Colored Library, a park, and more residential structures.

The district includes the Asbury United Methodist Church, a historic church building built in 1887 that in 2019 was listed on the Georgia Trust for Historic Preservation's list of Places in Peril.

== History ==
Prior to the Victorian District's development in the late 19th century, the southwestern portion of the area was occupied by Cantonment Oglethorpe, a United States Army artillery installation that operated from 1826 to 1835. The cantonment site was ceded to the City of Savannah in 1853. The cantonment site now comprises part of the southwest quadrant of Forsyth Park and Lloyd Ward in the adjacent Victorian District.

The district was developed primarily between 1870 and 1910 as Savannah's first streetcar suburb, following a modified grid pattern that departed from James Oglethorpe's original ward and square design used in the older sections of the city.

== Gallery ==
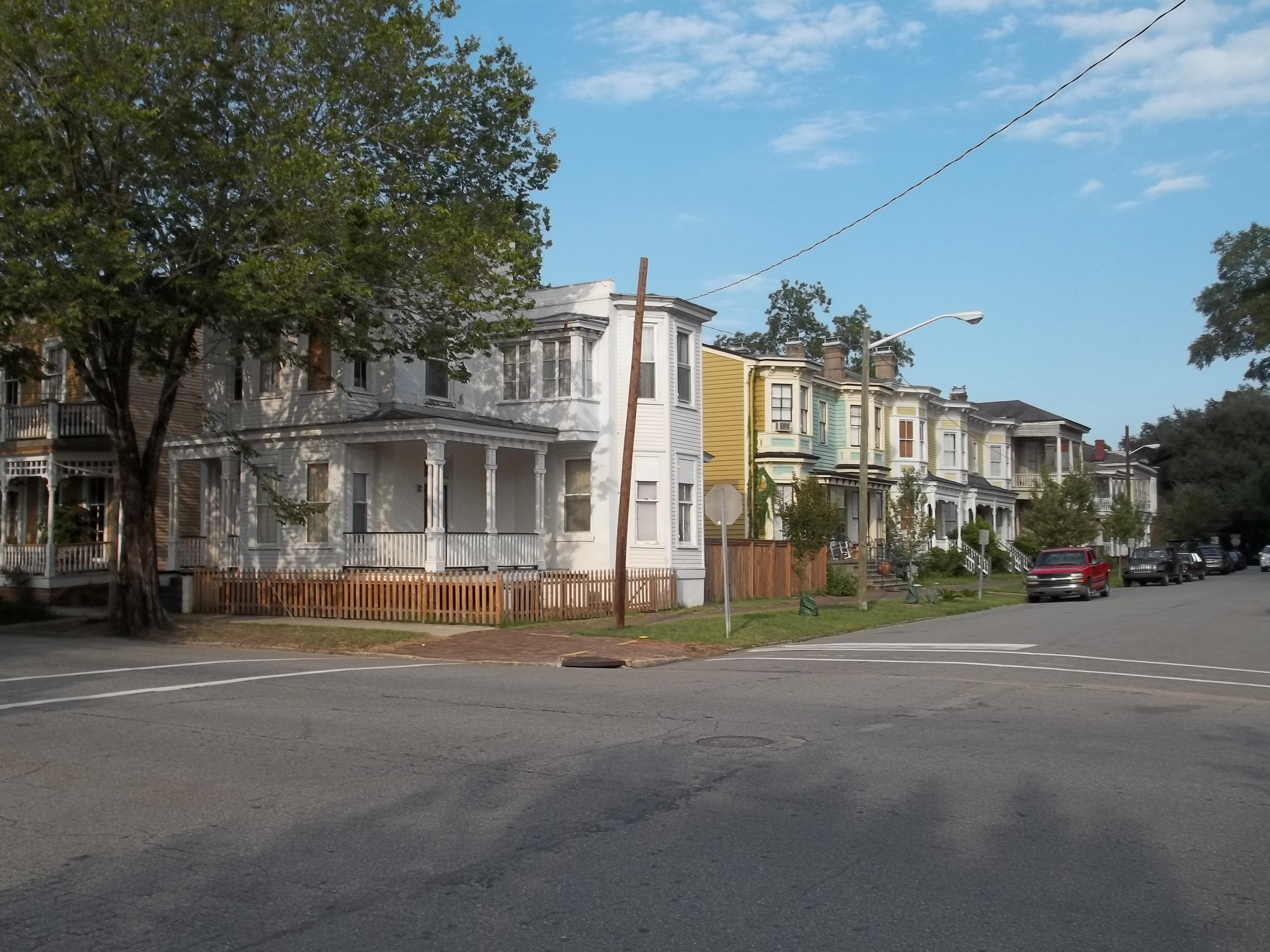
Street view

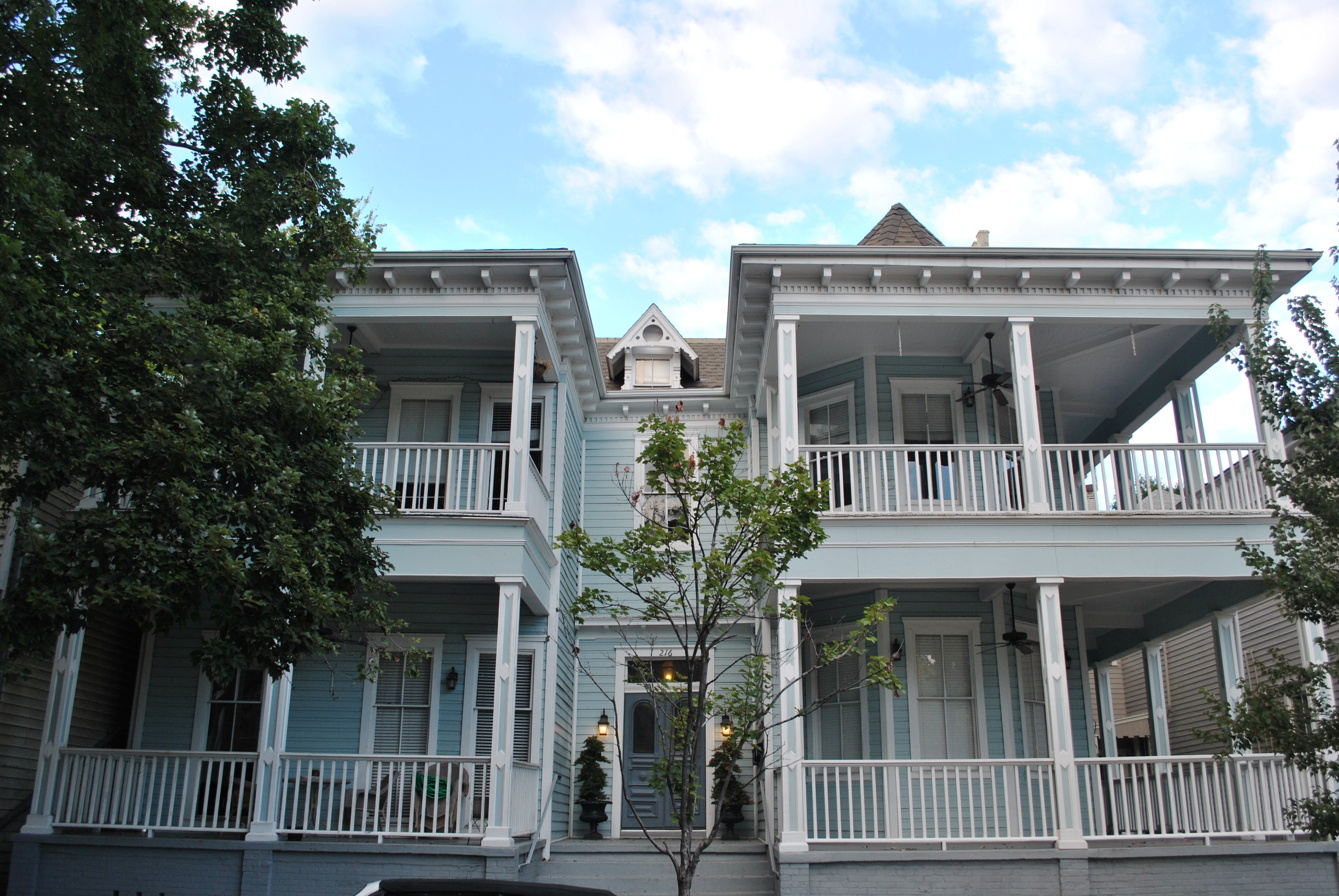
216-218 West Park Avenue

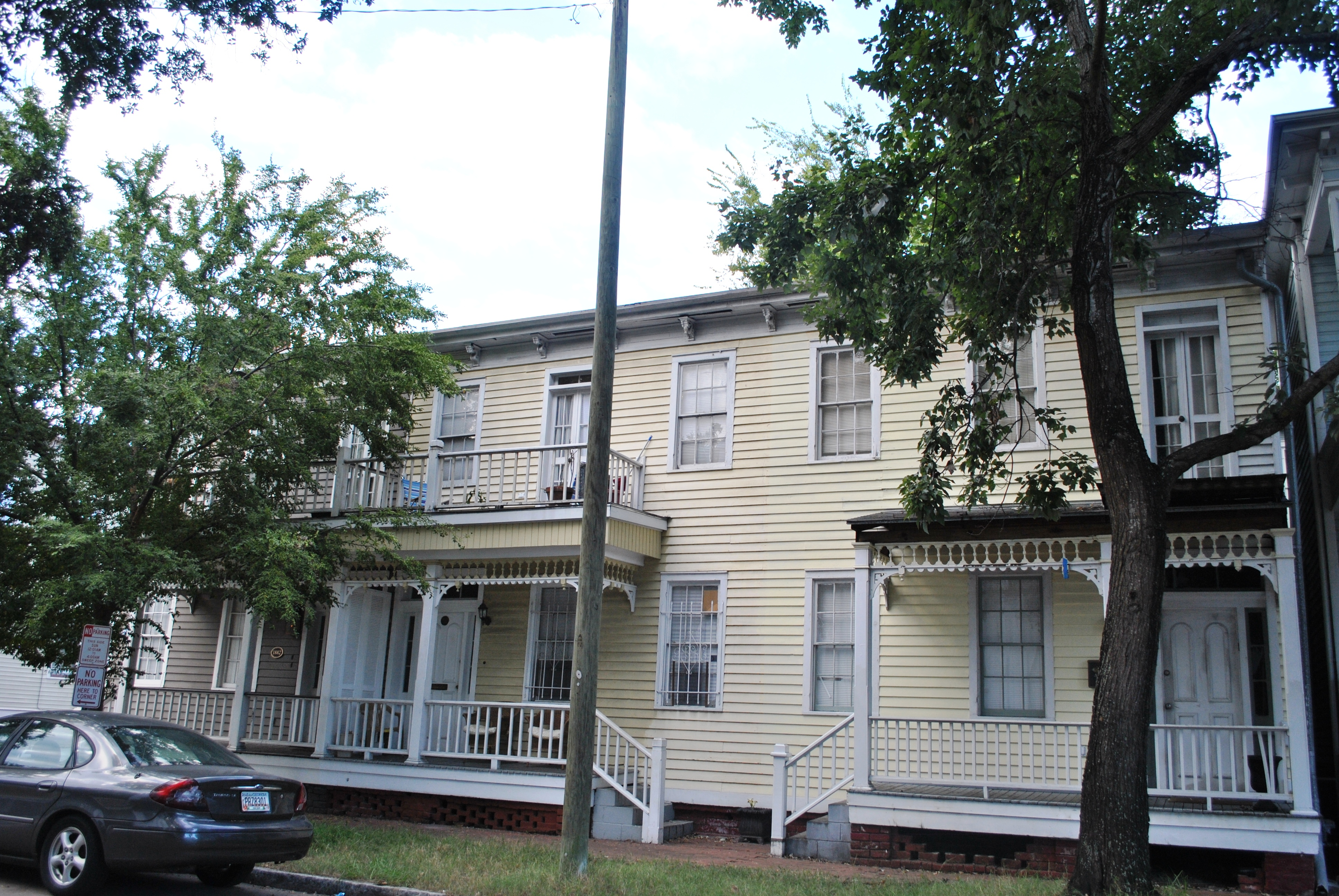
214 West Park Avenue

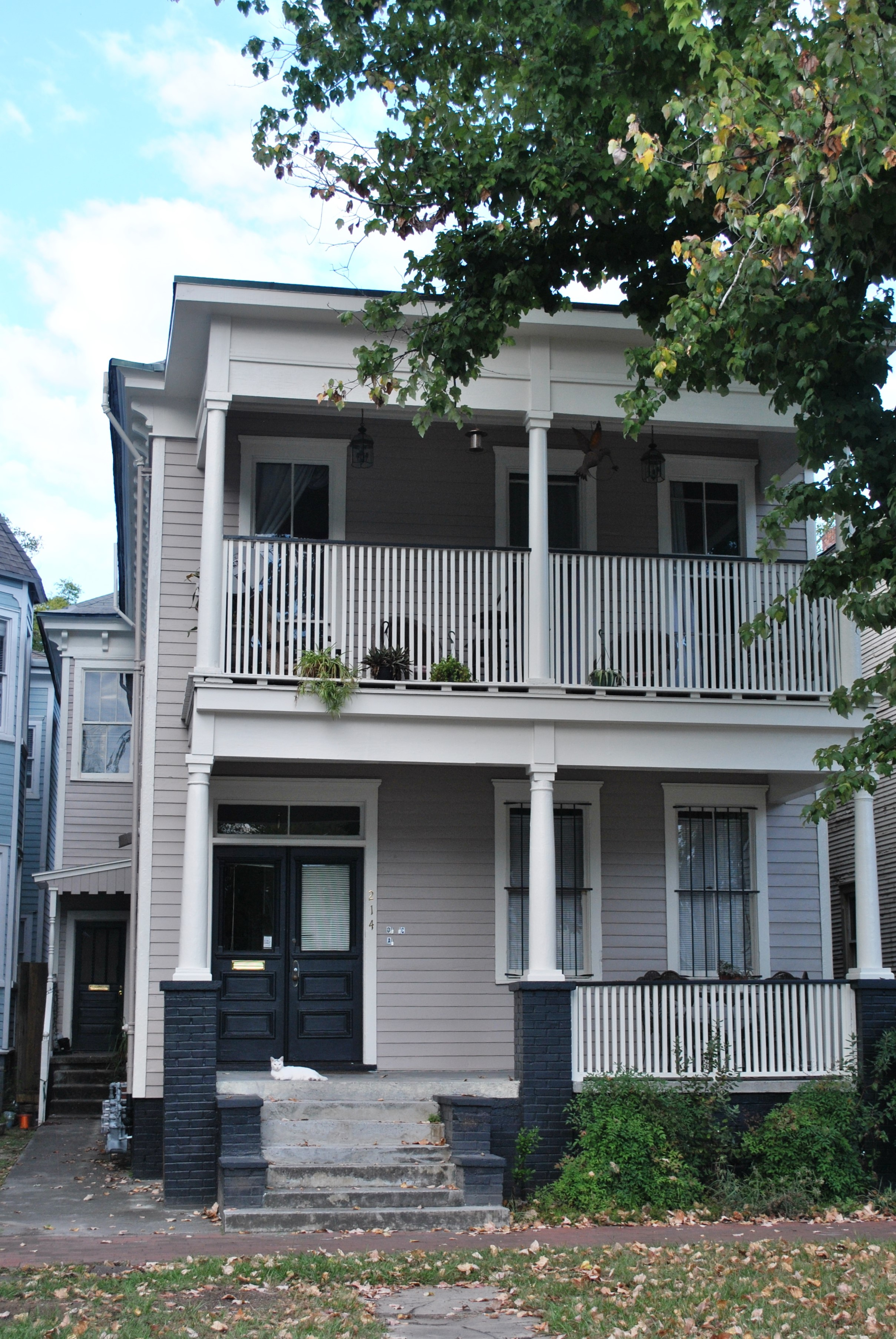
220 West Park Avenue

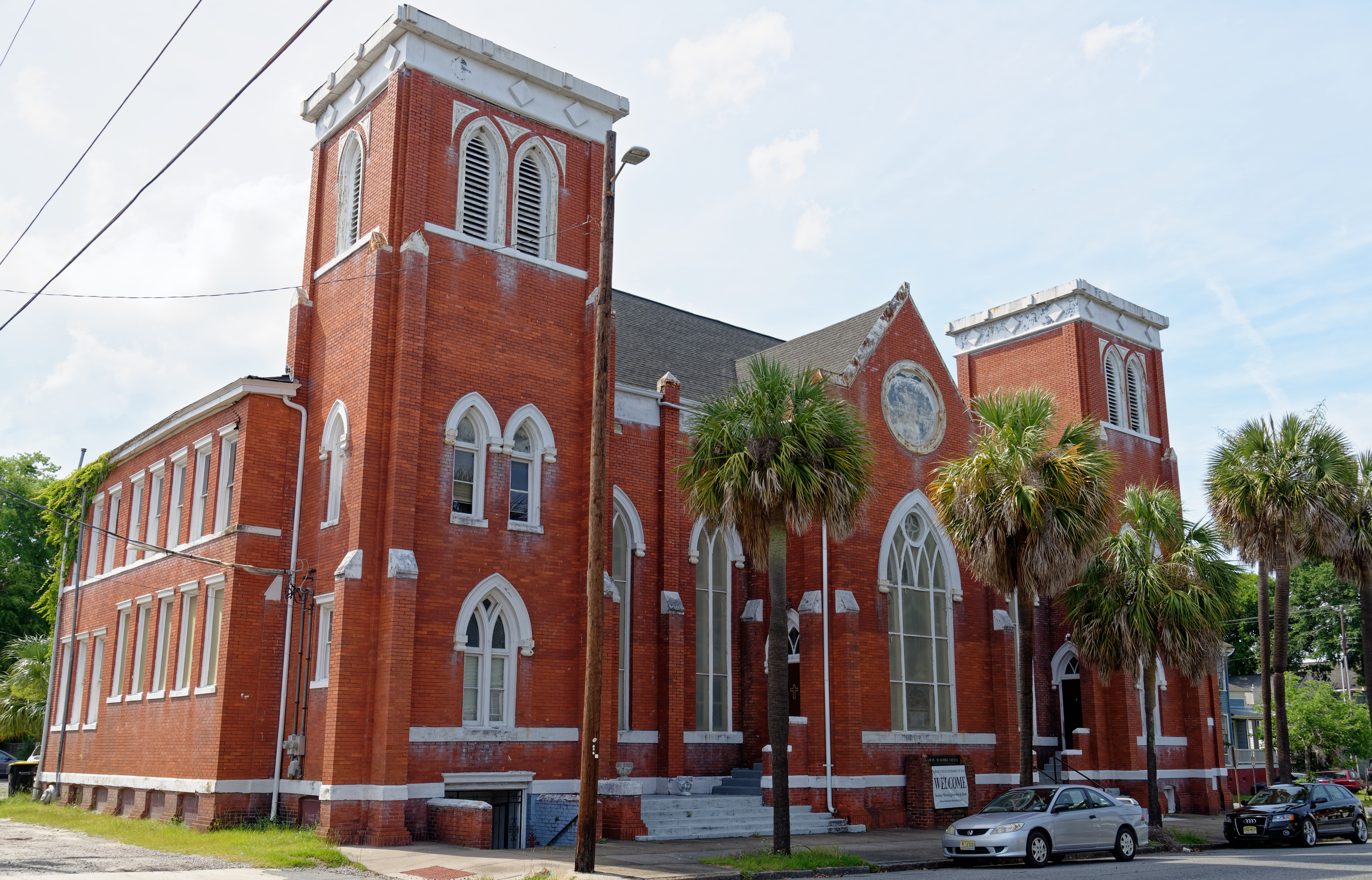
Asbury United Methodist Church, 1201 Abercorn
