= Atlanta Eagle =

Gay bar in Atlanta, Georgia

The Atlanta Eagle
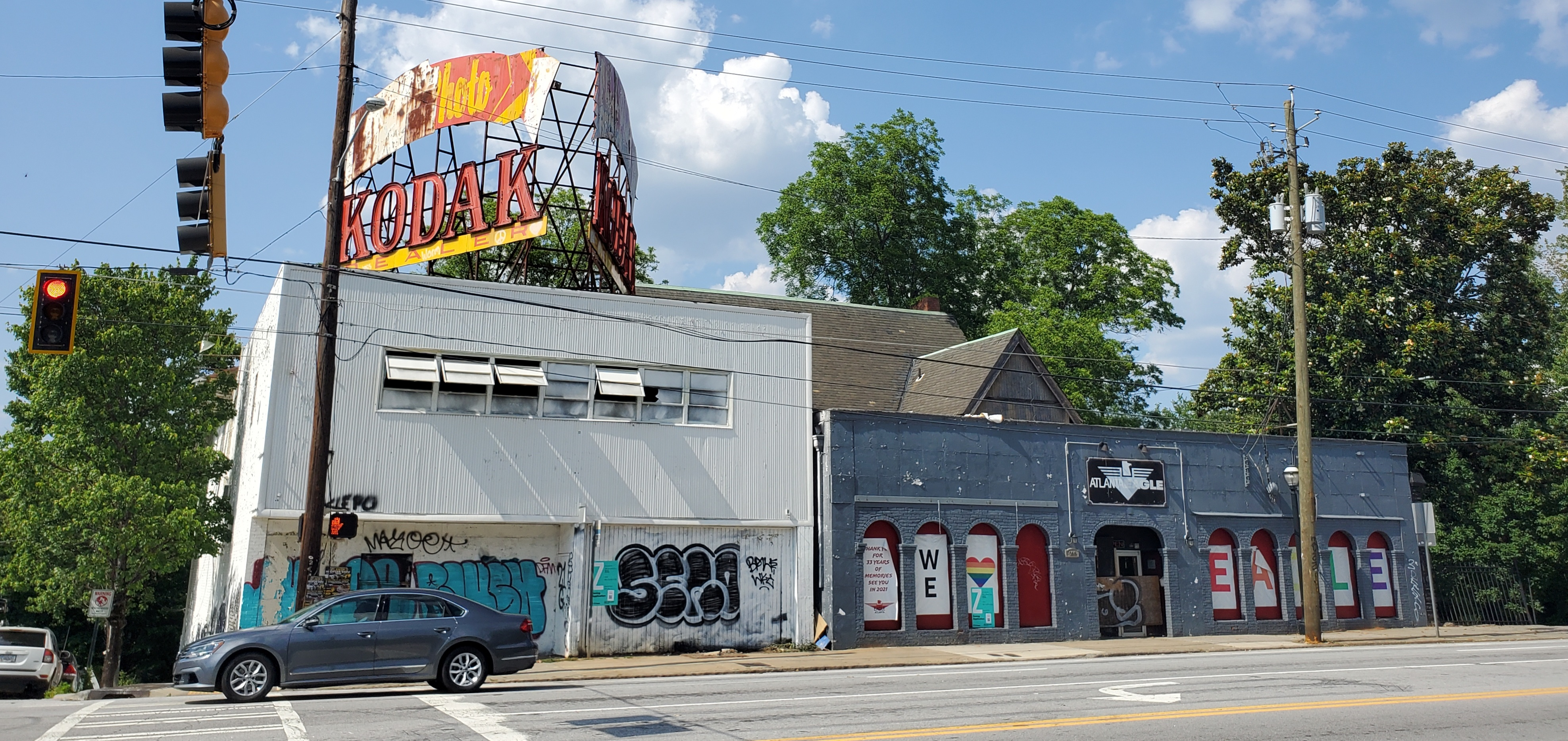
- Street view of Kodak building and the Atlanta Eagle
- Interactive map of The Atlanta Eagle
- Address: 1492 Piedmont Ave NE; Atlanta, Georgia; United States
- Coordinates: 33°47′46″N 84°22′16″W
- Owner: Richard Ramey
- Type: Gay bar, leather bar
- Current use: Nightclub and community hub

Construction
- Opened: 1985

Website
- atlantaeagle.com

The Atlanta Eagle is a gay bar that was established in Atlanta in the mid-1980s. (Note: Sources differ on the exact year. Several sources give anniversary dates, which would correspond to a founding year of 1987. A 2014 article in The Atlanta Journal-Constitution, however, stated that the bar had been occupying the same location since 1985.) According to a 2020 report by the Georgia Trust for Historic Preservation, the bar had become "a place of prominence in the LGBTQ community, significant as a site for public social interaction". It is part of the informal, global network of "Eagle" bars that cater to leather and kink communities.

== History ==
The building that originally housed the bar — located at 306 Ponce de Leon Ave NE, adjacent to the Kodak Building — is a contributing property to the Midtown Historic District. The bar was notable for catering to the leather subculture, and according to the website Them, it was the only leather bar for 1,200 miles (1,900 km) between Washington, D.C. and Wilton Manors, Florida. In 2020, the Georgia Trust placed the Eagle and Kodak buildings on its annual list of Places in Peril, stating that the buildings had fallen into disrepair and were at risk of demolition due to increased development in the area.

=== Closure of the Ponce de Leon location ===
On November 14, 2020, the Atlanta Eagle held its final night of service at 306 Ponce de Leon Ave NE, closing after more than 30 years at that address. Owner Richard Ramey attributed the closure primarily to the financial hardships caused by the COVID-19 pandemic, noting that the bar's dance floor had remained closed since March 2020 and that he had seen an 80 percent decline in sales. Ramey also noted that the building's landlord had informed him at the signing of his last lease that it would be the final one offered, as the landlord had other plans for the property.

=== Landmark designation of 306 Ponce de Leon ===
In December 2020, Atlanta Mayor Keisha Lance Bottoms announced that the City of Atlanta's Department of City Planning and the Urban Design Commission had begun the process of designating the Atlanta Eagle building at 306 Ponce de Leon Ave NE as a Landmark Building/Site. According to the preservation nonprofit Historic Atlanta, the designation would make the building the first recognized and protected LGBTQ landmark in the Deep South. The designation process was completed the following year: Atlanta's Zoning Review Board approved ordinances declaring the property a landmark, and the City of Atlanta subsequently completed the Landmark Building/Site designation for both the Atlanta Eagle building and the adjacent Kodak Building. With the designation, the property cannot be demolished or have its exterior altered without written approval from the Urban Design Commission.

=== Relocation to Piedmont Avenue ===
Despite the landmark designation protecting the building at 306 Ponce de Leon, the Atlanta Eagle did not reopen there. In September 2022, Ramey announced that the bar would move approximately two miles north to 1492 Piedmont Ave NE, taking over the space previously occupied by Midtown Moon in the Ansley Square shopping center. The bar reopened at the new location during Atlanta Pride weekend in October 2022, with Ramey reporting that approximately 8,000 patrons visited over the opening weekend.

=== 2024 fire at 306 Ponce de Leon ===
In June 2024, a fire broke out at the now-vacant landmark building at 306 Ponce de Leon Ave NE, heavily damaging the rear of the structure while the brick facade along Ponce de Leon remained standing. Atlanta Mayor Andre Dickens said at the scene that the fire did not appear to involve malicious intent. Ramey, who was present at the scene, expressed hope that the building could eventually be restored or repurposed for community use. The adjacent Kodak Building sustained a second fire in July 2024.

=== Chicago Eagle ===
In 2026, HV Entertainment — the Atlanta Eagle's owner — reopened the Chicago Eagle.

== See also ==
- Bear (gay culture)
- The Eagle (gay bars)
- LGBTQ culture
