= Glenridge Hall =

- Formerly listed on the U.S. National Register of Historic Places
- Location within Metro Atlanta Location within Georgia Location within the United States
- Location: 6615 Glenridge Drive; Sandy Springs, Georgia, United States
- Coordinates: 33°56′17.34″N 84°21′51.912″W
- Built: 1929
- Architect: Samuel Inman Cooper
- Architectural style: Tudor Revival
- NRHP reference No.: 82002418

Significant dates
- Added to NRHP: June 17, 1982
- Removed from NRHP: September 17, 2015

Glenridge Hall was a historic property in Sandy Springs, Georgia, United States. The house was built in 1929 and listed on the National Register of Historic Places in 1982. The site was demolished and delisted in 2015.

== History ==
Glenridge Hall was built by Atlanta businessman and co-founder of Georgia Power Thomas K. Glenn in 1929. Located on 400 acres (160 hectares) of farmland north of Atlanta in what is now Sandy Springs, the Tudor Revival house was designed by Atlanta architect Samuel Inman Cooper and required approximately a year for 60 men to build. The house would serve as Glenn's residence until his death in 1946. Starting in the early 1980s, Glenn's granddaughter began to restore the house, and it was listed on the National Register of Historic Places in 1982. In the following years, the building was used for many charitable events and fundraisers, and it was used as a filming location for such films and series as Driving Miss Daisy and The Vampire Diaries.

By Summer 2014, only about 80 acres (32 hectares) of the original property remained part of the estate. In July of that year, the property was put up for sale. Later that year, the Georgia Trust for Historic Preservation placed the property on its 2015 list of Places in Peril. In 2015, it was announced that the house would be demolished to make way for Mercedes-Benz's U.S. headquarters and for residential developments by Roswell, Georgia-based homebuilding company Ashton Woods. Following this announcement, historic preservationists in the area voiced their objection to the house's destruction, and they created a petition on Change.org arguing against its destruction. By April 2015, the petition had over 15,000 signatures. Despite this, the mansion was demolished on April 9.

== See also ==
- National Register of Historic Places listings in Fulton County, Georgia
