= Georgia Historical Commission =

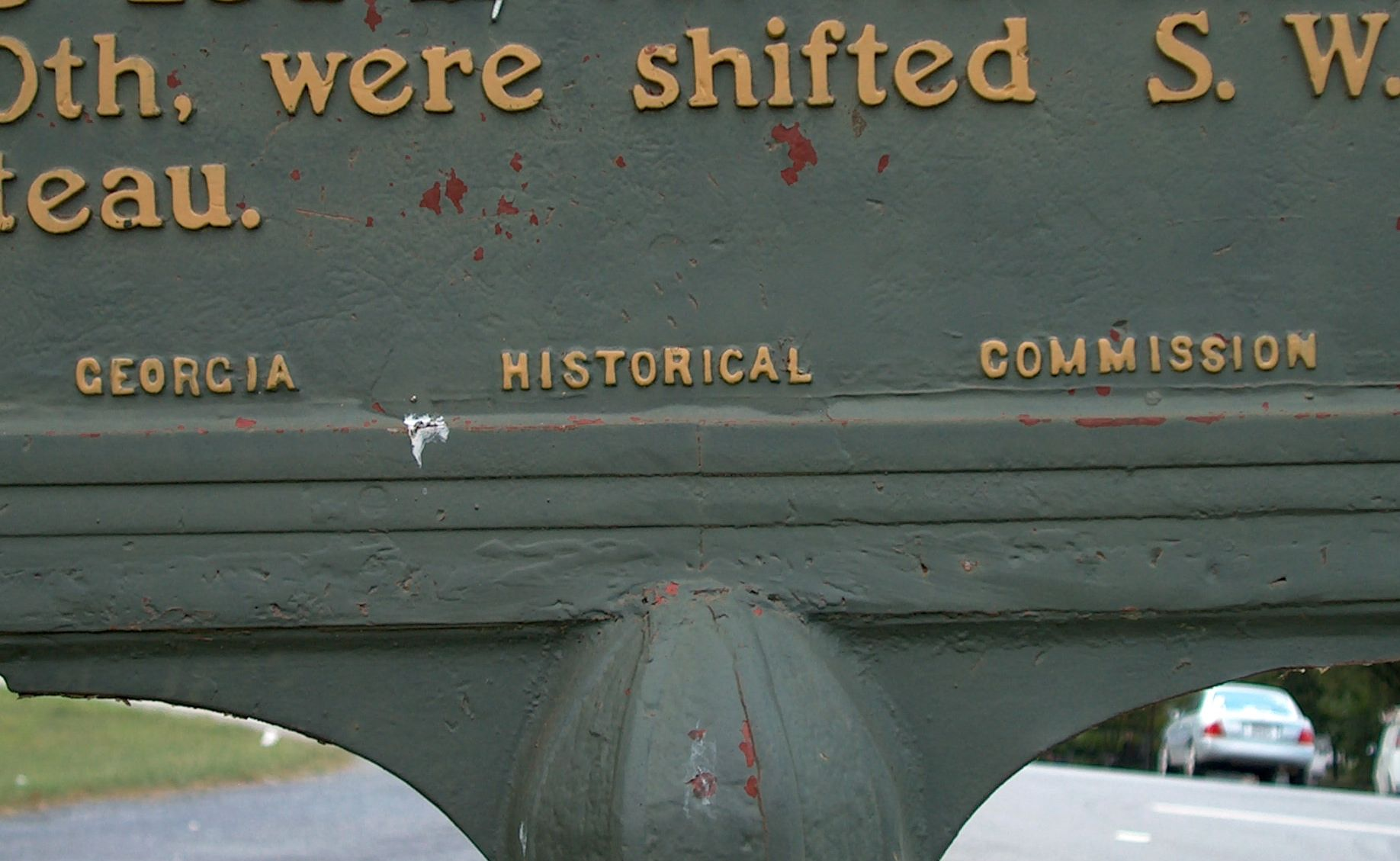
"Georgia Historical Commission" stamped on one of old Georgia historical markers.

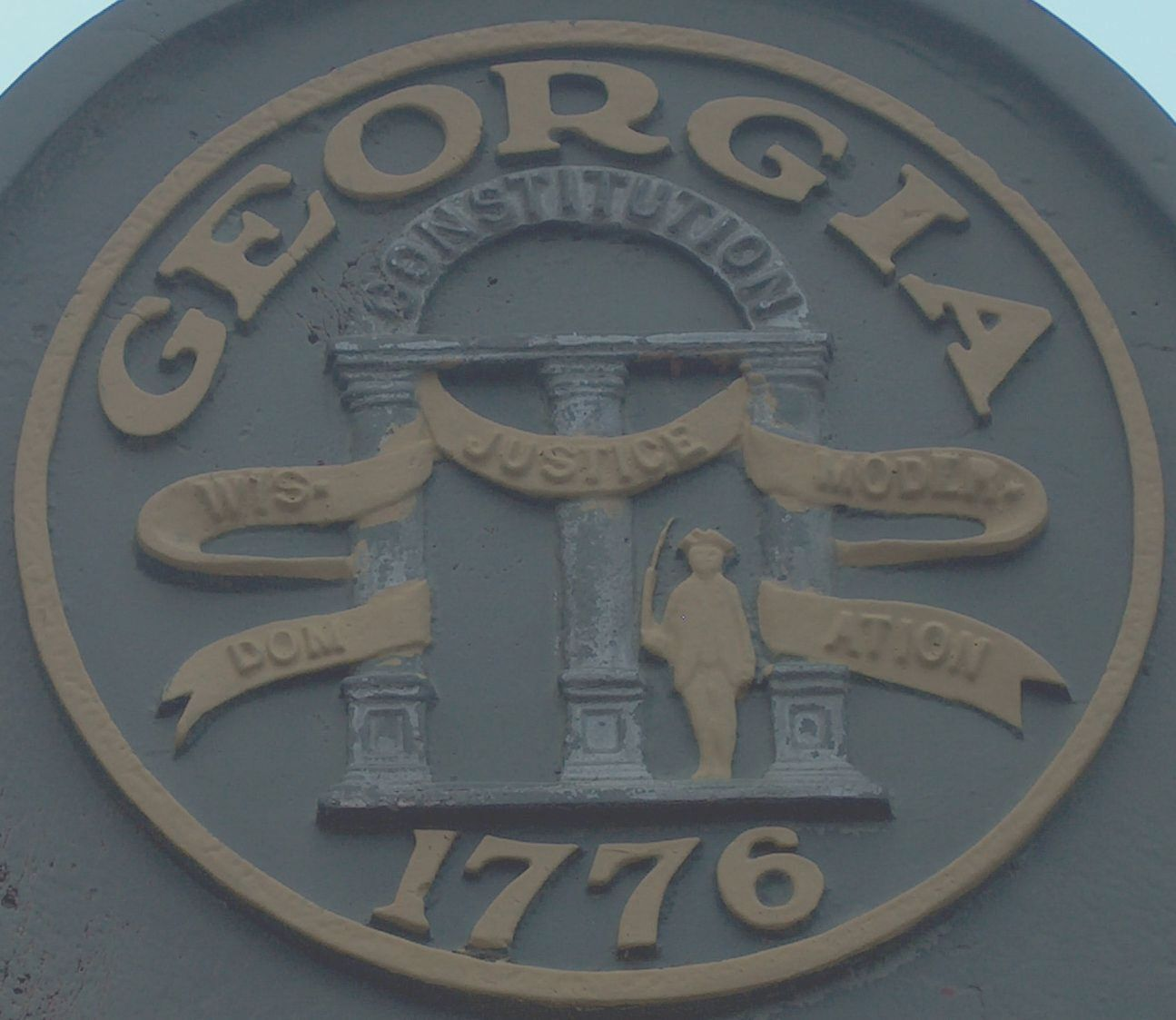
Seal of Georgia on an old historical marker, showing that the Georgia Historical Commission was under the State of Georgia until 1973.

The Georgia Historical Commission was an organization created by the U.S. state of Georgia for purposes of historic preservation. The Georgia legislature created it in February 1951 to promote and increase knowledge and understanding of the history of Georgia. Its work, including the erection of hundreds of historical markers, was accomplished during a relatively brief existence. These markers are still standing today. The impetus for the creation of the commission came from several sources as local historical societies were launching restoration projects of statewide importance.

These projects often needed not only financial and technical help but a way to coordinate plans with other state projects. Three Atlanta civic leaders lobbied for a state historical commission: Henry A. Alexander, an attorney who was appointed chairman of the first board of commissioners; Joseph Jacobs, a pharmacist; and Frank Boland, a physician who wanted a memorial for Crawford W. Long, a Georgian who was the first person to use ether as an anesthetic.

Secretary of State Ben Fortson thought the project should be placed within his department, which already handled Georgia archives. Governor Herman Talmadge, after years of stormy political battles, was eager to support an initiative with wide appeal.

The commission began its life inauspiciously: because the act that created it forbade state funding, it had no budget. In 1952, however, this roadblock was lifted, and the Commission emerged as a significant state agency. C. E. Gregory, a retired political editor of the Atlanta Journal, had been influential in the campaign to establish the commission and became its first executive secretary. He was succeeded in 1960 by his daughter, Mary Gregory Jewett, who had been the commission's staff historian. Eventually the commission had a staff of 15 and a nine-member board, headed for 15 years by Joseph B. Cumming. Such specialists as the architectural historian William R. Mitchell Jr. and the archaeologist Lewis H. Larson Jr., who was involved in a New Echota project, advised the board over the years.

The commission also gained national recognition as a pioneer in state historic preservation. The most impressive of its major achievements was the acquiring, restoring, excavating, and developing of 20 historic sites, 15 of them staffed and seven with museums, including New Echota and the Chief Vann House Historic Site. The commission's other major work was erecting some 1,800 historical markers. In 1962, the approaching American Civil War centennial inspired the commission to set 750 Civil War markers in place before the observance in 1965. After 1966 the commission served as the state's review board for the National Register of Historic Places.

In 1973, Governor Jimmy Carter's governmental reorganization dissolved the 22-year-old commission. The successful agency's dissolution has caused controversy and bitterness, but much of commission's work has remained as the Department of Natural Resources took over the commission's functions and maintains most of the sites and museums, and the Georgia Historical Society took over the marker program. The responsibility of maintaining several sites now belongs to local groups.
