= Mary Gregory Jewett =

American preservationist (1908–1976)

- Born: Mary Gregory; 1908; Owensboro, Kentucky, U.S.
- Died: January 16, 1976 (aged 67–68)
- Resting place: Decatur Cemetery
- Education: University of Georgia, 1930 (BA, journalism; cum laude); Agnes Scott College
- Spouse: Sidney B. Jewett

Mary Gregory Jewett (1908 – January 16, 1976) was an American preservationist, journalist, public official, and historian who ran the Georgia Historical Commission from 1960 through its dissolution in 1973, and served as the first president of the Georgia Trust for Historic Preservation. In 2013, she was posthumously named a Georgia Woman of Achievement.

== Biography ==
=== Early years and education ===
Jewett was born in 1908 to Cleburne E. Gregory, a political editor at the Atlanta Journal, and Sarah Adelaide Collis. She was one of three children, with brother Cleburne Earl Gregory Jr. and sister Adelaide Gregory Norton. She attended the University of Georgia where she was a member of Phi Kappa Phi, Chi Omega, and Theta Sigma Phi, and graduated cum laude in 1930 with a BA in journalism.

=== Career at Georgia Historical Commission ===
In 1955, Jewett started working as staff historian at the newly established Georgia Historical Commission (GHC), where her father C. E. Gregory, who had helped to establish the agency, was in change. She succeeded him in 1960 as executive secretary (later executive director).

Under Jewett's 13-year leadership, the GHC expanded to employ fifty people and was nationally recognized for its pioneering preservation work. It acquired and restored twenty sites across the state (staffing a total of 15 locations and developing seven museums), and installed 1,800 historical markers. The GHC's first museum conversion was the Crawford W. Long Medical Museum. A coworker recalled her as the "only one who knows how to get along with legislators, politicians, and preservationists."

The Chief Vann House Historic Site was the first site the agency purchased, in 1952. Its full renovations unfolded over years, and the GHC ordered a study of the site by UGA archaeologist Clemens de Baillou ("The Chief Vann House at Spring Place, Georgia", published in 1957 in Early Georgia) and a translation of Moravian missionary diaries in an effort to, in Jewett's words, "[explore] every known source of knowledge and [make] the house and grounds as clear a picture as possible of the life of the owners". However, the painstaking restoration of the house's ornate Federal–Georgian architecture also served to embody an attempt by the Cherokee to "copy the whites" — an assertion disputed by Earl Boyd Pierce, who argued that the Cherokee were forced to "center their attention on orthodox building construction calculated to excite both pleasure and respect".

When the National Historic Preservation Act of 1966 became law, Jewett was the state liaison officer responsible for nominating properties in Georgia for national recognition under the program. The first National Register of Historic Places, published in 1969, included thirteen properties from Georgia. She became a leader among her peer officers in other states, helping to formulate their objectives.

=== Other activities and retirement ===
Jewett also was a member of various boards and organizations throughout her career. She was the first Georgian to serve on the Council of the American Association of State and Local History, one of two representatives from Georgia at the Bicentennial Council of the Thirteen Original States, and was part of the Council of State Preservation Officers, the Board of Governors of the Georgia Agricultural Development Board, the Georgia Conservancy, the Richard B. Russell Foundation, the Georgia Agrirama, and the Georgia Civil War Centennial Commission.

After her retirement from the government, Jewett helped established the Georgia Trust for Historic Preservation in 1973, a nonprofit organization modeled after the National Trust. She was its first president and hand-picked the trust's initial 30-member board of trustees. In an interview shortly before her death, she said the organization "[has] great goals".

== Death and legacy ==
Jewett retired in 1974. A long-time chain smoker, Jewett died of cancer on January 16, 1976. She had one son, George Cleburne Jewett.

Today, the Georgia Trust annually bestows the Mary Gregory Jewett Award for "distinguished service in the field of preservation" in the state.
