= Asbury United Methodist Church (Savannah, Georgia) =

United Methodist church in Savannah, Georgia

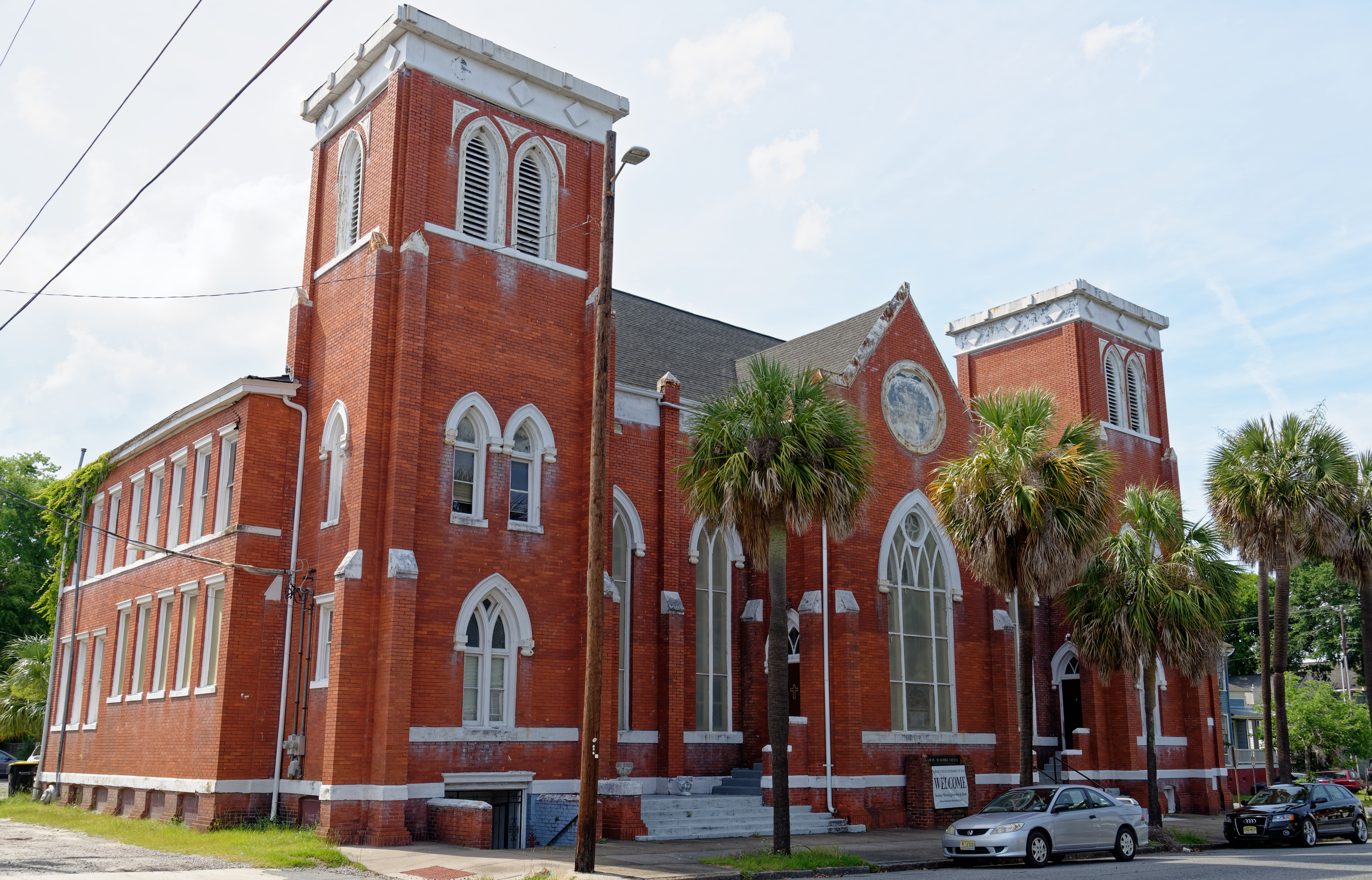
- Asbury United Methodist Church (2020)
- Asbury United Methodist Church
- 32°3′48″N 81°5′44″W
- Location: 1201 Abercorn Street; Savannah, Georgia 31401
- Denomination: United Methodist Church
- Website: www.asburyumcsavannah.com

History
- Founded: 1871
- Asbury United Methodist Church
- U.S. Historic district – Contributing property
- Part of: Savannah Victorian Historic District (ID74000665)
- Added to NRHP: December 11, 1974

Asbury United Methodist Church is a United Methodist church in the Savannah Victorian Historic District in Savannah, Georgia. The church was founded in 1871 and moved to its current location in 1927.

== History ==
The church traces its history to the Civil War, when several black Methodists began holding church service without formal affiliation with any established church in the city. In 1871, Reverend Charles O. Fisher of the Methodist Episcopal Church founded the church with 50 members. The church was named after Methodist bishop Francis Asbury. Early in its history, the church used several buildings, including one near Savannah Union Station. In 1927, the church moved to its current location, a church building purchased from Bull Street Baptist Church located on Abercorn Street in the Savannah Victorian Historic District. This building had been constructed in 1887 and partially rebuilt following damage from the 1896 Cedar Keys hurricane. The building incorporates elements of Gothic Revival architecture, including twin towers flanking the front of the building and arched windows. The church is the only African American United Methodist Church in the Victorian Historic District.

In 2019, the church building was placed on the Georgia Trust for Historic Preservation's list of Places in Peril. Water damage has left parts of the building unusable for the congregation. In the preceding years, the congregation had debated finding a new place of worship, but decided instead to raise funds necessary for repairs and improvements.

== See also ==
- National Register of Historic Places listings in Chatham County, Georgia

== Bibliography ==
- Aguilar, Amanda (November 14, 2019). "Asbury United Methodist Church on Ga. Trust's 'Places in Peril' list". WTOC-TV. Gray Television.
- "Historic black churches among Georgia's 'places in peril'". Associated Press. November 16, 2019.
- Elmore, Charles J. (2002). Savannah, Georgia. Black America Series. Arcadia Publishing. ISBN 978-1-4396-2911-6 – via Google Books.
- "Asbury United Methodist Church". Georgia Trust for Historic Preservation. November 13, 2019.
- Landers, Mary (November 13, 2019). "Savannah church named a 'place in peril'". Savannah Morning News. Gannett.
- "Asbury UMC (Savannah)". The South Georgia Conference of the United Methodist Church.
