= East Point Historic Civic Block =

- Interactive map of East Point Historic Civic Block
- 33.6796°N 84.4428°W
- Location: East Point, Georgia, United States

History
- Built: 1930–1939

Site notes
- Architectural styles: Colonial Revival, Antebellum, Federal Revival

The East Point Historic Civic Block consists of three historically significant buildings and one memorial park in downtown East Point, Georgia, and is located within the parameters of East Point Street, Linwood Avenue, Church Street, and West Cleveland Avenue. East Point's City Hall, City Auditorium, New Deal Library, and Victory Park make up the Civic Block, which since 2011 has been the focus of both redevelopment interest and historic preservation efforts.

== East Point City Hall ==
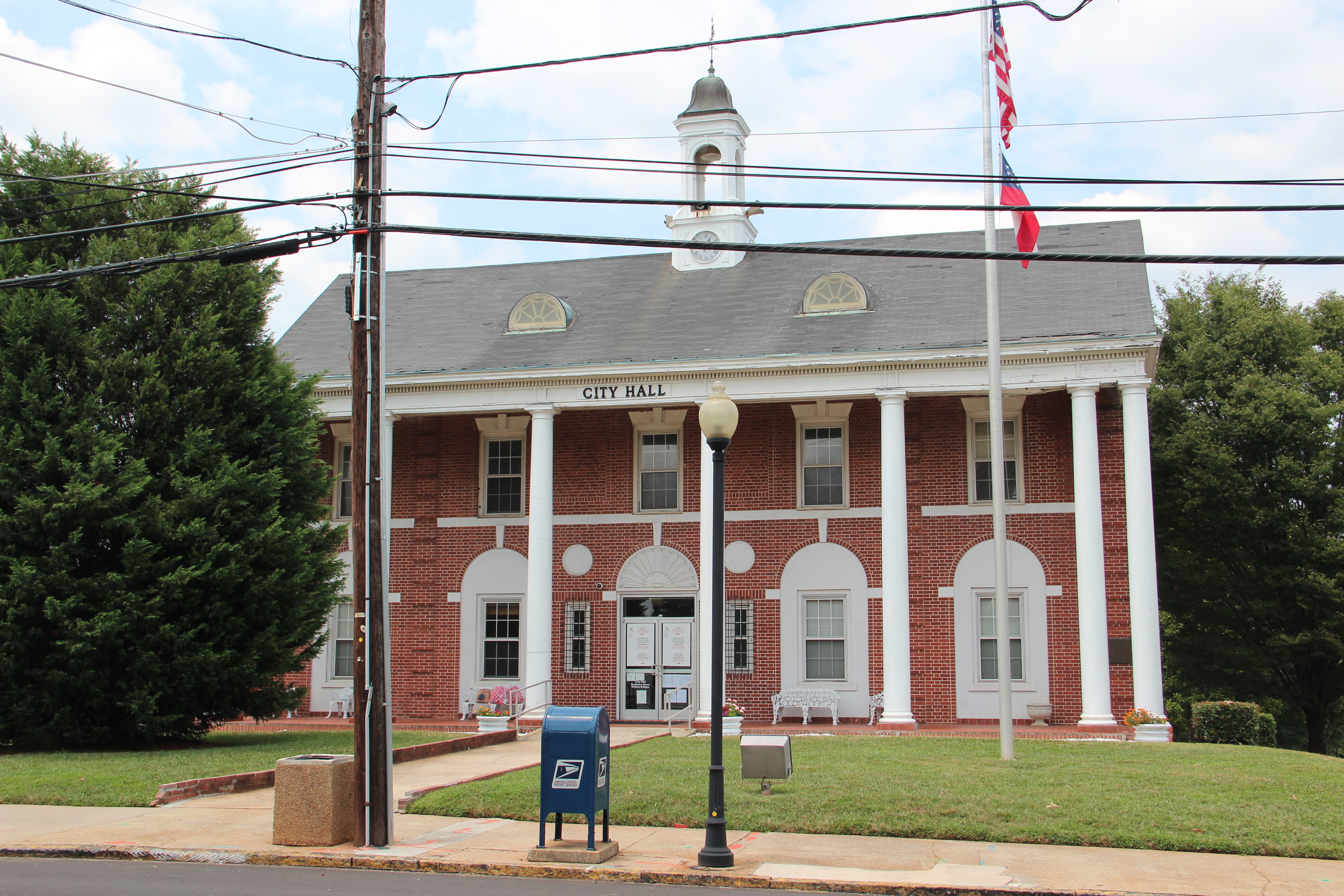
East Point City Hall

The East Point City Hall, built in 1930, completed in 1931 in a mixture of Colonial Revival and Antebellum styles, is one of the city's most distinct structures. Its white columned colonnade, sunburst eyebrow dormers, and cupolaed clock tower are displayed on the city's flag and seal. It houses the Mayor's office, original Council chambers, and several other city staff offices. A two-story annex was added to the rear of City Hall in the 1960s, matching the building's red brick construction, but greatly encroached upon the courtyard in between City Hall and the Auditorium.

== East Point City Auditorium ==
Immediately behind City Hall is the East Point Memorial Auditorium, also known as the East Point City Auditorium, which was completed in 1931, matching the architectural style of City Hall. It features 1,500 seats with a balcony, palladian windows, quoined corners, decorative swags and medallions along the walls, and has a stage. Similar in size to the Little 5 Points venue, the Variety Playhouse, the East Point Auditorium has been the only venue of its size within two blocks of a MARTA train station. The City Auditorium has hosted city gatherings, stage productions, concerts, wrestling matches, and kindergarten and high school graduations. Up until 1934, the AME Atlanta Sunday School Association typically held its "City Wide, County Wide, Sunday School Mass Meeting" in the City Auditorium up until that year when the event was moved to the Wheat Street Baptist Church instead. In the early-2000s, several front rows of seats were removed to install a podium for City Council meetings.

=== Live music radio show ===
Various musical performers such as Jerry Reed, Charles Brown and his Rocking at Night Orchestra, the Clovers, Mr. Goggle Eyes, Billy Ford and his Tuneful Band, and the Count Basie Orchestra were among the artists who have performed at the East Point City Auditorium. In the early 1960s, the Georgia Jubilee weekly radio show was broadcast live from the East Point City Auditorium. The house band, the Dixie Playboys hosted artist including The Williams Brothers. In December 1961, Patsy Cline performed for a crowd of three hundred at the City Auditorium. Part of her performance was filmed for the Atlanta television show, the Dixie Jubilee.

=== 1983-1984 renovation ===
Renovation on the Auditorium began in 1983 and was finished in 1984. Donors to the project had their names inscribed on brass plaques, which were affixed to the backs of the seats.

== New Deal Library ==
The original East Point Library, also known as the New Deal Library, constructed in a Federal Revival-style in 1939, bears a brass plaque attesting to its construction as part of President Franklin D. Roosevelt’s Federal Emergency Administration of Public Works (FEAPW) in 1939. (FEAPW was renamed the Public Works Administration shortly after the Library’s construction.) Almost all of the Library’s original features remain intact, including the dark wood bookcases, shelving, and Adam-style fireplace mantels. Other prominent features of the building are the Art Deco-style lighting fixtures. The Library operated until November 8, 1994, when city voters chose to make the East Point library a part of the Fulton County Library system. Soon after, the City closed the library and sold the books. In the mid to late 1990s, the Library was used as office space for the East Point Water Department, and as event space for staff holiday parties, and then later as storage.

== Victory Park ==
Victory Park, dedicated to East Point citizens who died in service to the country, is in front of the Library. The Park, anchored on each side by large magnolias, is home to a number of memorials, naming East Pointers who died in battle. Old armory is interspersed among the memorials, old trees, period lighting and park benches. Victory Park’s first memorial was placed in the period 1920–1930, dedicated to those who died in World War I. Several other plaques were placed over the years, following wars involving the U.S. including Desert Storm. The Park was formally dedicated October 24, 1971.

== History ==
All three buildings on the East Point Historic Civic Block had their construction financed by public bonds, with City Hall and the Auditorium financed in a $65,000 building program. The City Clerk and City Electrician were the first to have their offices moved to City Hall. The first floor also holds a reception hall for the payment of taxes and bills, and the second floor houses the Council Chambers, the Mayor's office, and the original office for the Chief of Police. In April 1931, the first events to be held in the Auditorium were revival services officiated by evangelist Gypsy Smith Jr. The dedication of the auditorium was held on May 28, 1931. "Col. Ed L. Humphreys acted as Master of Ceremonies. The keys of the building were given to the city by Dr. J.A. Yeast, chairman of the Bond Commission...The music for the occasion was furnished by the Russell High School band... The Auditorium and City Hall completed the civic block for East Point. Two fine buildings a credit to any town or city."

=== Government Center threat ===
In 2011, the City Council issued a Request for Proposals (RFP) for “a Multi-Purpose Government Complex” which called for the tearing down of several—if not all—of the existing buildings. One possible approach described in the RFP described the construction of a large, new City Hall complex built around the existing Auditorium while the other called for the demolition of all three historic buildings to make way for the proposed Government Complex. A group of concerned citizens contacted the Mayor and questioned the need for the demolition of East Point's historical downtown structures. They wanted to tour the auditorium to see its condition. The Mayor requested a tour on behalf of the citizens. The Mayor's request was turned down by the City Manager who then had the auditorium condemned by the Fire Marshal and Chief Building Official.

== Preservation campaign ==
=== Demolition by neglect ===
In 2011, after the citizens' request to tour the buildings was turned down, the group of citizens joined with East Point property owners, business owners, former citizens, and East Point alumni to form the East Point Preservation Alliance (EPPA), and worked towards preserving the historical architecture and character of downtown East Point. Most of the damage to the auditorium had been caused by a leak in the roof which the city had failed to patch or cover. The EPPA brought to light the ongoing demolition by neglect perpetrated by the city for continually neglecting to have the hole covered. It remains uncovered to this day. Many citizens showed up in protest at Council meetings where the developers presented their plans for a new government complex with a parking deck. None of the three plans presented preserved all three buildings, and although one plan included the Auditorium, two plans recommended Victory Park to be replaced by a parking deck or a small playground. After increased media and public scrutiny, all the developers pulled out from the projected scheme.

=== Centennial Quilt ===
In the lobby of the City Auditorium was a custom display case which held the East Point Centennial Quilt. The Centennial Quilt was made in 1987, as part of the Centennial Celebration of East Point’s founding in 1887. "The East Point Woman’s Club created a quilt illustrating East Point history, historic landmarks and prominent businesses. The quilt features 49 squares that were embroidered or appliquéd by hand by 26 members of the Woman’s Club. EPHS member Mildred Finnell, who was chairman of the Woman’s Club art department at the time, designed many of the squares and oversaw making of the quilt. Finnell said she called on club members to identify personal recollections of East Point history and then transfer those ideas to the individual squares. Club members then spent 1200 hours at quilting bees piecing together and quilting this history of East Point in needlework." But after the City Auditorium had been condemned, the quilt was trapped inside. In November 2011, after continued requests from the EPPA and the East Point Historical Society, the City Council voted to allow the Centennial Quilt to be moved to the East Point Historical Society for safe storage and display.

=== EEC Building Inspection Report ===
In February 2012, the EPPA was successful, with the help of City Council and the Mayor, in securing an assessment of the structures. The resulting EEC Building Inspection Report (Edwards Engineering Consultants, LLC) listed the repair costs for all three buildings at $1,451,500.

=== Renewed interest ===
In 2013, after renewed interest by Council in a City Center development, a multi-layered proposal was put forth by East Point City Center Partners, in which two different plans were presented. Both plans proposed the demolition of City Hall, and while one plan called for the relocation of the New Deal Library, it was later found that the library could not be moved due to its foundation. The second plan called for all new construction with the demolition of all three buildings. On May 20, 2013, Council voted 6 to 1 to demolish City Hall, Auditorium, the Customer Care Center, and Fire Station #1 and relocate the library, so that a new Government Center, conference center, parking deck, and performing arts center could be built on the site.

The EPPA continued to advocate for the rescue, renovation and reuse of the Civic Block. Alarmed citizens, upon hearing of the impending plan, joined the EPPA anew. In August 2013, the Sundance Channel pursued the New Deal Library as a location for a TV pilot. The Sundance Channel was going to finance the Library's remediation as a part of the deal. The City and the Channel were not able to finalize the agreement, and the pilot was filmed elsewhere.

=== Places in Peril ===
The EPPA applied for the East Point Civic Block's inclusion into the Georgia Trust for Historic Preservation's 2014 list of Places in Peril, but did not make the list. Places in Peril is designed to raise awareness about Georgia's significant historic, archaeological and cultural resources, including buildings, structures, districts, archaeological sites and cultural landscapes that are threatened by demolition, neglect, lack of maintenance, inappropriate development or insensitive public policy. Through Places in Peril, the Trust encourages owners and individuals, organizations and communities to employ proven preservation tools, financial resources and partnerships in order to reclaim, restore and revitalize historic properties that are in peril.

The East Point Historic Civic Block was identified by the Georgia Trust for Historic Preservation in its 2015 list of the 10 places in Peril. With its inclusion into the 2015 Places in Peril List, the story of the East Point Civic Block has received nationwide attention. The next step in the preservation of the East Point Civic Block is gaining access to the auditorium and library, so that preservation experts can assess and make recommendations. So far, access has not been granted by Council or City Manager.

== Adjacent buildings ==
A few other building adjacent to the East Point Historic Civic Block have been mentioned as historically significant, but have not been included in preservation efforts as of yet. One corner to the north of City Hall is East Point Fire Station #1, no longer in daily use, but frequently used as a staging area for safety personnel during events regularly held in the downtown area.

Diagonally across from City Hall to the northeast is the East Point Pharmacy. The building has been retooled as a few different businesses over the years, but most recently was used as storage for the East Point Main Street Association. It has a very distinctive antique mural "Service for the Sick" on its north face and Art-Deco signage. A notice of condemnation was posted on its doors during the summer of 2014.
