= Georgia Trust for Historic Preservation =

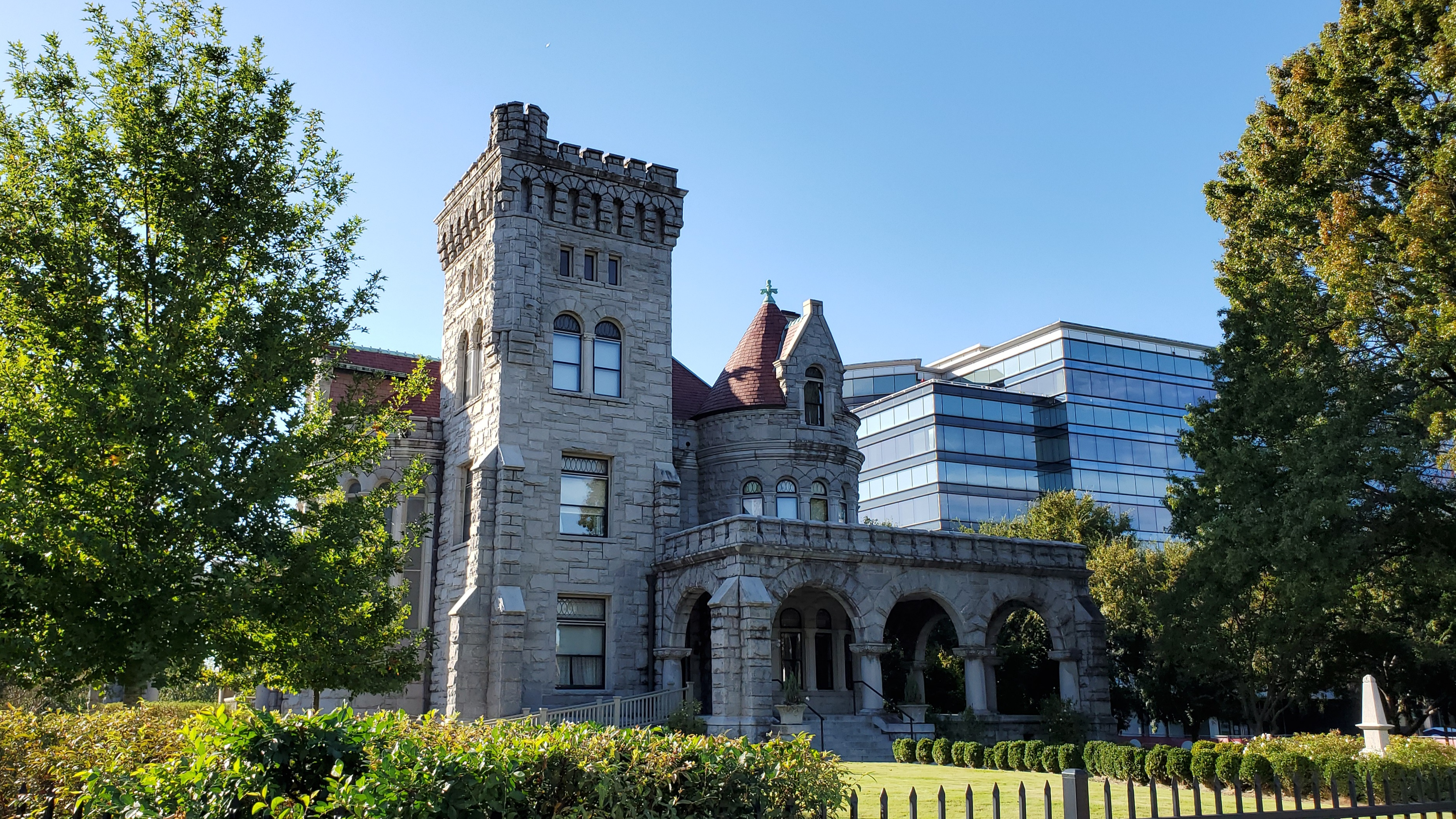
- Rhodes Hall, headquarters for the Georgia Trust, in 2020
- Nickname: Georgia Trust
- Formation: April 12, 1973 (53 years ago)
- Founders: Several, including Mary Gregory Jewett
- Founded at: Macon, Georgia
- Type: Nonprofit
- Registration no.: 23-7357226
- Purpose: Historic preservation
- Headquarters: Rhodes Memorial Hall; Atlanta, Georgia; United States
- Coordinates: 33°47′45.5″N 84°23′18″W
- Members: 3,500 (2024)
- Chair: Karen Gravel
- President and CEO: W. Wright Mitchell
- Main organ: The Rambler
- Revenue: $4.1 million (2024)
- Expenses: $1.9 million (2024)
- Website: www.georgiatrust.org

The Georgia Trust for Historic Preservation is the United States' largest statewide, nonprofit preservation organization that seeks to preserve and enhance Georgia's communities and their diverse historic resources for the education and enjoyment of all. Founded in April 1973, by a group including Mary Gregory Jewett, the Trust became the largest statewide preservation organization in the country by the 1980s.

The Georgia Trust helps find buyers for endangered properties acquired by its Revolving Fund; partners with Georgia’s State Historic Preservation Office in the Department of Community Affairs; has encouraged neighborhood revitalization and provided design assistance to 105 Georgia Main Street cities since 1984; and advocates for funding, tax incentives and other laws aiding preservation efforts. The Georgia Trust operates historic house museums the Hay House (1859, Macon) and Rhodes Hall (1904, Atlanta).

One of its most well-known programs is its annual Places in Peril list which has listed 10 places per year since 2006 with significant historical value and community support that is at imminent risk of being lost.

== Places in Peril ==
Since 2006, the Georgia Trust releases an annual list of endangered historic sites throughout Georgia. The Places in Peril program seeks to identify significant historic, archaeological and cultural properties that are threatened by demolition, deterioration or insensitive public policy or development, and have a demonstrable level of community interest, commitment and support. Through this program, the Trust encourages owners and individuals, organizations and communities to employ preservation tools, partnerships and resources necessary to preserve and utilize selected historic properties in peril.

Historic properties are selected for listing based on several criteria. Sites must be listed or eligible for listing in the National Register of Historic Places or the Georgia Register of Historic Places and must be subject to a serious threat to their existence or historical, architectural and/or archeological integrity. There must also be a demonstrable level of community commitment and support for the preservation of listed sites.

The Trust listed 200 sites from 2006 to 2025, and claimed that 95% of those structures were still standing in February 2026.

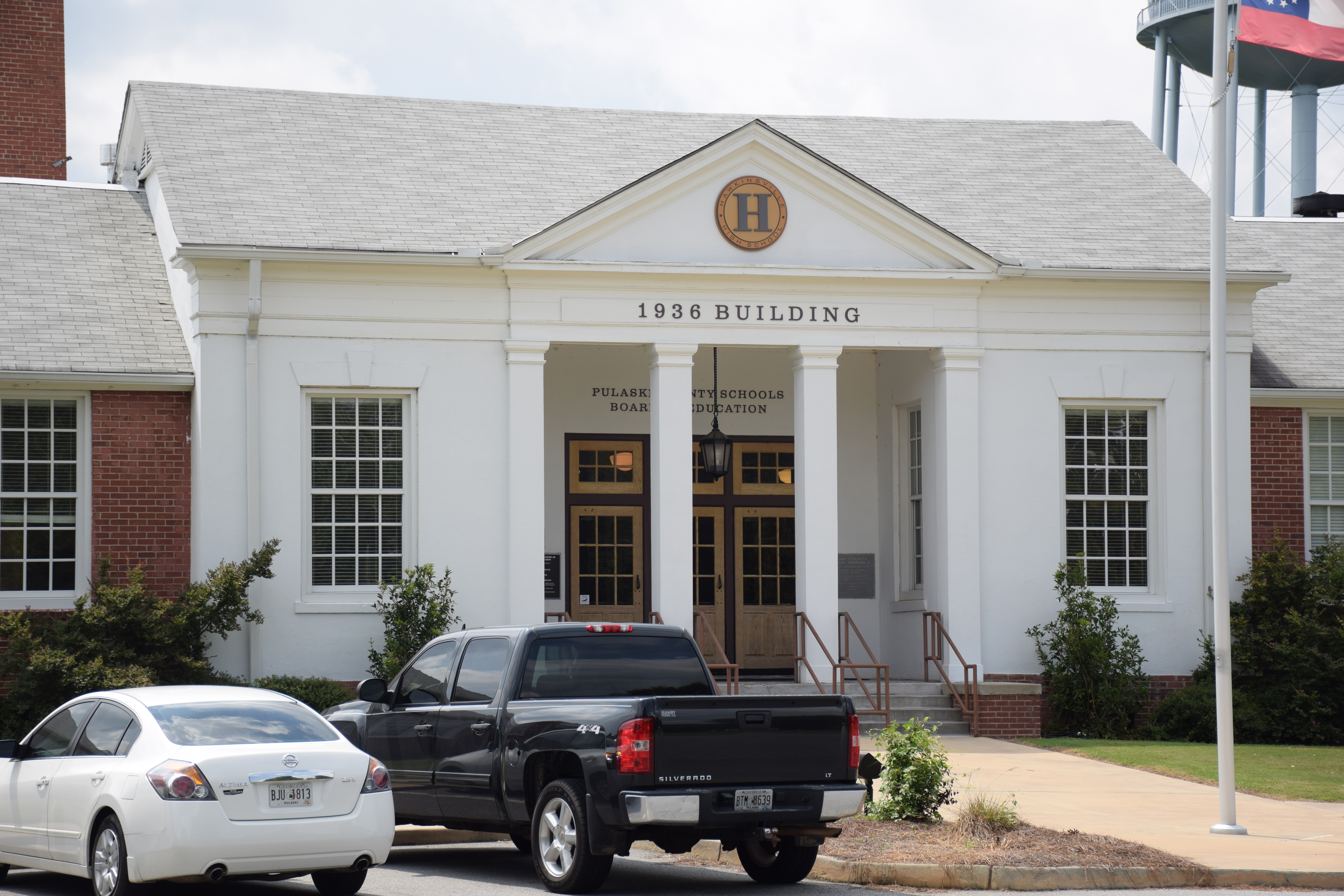
Old Hawkinsville Public School

=== 2006 ===
- Auburn Avenue Commercial District, Atlanta

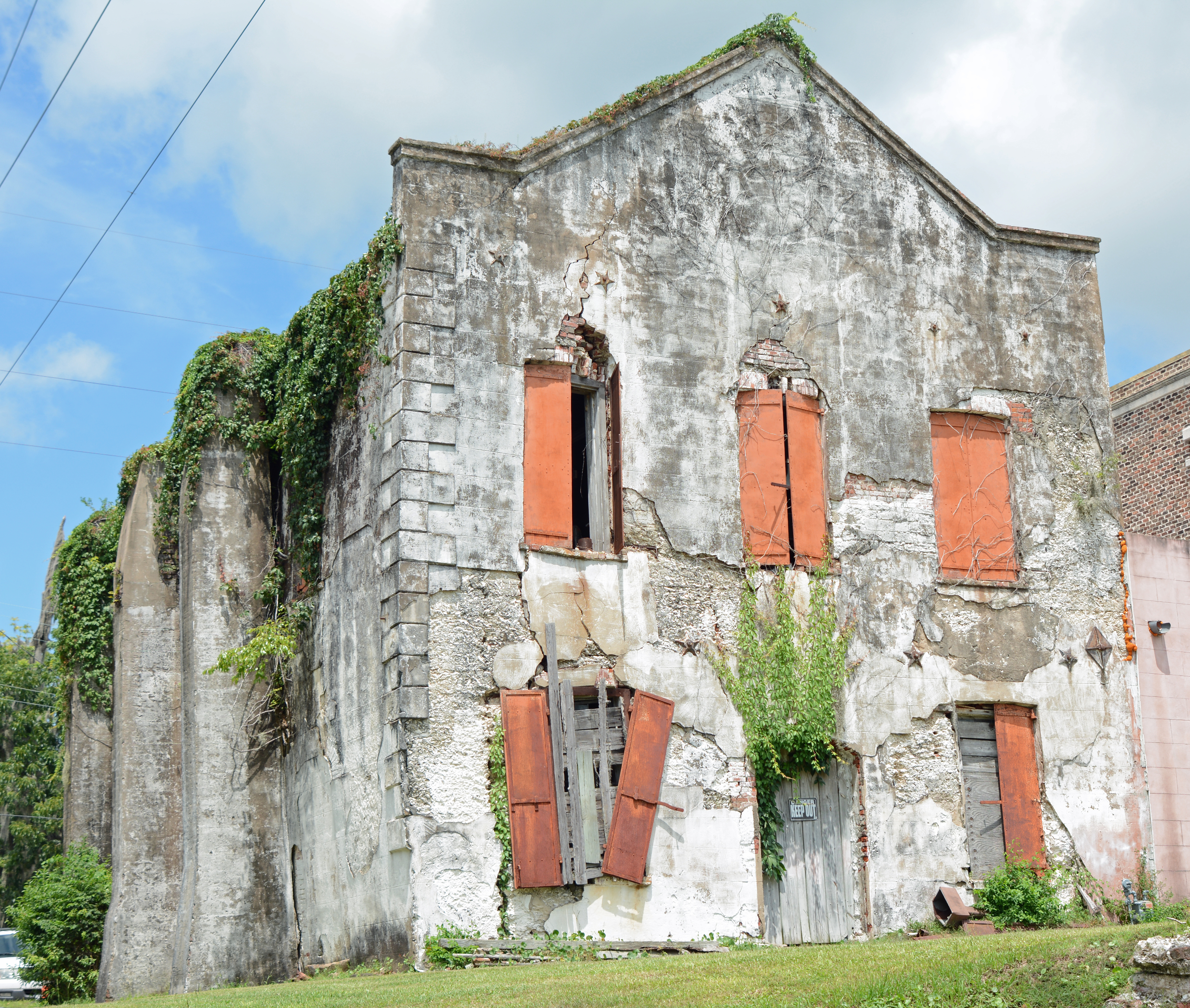
Adam Strain building, Darien

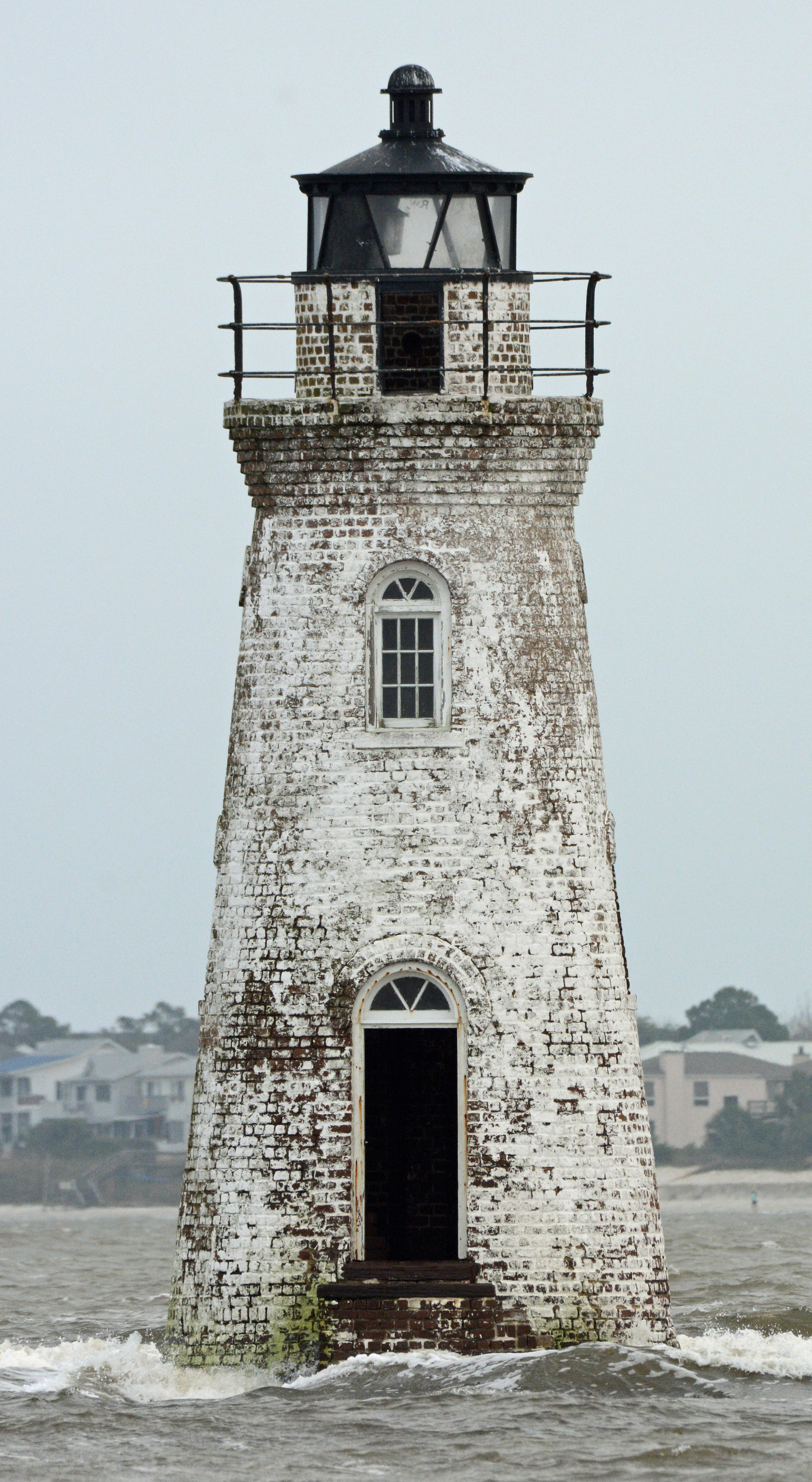
Cockspur Island Lighthouse

=== 2008 ===
- Adam-Strain Building, Darien - now slated to be saved
- Cockspur Island Lighthouse, Tybee Island
- University of Georgia Marine Institute Greenhouse & Administration Building, Sapelo Island

=== 2009 ===
- Battery Backus, Tybee Island
- John Berrien House, Savannah
- Bibb Mill, Columbus
- Campbell Chapel AME Church, Americus
- Crum & Forster Building, Atlanta
- Fort Daniel, Buford
- Mary Ray Memorial School, Newnan-Coweta County
- Metcalfe Township, Thomas County
- Rock House, Thomson
- Sallie Davis House, Milledgeville

=== 2010 ===
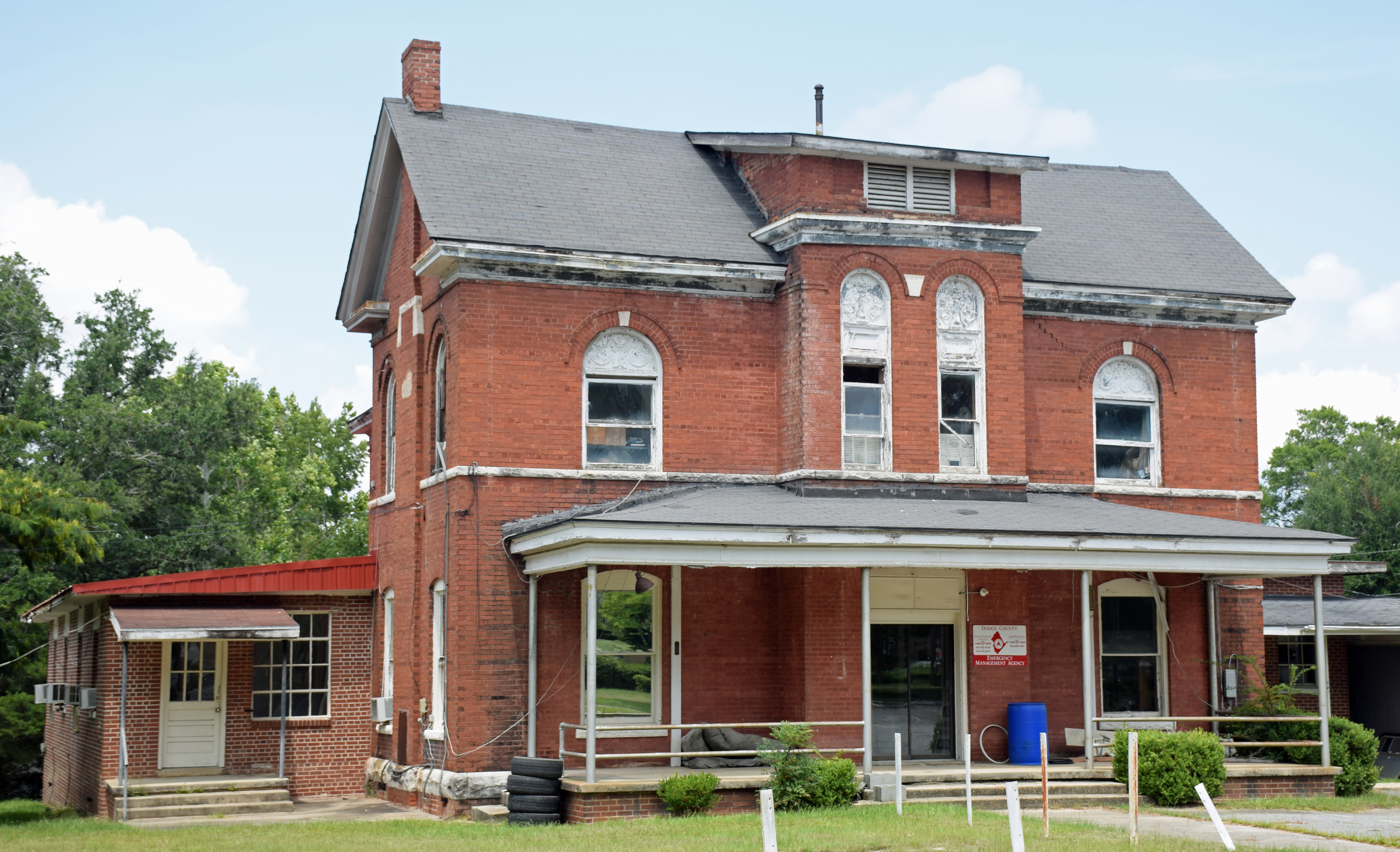
The old Dodge County Jail, on the NRHP

- Central State Hospital, Milledgeville
- Paradise Gardens, Summerville
- Morris Brown College, Atlanta
- Canton Grammar School, Canton
- Leake Archaeological Site, Cartersville
- Dorchester Academy, Midway
- Old Dodge County Jail, Eastman
- Ritz Theatre, Thomaston
- Herndon Plaza, Atlanta
- Capricorn Recording Studio, Macon

=== 2013 ===
- Tift Warehouse, Albany
- Candler Park Golf Course, Atlanta
- Sweet Auburn Commercial District, Atlanta
- Dobbins Mining Landscape, Bartow County
- Stilesboro Academy, Bartow County
- Cave Spring Log Cabin, Floyd County
- Monticello Commercial Building, Jasper County
- Lexington Presbyterian Church, Oglethorpe County
- Hancock County Courthouse, Sparta
- Travelers Rest State Historic Site, Toccoa

=== 2014 ===
- Old City Hall, Griffin
- Greek revival style homes, Troup

=== 2015 ===
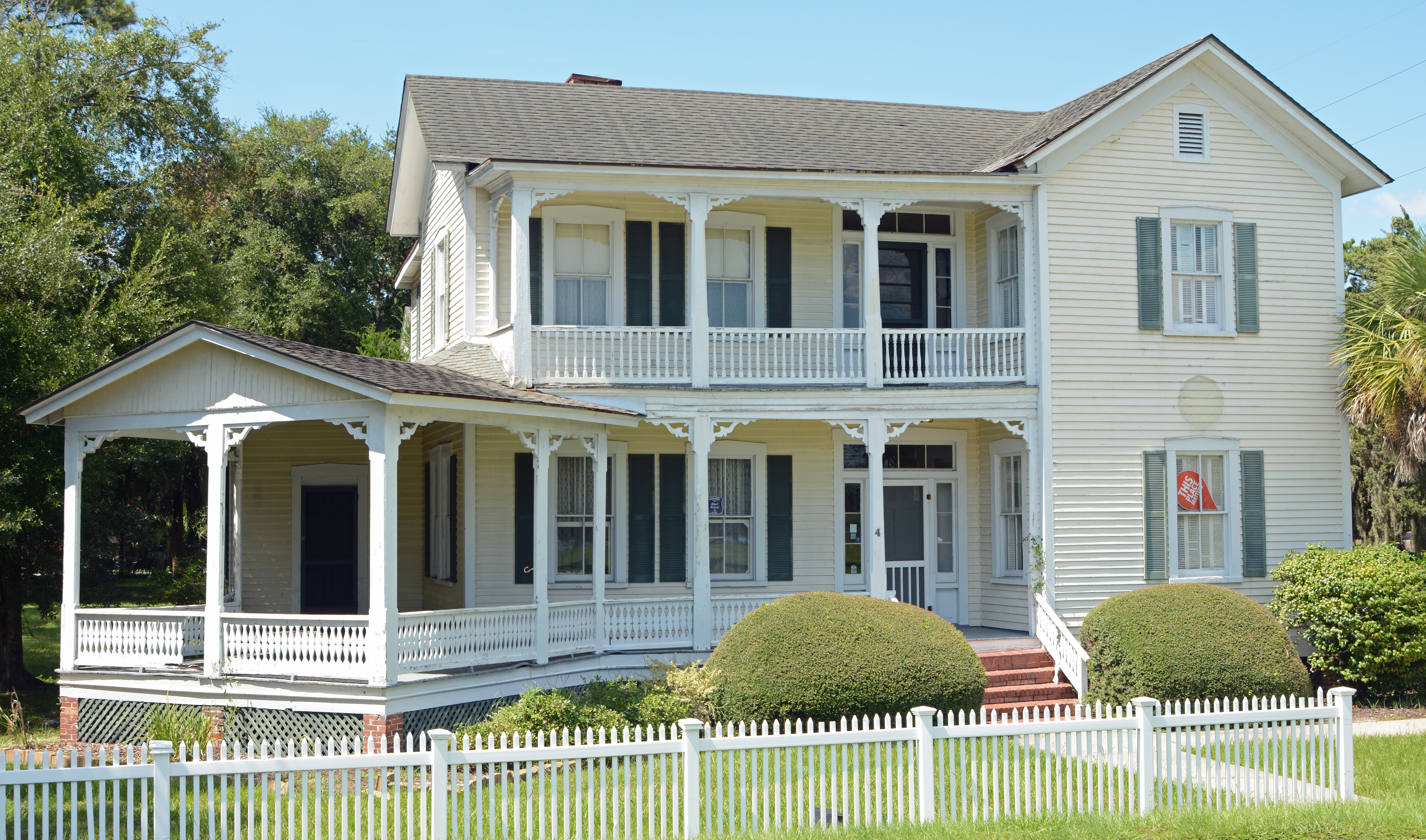
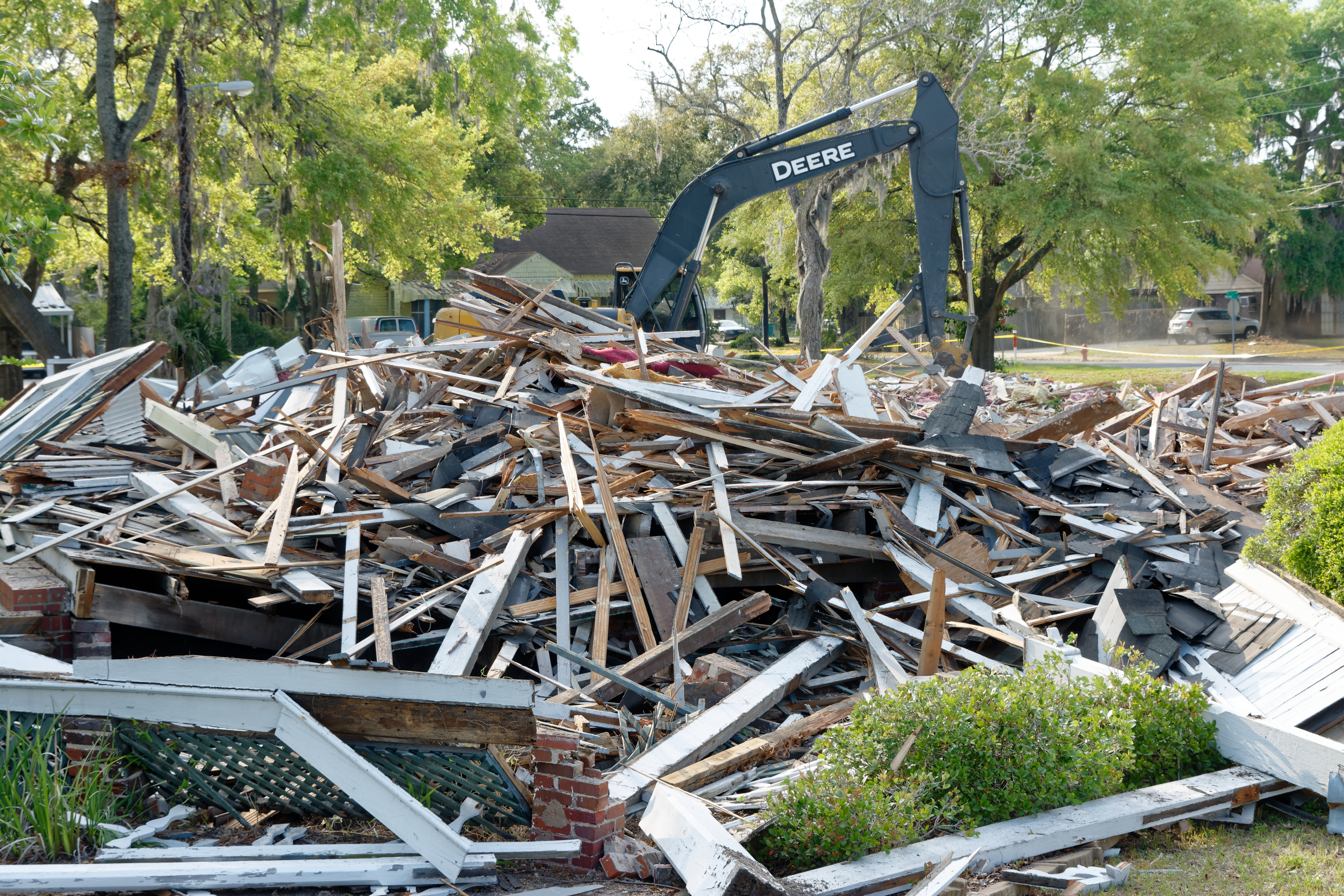
The Dart house in 2015 and after destruction in March 2017
- The East Point Historic Civic Block, East Point
- The Dart House (1877), Brunswick (demolished)
- Glenridge Hall, Sandy Springs
- Ware’s Folly, Augusta, Richmond County
- Mandeville Homestead, Carrollton, Carroll County
- Haistens Hospital, Griffin, Spalding County
- Portal Drugstore, Portal, Bulloch County
- Sandersville School, Sandersville, Washington County
- Hancock County Courthouse, Sparta, Hancock County
- The Federal Road/Lower Creek Trading Path, Located in 13 Georgia Counties

=== 2017 ===
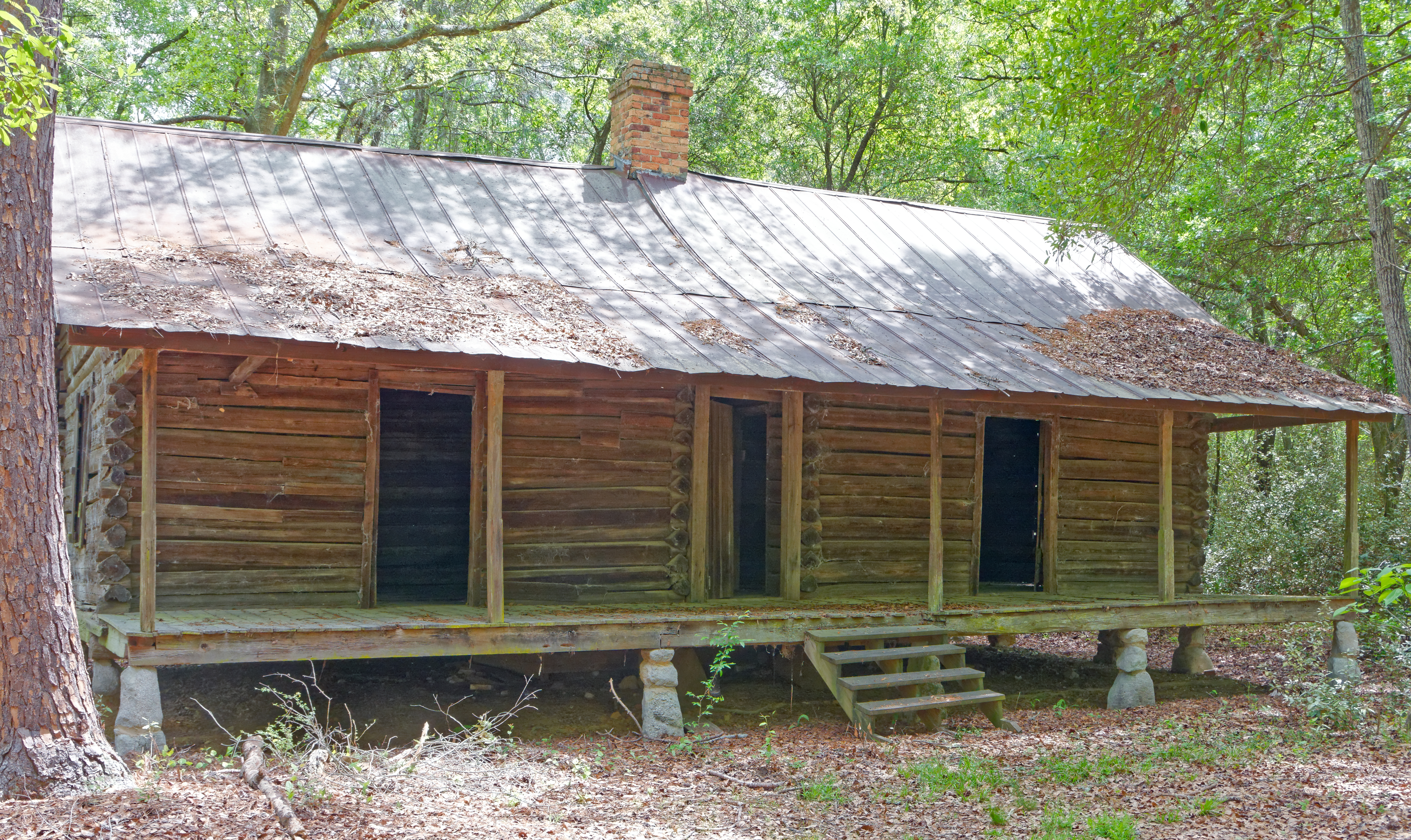
The John Rountree house, on the NRHP, 2017

Sources:

- Atlanta Central Library (1980), Atlanta, Fulton County, designed by Marcel Breuer.
- Calvary Episcopal Church (1921) and Lee Street Bridge, Americus, Sumter County
- Chivers House (1920), Dublin, Laurens County
- Marble YMCA Building, Columbus, Muscogee County
- Gaines Hall (1869), Furber Cottage (1899), Towns House (1910) and the Hamilton House (1950), Atlanta, Fulton County
- John Rountree Log House (1832), Twin City in Emanuel County
- Lyon Farmhouse (c.1820-1830), Lithonia, DeKalb County
- Mimosa Hall (1840), Roswell, Fulton County
- Walker House (Augusta, Georgia) (1895), in Richmond County, Georgia, associated with minister Charles T. Walker within the historic African-American Laney-Walker Neighborhood
- Old Zebulon Elementary School, Zebulon, in Pike County

=== 2020 ===
- Antioch Baptist Church, Crawfordville
- Asbury United Methodist Church, Savannah
- Cary Reynolds Elementary School, Doraville
- Central State Hospital, Milledgeville
- Fountain Hall, Atlanta
- Heritage Park, Griffin
- John Nelson Deming home, Valdosta
- Masonic Lodge #238, Dalton
- Nolan Crossroads, Bostwick
- Rose Hill School, Porterdale

=== 2021 ===
Sources:

- Ashby Street Theatre, Atlanta
- Atlanta Eagle and Kodak Buildings, Atlanta
- Blackshear City Jail, Blackshear
- Cherry Grove Schoolhouse, Washington
- Cohutta African American Civic District, Cohutta
- Downtown Toomsboro, Toomsboro
- Kiah House Museum, Savannah
- Old Monticello United Methodist Church, Monticello
- Terrell County Courthouse, Dawson
- Vineville Avenue Corridor, Macon

=== 2022 ===
- Ansley Park, Atlanta
- Chattahoochee Brick Company, Atlanta

=== 2023 ===
Sources:

- 223 Auburn Avenue, Atlanta
- McConnell-Chadwick House, Atlanta
- Old Campbell Courthouse, Atlanta
- Beulah Grove Lodge and School in Douglasville (Douglas County)
- Lee’s Mill Ruins on the Flint River in Forest Park, (Clayton County)
- Chickamauga Masonic Lodge No. 221 in Chickamauga (Walker County)
- Dasher High School in Valdosta (Lowndes County)
- Dudley Motel, Cafe and Service Station in Dublin (Laurens County)
- Wilkes County Training School in Washington (Wilkes County)
- Yates House in Ringgold (Catoosa County)

=== 2024 ===
Sources:

- Atlanta Constitution Building, Fulton County
- Piney Grove Cemetery, Fulton County
- Broad Avenue Elementary in Albany (Dougherty County)
- Cedar Grove in Martinez (Columbia County)
- Church of the Good Shepherd in Thomasville (Thomas County)
- Grace Baptist Church in Darien (McIntosh County)
- Hog Hammock on Sapelo Island (McIntosh County)
- Old First Baptist Church in Augusta (Richmond County)
- Pine Log Mountain (Bartow County)
- Sugar Valley Consolidated School in Sugar Valley (Gordon County)

=== 2025 ===
Sources:

- Southeastern Railway Museum, Duluth
- 148 Edgewood Avenue, Atlanta
- Collier-Toomer House, Savannah
- Crossroads Rosenwald School, Dixie
- Gaissert Homeplace, Williamson
- Miami Valley Peach Packing Barn, Fort Valley
- Historic Nicholsonboro Baptist Church, Savannah
- Powell Opera House, Blakely
- Historic Rock House, Thomson
- Buckhead Town Hall and Jail, Buckhead

=== 2026 ===
- Egleston Hall, Atlanta
- Wayne County Courthouse, Jesup (NRHP)
- McCranie's Turpentine Still, Willacoochee (NRHP)
- Orange Hall, St. Mary’s
- Salem Campground, Covington
- Civilian Conservation Corps Camp at Hard Labor Creek State Park, Rutledge
- Legion Pool at the University of Georgia, Athens
- Thomas L. Bell Memorial Ballpark, Americus
- Union Brothers and Sisters Mission Hall, Meridian
- Boggs Rural Life Center, Keysville

== See also ==
- Atlanta Preservation Center
- John Linley
