= John Linley =

American photographer and architect

- Born: John William Linley; June 23, 1916; Anderson County, South Carolina, U.S.
- Died: 3 May 1996 (aged 79); Anderson County, South Carolina, U.S.
- Resting place: Silver Brook Cemetery, Anderson, South Carolina
- Education: Clemson College; Princeton University
- Occupations: Photographer, author
- Notable work: Architecture of Middle Georgia: The Oconee Area (1972); The Georgia Catalog, Historic American Buildings Survey: A Guide to Georgia Architecture (1982)

John William Linley (June 23, 1916 – May 3, 1996) was an American photographer and author. He wrote two books which are considered of high value to preservationists: Architecture of Middle Georgia, The Oconee Area (1972) and The Georgia Catalog, Historic American Buildings Survey, A Guide to Georgia Architecture (1982).

== Early life ==
Linley grew up Anderson, South Carolina, to John William Linley Sr. and Annie Farmer. Having been inspired by his father's construction business, he studied architecture at Clemson College, from which he graduated with a bachelor's degree. He then earned a Master of Fine Arts in architecture from Princeton University, graduating in 1945.

== Career ==
Linley began his career as an architect designing homes and office buildings. In 1963, he became a professor at the University of Georgia (UGA) in Athens, Georgia, in its School of Environmental Design.

He retired in 1986.

== Personal life ==
Outside of work, Linley served on the board of trustees for the Joseph Henry Lumpkin Foundation, the board of directors for the Athens–Clarke Heritage Foundation, and for the Athens Historical Society. He was also vice-president of the latter. He played an important role in the establishment of the Georgia Trust for Historic Preservation, which later had the largest membership of any non-profit preservation organization in the country.

Linley received the Georgia Trust for Historic Preservation and a Presidential Citation award from the Georgia Association American Institute of Architects.

In 1967, Linley bought a home at 530 Pulaski Street in Athens. Its yard included cobblestones which Linley had recovered after they had been discarded from College Avenue. Artist and photographer Rinne Allen later lived in the home.

Linley appeared in the video to R.E.M.'s 1991 single "Shiny Happy People".

== Death ==
Linley died in 1996, aged 79. He was interred in Silver Brook Cemetery in Anderson.
