= Kodak Building (Atlanta) =

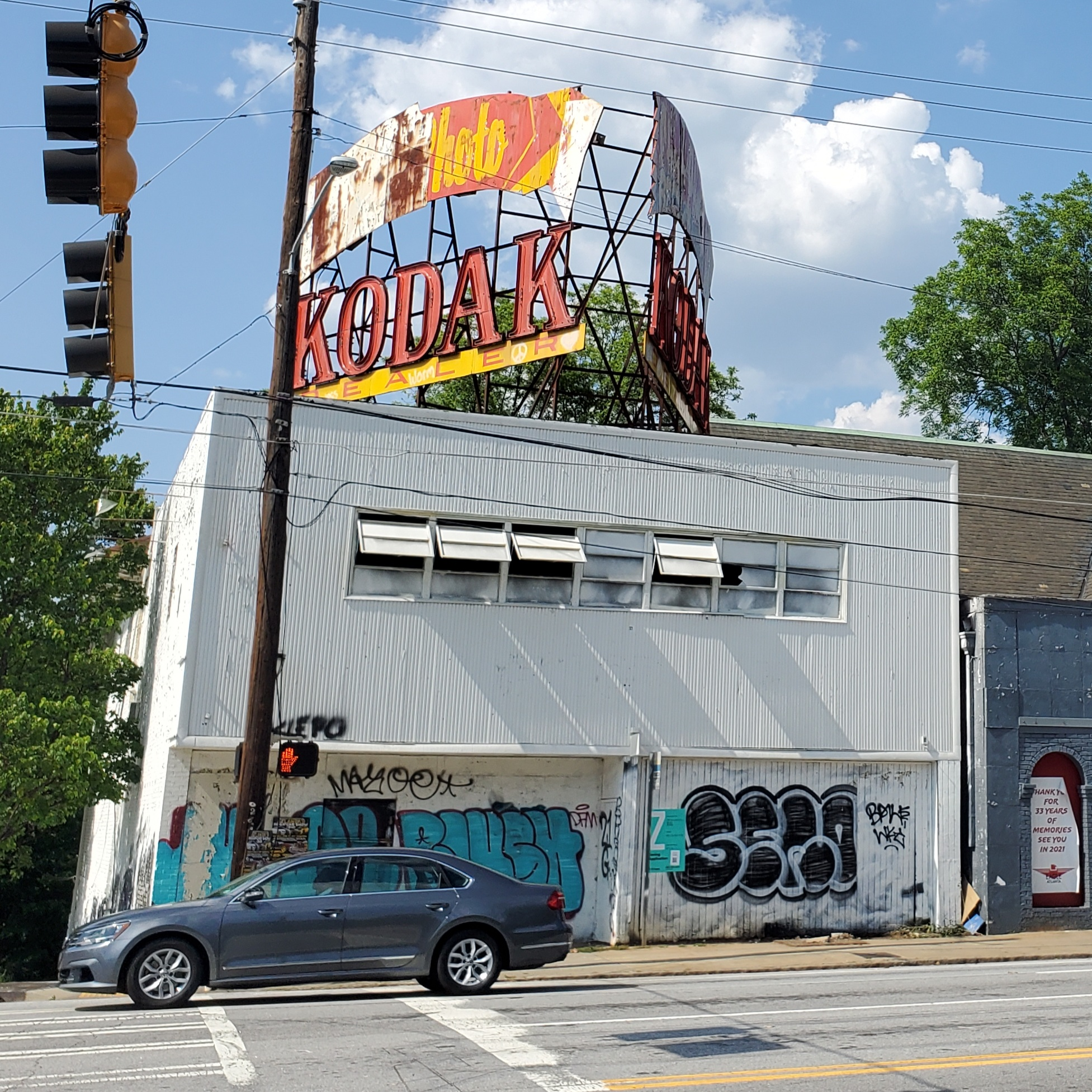
- Kodak Building (2021)

- Location within Atlanta Kodak Building (Atlanta) (Georgia) Kodak Building (Atlanta) (the United States)

General information
- Location: Atlanta, Georgia, 300 Ponce de Leon Avenue
- Coordinates: 33°46′22.224″N 84°22′39.18″W
- Completed: c. 1905

Technical details
- Floor count: 3

The Kodak Building is a historic building in Atlanta, Georgia, located at 300 Ponce de Leon Avenue in Midtown Atlanta. Originally constructed around 1905 as a private residence, the building was later converted to commercial use and became known for a large Kodak advertising sign on its roof. The building has been vacant for many years, except for a brief period in the early 2000s when it served as a campaign headquarters. In 2021, the City of Atlanta designated the building's facade as a historic landmark. The building sustained fire damage in 2023 and again in 2024.

== History ==
The building was originally constructed around 1905 as an Italian Renaissance-style private residence. It is adjacent to the building at 306 Ponce de Leon Ave NE, which has housed the Atlanta Eagle, a gay bar, since the mid-1980s and was the subject of the Atlanta Eagle police raid in 2009. Star Photo moved into the Kodak Building in 1951 as Ponce de Leon Avenue was transformed into a busy commercial corridor, and during this period a large advertising sign for Eastman Kodak was added to the roof of the building. In the early 2000s, the building served as the campaign headquarters for Shirley Franklin during her 2001 run for mayor of Atlanta, which she won to become the city's first female mayor. The building has otherwise been vacant since that time.

Around 2009, the Kodak Building and Atlanta Eagle building were foreclosed on. The two buildings were sold in May 2014 for $1.9 million, with the Atlanta Eagle's lease renewed. As part of the sale agreement, the Kodak sign was to remain on the building. The buildings were sold again in 2016 for approximately $2 million, with plans announced to convert the Kodak Building into a healthcare center. Those redevelopment plans did not proceed.

=== Places in Peril listing ===
On November 11, 2020, the Georgia Trust for Historic Preservation listed the "Atlanta Eagle and Kodak Buildings" on its annual list of Places in Peril, noting the structures' disrepair and risk of demolition due to development pressure in the area.

=== Landmark designation ===
In January 2021, the City of Atlanta announced it was moving to designate the Kodak Building as a historic landmark, alongside the adjacent Atlanta Eagle building. On June 14, 2021, the City of Atlanta formally designated both properties as Landmark Building Sites. The designation protects the buildings' Ponce de Leon-facing facades from demolition or exterior alteration without written approval from the city's Urban Design Commission, but does not extend to the rear portions of the structures.

=== Fires ===
On July 25, 2023, a fire broke out in the vacant Kodak Building, causing damage to the structure. Atlanta Fire & Rescue investigated the cause, and no injuries were reported.

On June 7, 2024, a fire broke out at the adjacent former Atlanta Eagle building at 306 Ponce de Leon and spread to affect the Kodak Building. The rear portions of both buildings, which are not covered by the landmark designation, sustained heavy damage, while the brick facades along Ponce de Leon remained standing. No injuries were reported and Atlanta Mayor Andre Dickens said the fire did not appear to involve malicious intent.

On July 18, 2024, a second fire broke out specifically in the Kodak Building, with heavy flames reported at the rear of the structure. Firefighters contained the blaze within approximately 25 minutes, preventing it from spreading to the adjacent Atlanta Eagle building. No injuries were reported. The cause of the July 2024 fire remained under investigation.
