= Beulah Grove Lodge No. 372, Free and Accepted York Masons =

Historic building in Georgia, United States

- Beulah Grove Lodge No. 372, Free and Accepted York Masons--Pleasant Grove School
- U.S. National Register of Historic Places
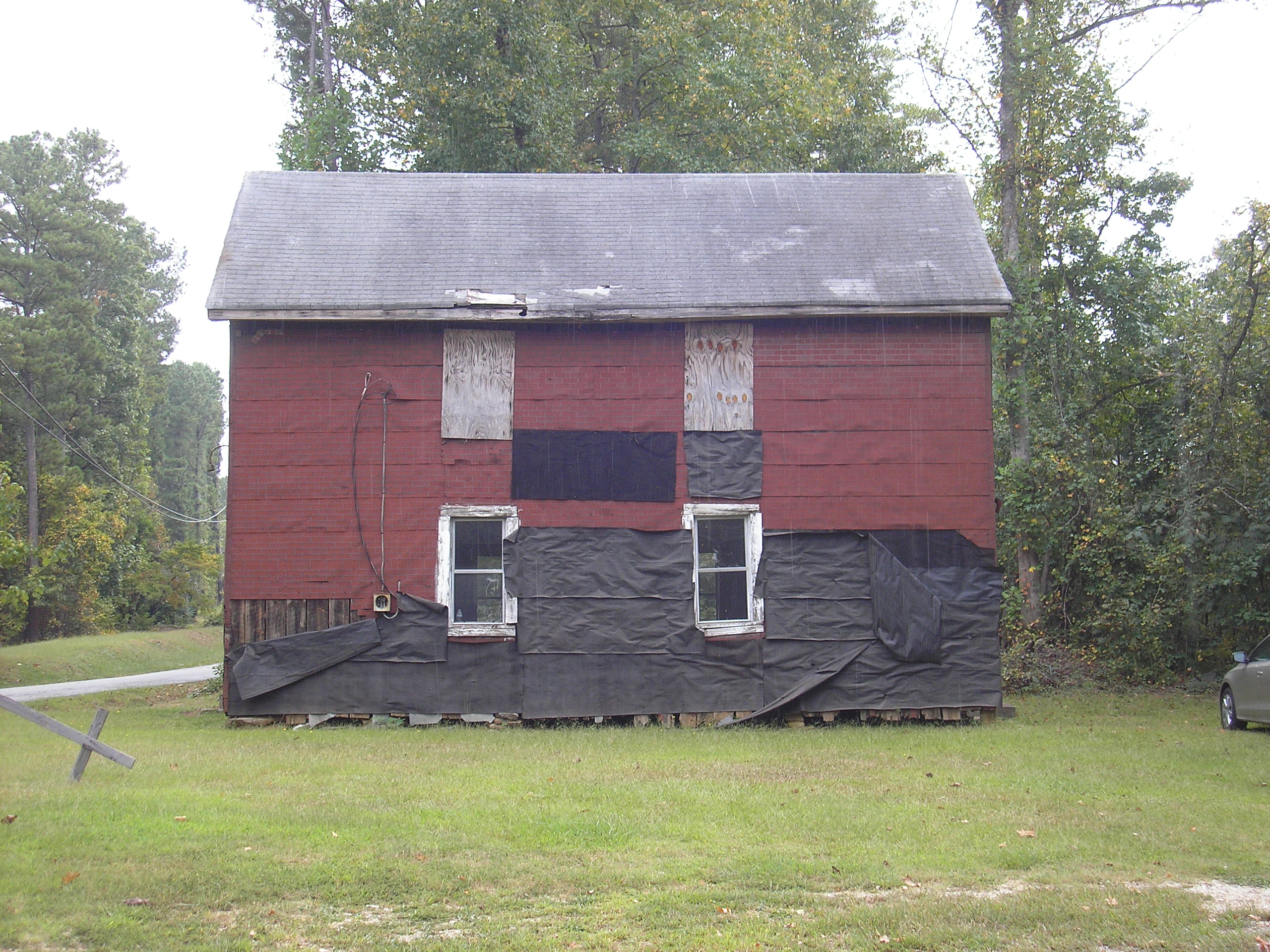

- Location within Georgia
- Location: 2525 Old Lower River Rd., near Douglasville, Georgia
- Coordinates: 33°42′24″N 84°39′29″W
- Area: less than one acre
- Built: 1910
- NRHP reference No.: 09001301
- Added to NRHP: February 3, 2010

The Beulah Grove Lodge No. 372, Free and Accepted York Masons, also known as Pleasant Grove School and Pleasant Grove Colored School, in Douglas County, Georgia near Douglasville, Georgia, was built in 1910. It was listed on the National Register of Historic Places in 2010.

It is a two-story wood building.
