= Wayne County Courthouse (Georgia) =

Historic courthouse in Georgia, US

- U.S. National Register of Historic Places
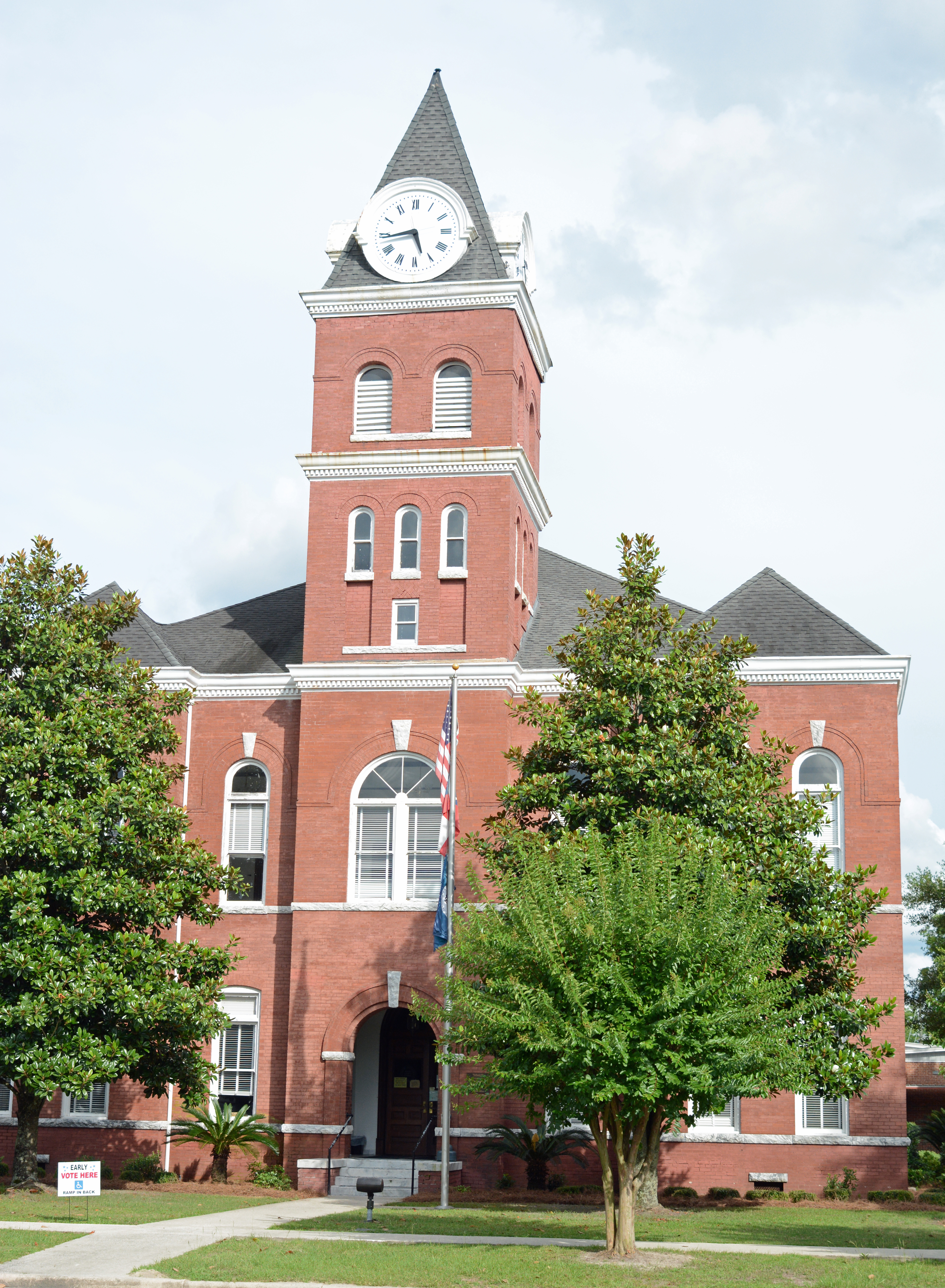
- The courthouse in 2015

- Location within Georgia Location within the United States
- Interactive map showing the location of Wayne County Courthouse
- Location: Courthouse Sq., Jesup, Georgia
- Coordinates: 31.603889°N 81.88°W
- Area: 1 acre (0.40 ha)
- Built: 1902
- Built by: Darling, T.J.
- Architect: Baker, S.A.
- Architectural style: Romanesque
- MPS: Georgia County Courthouses TR
- NRHP reference No.: 80001261
- Added to NRHP: September 18, 1980

The Wayne County Courthouse is located in Jesup, Georgia. It was built in 1902 with Romanesque style elements including a rounded front doorway. It is constructed of brick and stone with metal trim. The interior has a cross plan. There are hooded clocks on all four sides of its tower.

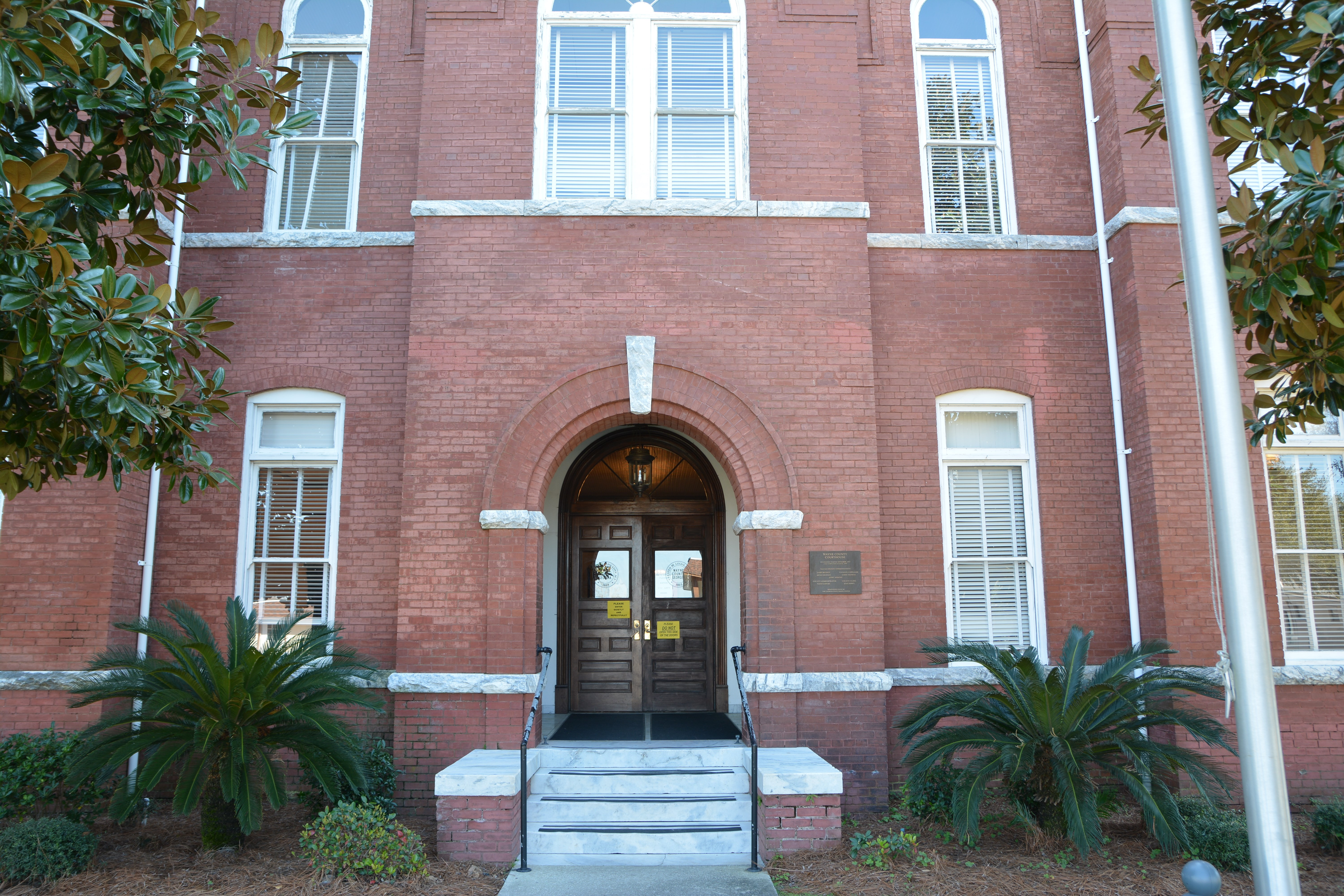
Entrance way, in 2017

It was added to the National Register of Historic Places in 1980.
