= Gentrification of Baltimore =

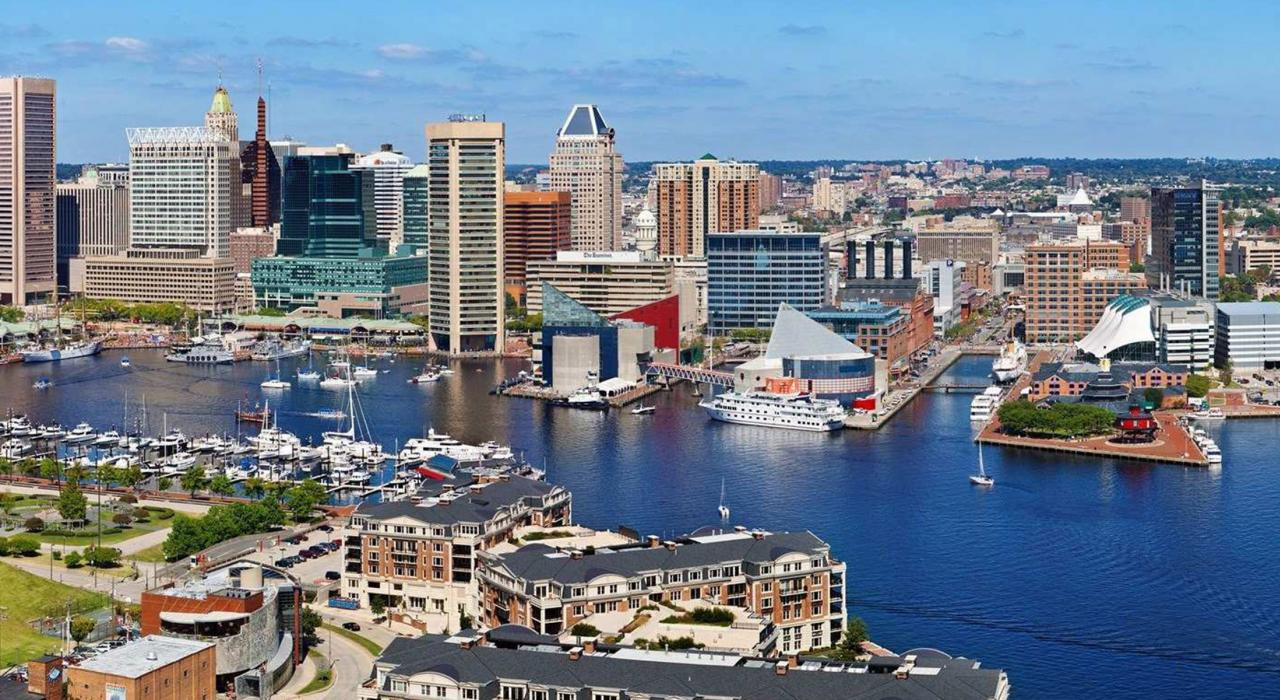
Baltimore Skyline

The gentrification of Baltimore, Maryland began around 2000 and continues to transform the city by redeveloping specific neighborhoods to appeal to new residents. Due to Baltimore's gentrification, the city accounts for a significant amount of American gentrification. The gentrification of Baltimore has occurred in the neighborhoods surrounding the Inner Harbor in Central Baltimore and East downtown Baltimore. The gentrification of Baltimore has occurred through the renovation of historic and vacant properties in addition to new housing shopping centers and offices. The rejuvenation has occurred in a select number of neighborhoods, but the amenities, shopping and job opportunities have provided wider benefits for Baltimore residents. These neighborhoods have also provided the majority of the growth of tax revenue for the city government. However, many others feel that gentrification is unfavorable for Baltimore because it displaces current residents from their homes due to rising prices in newly gentrified neighborhoods.

== History ==
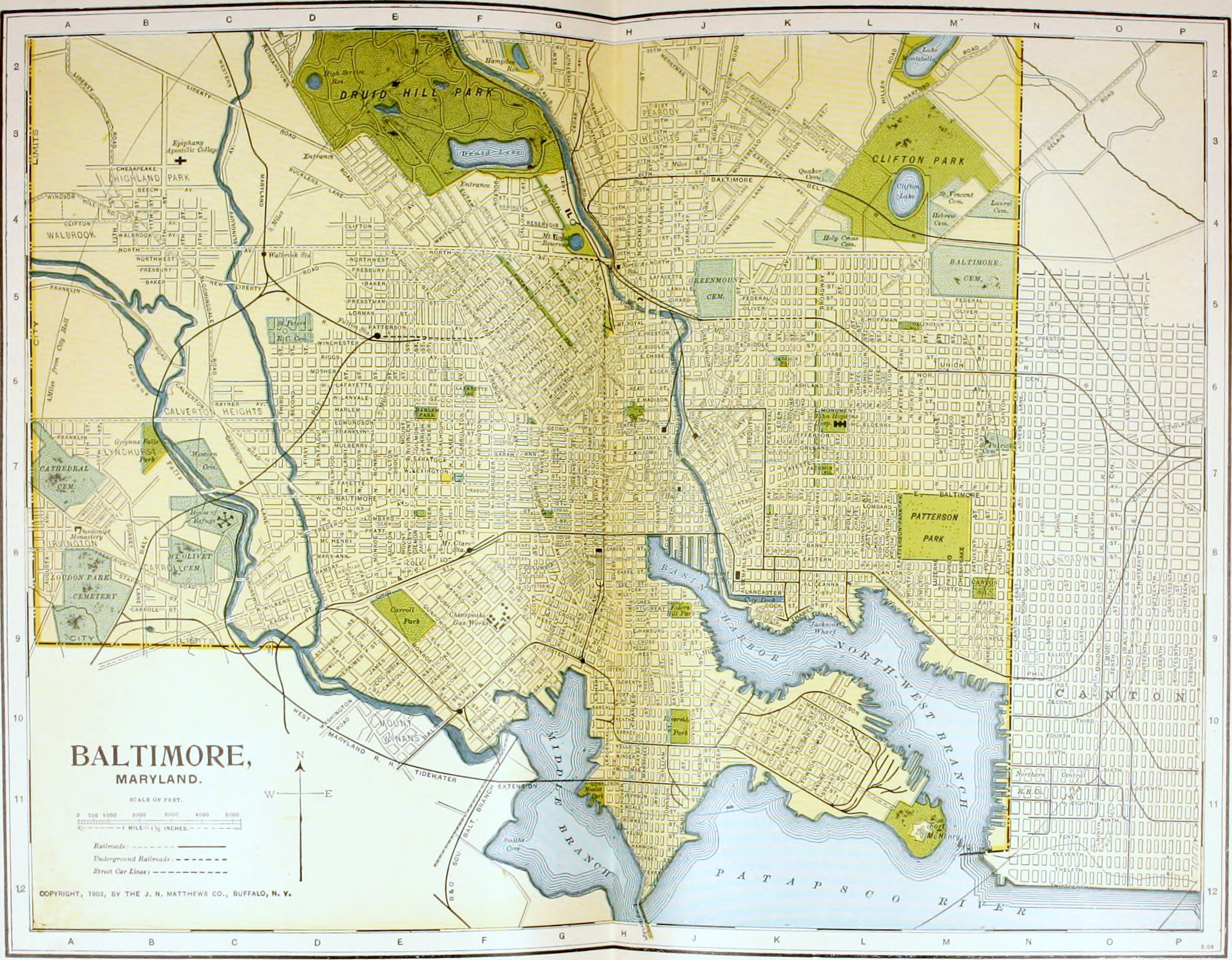
Map of Baltimore from 1905

Around the 1930s, Baltimore’s development to its current state would begin. During this time, various new commercial areas were integrated into central downtown Baltimore, making it a destination with many attractions. This brought many people to Baltimore; thus, many new roads were developed. However, during this time, one of the most significant problems in Baltimore began: redlining. With redlining, certain minority groups, especially African Americans, were not allowed to live in specific neighborhoods of Baltimore. This created an extremely segregated city that can still be seen today, especially as the city is being gentrified.

Later on, from the 1960s through the 1980s, the city continued to be developed as officials attempted to organize the city. During this time, lots of funding was put into the city to incorporate new low-income housing, new schools, and more. However, the city began to struggle due to violence, poverty, and addiction. These problems have taken over many Baltimore neighborhoods, which are now being gentrified due to the lower price of the property.

== Effects of gentrification ==
With the arrival of wealthy developers coming into low-income neighborhoods, the landscape of Baltimore, Maryland, is completely changing. One of the most significant ways developers gentrify neighborhoods is by developing new housing. Most developers purchase run-down or cheap properties in low-income communities and build entirely new properties. These new properties tend to be much more expensive and attract wealthier buyers. Thus, building more expensive housing often can displace the current residents out of their neighborhood because they can no longer afford to live there. For example, in East Baltimore, the average home price jumped from $65,008 in 2000 to $203,000 in 2010. In Baltimore, this has been a massive problem as many residents have been displaced due to higher prices post-gentrification. However, the displacement in Baltimore is unique because you see both white and black displacement, which is not very common.

In addition to housing, developers have reimagined various neighborhoods in Baltimore City by adding new commercial spaces. New retail spaces in Baltimore have been built from the ground up, and many older buildings have been transformed into new spaces. One example of the gentrification of an older building in Baltimore is the Sagamore Pendry Hotel, which is now a luxury boutique hotel in a gentrified area, but it used to be a pier where new immigrants arrived. Additionally, there is a wide variety of new stores and restaurants throughout the city. Generally, this has been a positive thing for the city of Baltimore, as it is attracting more people to come into the city after a period when many feared the city. New commercial spaces have also helped improve the economy as more individuals have been able to open new restaurants and stores where they can make a living.

== Gentrification debate ==
=== For gentrification ===
Many argue that all of the gentrification occurring throughout Baltimore, Maryland is highly positive for the city and taking it in a better direction. The main argument for those who favor gentrification is that all of the change throughout Baltimore beautifies the city. They feel that most of Baltimore's new commercial and residential spaces transform previously neglected properties into attractive buildings. As new buildings are popping up all over the city, it can also be seen that many neighborhoods appear to be cleaner than before. Due to many neighborhoods being revitalized by developers, property value has significantly increased throughout the city of Baltimore, which many are extremely pleased about.

Many also argue that gentrification is excellent for Baltimore because it provides many new job opportunities. There are a variety of jobs available once a neighborhood goes through gentrification. For example, while the neighborhood is in the middle of being transformed, there are many construction jobs available due to all of the development occurring. However, that is not where it ends. Post-construction, there are many new jobs available where there are typically a variety of new retail spaces and restaurants brought into gentrified areas for individuals to work.

Although there is still a significant amount of crime throughout the city of Baltimore, gentrification is helping reduce crime rates around the city. This brings many people to be in favor of gentrification because, in the past, crime has been one of the most significant issues in Baltimore, and many efforts have been ineffective in reducing crime.

Additionally, many are in favor of gentrification because it increases education levels. Most college graduates throughout the country are likely to move to urban gentrified areas like Baltimore, Maryland. Thus, many lower-income students living in these gentrified neighborhoods are more likely to attend college because they are exposed to role models in their neighborhood who graduated from college. Overall, all of these factors have helped bring people back into the city of Baltimore after a period when people avoided the city.

=== Not for gentrification ===
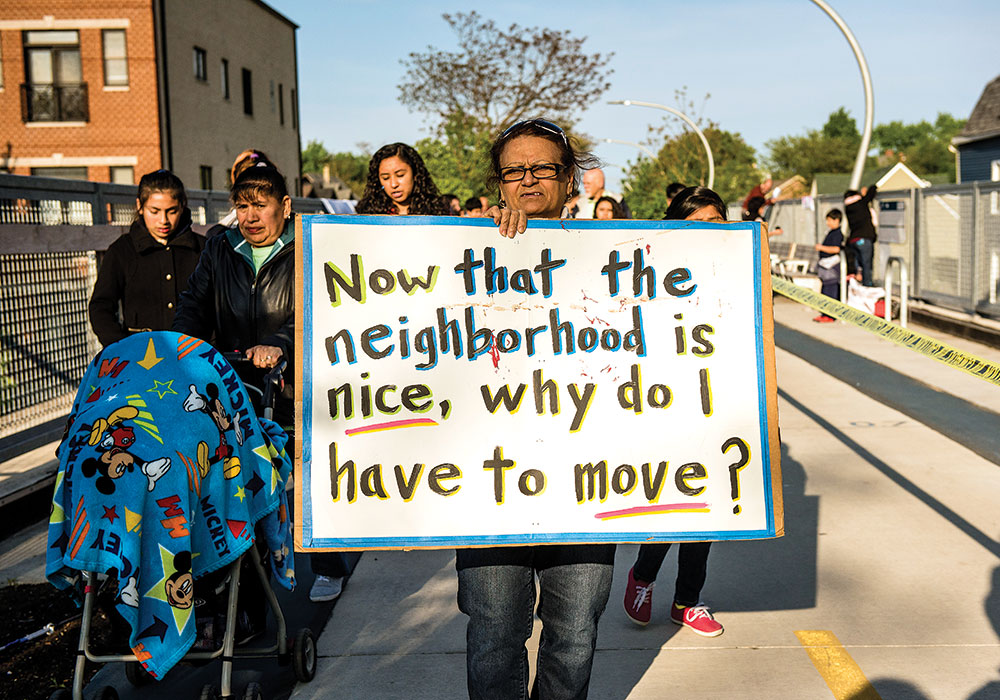
Protesting gentrification

The second side of the gentrification debate is individuals who feel that gentrification is only doing more harm than good for the city of Baltimore. The main argument of these individuals is that gentrification is displacing thousands of individuals throughout the city. The displacement occurs due to two factors: not being able to afford the cost of living anymore and being actively forced out of their homes due to eminent domain law. Once these individuals are forced out of their homes and neighborhoods, they are often not provided with any assistance in finding new affordable housing. Gentrification has also created a racial divide through the displacement of minority groups throughout Baltimore, as more money is invested into predominantly white neighborhoods.

Another reason that many people feel that gentrification is not good for the city of Baltimore is that the transformation occurring is only done for wealthier individuals. Baltimore's leaders have primarily focused on the more affluent neighborhoods to bring money back into the city. However, this has only made people more enraged as the people who need support in their communities are not receiving it. With the mission of bringing wealthier residents into the city, very little low-income housing is being developed as gentrification occurs. Overall, many do not support gentrification efforts because they feel that the gentrification occurring throughout Baltimore creates a wealth divide and continues to create a racial divide after so much progress.

Many argue that gentrification forces a loss of history throughout the city; thus, they are not in favor. Many historic sites are demolished for new spaces to be built. However, once those landmark sites are torn down, the vibrant history of Baltimore can be forgotten. For instance, in 2019, many residents of the Woodberry neighborhood in Baltimore were outraged because two 19th-century stone homes were demolished to make way for a new apartment complex.

== Gentrification by neighborhood ==
=== Hampden ===
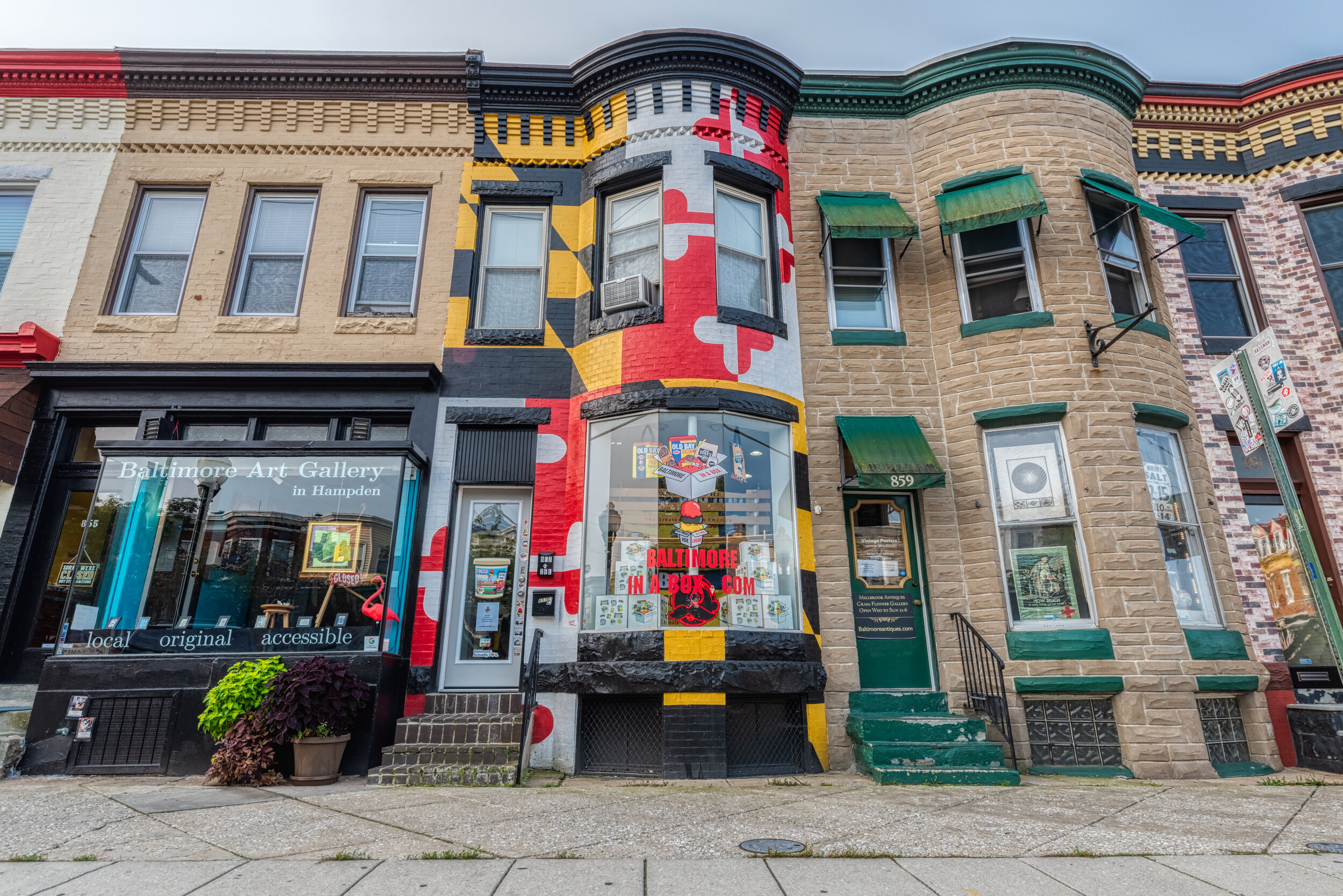
Hampden

Hampden, a vibrant neighborhood in Baltimore, has seen extreme gentrification. This neighborhood has become an attractive area for anyone to live in, but especially college students and graduates. As the number of college graduates in this neighborhood has almost tripled, the home prices have nearly doubled. As more people have moved into Hampden, a variety of new restaurants and stores have opened. Thus, Hampden has become a desirable location for people from all around Baltimore to visit. Due to the increased desirability of Hampden, developers continue to come into the neighborhood to develop new housing and commercial spaces. However, most of the developers in Hampden attempt to preserve the area's history by transforming current buildings rather than building entirely new structures. For example, many old textile mills have been turned into apartments and offices in this neighborhood.

=== Canton ===
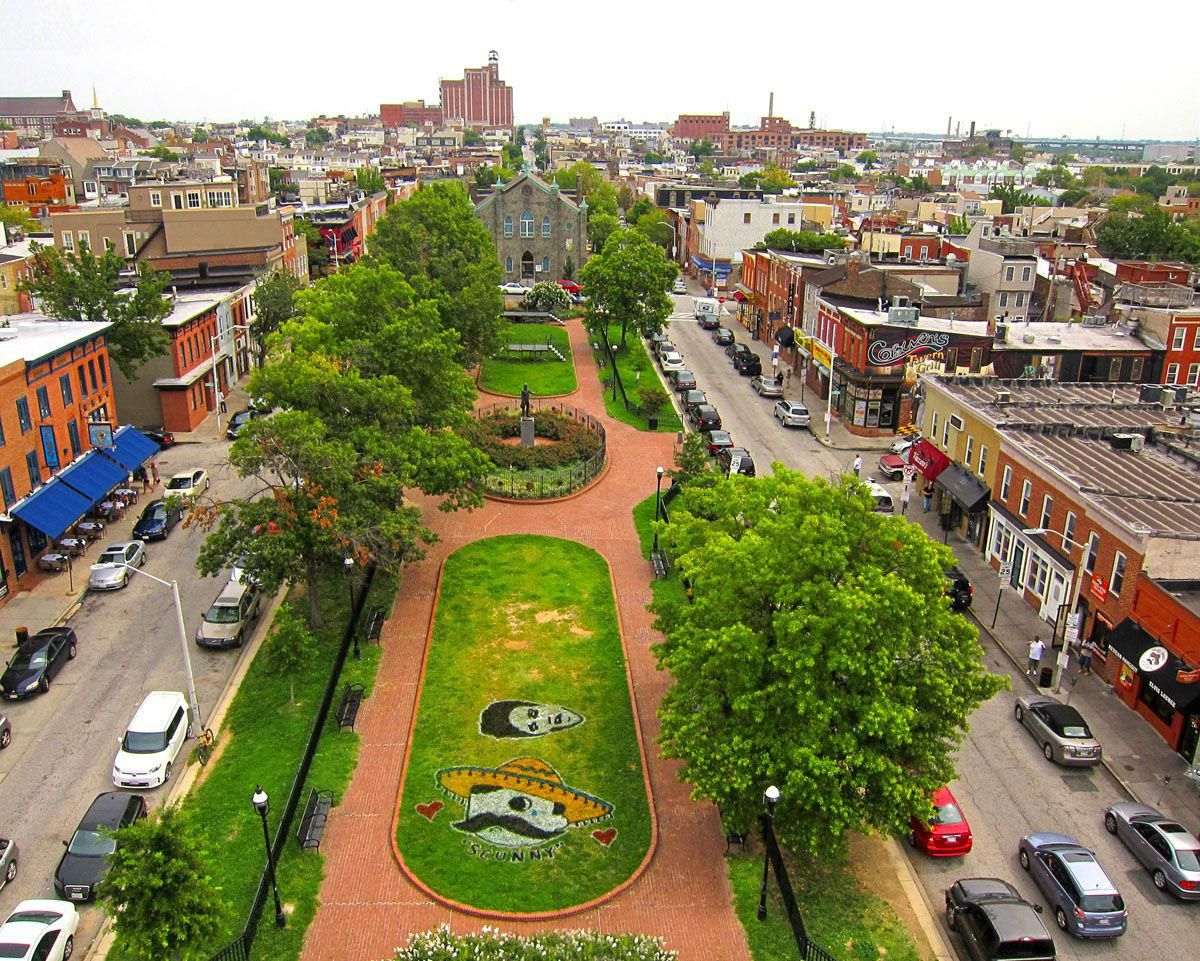
Canton

Canton, a waterfront neighborhood that used to be an industrial area of Baltimore, has become one of the trendiest areas of Baltimore, Maryland, due to gentrification. This neighborhood has seen an immense addition of commercial spaces. These commercial spaces include restaurants, hotels, gyms, and various stores. The variety of new commercial spaces has attracted many young professionals to move to Canton. Thus, developers have also gentrified the area by adding a variety of new housing ranging from row homes to apartments. The home values in Canton have increased by 107% from 2000 to 2016 as the neighborhood continues to be transformed. Canton has seen so much gentrification that it has been ranked the 16th most gentrified zip code in the United States from 2000 to 2016.

=== Federal Hill ===
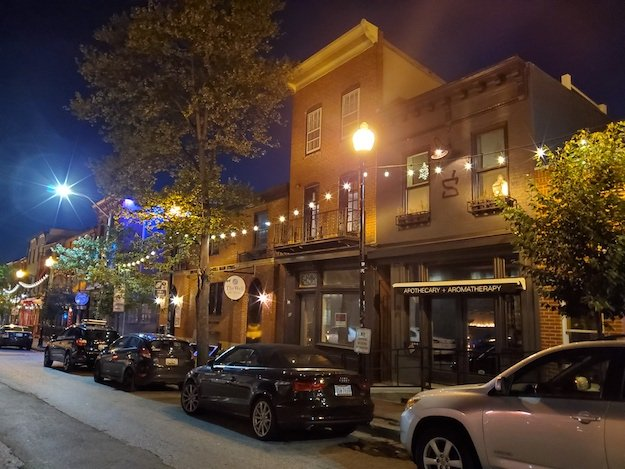
Federal Hill

Federal Hill, a neighborhood of Baltimore that looks over the Inner Harbor, has undergone a tremendous amount of gentrification, making it a lively and desirable community. The neighborhood is filled with historic buildings that various developers have revitalized. Alongside these historic buildings are a variety of brand new structures that have been built as the community has been gentrified. These new buildings are both housing and commercial spaces. Like many of the other gentrified areas of Baltimore, there are various stores, restaurants, bars, and more in this community. Many outdoor spaces have also been added to Federal Hill as the neighborhood has been gentrified. These new attractions have caused many young professionals and families to move to this neighborhood. All of the community spaces that have been added to Federal Hill throughout the gentrification have brought the community together.

== See also ==
- Gentrification in the United States
- Gentrification of Atlanta
- Gentrification of Miami
- Gentrification in Philadelphia
- Gentrification of Chicago
- Gentrification of San Francisco
