= Gentrification of Portland, Oregon =

During the early 2000s, displacement of minorities in Portland, Oregon, occurred at a drastic rate. Out of 29 census tracts in north and northeast Portland, ten were majority nonwhite in 2000. By 2010, none of these tracts were majority nonwhite as gentrification drove the cost of living up. Today, Portland's Black community is concentrated in the north and northeast section of the city, mainly in the King neighborhood. However, despite claims of gentrification, Portland's white population has continued to shrink as a share of the city's overall population every census since 1940.

In 2017, Portland, Oregon was named the fourth fastest gentrifying city in the United States by Realtor.com. At least one author has ascribed the "urban containment" effect on rising housing prices to Portland's urban growth boundary.

== See also ==
- Gentrification of Atlanta
- Gentrification of Chicago
- Gentrification in Philadelphia
- Gentrification of San Francisco
- Gentrification of Vancouver
