= Gentrification of Atlanta =

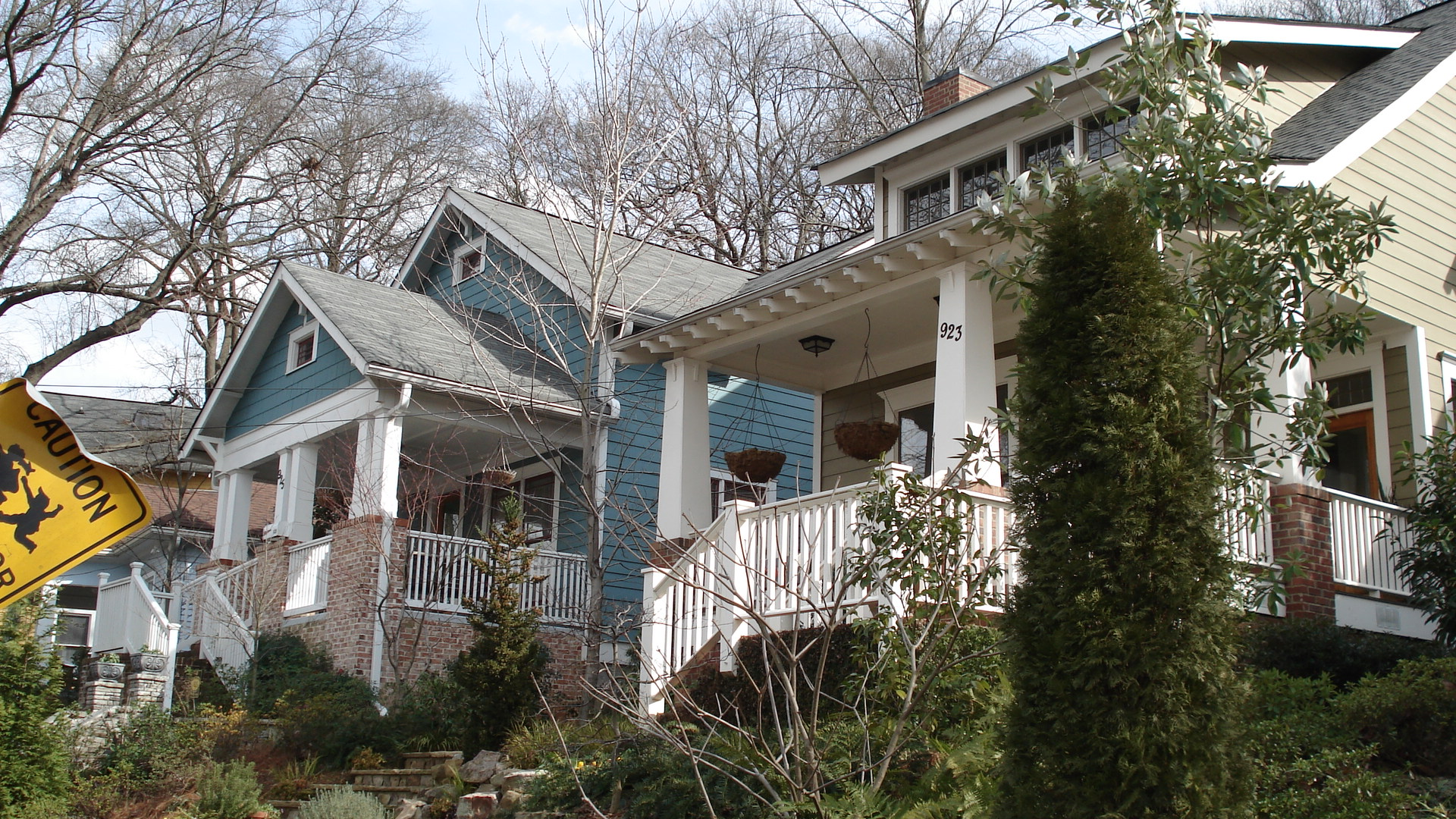
Bungalows in Atlanta's Inman Park neighborhood

Gentrification of Atlanta's inner-city neighborhoods began in the 1970s, and it has continued, at varying levels of intensity, into the present. Many factors have contributed to the city's gentrification. A major increase in gentrification that occurred in the last years of the 20th century has been attributed to the 1996 Summer Olympics. However, during the 2000s, Atlanta underwent a profound transformation demographically, physically, and culturally. Suburbanization, rising prices, a booming economy, and new migrants decreased the city's Black percentage from a high of 67% in 1990 to 54% in 2010. From 2000 to 2010, Atlanta gained 22,763 white residents, 5,142 Asian residents, and 3,095 Hispanic residents, while the city's Black population decreased by 31,678. Much of the city's demographic change during the decade was driven by young, college-educated professionals: from 2000 to 2009, the three-mile radius surrounding Downtown Atlanta gained 9,722 residents aged 25 to 34 holding at least a four-year degree, an increase of 61%. Between the mid-1990s and 2010, stimulated by funding from the HOPE VI program, Atlanta demolished nearly all of its public housing, a total of 17,000 units and about 10% of all housing units in the city. In 2005, the $2.8 billion BeltLine project was adopted, with the stated goals of converting a disused 22-mile freight railroad loop that surrounds the central city into an art-filled multi-use trail and increasing the city's park space by 40%. Lastly, Atlanta's cultural offerings expanded during the 2000s: the High Museum of Art doubled in size; the Alliance Theatre won a Tony Award; and numerous art galleries were established on the once-industrial Westside.

Atlanta is also experiencing the national trend of young people moving back into cities. Metro Atlanta is also one of the fastest-growing areas in the country in terms of both population and job growth and expected to grow by another 3 million between now and 2040. That makes intown areas attractive for those working intown, and much land is still available in some neighborhoods. In 2019, Atlanta was named the fourth fastest gentrifying city in the United States.

Since 2010, corporate investors have served as a major catalyst for gentrification in Atlanta. Atlanta has one of the most appealing real estate markets in the nation which attracts corporate investors from around the world. Over 40% of single-family homes in the Atlanta area were bought by corporate investors in third quarter 2021. Atlanta's mayor, Andre Dickens, proposed regulations in an attempt to limit the number of homes corporate investors can buy because their buying power could put the average resident at a disadvantage in negotiating to own property. Also Mayor Dickens committed to adding and maintaining at least 20,000 affordable housing units by 2026.

In 2022, Atlanta metro area homes were declared unaffordable for the average buyer by the Federal Reserve Bank. The 2022 median home price in the Atlanta metro area was $350,000 and the median resident annual household income was $73,000 which means becoming a home owner may be challenging for a large percentage of the population. Since the revitalization boom, African-Americans have been the fastest declining demographic within Atlanta's city limits but the fastest growing in most of Atlanta's surrounding suburbs. Decent standard homes selling for under $250,000 inside the Perimeter were in abundance in 2012 but have become a less common occurrence as of 2022. The average monthly rent for a one-bedroom apartment in Atlanta went up from $799 in 2012 to $1,710 in 2022 which resulted in some renters leaving the city seeking a more affordable cost of living. And despite efforts by majority of the Atlanta City Council in 2022, Atlanta landlords are not required to accept Section 8 housing vouchers due to overruling state laws that protect the right of choice for landlords. Gentrification, the housing shortage, inflation, and a significant 65+ aged black population in many urban neighborhoods will likely continue to gradually increase housing costs and change demographics of the city, especially in neighborhoods in close proximity to downtown or the BeltLine. In 2022, Atlanta ranked only behind Phoenix for the highest inflation rate in the nation.

== Gentrification by area ==
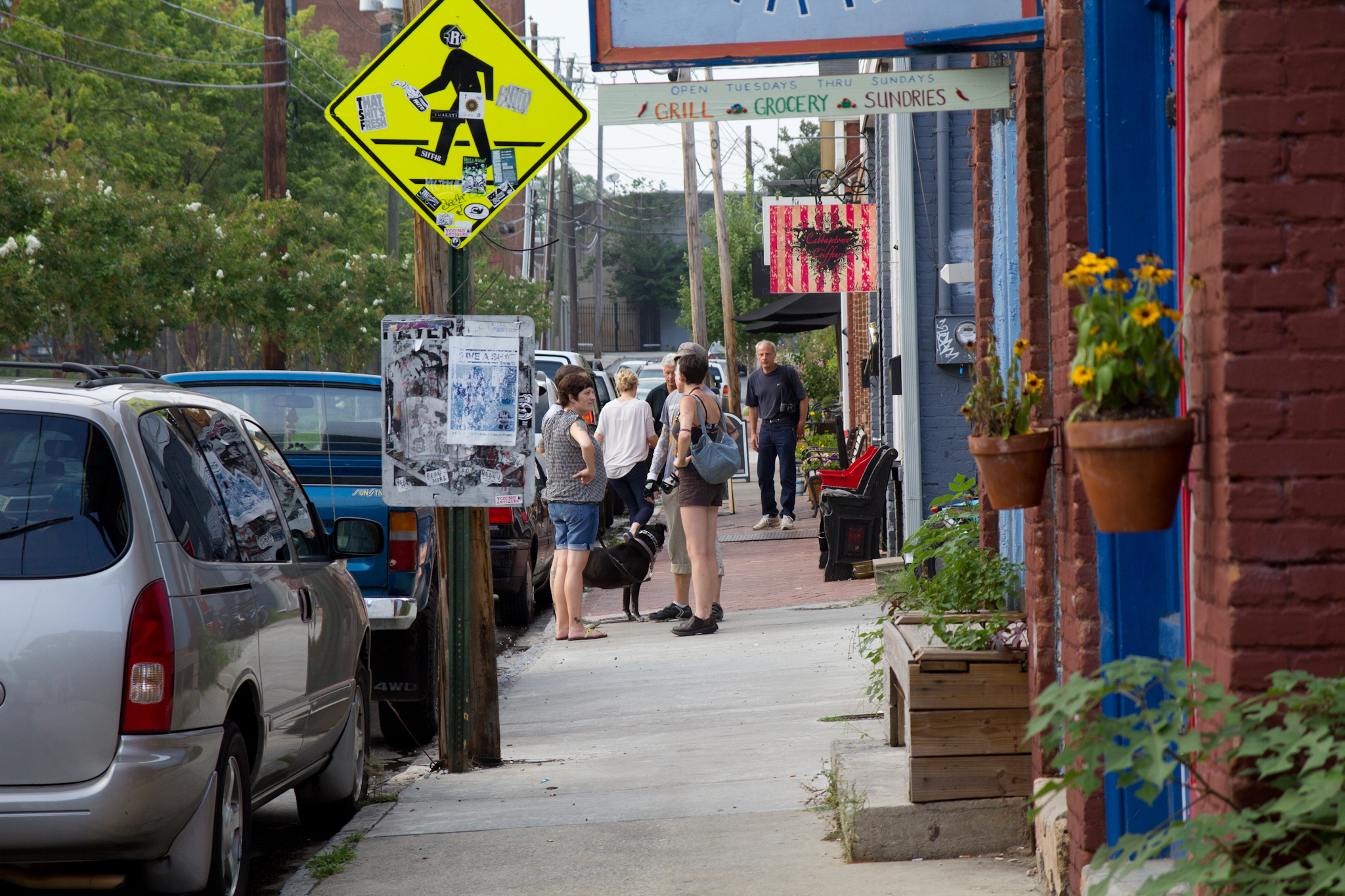
Street scene in Cabbagetown

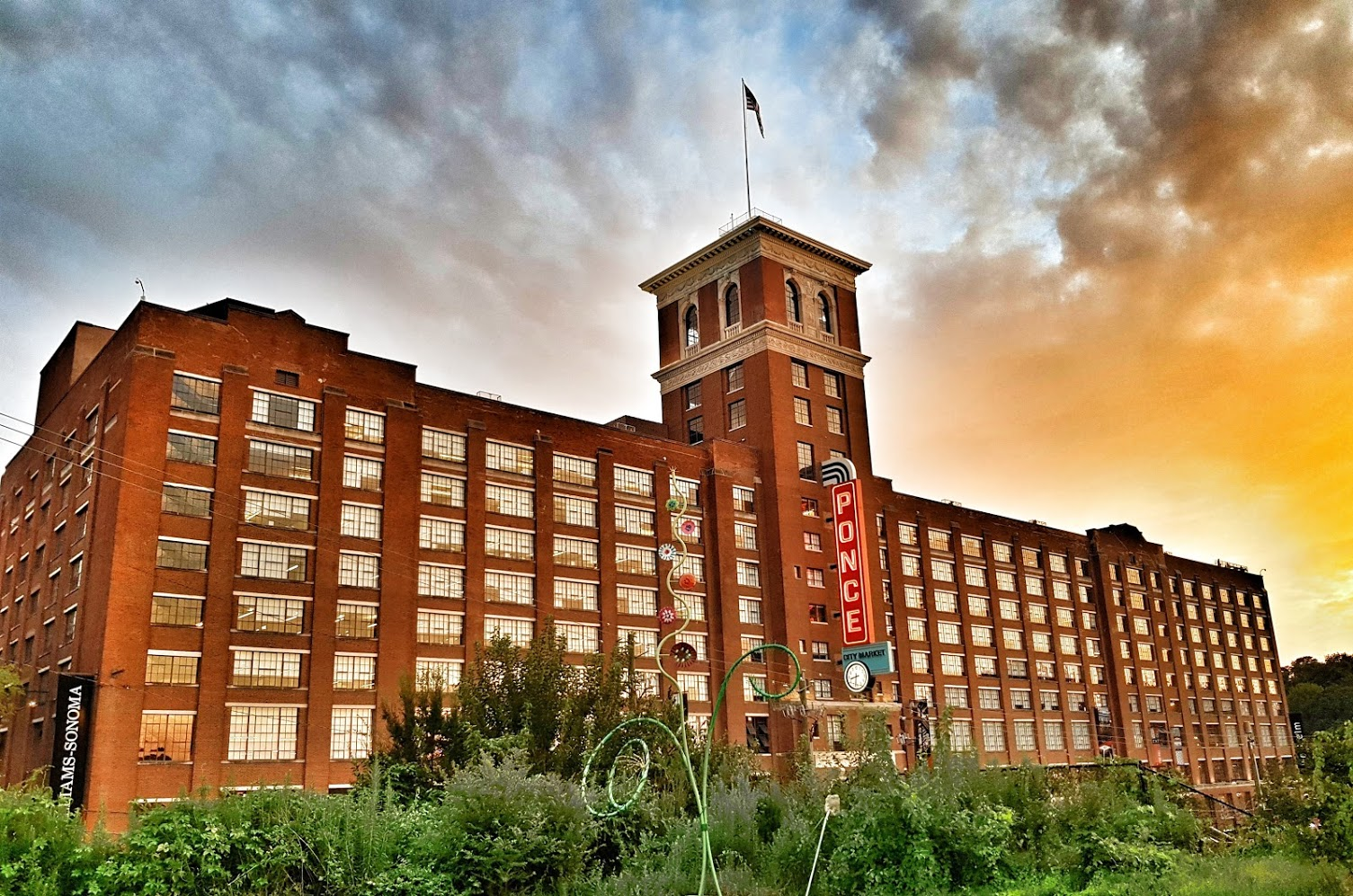
Ponce City Market, being repurposed for mixed use in Old Fourth Ward

=== Eastside Atlanta ===
Many of Atlanta's neighborhoods experienced massive white flight that affected other major American cities in the 20th century, causing the decline of once upper and upper-middle-class southeast Atlanta neighborhoods including Grant Park, Inman Park, Candler Park, Peoplestown and SummerHill. In the 1970s, after neighborhood opposition blocked two freeways from being built through the Southeast side, the area became the starting point for Atlanta's gentrification wave, first becoming affordable, hip but edgy neighborhoods attracting young people, and by 2000 having become relatively affluent areas attracting people from across Metro Atlanta to their upscale shops and restaurants. The city of Decatur has undergone gentrification since the 2010s and the city lost much of its black and LGBT population. Furthermore, the fact that the city has its own school district makes it harder for DeKalb County schools to bus into Decatur city-proper. Bungalow homes, which have been traditionally associated with the hood, have become high-priced and sought-after by yuppies who appreciate Decatur’s gay-friendly reputation.

Throughout the 1990s and 2000s, gentrification expanded into other parts of Atlanta, spreading throughout the historic streetcar suburbs east of Downtown and Midtown, areas with Black majorities historically such as the Old Fourth Ward, Kirkwood, Reynoldstown and Edgewood as well as Cabbagetown, once populated mostly by working-class whites with Appalachian origins. On the western side of the city, condos, apartments, and retail space were built into former warehouse spaces, transforming once-industrial West Midtown into a vibrant neighborhood full of residential lofts and a nexus of the arts, restaurants, and home furnishings..

The "poster child" for gentrification in Atlanta today is the Old Fourth Ward. Gentrification of the Ward began in the 1980s, and continued at a more rapid pace in the 21st century. New apartment and condo complexes with ground-floor retail sprung up, particularly along the BeltLine, Ponce de Leon Avenue, North Avenue, Highland Avenue and Boulevard. New and more diverse residents were attracted to the neighborhood due to its close proximity to Downtown, Midtown, Inman Park, Virginia-Highland and the airport, its urban vibe, its walkability, and its cultural offerings. By the 2010s, Old Fourth Ward had become one of the most dynamic and sought-after areas of the city, winning Creative Loafing's 2010 award for "Best Bet for Next Hot 'Hood".

=== Northwest Atlanta ===
The far Northwest Atlanta is experiencing major pressure from neighboring Cobb County, Buckhead and Cascade Heights, to invest more into the gentrification of the following neighborhoods Riverside, Bolton, and Whittier Mill Village. The inner parts of Northwest Atlanta such as Knight Park, Berkeley Park and Howell Mill are almost completely gentrified, whereas Bankhead, Rockdale and other neighborhoods in the Northwest have begun gentrification.

=== Southwest Atlanta ===
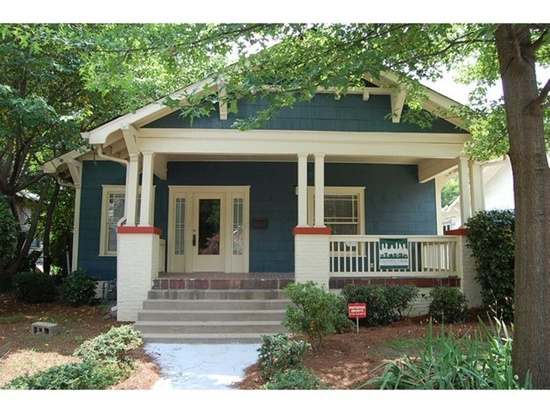
Historic home in Southwest Atlanta

Southwest Atlanta is the area between I-75 and I-20 along with the neighborhoods west of Summerhill. West End is the fastest gentrifying in the Southwest, with both downtown and the Hartsfield–Jackson Atlanta International Airport (Georgia's largest employer) putting pressure on this area. Southwest neighborhoods gentrifying at a high rate also include: Sylvan Hills, Capitol View, Capitol View Manor, Mechanicsville, Pittsburgh, Cascade Heights, Westview, Venetian Hills, Oakland City and Adair Park. Gentrification in the west side of Atlanta differs than most neighborhoods in the more expensive east in that there is a larger number of higher income Black professionals and families helping gentrify the area. These neighborhoods had been majority-Black since white flight in the 1940s-1960s. They fell into steady decline, with Stewart Avenue becoming infamous for prostitution, crime and drugs. But by 2000, college-educated young white adults were buying homes in Southwest Atlanta in highly notable numbers, settling alongside many lifelong residents, attracted by intown status and the "charming affordable bungalows and community spirit". Higher interest by corporate investors to revitalize Southwest Atlanta soon followed, especially with the creation of the Beltline, revitalization of nearby downtown, and its proximity to the airport.

=== South Atlanta ===
South Atlanta is the part of Atlanta typically Southeast of I-75 and West of Moreland Avenue, South of Grant Park, including McDonough Blvd. Neighborhoods include: South Atlanta, Lakewood Heights, and High Point. These neighborhoods are showing early signs of gentrification with South Atlanta being the farthest along with some already unaffordable exclusive neighborhoods built along McDonough Blvd.

== Condemnation ==
Nathan McCall in his novel Them, describes the concerns of existing working-class black residents in the Old Fourth Ward in light of increasing numbers of more affluent white families moving into their historically Black neighborhood. The Atlanta Progressive News regularly runs stories expressing concerns about the displacement of existing residents and the lack of "affordable" housing as a result of gentrification. The gentrification of the city's neighborhoods has been the topic of social commentary, including The Atlanta Way, a documentary detailing the negative effects gentrification has had on the city and its inhabitants.

== Displacement of existing residents ==
=== Factors ===
It is difficult to isolate one factor of gentrification, since they often feed others. A Georgia State student studied gentrification in the Pittsburgh neighborhood of Atlanta (between Adair Park and Peoplestown) and came up with the following causes of displacement generally lead to gentrification. Some additional information is available from the Annie E. Casey foundation, again on Pittsburgh. Pittsburgh is a good neighborhood for studying gentrification because like much of NPU-V, it is ground zero for what is expected to be the next wave with planners and researchers working hard to make sure displacement is not so rampant as in other parts of Atlanta.

- Increased costs to live in neighborhood.
  - Higher rents.
  - Increasing land values.
  - Higher taxes.
  - Investor flipping
- Decreased affordable housing inventory
  - Increasing numbers of vacant properties.
  - Redevelopment of affordable housing stock with less affordable and infill development.
  - Condemnation
- Uneven access to capital.
- Political displacement: Existing residents losing stake in clubs and organizations, causing some to move out.

=== Remediation of displacement ===
With the understanding that gentrification is a likely inevitable force for the beltline area: the Anne E. Casey Foundation along with land banks, churches, community leaders, and other organizations are working to ensure that neighborhoods in the Southwest do not experience the same level of community displacement as in the Eastern parts of Atlanta. This involves efforts such as acquiring vacant homes to revitalize them and move in stable working-class citizens with restrictions on future sale price, workforce training, tax stabilization, and education on property values to avoid homeowners selling to flippers.

== Positive impact of gentrification ==
Gentrification in Atlanta has improved or completely revitalized many neighborhoods that were dealing with high levels of crime, loitering, littering, squatters, inventory of abandoned homes, food deserts, lack of green spaces, low commercial investments, low neighborhood activism, low performing public schools, and stagnant or declining property values. Also, fast-growing tax revenue due to gentrification has greatly improved public city services such as the police department, fire department, sanitary department, parks, streets, cultural events, schools, and other services. For example, in 2023, Atlanta Public Schools (APS) was able to increase its budget up to $1.66 billion and its spend-per-student amount up to $22,692 which is about double the state and national public school average. In 2003, the APS spend-per-student amount was $13,290.

== See also ==
- Gentrification of Chicago
- Gentrification in Philadelphia
- Gentrification of Portland, Oregon
- Gentrification of San Francisco
- Gentrification of Vancouver
