= Gentrification of San Francisco =

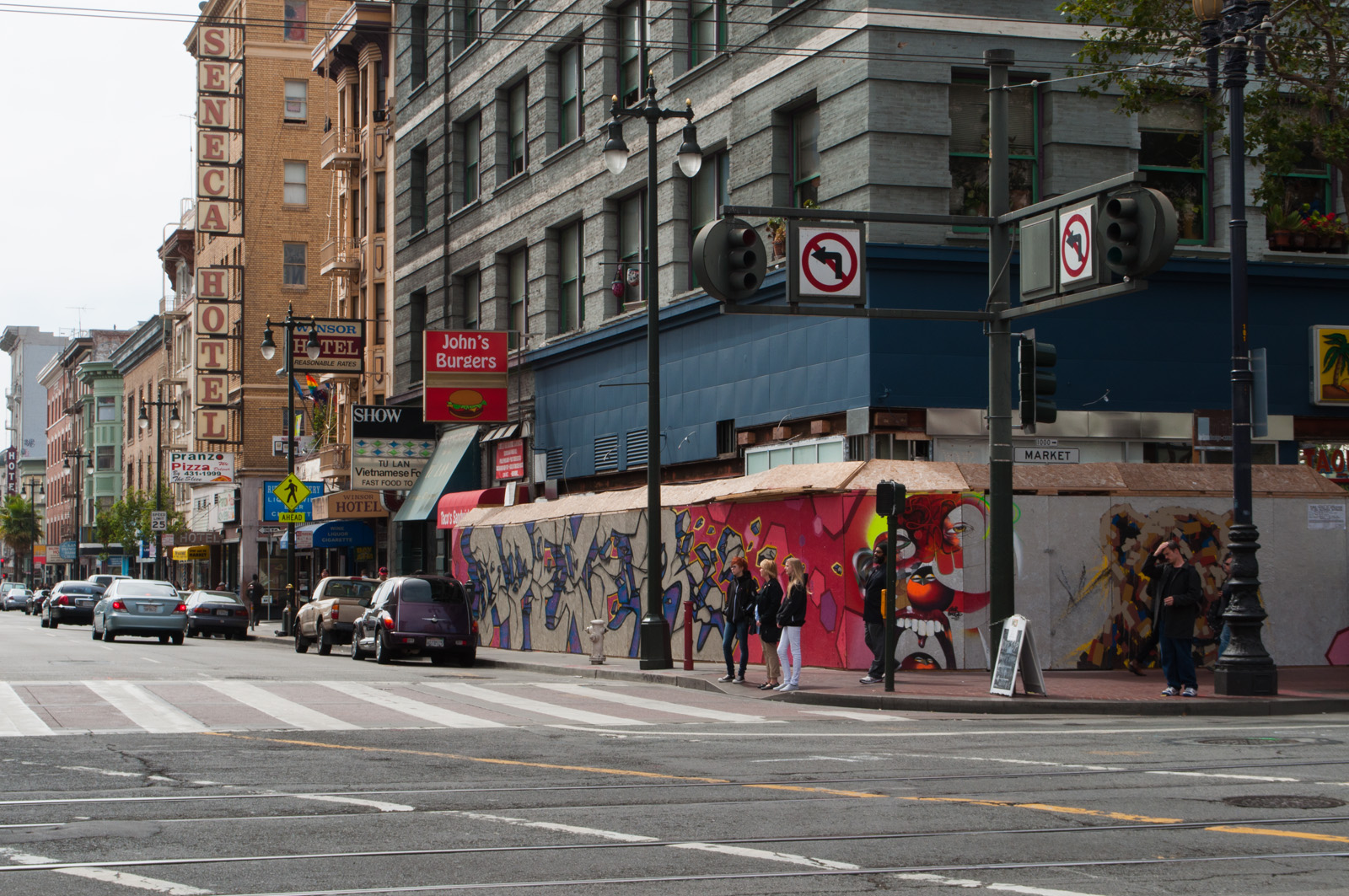
6th and Market, San Francisco

The gentrification of San Francisco has been an ongoing source of tension between renters and working people who live in the city as well as real estate interests. A result of this conflict has been an emerging antagonism between longtime working-class residents of the city and the influx of new tech workers. A major increase of gentrification in San Francisco has been attributed to the Dot-Com Boom in the 1990s, creating a strong demand for skilled tech workers from local startups and close by Silicon Valley businesses leading to rising standards of living. As a result, a large influx of new workers in the internet and technology sector began to contribute to the gentrification of historically poor immigrant neighborhoods such as the Mission District. During this time San Francisco began a transformation eventually culminating in it becoming the most expensive city to live in the United States.

== Causes ==
=== Technology firms and venture capital ===
Many locals in San Francisco attribute the negative effects of gentrification to the large number of technology companies in the surrounding metropolitan area. Private shuttle buses operated by companies such as Google have driven up rents in areas near their stops, leading to the San Francisco tech bus protests from locals in the area. It is clear to see that there is a strong connection between the technological sphere and the city as opposed to the city and the people that they are meant to serve; existing/current residents. However, this does not mean that big tech is to blame, as in most cases the goal of gentrification is to increase the wealth of a city. Therefore, the city will make connections or changes with whoever has the most wealth at a given time, which in this case happened to be big tech companies as the hope was to increase both job opportunities and the economic well-being of San Francisco.

=== Rent control ===
In 1994, San Francisco voters passed a ballot initiative which expanded the city's existing rent control laws to include small multi-unit apartments with four or less units, built prior to 1980. (about 30% of the city's rental housing stock at the time). In 2017, Stanford economics researcher Rebecca Diamond and others published a study which examined the effects of this specific rent control law on the rental units newly controlled compared to similar style units (multi-unit apartments with four or less units) not under rent control (built after 1980), as well as this law's effect on the total city rental stock, and on overall rent prices in the city, covering the years from 1995 to 2012.

They found that while San Francisco's rent control laws benefited tenants who had rent controlled units, it also resulted in landlords removing 30% of the units in the study from the rental market, (by conversion to condos or TICs) which led to a 15% citywide decrease in total rental units, and a 7% increase in citywide rents.

The authors stated that "This substitution toward owner occupied and high-end new construction rental housing likely fueled the gentrification of San Francisco, as these types of properties cater to higher income individuals."

The authors also noted that "...forcing landlords to provide insurance against rent increases leads to large losses to tenants. If society desires to provide social insurance against rent increases, it would be more desirable to offer this subsidy in the form of a government subsidy or tax credit. This would remove landlords’ incentives to decrease the housing supply and could provide households with the insurance they desire."

As of 2014, about 75% of all rental units in San Francisco are rent controlled.

== Impact ==
Rising prices, immigration, and the tech boom led to a cultural and demographic shift in the city.

=== Demographics ===
From 1990–2010, San Francisco gained 2,000 white residents, 32,000 Asian residents, and 13,000 Hispanic residents while the African American population decreased by 18,000 people. According to the American Community Survey, during this same period, an average of 60,000 people both migrated to San Francisco and migrated out. The people who left the city were more likely to have lower education levels, and have lower incomes than their counterparts who moved into the city. In addition, there was a net annual migration of 7,500 people age 35 or under, and net out-migration of over 5,000 for people 36 or over. For all of these demographic statistics, the rate of change has accelerated from 2005-2007 to 2010-2014. Migration and demographic patterns are continuing to rapidly shift in San Francisco.

=== Economics ===
From 2010 to 2014, the number of households making $100,000 or more saw an average growth rate of 17% while households making less than $100,000 saw an average growth rate of -3%. Of all multifamily rental units constructed from 2012–2014, 85% of new real estate construction in San Francisco has been luxury.

Many of the people living in San Francisco do not work in the city. Many more live in the suburbs and commute into San Francisco every day. High rents in Silicon Valley and other factors have contributed to a phenomenon where many tech workers choose not to live closer to work in Silicon Valley and instead stay in San Francisco. A survey conducted by the Bay Area Council and the Metropolitan Transportation Commission has found that 35 shuttle services operate a fleet of more than 800 buses that ferry 34,000 commuters every single day around the San Francisco Metropolitan Area. Of these shuttles, over 200 of them travel exclusively between San Francisco County and Santa Clara County.

=== Evictions ===
One major observed consequence to the Gentrification of San Francisco has been the rising number of eviction notices seen all throughout the city. Since 2009, the number of evictions has been increasing every single year in San Francisco and from 2014–2015 there were over 2,000 eviction notices filed with the rent board. This period represents a 54.7% increase in evictions over the five previous years. Houses in San Francisco, with a median listing price of $1,000,000, lead low and middle classes to conform the list of renters being therefore the most impacted by the escalating number of evictions.

== Community response ==
=== General background on Bay Area anti-gentrification movements. ===
In the broadest strokes of the matter, scholars have described anti-gentrification groups as all finding themselves more or less opposed to the Bay Area’s ‘mainstream liberal establishment.’ According to historian Nancy Mirabal, in the eyes of anti-gentrification leaders, San Francisco city officials exert the “collective belief… that gentrification, despite all of its potential drawbacks, was a positive… byproduct of growing Bay Area prosperity.”

In retaliation to the rapidly changing socioeconomic landscape of San Francisco, accelerated by the influx of high paying technology jobs, anti-eviction movements such as the San Francisco Tenants Union,Causa Justa :: Just Cause, Right to the City Alliance, and People Organizing to Demand Environmental and Economic Rights (PODER) have been created by the local community as a measure to hinder the effects of gentrification. Besides tenants' rights, social, economic, environmental and cultural public concerns have also been addressed by The Mission Anti-displacement Coalition (MAC), an organization created by PODER to counteract the effects of gentrification in the late 1990s due to the rise of tech jobs.

Opillard has written that while most of today’s local organizing came into being during the early successes of the dot-com boom, several of today’s most prominent anti-gentrification dissenters only began to gain currency in the wake of the Occupy movement.

Karl Beitel has written about how this traditionally progressive faction has monopolized the most visible levels of anti-gentrification discourse— showing up at city council meetings, maintaining large Twitter followings, and organizing frequent street protests. Still, more extremist anti-gentrification groups-- such as GAY SHAME and The Lucy Parsons Project-- have also had a large impact on the public art and street protests which have colored the Bay Area's anti-gentrification movement in recent years.

=== Politics ===
The top five leading justifications for evictions are:

1. Breach of lease - Under the Rent Ordinance tenants may be evicted for violating any terms of their signed lease agreement.
2. Nuisance - Tenants who regularly disrupt "the comfort, safety or enjoyment of the landlord or tenants in the building" are subject to eviction.
3. Owner Move In - Landlords are entitled to a unit in their complexes for them or an immediate relative to use as their residence
4. Ellis Act - The California law permits evicting all tenants if the owner intends to stop renting.
5. Illegal Use - An eviction method used to get rid of tenants engaged in illegal activities. This justification is now used to evict tenants from "illegal" units that exist because a landlord failed to get permits.

Relative to all evictions, evictions with the five justifications above increased by 82.5% over the same five-year period. These movements have also focused on mitigating evictions from "no-fault" evictions such as those caused by the Ellis Act. In November 2014 a ballot measure was put forward which would put a tax on real estate speculation. Proposition G led to a virtual halt of Ellis Act evictions in the months leading up to the election. After the proposition was narrowly defeated, the number of evictions from the Ellis Act more than doubled from 2014-2015.

San Francisco-based technology companies such as Airbnb are actively involved in city politics to advance their interests in the city. In response to Airbnb's impact on the housing market in San Francisco, housing activists have called for restrictions on the company's listing practices to limit the number of short-term rentals in the city. Airbnb spent more than $8 million to defeat a single proposition in San Francisco that would restrict the number of rentals in San Francisco. In September 2016, Airbnb began the process to sue the City of San Francisco to retaliate against new regulations.

== By neighborhood ==
As the fourth most populous city in California, and the 13th-most populous in the United States, with a 2016 census-estimated population of 870,887, San Francisco has multiple neighborhoods that experienced gentrification during different time periods. Below are a few of the areas that have been most gentrified in San Francisco.

=== Chinatown ===
Chinatown is an area in which many immigrants and small business owners reside and have been subject to mass gentrification. Due to the free landscape and convenient location of Chinatown, large businesses are attracted to the area and many small businesses in the area have been unable to make ends meet as a result. There have been multiple attempts through policy initiatives to try to preserve cultural value in Chinatown and slow down gentrification. The Chinatown Resource Center made an attempt to prevent developers who want to purchase land in Chinatown to create offices; however, 1,700 previously occupied residential units were still converted into office space. As a response, the Chinatown Resource Center created a proposal to make structural changes in land use policy to decrease or slow "revitalization." Furthermore, Chinatown Core's Planning department created the 1986 Rezoning Plan, which prohibited demolition and converting residential buildings in Chinatown Core for alternative needs. However, all other parts of Chinatown, such as the Chinatown North and Polk Gulch were not protected by this plan (only Chinatown Core was). Thus, many Asian communities in non-Chinatown Core areas suffered from threats of buyouts and eviction. For example, the number of Asian residents in Chinatown's Polk Gulch neighborhood decreased from 3,519 to 2,527 from 1980 to 2013. In addition, the majority of these Asian residents were replaced by white residents. Though policy initiatives have slowed down gentrification in Chinatown, it has not prevented it.

==== Resistance to gentrification in Chinatown ====
Both Asian American Chinatown residents and Asian American individuals who don't live in Chinatown have protested gentrification in the Chinatown area in order to preserve the culture and history of the space.

=== Mission District ===
Mission District is heavily populated with Latino communities and has historically been subject to gentrification from growth and expansion of technology. For example, the cost of living and rent prices in the Mission District increased in the late 1990s after the Dot-com bubble boom. The Mission District was chosen as a place for many higher-income, white tech workers to reside because of the culture of the Mission District, the high density of the neighborhood and the multiple forms of transportation infrastructures available in the area to the Financial District and Silicon Valley. Along with an increase in rent prices, the value of the Northeast Mission Industrial Zone (NEMIZ) decreased and was replaced by tech-based work. The dot-com boom is also known as the Mission District's first wave of gentrification. After the dot-com bubble burst, the Mission District experienced less gentrification during the period of economic recovery, however, it remained an area with an increasing influx of high-income, tech workers. Since 1980, the Latino population in the Mission District decreased from 44% to 38% in 2013. This was coupled with an increase in the population of white residents in the Mission District from 36% in 1980 to 43% in 2013. Furthermore, the number of residents in the Mission District without a high school diploma decreased from 41% in 1980 to 17% in 2003, while the number of residents in the Mission District with a four-year college degree increased from 18% in 1980 to 52% in 2003.

==== Resistance to gentrification in the Mission District ====
San Francisco's Mission District has historically been a working-class area. From the early 1960s onward the Mission has been predominantly populated by working and low-income people whose first language is Spanish, many of them recent immigrants. The dot-com boom of the mid to late 1990s saw an intense acceleration of Mission gentrification. Residents of the Mission who have felt threatened by gentrification responded in various ways. A notorious example of resistance was the 'Mission Yuppie Eradication Project,' an anti-capitalist direct action group which advocated and committed acts of vandalism and sabotage of expensive vehicles, luxury housing, and bars and dining establishments catering to wealthy newcomers. The MYEP aimed at defining gentrification in terms of irreconcilable conflict between classes and elicited a considerable amount of media coverage.

Mission gentrification has also triggered responses from a variety of organizations, movements and artistic expressions. Street art can be seen on roads and alley-ways in the Mission District describing the negative effects of gentrification. For example, street art on the corner of 19th and San Carlos depicting ten sea turtles says: "Latino Art Only," indicating discontent from gentrification as well as from the influx of white folks in what has been a primarily Latino neighborhood. The Mission District is also the heart of San Francisco's protests. The San Francisco tech bus protests occurred in the Mission District, to fight against gentrification and displacement caused by the tech boom, as well as rising prices of rental housing. However, Latino families continued to be displaced despite all of the protesting and other efforts to keep them from having to leave.

== Gentrification of the Greater Bay Area Region ==
Silicon Valley's technological rise has also led to gentrification of the broader Bay Area. This includes East Palo Alto, where Hispanic and African Americans have begun to move out in the face of rising costs. The flourishing of technology sector at Silicon Valley and rapid recovery from the Great Recession have caused for the job market to skyrocket for popular professions, while others decline. Burlingame, Mountain View, San Jose, and Santa Clara are also affected by Silicon Valley's growth, as the region has no defined bounds and continues to proliferate along the central coast.

African Americans comprised almost half of homeowners and renters in North Oakland in the 1990s, yet by 2011, this number has dropped by almost 30%. Even though African Americans represent a significant demographic minority in East Bay cities, they are more likely to be displaced and gentrified due to low socioeconomic status and less financial wealth. In fact, there is a strong correlation between gentrification and the susceptibility of people of color being evicted and facing housing suppression. For instance, while West Oakland used to be the center for Black cultural life on an international scale in the late 1900s, only 28% of Oakland's citywide population identified as African American in the 2010 census.

=== Waves of gentrification in the Bay Area ===
First Wave (1950s-1990s): The First Wave of gentrification occurred during the period of blooming technology, and rapid modernization of the society. The discourse surfaced when San Francisco emerged as the center of technological development that gave rise to rapid job growth and transformation of the housing market dynamics. Communities of color in the Bay Area began to see the arrival of new millionaires, which gave landowners opportunities to engage in the process of evictions and drastically increase in rent. Numerous reports state that during this period of time, the number of faultless evictions in Oakland tripled while rent increased more than 100 percent.

Second wave (2000- 2015): The transition of housing market dynamics in the Bay Area then did not just create housing crisis, but an intensification of gentrification also known as the second wave. This period is characterized by a drastic increased in borrowing predatory loans by residents in order to combat the effects of gentrification. However, many of the loans offered did not include income verifiability so many homes were foreclosed, affecting thousand homeowners and tenants living in the Bay Area.

Third wave (2015- current): The third wave of gentrification is often due to a change in the economic culture and the status quo at a given time. Meaning that the next big thing that will attract wealth will dictate the change that we witness in a certain area or neighborhood. Often those who do not fit within the new changes will be forcefully displaced and left to fend for themselves, and often these are low-income residents who have resided in the neighborhood for decades. This is specifically what occurred in San Francisco during its third wave of gentrification, as it took a great interest in increasing the city's wealth and revenue by making the city more appealing to tourists and investors. The Bay Area is now currently facing a new wave of gentrification caused by the expansion of technology industry and investment of private business developers. New businesses open everywhere to replace long-term communities, and causes the constant migration of tenants all over the Bay Area. This period is marked by the heightened eviction, displacement rates that contribute to the growing inequity and exacerbated poverty rates. The overall goal appears to be a hastily attempt to pursue the economic advancement of the city, while the displacement of original or low-income residents is left on the back-burner, which will be dealt with at a later time.

== See also ==
- Gentrification in Philadelphia
- Gentrification of Atlanta
- Gentrification of Chicago
- Gentrification of Portland, Oregon
- Gentrification of Vancouver
