= San Francisco tech bus protests =

Protests over private buses using public stops

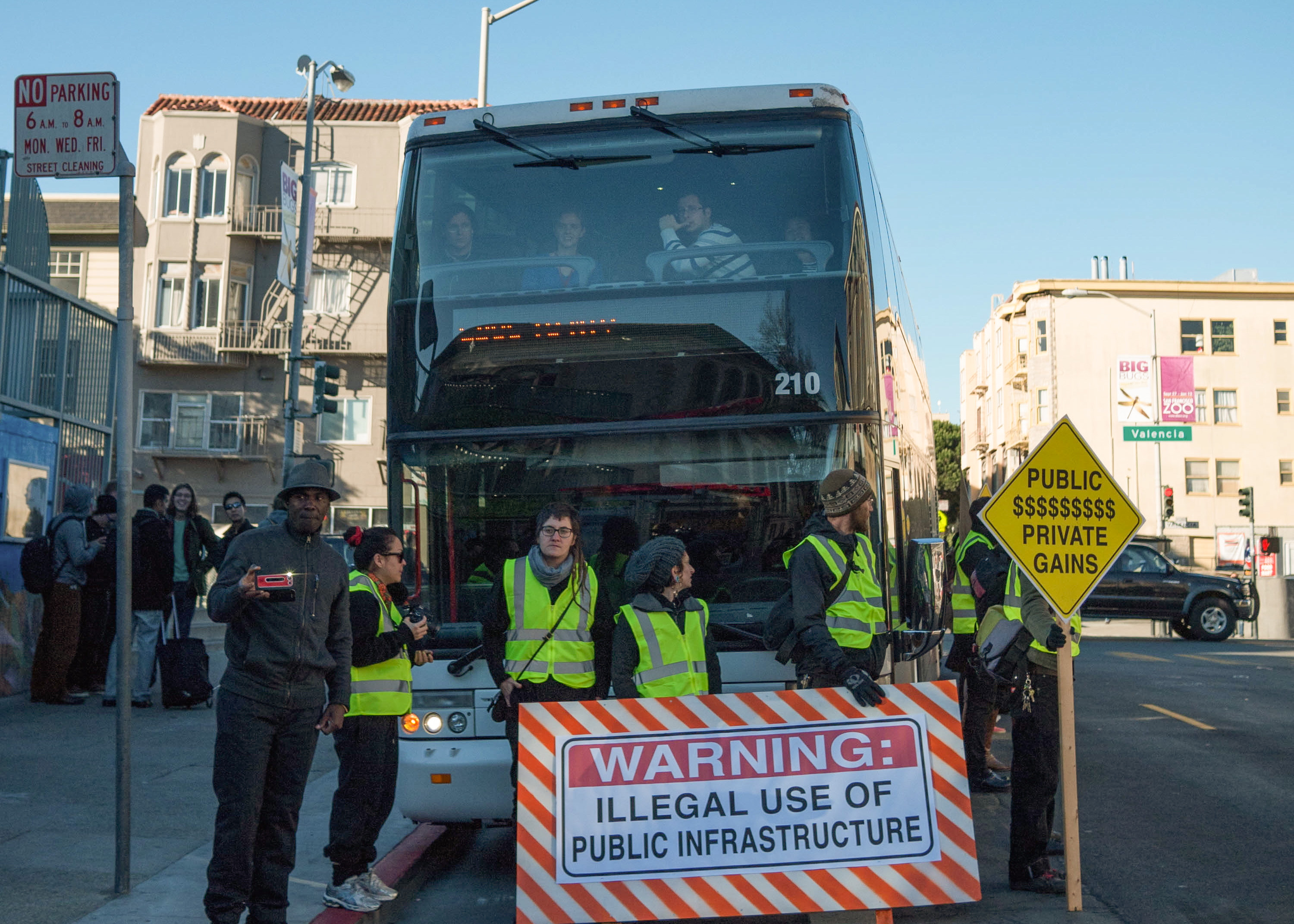
- Protesters in San Francisco obstruct a bus carrying tech workers on December 9, 2013
- Date: December 2013 – February 2016
- Location: San Francisco & Oakland, California, US
- Caused by: Direct cause Private transportation services operating parallel to municipal services Indirect cause Gentrification / Displacement
- Methods: Direct action; Occupation; Picketing; Demonstrations; Street protest; Petitions
- Result: Commuter Shuttle Program since February 1, 2016

Parties
| City of San Francisco: • San Francisco Board of Supervisors; • San Francisco Municipal Transportation Agency (SFMTA); Silicon Valley tech companies: • Google; • Apple, Inc.; • Facebook; • Genentech; • Yahoo | Community activists: • San Francisco League of Young Voters; • Harvey Milk Lesbian, Gay, Bisexual, Transgender Democratic Club; • Heart of the City; • San Francisco Displacement and Neighborhood Impact Agency; • Eviction Free San Francisco; Labor unions; • SEIU 1021 |

The San Francisco tech bus protests, also known as the Google bus protests, were a series of protests in the San Francisco Bay Area beginning in late 2013, when the use of shuttle buses employed by local area tech companies became widely publicized. The tech buses have been called "Google buses" although other companies—such as tech companies Apple, Facebook, and Yahoo, and biotechnology corporation Genentech—also pay for private shuttle services.

The buses are used to transport employees from their homes in San Francisco and Oakland to corporate campuses in Silicon Valley, about 40 miles (64 km) south. Anti-tech bus protesters viewed the buses as symbols of gentrification and displacement in a city where rapid growth in the tech sector and insufficient new housing construction has led to increasing rent and housing prices.

In reaction to the protests, the City of San Francisco began provisional regulation of the shuttle services in August 2014, with some of the shuttle stops being closed or reassigned to other locations within the city. A permanent solution, known as the Commuter Shuttle Program, took effect on February 1, 2016. This subjected the shuttle services to regulatory processes and monetary compensation requirements, imparting greater legitimacy upon their use. Owing to these new regulations, by May 2017 the protests had largely abated.

== Background ==
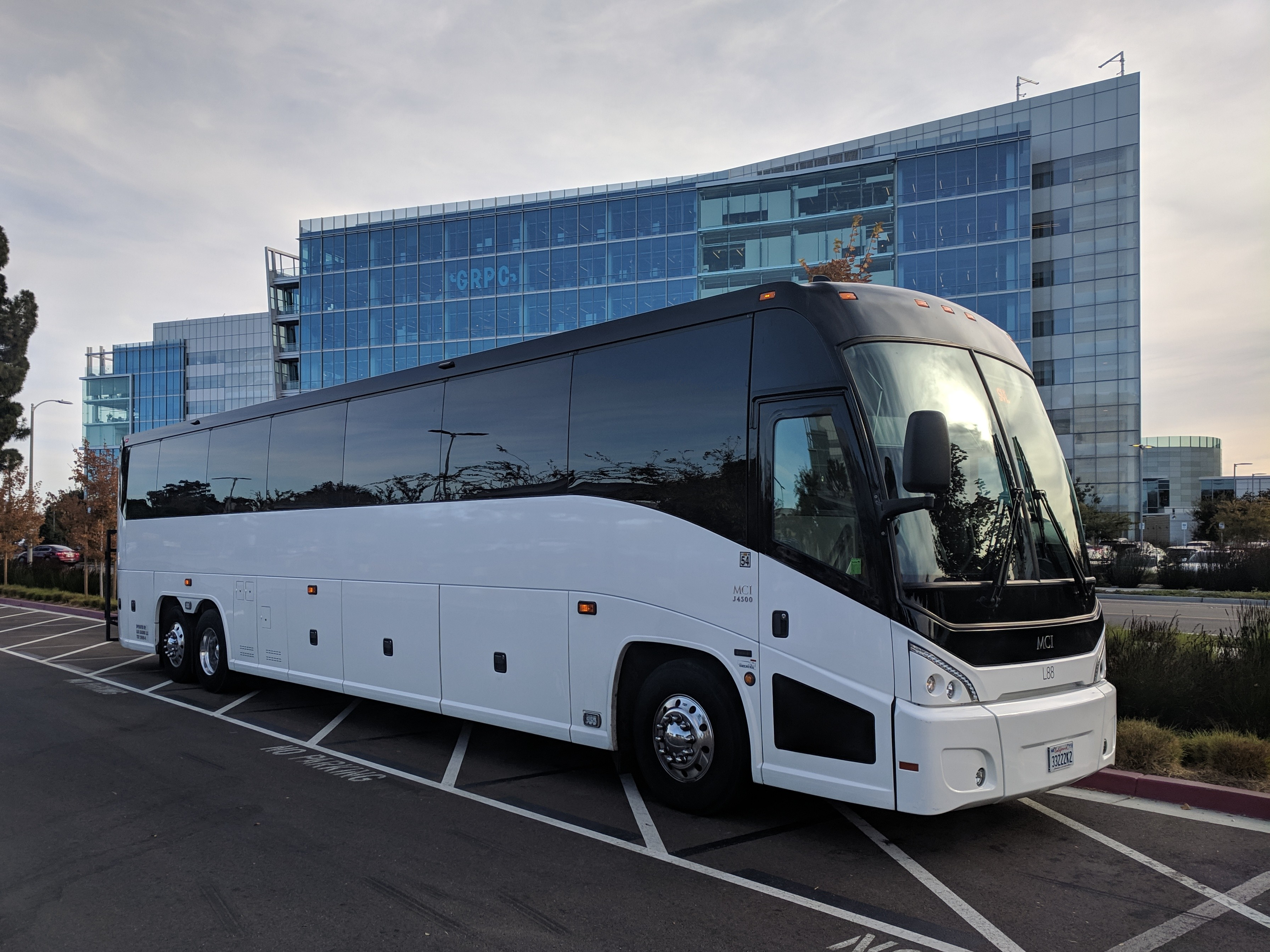
A Google bus parked near Google's office buildings in Sunnyvale.

The core issues surrounding the use of buses were that only employees of tech companies were allowed to use them, and for a substantial amount of time the buses used city infrastructure without compensating the city for their use. According to Berkeley professor Abigail De Kosnik, the resulting protests can be viewed as "synecdoches for the anger that many San Francisco residents feel towards technological privilege and its facilitation of a widening of a class divide in the city", and that the Google bus protests were "attempts to disrupt the smoothness of technological privilege's spread."

=== Transportation needs ===
Growth in the technology sector of Silicon Valley at the beginning of the 21st century encouraged an influx of tech workers to the area, increasing demand for public transportation in the greater Bay Area. Inadequate links between San Francisco and Silicon Valley workplaces became a leading factor in Silicon Valley employers' 2008 implementation of tech buses as viable alternatives for transportation. As a net gain, busing ensured employees had a convenient way to commute to work while allowing for tech workers to live outside of Silicon Valley. According to a 2012 report by the San Francisco Municipal Transportation Agency (SFMTA), there were approximately 6,500 tech commuters who used shuttle buses to take them from their respective homes to work locations outside the city.

=== Gentrification ===
At the same time, the growth of the technology companies caused gentrification. Rents were rising and evictions were increasing in frequency by late 2013. The use of exclusive busing services, along with the suburban locations of tech companies, served to isolate tech workers from other San Francisco residents in a manner similar to gated communities. One commentator remarked:

The buses roll up to San Francisco's bus stops in the morning and evening, but they are unmarked, or nearly so, and not for the public. Most of them are gleaming white, with dark-tinted windows, like limousines, and some days I think of them as the spaceships on which our alien overlords have landed to rule over us. Sometimes the Google Bus just seems like one face of Janus-headed capitalism, in that they contain the people too valuable even to use public transport or drive themselves.

=== Dueling transportation systems ===
Concerns soon arose over the busing, most notably the shuttles' use of public bus stops. Having different transport systems attempting to use the same areas at each stop in an uncoordinated fashion brought about unnecessary traffic congestion, for which the City of San Francisco was not compensated. An internal city report stated:

Prior to August 2014, San Francisco did not regulate or collect fees from commuter shuttles. Shuttles operated throughout the City on both large arterial and small non-arterial streets. Shuttles loaded and unloaded passengers in a variety of places whether it was legal or not, including white loading zones, red Muni zones, and other vacant curb spaces. When curb space was unavailable, shuttles often would load or unload passengers in the travel lane. The lack of rules for where and when loading and unloading were permitted resulted in confusion for shuttle operators and neighbors, inconsistent enforcement, and real and perceived conflicts with other transportation modes.

== Protests ==
The protests started on December 9, 2013, when activists from a group called Heart of the City blocked and entered a double-decker bus used by Google at 24th Street and Valencia in San Francisco's Mission District. The main strategy used during the protests was to briefly detain buses while engaged at their stops loading passengers. Afterwards, messages by the protesting groups were disseminated through media, communicating their actions to larger audiences outside the city. This sparked other groups across the Bay in Oakland and out of state in Seattle to protest private tech commuter buses in their areas. In the majority of incidents, protesters merely blocked the buses from leaving their stops. At a protest organized by Eviction Free San Francisco on December 20, 2013, a group of protesters blocked a bus while an organizer using a loudspeaker from the back of a truck drew attention to the blockade, which lasted 30 minutes.

On April 1, 2014, April Fools' Day, protesters wearing blue, yellow and red costumes blocked a tech bus carrying Google workers at 24th and Valencia, preventing it from departing. An organizer named "Judith Hart" — claiming to be the president of Google's new Gmuni division – began answering questions on a loudspeaker from the gathering crowd of onlookers while distributing Gmuni passes, which she claimed allowed the public to ride the tech buses for free. After several people from the crowd were denied boarding, the organizer acknowledged to arriving police that the bus driver "may not have received notice of the program" and the bus was ultimately allowed to depart.

Across the bay in Oakland, protesters were more pointed in their blockade, with one protester breaking the window of a bus while an unrelated second protester slashed the tire of another bus. Other protesters detaining a bus in Oakland unfurled a banner containing expletives. In one incident on April 2, 2014, a protester climbed to the roof of a Yahoo bus close by Bay Area Rapid Transit's MacArthur station in Oakland, and vomited on the windshield. According to an organizer from San Francisco, the protests in Oakland were not affiliated with the San Francisco groups, with "the only real connection is that most of our communities are being heavily displaced and people are very angry".

== Reactions ==
=== Law enforcement ===
In almost all incidents, the protesters who were obstructing buses eventually moved of their own accord or at police direction. Very few incidents of arrests were made during the protests, due largely to so-called Graham factors, whereby use of the police power to arrest is considered inexpedient in cases where people are viewed as peacefully protesting. In these cases, San Francisco Police Department officers are trained to de-escalate the situation by using other, non-confrontational means, such as communicating with non-compliant subjects.

=== SF Board of Supervisors ===
With the accumulation of media and public interest that the protests garnered, the San Francisco Board of Supervisors held their first three-hour meeting on the protests at City Hall on January 7, 2014. Tech bus operators had been offered a solution whereby they would be charged $1 per stop per day, regardless of how many workers got on or off. Angry residents, citing the $2 fee (Note: At the time of this meeting on January 7, 2014, regular cash bus fare was $2.00. As of July 1, 2019, regular cash bus fare was $3.00.) San Franciscans had to pay to board city buses, demanded that the private bus services pay more for their share. In the meantime, the San Francisco Municipal Transportation Agency was asked by the Board of Supervisors to commission a panel to begin gathering information on a long-term solution. Six months later, in July 2014, SFMTA began implementing its first preliminary fee of $1.00 for each public stop used by the buses, which was expected to raise $1.5 million during the 18 months that it was to be in effect.

=== Tech companies ===
In February 2014, Google donated $6.8 million to SFMTA to provide free public transit for low-income children in San Francisco. On March 31, 2014, tech-advocacy group sf.citi—led by Ron Conway, angel investor in Google and other tech companies—released a statement of support for SFMTA's pilot program.

== Resolution ==
In 2015 SFMTA released the results of its fact-finding pilot program, which found that about 47% of workers in tech areas would commute to and from work using their own vehicles if they did not have the tech buses available to them, increasing the amount of privately owned vehicles on area roadways. This led SFMTA's board of directors to approve a broader solution, thereafter known as the Commuter Shuttle Program. The program allowed the city to regulate the buses by delineating where they could travel to, their size, and how much each bus was to pay the city as compensation for their usage of city bus stops. Sporadic protesting continued until February 2016, when SFMTA approved an extension to the program, allowing it to continue beyond its initial end date of March 31, 2017. This extension carried tighter regulations of the buses, including limits to larger buses, final approval on all main roads to be used, and city provided safety training for the drivers. Stricter coordination would also be made through continuous GPS tracking of the buses. Finally, the extension made permanent the city's ability to collect their per-stop fee, which as of October 2018 stood at $7.65 per stop.
