= Gentrification of Chicago =

Gentrification in Chicago has been an issue between the residents of minority neighborhoods who believe the influx of new residents destabilizes their communities, and the gentrifiers who see it as a process that economically improves a neighborhood. Gentrification is the process of altering the demographic and socioeconomic composition of a neighborhood usually by decreasing the percentage of low-income minority residents and increasing the percentage higher-income residents,

Researchers have debated the significance of its effects on the neighborhoods and whether or not it leads to the displacement of residents. There are some researchers who claim that the loss of affordable housing mainly impacts the poorer minority residents and causes them to have to move out of their neighborhoods which destabilizes their cultural communities. However, critics say that since gentrification often excludes highly black neighborhoods, those residents are prevented from benefiting from any of the positive effects such as redevelopment and neighborhood investment. Factors associated with and used to measure gentrification in Chicago are changes in the number of residents with bachelor's degrees, median household income, racial composition, visual observations, and the presence of coffee shops.

Historically, the emergence of urban black and Latino neighborhoods in Chicago during the 1950s through the 1970s were made possible because of the waves of white residents moving out into more suburban neighborhoods. There have been phases of gentrification in Chicago of various neighborhoods, some of which were in 1990s and in 2007–2009. Gentrification debates in Chicago have been mostly focused around the gentrification of Chicago's historically Latino or black neighborhoods. Generally, these neighborhoods are located near the central urban downtown areas and along the east side of the city.

== Gentrification debate ==
Generally, the two views held by researchers on gentrification are that it is a process which either negatively affects local residents and their community or that it is a process that positively affects the local economy and revitalizes a neighborhood. Some researchers claim that the negative effect of gentrification is that it leads to displacement of poorer residents by wealthier residents. They argue that the increase in property values and rents forces poor residents out of the neighborhood. However, other researchers claim that the revitalization and increased economic growth of a neighborhood outweigh the adverse effects. Proponents of gentrification also claim that the displacement is actually a sign that people are moving because they freely choose to. However, Boyd (2008) and Perez (2002) state in their studies that current residents of the gentrified neighborhood feel threatened by the arrival of residents of races other than their own.

In 2015 Governing published an article on their website in which they calculated Chicago's gentrification rate at 16.8%. The article also counted gentrification happening in 51 tracks within Chicago. Another study calculated Chicago's probability of gentrification at 26.2% by taking into account immigration rates into the city. Overall, the data suggests that gentrification of Chicago is happening in relatively few neighborhoods. Some critics of anti-gentrification propose that gentrification is not major issue for low-income communities because it is a localized process that is rare and typically does not affect displacement rates. There is evidence in the research to support these critics claims that gentrification does harm nearby neighborhoods that were not gentrified because they miss out on investment opportunities.

Hwang and Sampson's (2014) claimed in their study that positive effects of gentrification associated with urban renewal did not come to benefit poorer black minority neighborhoods because it led to more disinvestment. Because of the ethnographic trends associated with gentrification, for example one study found that communities that are 90% black are less likely to be gentrified, and these neighborhoods are unable to benefit from urban renewal or investment. Those in favor of gentrification view it as a process that can help increase proportion of middle class residents in a neighborhood.

=== Types of gentrification ===
Sociologist and other researchers at times specify the specific type of gentrification by using terms such as: white gentrification, black gentrification, or Latino gentrification. The agents of gentrification can be wealthier white residents moving in as well as wealthier black and Hispanic residents. Researchers have noted that different gentrifiers affect the ways in which local communities react to gentrification and how they see the invasion of space.

==== Environmental gentrification ====
Environmental gentrification (also referred to as 'ecological gentrification' or 'green gentrification') refers to the phenomenon in which property values increase based on the cleaning up of previously polluted grounds and the implementation of public or green amenities to attract affluent white residents. These efforts are often marketed as "environmental sustainability" or "urban renewal" policies. In Chicago, environmental gentrification includes not only the creation of green spaces but also the inter-mixing of low-, middle-, and upper-class residents into mixed-income housing and schooling structures. While the intention may be to lessen segregation, the result can be heightened tension within a local community.

For environmental gentrification to occur, hazardous pollution conditions must already exist. In a study from 1993 to 2013, researchers identified hot spots and cold spots of elevated blood lead levels (EBLL) across Chicago's 77 community areas. Researchers found that most EBLL hot spots were located on the city's South and West Sides, while the cold spots were concentrated in the northern community areas. The presence of these EBLL hot- and cold spots correlated to the EBLL found in Chicago youth, with Fuller Park, located on the city's South Side, having the highest childhood EBLL rates in the city. Additionally, EBLL in Chicago youth has decreased from 1999 to 2013, though this new, decreased percentage reflects that of the U.S. national average in 2002.

Similar pollution patterns can be seen in the prevalence of brownfields in certain community areas. Brownfields, or unused properties with known or suspected environmental contamination, hinder potential land use initiatives. When cleaned and redeveloped, these fields can be used for housing, retail businesses, recreational areas or parks, or community buildings; thus, acquiring a No Further Remediation letter from the Illinois Environmental Protection Agency (IEPA) is needed to begin the process. Brownfield cleanup and remediation efforts are paid for either by the current landowner or by the new purchaser; costs are determined, in part, by the size of the brownfield. Researchers found that black residents' willingness to pay for cleanup or remediation efforts was less than that of their white counterparts. This disparity is likely the result of income inequality between both racial demographics.

Some researchers have identified the City of Chicago's (2000) Plan for Transformation of public housing (PFT) and (2004) Renaissance2010 (Ren2010) initiatives as the catalysts for a series of mixed-income strategies for poverty de-concentration, namely on the city's South Side. PFT, launched under the HOPE VI program, planned to rehab large public housing complexes, dispersing their low-income residents into smaller public housing units or privately owned rental properties. Ren2010 was marketed to residents as an attempt to reform failing Chicago Public Schools (CPS) and replace them with selective-enrollment charters, most of which were or are privately owned. Both initiatives led to the creation of new mixed-income communities and paved the way for residential or commercial developments in, and the subsequent gentrification of, affected neighborhoods.

===== Impact on residential mobility and movement =====
Through sustainable 'greening' efforts to clean up sites of pollution and the merging of mixed-income persons into shared residential spaces, environmental gentrification efforts bring low-income people of color and affluent white people into proximity. This can cause tensions among native and prospective residents, as the former experiences a "root shock," or a feeling of social or communal disorientation as a result of their displacement.

Colloquially referred to as 'The 606,' the Bloomingdale Trail is a green space amenity located on the city's Northwest side. In 2016, 46 interviews were conducted with residents of the four surrounding neighborhoods of the Bloomingdale Trail: Wicker Park & Bucktown and Logan Square & Humboldt Park. The residential dynamics between white, adult residents, and resident youth of color under the age of 26 were analyzed. In their interviews, the youth of color expressed that white residents' fear of them, as well as their subsequent labeling of youths of color's leisure activities as "deviant" was linked to white residents' hyperawareness of their minority status within the community. This awareness led to white residents going out of their way to avoid contact with the youth of color. These sentiments were echoed in the interviews with white residents, who frequently mentioned they were "scared" of the youth of color, and that, more specifically, their congregation in public spaces made them feel unsettled. This friction impacted the occurrence and prevalence of citizen-based policing, or the monitoring of a community done by residents who use the non-emergency, 3-1-1 line to report perceived problematic behavior to law enforcement. Youth of color reported that these efforts taken by their white neighbors made them feel alienated and un-welcomed in their own communities.

== Factors that impact gentrification ==
=== Factors that are positively associated with gentrification ===
Researchers study census records, surveys, and information derived from other public records like building permits filed with the city to understand the factors associated with gentrification. These factors will vary from city to city as well as their effects on gentrification. In Chicago, researchers have found several characteristics that were common among gentrified tracks such as the proximity to the city center, central business district, the ethnographic and racial composition, and the availability of older housing stock.

In the past, wealthier residents of a city have resided outside the city center, but in the past two decades there has been an influx of higher income residents to urban neighborhoods, which some researchers claim are agents of gentrification. Many gentrifiers are attracted to neighborhoods that a have relatively high minority composition, and researchers say that it is because the idea of living in a diverse neighborhood is appealing to gentrifiers. One study used GIS, addresses, and statistical analysis to determine that gentrifiers were also attracted to access to public transportation since there was an association between proximity to Chicago's "L" stations and neighborhoods that were gentrified.

=== Deterrents to gentrification ===
Researchers have noted that neighborhoods with higher concentrations of black residents and lower public perceptions have not been gentrified. One study concluded that if a neighborhood has a concentration of black residents higher than 40% then it was less likely to be gentrified, which was associated with less investment and resources for black residents. This "neighborhood selection" was connected by researchers as being a contributing factor increased inequality for urban blacks in Chicago. Proximity to interstates or highways was associated with a decreased likelihood that the neighborhood would gentrify because they are not heavily used by most typical gentrifiers.

== Impact on crime rates, schools, and housing ==
=== Crime rates and schools ===
Papachristos et al. (2011) related the number of coffee shops, a marker of gentrification, to the decrease in crime rates in neighborhoods in Chicago between 1991 and 2005. However, the study found that gentrification was associated with increased crime rates in black neighborhoods. Chaskin and Joseph's (2013) research provided another perspective on how residents perceive crime in that part of their perception is colored by behavior that is technically noncriminal, but deviates from their preferred social norms. With regard to schools, the current research does not indicate that schools are being negatively impacted.

=== Housing ===
Research has associated demolition of public housing and low income housing options with gentrification, and it has affected black residents in cities like Chicago. Some research specify that the problem occurs when developers and policy makers neglect to create affordable housing and focus their efforts on increasing property values and on building housing for new more affluent residents. There are efforts being made to integrate the local community in the gentrification process to minimize adverse effects for low-income minority residents, "positive gentrification". Still, others say that gentrification's lasting effects on communities lead to instability within neighborhoods, particularly Latino and black neighborhoods. While the city does offer Housing Choice Vouchers, Holloway's (2015) research provides evidence that suggests that these voucher programs have contributed to increased segregation of low-income black residents and not helped black residents move to redeveloped housing.

== History of gentrification of Chicago ==
Gentrification in Chicago can be traced back to at least the 1920s, when artists and other creatives moved into an area that became known as Old Town, part of the Near North Side and Lincoln Park neighborhoods. After World War II, the gentrification of Lincoln Park had begun in earnest. A community organization, the Lincoln Park Conservation Association, took the lead by attracting homeowners rather than renters and pushing to decrease residential density. The neighborhood's gentrification was encouraged in part by a city designation of Lincoln Park as a conservation district, spurring private investment and paving the way for urban renewal operations. Lincoln Park's gentrification, beginning near the lakefront in the 1950s and 1960s and later expanding into the rest of the neighborhood, was a catalyst for gentrification across the North Side of Chicago.

Each community area and neighborhood have a unique story regarding their current demographic composition and cultural narrative. Some neighborhoods began growing as Eastern European immigrant communities, which then evolved to consist of a different minority immigrant population. After whites left Chicago's urban neighborhoods in the 1950s, a process known as white flight, Latinos, blacks, and other minorities moved into urban neighborhoods and established their own communities. Their communities have faced challenges by the process of urban renewal and redevelopment. Developers built new homes in Lincoln Park and Old Town in the 1980s and by the 1990s other neighborhoods were also gentrified, such as Wicker Park and Humboldt Park. Helms (2003) described whites' relocation to neighborhoods closer to downtown as part of a "back-to-the-city" phenomenon as one of the driving forces behind the gentrification of urban neighborhoods in Chicago that has been happening throughout the 20th century and into the 21st century. Then because of Chicago's history of being a "hyper segregated" city (Massey and Denton 1993), many of its black neighborhoods are wary of outside interventions as they have in the past faced policies that perpetuate housing segregation and the disinvestment associated with it. Researchers characterize the gentrification in Chicago to have racial order undertones because of historic segregation practices against black, Hispanic, and other minority groups. The city government has begun to take an active role in creating neighborhood stability by preserving bungalow neighborhoods to help minimize the negative effects of gentrification beginning in 2000.

== Analysis by neighborhood ==
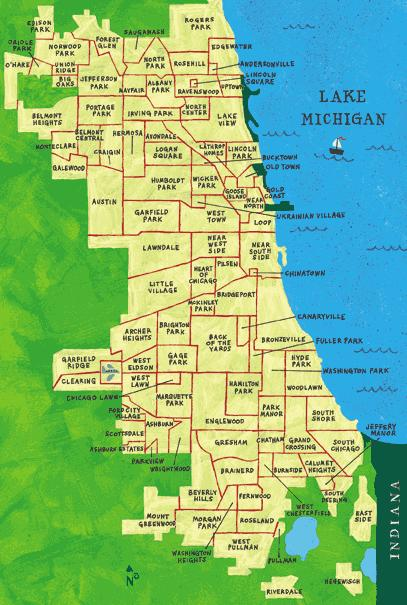
Map depicting Chicago's neighborhoods. Humboldt Park is located in the center of the city and Bronzeville within Douglas.

Chicago community areas map: Pilsen is located in Lower West Side, Bronzeville is located in South Side

=== Greater West Town and Humboldt Park ===
The official community area of Humboldt Park has one of the largest Puerto Rican-American communities in the United States and remains majority Hispanic (55.4%) as of 2020 with a significant Black population (33.1%). In the 1990s, the community areas to the east of Humboldt Park (West Town which includes the neighborhoods of Wicker Park and Ukrainian Village); and north of Humboldt Park (Logan Square which includes the neighborhood of Bucktown), underwent gentrification as reinvestment and housing upgrades increased property values in the 1990s. Researchers, Wilson and Grammenos (2005) described how real estate developers pitched development as a form of "benevolent gentrification" which would increase property values for local, usually poorer, homeowners; and some used a stereotyped version of the neighborhood as a dangerous ghetto in need of redevelopment. Many rebranded the neighborhoods to the east of Humboldt Park eschewing the broader name Humboldt Park for West Bucktown or Ukrainian Village in advertisements. Many Puerto Rican residents viewed redevelopment and gentrification as an incursion on their cultural identity via dilution.

Puerto Rican residents within the community have felt threatened by the changes in their neighborhood because they fear gentrification will destabilize their community and voiced their concerns. Individual Puerto Rican residents have led the effort to resist gentrification and promote strategies that in their eyes will protect their Puerto Rican community. For anti-gentrification activists change in their neighborhood is especially personal because they see it as detrimental to their cultural identity.

=== Bronzeville ===
Bronzeville is a historically black neighborhood located in the official community area of Douglas. It is predominantly composed of lower-income black and African-American residents and is an example site of black gentrification. Goetz (2010) published a study that supported the claim that gentrification led to the scarcity of public housing, which disproportionately affected residents that rely on the availability of public housing. According to Boyd (2008) gentrification has occurred due to city officials, incoming wealthier white and Asian residents, and black elites who have not made it their primary concern to maintain the availability of affordable housing and instead focused on upgrading the neighborhood.

Boyd's (2008) ethnographic study used the term defense development to describe how the South Side's black elites were attempting to maintain a sense of control within their community through public and economic policy as a result of feeling that gentrifiers were encroaching on their space and disrupting their community network. However, Boyd (2008) states that their efforts to limit the influence of outside gentrifiers has had the undesired effects of increasing the rate of gentrification overall and disproportionally affecting lower income residents.

=== Pilsen ===
The demographics of Pilsen located in the larger Lower West Side community area have changed from being composed primarily of residents of European ancestry to those of Latino ancestry in the 1960s. According to a study published in 2016 between the years of 2000-2013 Pilsen has been experiencing gentrification as coffee shops, artisan bakeries, and upscale restaurants open up on or near 18th Street. In 2000, Pilsen was 89% Hispanic, and by 2013 the neighborhood was 81.6% Hispanic. During that time, white residents increased from around 8% to around 12% of the total population. The increase of traffic from tourist and changes in the demographic composition has worried some local residents, while recognizing that the neighborhood has benefited from the economic growth.

Thalia Hall was purchased and renovated in 2013 for public use as a community and business center. Mexican-American residents were concerned with the new redevelopment and the influx of higher income residents into the neighborhood that would negatively impact their Hispanic cultural community.

=== Uptown ===
Originally settled as an exclusive commuter suburb turned resort area, the official community area of Uptown emerged as the leading retail and entertainment destination outside of The Loop in the 1920s and 1930s. During this time, a number of luxury apartment hotels, movie palaces, and other entertainment venues were built, such as the Aragon Ballroom, the Riviera Theater, and the Uptown Theatre. In the later half of the 20th century, it became a destination for immigrant communities. During the 1960s, Native American and southern Appalachian populations migrated to the area.

An early example of urban renewal, Harry S. Truman College, was built in the 1970s, displacing a significant number of primarily southern migrants. Later in the 1980s, Uptown became a destination for southeast Asian migrants, centering primarily around Argyle Street. Today, Argyle Street is still home to Chicago's 'Little Vietnam' district, though the southeast Asian population has been steadily decreasing over the past decade. As neighborhoods further south along the lakefront have become pricier, more and more higher income populations are starting to look to Uptown, with a number of SRO buildings and at least one hospital and an elementary school being converted into luxury apartments.

After the Broadway Bank Building was bought by developers, several of the non-profits housed there chose to relocate rather than stay in the neighborhood, citing the changing demographics of the neighborhood. The area has largely been re-branded as an entertainment district, anchored by many of the same venues that made it a destination a century ago. The largest, the Uptown Theatre, is currently in the early stages of being renovated. The impact the renovation will have on the neighborhood is unknown, but it is likely to speed up the investment in the surrounding area as low income individuals continue to be displaced.

Housing advocates have been extremely vocal about the loss of affordable housing in Uptown, staging demonstrations and protests outside remaining SROs, demanding the city take action and pushing for developers to add affordable units to the neighborhood, rather than paying for it elsewhere in the city.

== See also ==
- West Argyle Street Historic District
- Gentrification of Atlanta
- Gentrification of Portland, Oregon
- Gentrification of San Francisco
- Gentrification of Vancouver
