= Gentrification in Philadelphia =

Gentrification is the controversial process of affluent people moving into a historically low-income neighborhood. It is often criticized because the current residents have limited options to buy or rent equivalent housing in alternative areas at the same price. If they stay, prices for products, services, and taxes rise and existing social networks are disturbed. Gentrification is a reversal of the process of urban decay and white flight seen in most American cities during the 20th century, where residents voluntarily moved away as urban neighborhoods declined.

In Philadelphia, various neighborhoods, each with a characteristic class and ethnic makeup, are being shaken as newcomers move in. Gentrification affects minorities more harshly due to there being less options for minority families to relocate to compared to white families. The impact of gentrification has been felt most in a number of neighborhoods around Center City such as lower North Philadelphia, Francisville, Northern Liberties, Fishtown, Kensington, Fairmount, Center City West, Hawthorne, University City, Point Breeze, and Grays Ferry.

== Background ==
Philadelphia serves as an example of urban growth, decline, and regrowth along with other industrial cities of the northeastern United States, including Worcester, Massachusetts; Providence, Rhode Island; and Newark and nearby Trenton, New Jersey. Philadelphia has a longer history and arguably richer provenance than its competitor cities. It has a deepwater port and was the first capital of the United States.

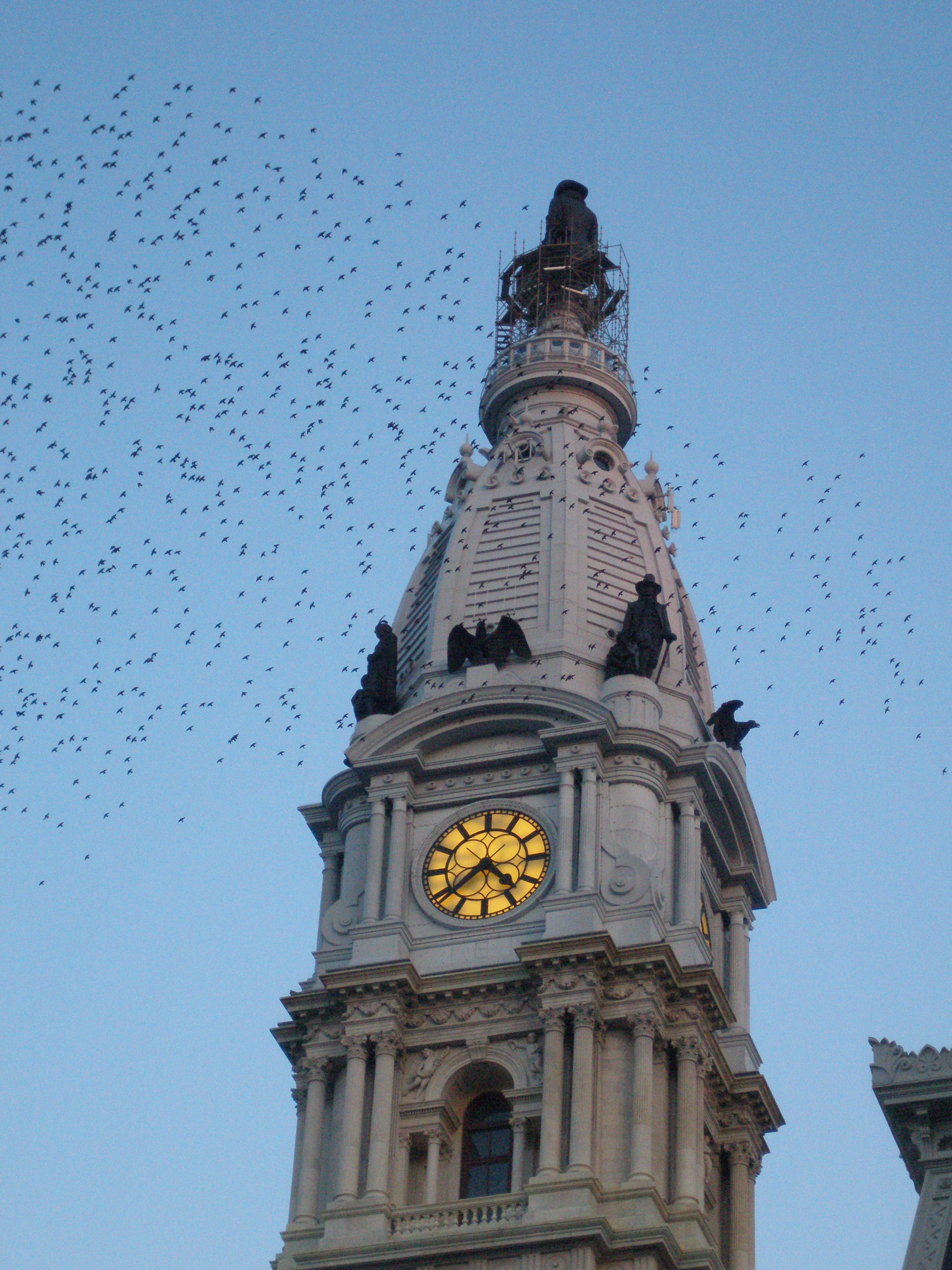
Philadelphia City Hall, with statue of William Penn at top of tower

Development in Philadelphia began along the Delaware, at Penn's Landing, at a spot that enjoys a close approach of the Schuylkill River two miles to the west. Near the Delaware River are the oldest neighborhoods and Independence Hall. Development continued westward to Center City, halfway between the two rivers. By convention, orientation in Philadelphia is in reference to Center City, defined by City Hall. It was completed in 1901, a symbol of the success of the city.

From the end of the Civil War through the 1920s, Philadelphia was an industrial powerhouse. Growth fueled by a deepwater port, proximity to Pennsylvania coalfields, and immigration from Europe brought success in textiles, shipbuilding, locomotives, pharmaceuticals, and even Stetson hats. That wealth paid for neighborhoods of working class, middle class, and luxury housing. The development of the various neighborhoods in the city was the product of the prevalent transportation mode when the neighborhood was developed. For example, early development of the Society Hill neighborhood was driven by the waterborne transport on the Delaware. Trolleys, elevated trains, (and subsequently subways over the same routes) helped develop neighborhoods at the turn of the twentieth century, before the automobile. Likewise, the first suburban bedroom communities developed along the Pennsylvania Railroad's Main Line. Areas then not served by mass transit were likely to be poorer, like South Philadelphia, or richer, like Chestnut Hill.

Philadelphia experienced a boom during WWII, but the city's advantages dissolved in the face of external forces. Textile industries moved to the South. Banking regulation destroyed Philadelphia as a regional banking center. Automation made the Philadelphia Stock Exchange redundant. Consolidation in retail resulted in the absorption of John Wanamaker and Strawbridge and Clothier by national firms. Decline of railroads made Baldwin Locomotive and Budd Company superfluous. Globalization took control of Smith Kline and French to the United Kingdom. And as American men stopped wearing hats, Stetson left.

Curse of Billy Penn Statue
- Buildings taller than the William Penn statue atop Philadelphia City Hall cursed the city's major league teams, none of which won a championship until a Penn statuette was installed at the topping off the Comcast Center in 2007. The Phillies won the World Series in 2008.

Philadelphia population declined in every decade starting in 1950, until 2000. Between 2000 and 2010, the population grew a minuscule 0.6%, with growth accelerating in the following decade. Many of the newcomers choose to live in and near Center City, in neighborhoods that offer easy access to jobs and amenities. While population was rising, urban home ownership was declining, from a nation-leading 59.3 percent in 2000 to 52.2 percent in 2012. Philadelphia also ranked as one of the poorest cities in the U.S., with 26.9 percent of residents deemed poor by federal standards. Of major cities, only Detroit is poorer. As of the 2010 Census, Philadelphia was ranked as the ninth most racially segregated metro area in the U.S., with many residents living in neighborhoods where 75 percent or more of the population consisted of a single racial group.

With renewed growth, neighborhoods convenient to the new employment in the city became attractive. In 1987, the skyline changed. For the previous ninety years, no building was taller than the statue of William Penn atop City Hall. Taller buildings allowed more dense development of the Center City area. The tallest is headquarters of Comcast, headquarters of the largest broadcasting and cable television company in the world, an indication of the city's renaissance. White collar workers at companies like Comcast are ready to invest in communities that had housed less affluent people for decades.

== Urban renewal since 1949 ==
Neighborhood improvement in Philadelphia has been the result of two factors: formal government projects and informal redevelopment in the form of gentrification. From 1949 onward, redevelopment was the result of government projects including highway building, housing projects, and zoning changes, and government-sponsored projects including the development of University City, Southwest Center City and Society Hill. Each of these projects included community displacement. Opponents point to the heavy-handedness of these projects.

Only after about 2000, as the population of the city began to grow again, did gentrification become substantial. There is little evidence that the informal development of gentrification drove substantial amounts of community displacement. In a recent study, the Pew Research Center defined gentrification in Philadelphia as a neighborhood that had an average income 80% of the median in 2000 and higher than average in 2014. It wrote, “gentrification is a relatively small part of the recent story of Philadelphia’s neighborhoods.”

== Neighborhoods ==
=== University City and Mantua ===
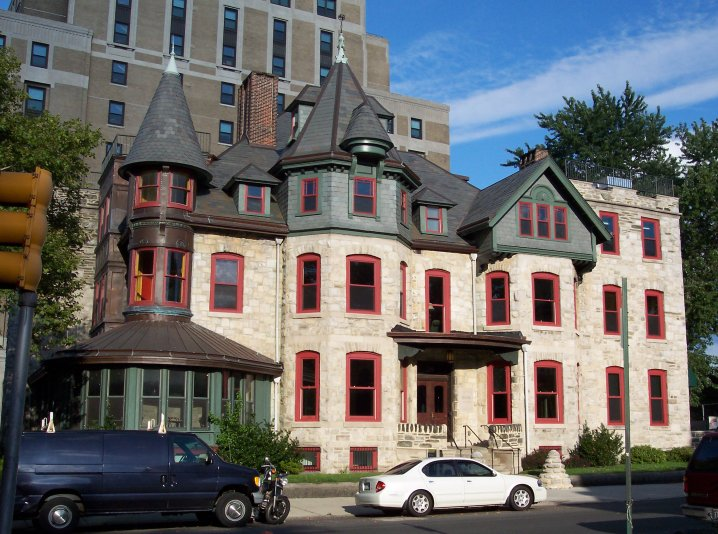
Main Campus building Ross Commons

In 1872, the University of Pennsylvania moved to the west of the Schuylkill River, a mile and a half west of Center City, an area known as West Philadelphia. Drexel University constructed its main building nearby at 32nd and Chestnut Streets in 1889. This northern part of West Philadelphia is Powellton Village and Mantua. The northeast border is Mantua Avenue, the first street west of the Schuylkill River, the bank of the river being taken up by the Pennsylvania Railroad, and more recently, the Schuylkill Expressway.

By the late 1880s, Mantua was a predominantly white, working-class neighborhood. In the 1940s, however, "white flight" occurred due to many factors including redlining, deindustrialization, and suburbanization. As in many other areas of Philadelphia, "white flight" resulted in Mantua becoming a primarily African-American neighborhood. By the 1970s, the neighborhood had declined, and was the site of the 1978 MOVE shootout. In 2014, the median household income was less than $17,000, more than half of Mantua residents lived below the poverty line, and 96% percent of Mantua's children under five lived in poverty. Improving Mantua has become a priority for city leaders, as the neighborhood has been plagued with violence and many blighted properties. In 2008, the Mantua Tower, a public housing project, was demolished. The Tower will be replaced with low density public housing.

The area to the south and west was developed by the University of Pennsylvania (Penn). The campus experienced growth after World War II as a result of the GI Bill. The site of the Philadelphia Almshouse, later named the Philadelphia General Hospital, became the campus of the Children's Hospital of Philadelphia (CHOP) in 1974. The area occupied by Drexel, Penn, and CHOP is known as University City. Other participants in this development included Philadelphia College of Pharmacy and Science, Presbyterian Hospital (Philadelphia), and Philadelphia College of Osteopathic Medicine working together to build the University City Science Center.

Development of University City was the result of both government policy and economic drivers. Land for new facilities was relatively cheap. Developers built housing to accommodate student housing. In so doing, existing residents were pushed out. The areas to the west and northwest of University City remain blighted.

Penn's first significant but controversial expansion into the community was done with the aid of the federal slum clearance program. The Housing Act of 1949 allowed Penn to rebuild West Philadelphia under the Slum Clearance and Community Development and Redevelopment program.. An exact number of the people displaced isn't known, but figures range from 5,000 – 10,000. Soon after that, the West Philadelphia Corporation, consisting of Penn, Drexel University, An earlier Housing Act would give the institutions generous grants to building academic centers, and soon enough, West Philadelphia became Urban Renewal Areas 3, 4, and 5. Area 3 consisted mainly of the Black Bottom neighborhood, and while described by newspapers as "20 devastated acres of rundown bars and garages and warehouses," it was still home to hundreds of families who soon found themselves without a home.

In retrospect, early federal attempts at urban redevelopment were destined to fail. According to the annual business review from Federal Reserve Archival System for Economic Research, 800,000 units of public housing have been erected; however, according to a research from Harvard University, Title I and III under the program were later discredited generally for not solving the housing problem and yet, fostered a worse form of slum in high-density projects. University City did not include public housing projects, unlike Hawthorne in South Philadelphia.

In the 1990s, opposite to Philadelphia, however, University City experienced a significant move-ins. According to The Pew Charitable Trusts, up till 2014, well-educated white millennials took up 40% of the population within University City, Philadelphia.. Besides, University City median house prices rose from $110,000 to $350,000 from 2000 to 2006. Furthermore, its average household income increased steadily from $30,000 to $50,000 from the 1990s to 2010s.

In spring 2015, Brookings Institution led a group of ten Penn institutions to enhance the city's inter-connectivity under program Bass Initiative on Innovation and Placemaking. As part of Penn's effort to have the university integrated into West Philadelphia, Penn has sponsored a program to make their staff and faculty residents of nearby neighborhoods. The university had instituted the Home Ownership Incentive Program that provided $3,000 per year for seven years or $15,000 up front for housing expenses to employees who purchased homes in University City. The only restriction was that the employees must live in the house for seven years. The employees who already owned a home in the designated area could get up to $7,500 in matching funds toward exterior home improvements. The program has changed recently in that it only covers $7500 in a no-interest or forgivable loan. A program has been in effect since 1965, when it created the Guaranteed Mortgage Program, which offers an option to finance 120 percent of the cost for a property needing rehabilitation. Over the last 30 years, staff, faculty and young professionals have been buying homes further and further west, southwest and northwest raising the collective property values of those neighborhoods.

As another incentive, the university helped to build Penn Alexander Elementary School, a state-of-the-art K-8 school designed to make the neighborhood even more attractive to professors and other affluent residents. However, the school only accepts students who live within a certain radius, and alienates many of the poorer residents in University City. However, this wasn't the only school Penn had a hand in building. In 1963, University City High School was planned as a magnet feeder school for the universities in the area. Residents in the community fought against it, not believing that their children would be allowed in. After countless battles, the school was built, was predominantly African American, and was afflicted with the problems typical of an inner-city high school. The school was eventually closed in 2013 and was demolished in 2015.

=== Chinatown ===
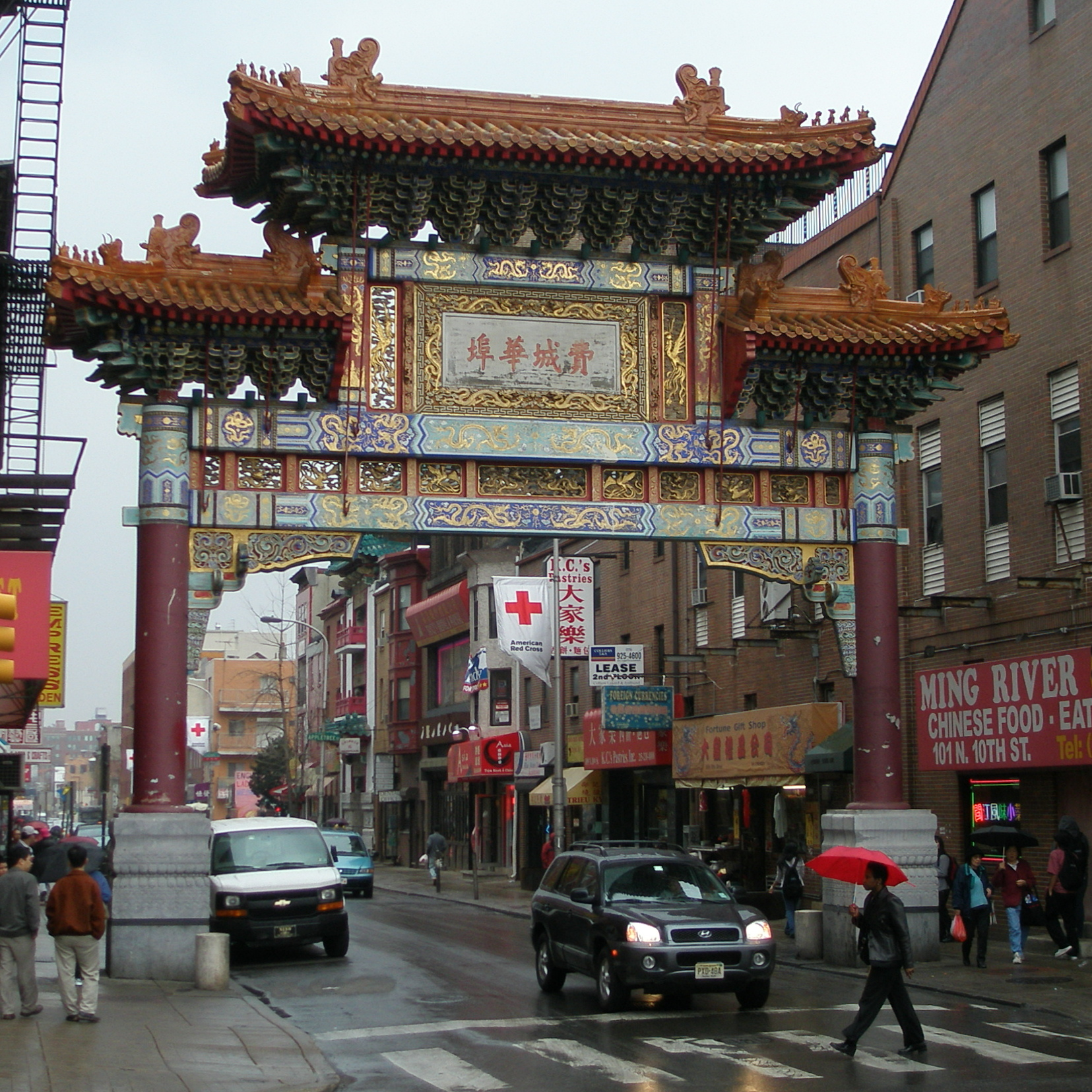
The Chinatown Friendship Gate

History

Between 1882 and 1943, the population of Philadelphia's Chinatown was controlled under Chinese Exclusion Act and Geary Act. In the 1920s, the population was about 1,600, but as the 1960s and 70s approached, Chinatown lost about 26% of its housing and the population went down to around 400 people. Between 1943 and 1980, after passage of the Chinese Exclusion Repeal Act, Chinatown grew in size, from Wood Street, south to Arch Street, and east–west from Eighth to Twelfth Street and the area soon became home to many Asian immigrants.

As of the 2000 U.S. census, the city ranked the 11th for Asian population within United States. The Asian population took up 80% of Chinatown's population. The ethnic groups included Filipinos, Japanese, Asian Indians, Koreans, Vietnamese, Cambodians, Hmong, Laotians, Thais and Chinese.

Gentrification

Philadelphia's Chinatown is close to Center City. The central location of Chinatown put it in competition with other land uses. From the 1960s through the 1980s, parts of Chinatown were destroyed for the Vine Street Expressway and the Pennsylvania Convention Center. As a result, Chinatown is now geographically constrained, not dissimilar to the situation in other urban centers, including New York and San Francisco. Nevertheless, city government seems committed to preserving it. The Friendship Gate, completed in 1984, was the first authentic Chinese gate created by artists from China.

Chinatown has encountered many brushes with community displacement and has fought it off many times with mixed results. In 1992, there was a proposal for a federal prison to be built at 8th and Callowhill Streets in Chinatown. After two years of the Chinatown community fighting it, the plan was thrown out. In the mid- 1960s, the Pennsylvania Department of Transportation (PennDOT) announced plans to build the Vine Street Expressway. In 1973 PennDOT included the demolition of a building on 10th and Vine Streets and Holy Redeemer Catholic Church. When the demolition crew arrived, they found Chinese youth protesting on the demolition machines. They managed to slow the construction of the Vine Street Expressway, but in the end it was still built. The Gallery shopping mall and the Pennsylvania Convention Center are other completed projects that limit the expansion of Chinatown and which proceeded in spite of community objection.

In 2000, there was a proposal to build a baseball stadium in Chinatown. Many of the people in Chinatown felt that the construction of the stadium would negatively impact the community by adding congestion and obnoxious fans, and they felt it would not bring anything positive to the community. Chinatown organizations united to stop the construction of the stadium. There were also plans to open a casino at the Gallery on 8th and Market Streets. The Chinatown community successfully opposed it; the casino was built instead on the Delaware River waterfront. The proposed arena 76 Place at Market East was opposed by many Chinatown residents on similar grounds.

=== East Falls ===
East Falls is northwest of Center City, about four miles up the Schuylkill River, which originally provided the power for textile mills. Since the nineteenth century, the east bank of the Schuylkill has housed a mix of working and middle-class families. It is home to the William Penn Charter School, Philadelphia University (founded in 1884 as Philadelphia Textile School and later known as Philadelphia College of Textiles and Science), and the former site of the Medical College of Pennsylvania. Philadelphia University merged with Thomas Jefferson University in 2017. Whether it expands its East Fall footprint remains to be seen. According to Jennifer Greenfield, the first vice president of the East Falls Community Council, “The university wanted to expand outwards, but now we convinced them to expand upward.” Efforts such as this to maintain the integrity of the neighborhood are evidence that despite evident gentrification and other changes, East Falls will remain the working and middle-class neighborhood that it is today.

A planned community transformation was thwarted in 2005, when Donald Trump proposed locating a casino in the former Budd factory. This plan fell through because of community protests. Proponents of the proposed casino claimed that it would bring more business to East Falls, while the East Falls Community Council argued that crime would increase. In the end, the state gaming control commission rejected the proposal in favor of the SugarHouse Casino in Fishtown.

=== Society Hill ===
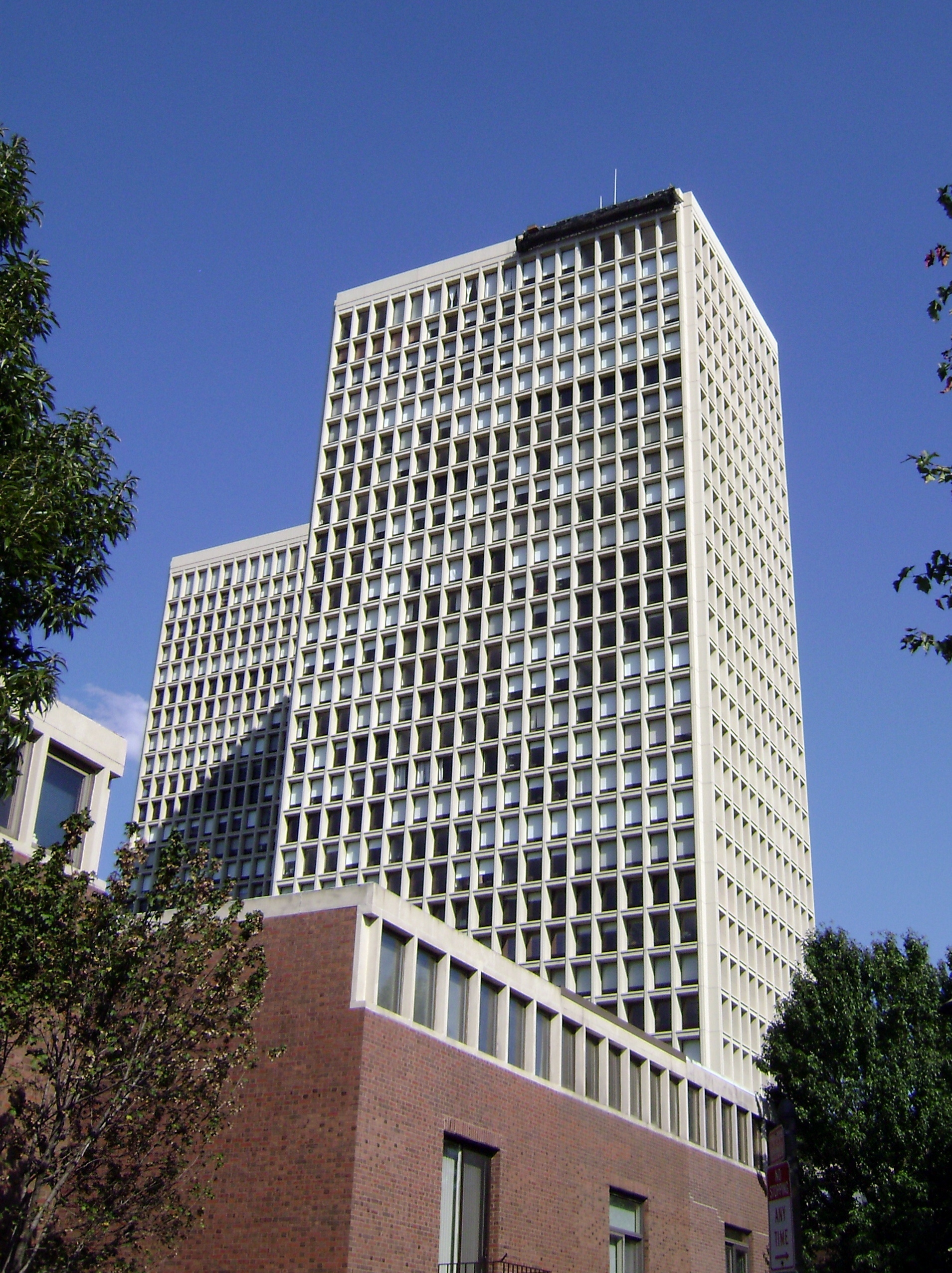
Society Hill Towers, 210 Locust St

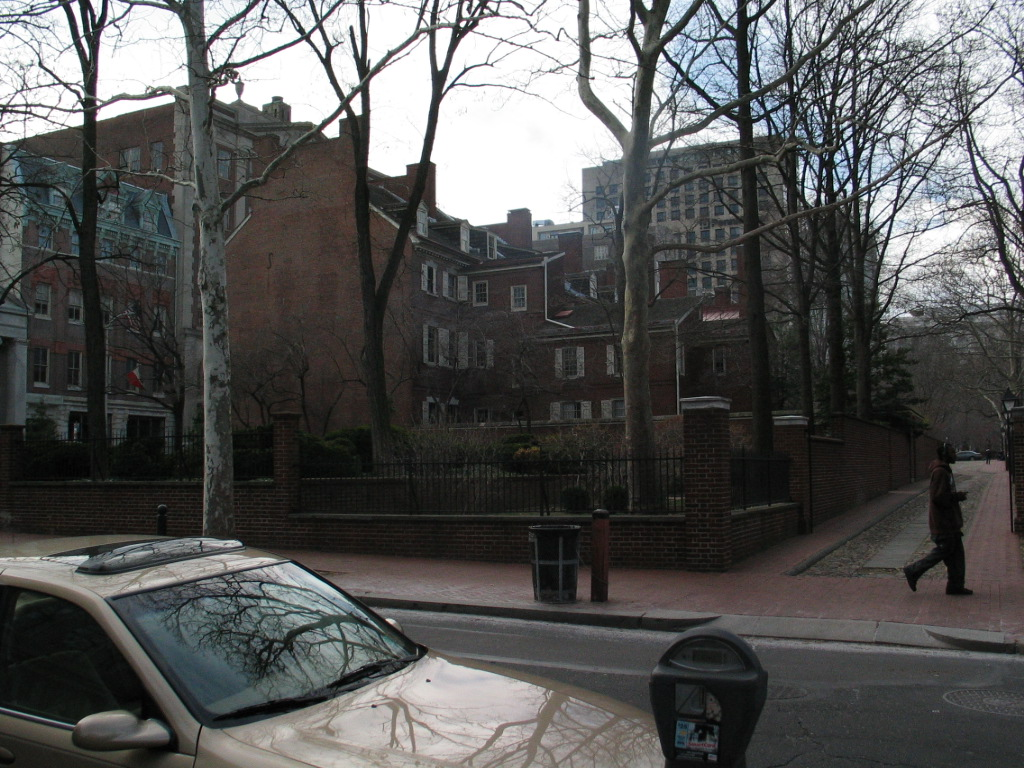
National Historic Landmarks are near Society Hill, Philadelphia

Society Hill is the oldest neighborhood in Philadelphia, a mile southeast of Center City, close the Delaware River, and home to history civil buildings including Independence Hall. In the 19th century, the area lost appeal as the city's main commercial district moved west and the affluent residents moved closer to Center City or to areas like Chestnut Hill and the Main Line. The neighborhood then became an African American community centered around the Mother Bethel Church at 6th and Lombard. W.E.B. Du Bois studied the neighborhood in the late 19th and early 20th centuries as an employee of the University of Pennsylvania. In his groundbreaking work of urban sociology, The Philadelphia Negro, DuBois documented the awful conditions of the neighborhood: "We lived there for a year, in the midst of an atmosphere of dirt, drunkenness, poverty, and crime. Murder sat at our doorsteps, police were our government..." W.E.B. DuBois studied the 7th Ward, which only includes roughly two blocks of what is today known as Society Hill. Also, US Census data shows that Society Hill in 1940 (census tract 10) was a racially mixed area and quite consistent with the rest of Philadelphia. The houses deteriorated until the 1950s.

In the 1880s, Society Hill had average home prices. By 1960, home prices had dropped to the tenth percentile (ninety percent of homes in the city were more valuable). By 1970, the neighborhood had surged to the ninetieth percentile. It appears government policy was a key factor. In 1948, Edmund Bacon, head of the Philadelphia City Planning Commission, created plans to “redevelop” Society Hill. In 1956, the Old Philadelphia Development Corporation joined the Philadelphia Redevelopment Authority (RDA) in the effort. In the 1950s, the RDA acquired 31 acres (130,000 m^{2}) of land in the Dock Street area by declaring it "blighted". They designed standards of restoration for historic property. In 1960, owners were forced to renovate their houses or their property would be declared blighted and the RDA would use eminent domain to obtain the property. Residents of these “blighted” homes were often forced out, for a variety of reasons. Some residents could not pay for the renovation of their houses, others were renters, and their landlords would not pay. In either case, the RDA, through blight declaration, bought out many African American residents and sold the houses to people who agreed to restore the exteriors, virtually all of whom were white.

In 1964, Society Hill Towers, a three tower residential complex designed by I.M. Pei, along with a low-rise project, Society Hill Twownhouses, were completed. The buildings were listed on the Philadelphia Register of Historic Places on March 10, 1999.

=== Fishtown and the riverfront ===
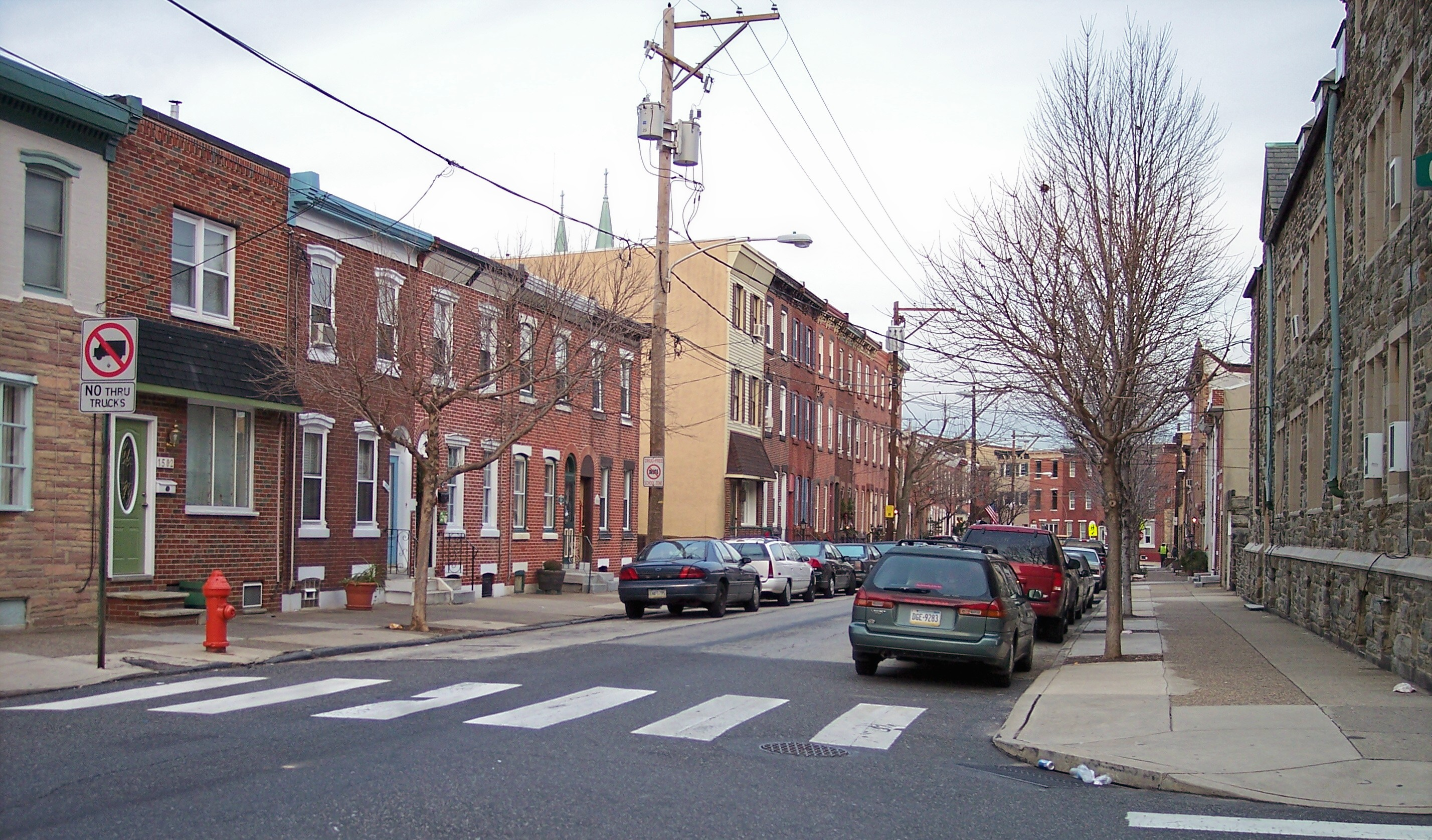
Berks Street in Fishtown

Fishtown, is an area to the northeast of Center City on the banks of the Delaware River. The neighborhood has traditionally been home to a large working class and working poor Irish Catholic population. Fishtown's proximity to Center City and other gentrifying neighborhoods, Northern Liberties and Old City, the hipster culture has recently spread into Fishtown and the surrounding area. Artists, musicians, and young professionals have been drawn to the area, and they are rapidly buying up properties. The nightlife and art scene, resulting from the growing population of "hipsters", creates a new and young atmosphere in the neighborhood. This change in the make-up and character of the neighborhood attracts more people of the same relatively young and affluent demographic, thus reinforcing the process of gentrification.

Due to the widespread availability of housing and the high rate of home ownership, there were initially not been many people displaced by the gentrification of Fishtown. In the past eight years, however, the housing values have more than doubled leading to many low income renters being pushed out. There have been some tensions and conflicts between the locals and the new, young residents, but many long-time inhabitants seem to welcome influx of high-income people who bring more resources.

=== Fairmount ===
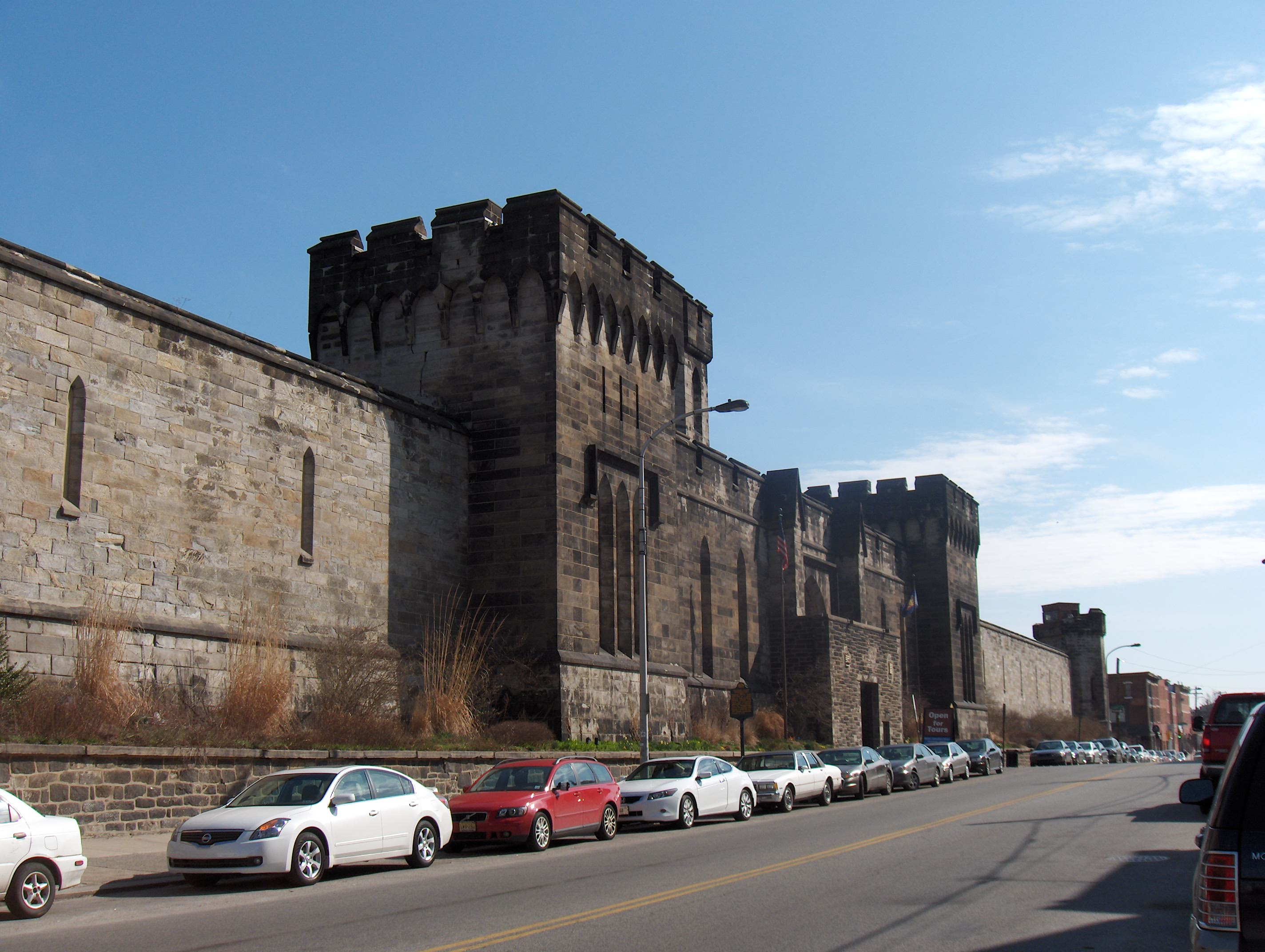
The Eastern State Penitentiary

Fairmount is a neighborhood a mile north of Center City. During the 19th century, Irish and German immigrants made up most of the neighborhood's population. In the early 20th century Polish and Ukrainian immigrants also began coming to Fairmount.

The Fairmount neighborhood changed dramatically after the 1940s and 1950s. The Girard Avenue shopping area was destroyed in the Columbia Avenue Riot, and has never been substantially developed since. Also, the residents of Fairmount experienced the hardships of deindustrialization; factories closed and poverty and crime increased. The demographics of the area changed as many white residents moved to suburban areas, and parts of the neighborhood became predominantly African-American or Hispanic.

The addition of upscale town homes in the 1980s and 1990s caused displacement of longtime minority residents as younger generations moved away from Fairmount when they could no longer afford to live there. The real estate boom began to draw many affluent white people back from the suburbs to neighborhoods like Fairmount. Members of the community have worked diligently to preserve and improve their surroundings. The neighborhood remains largely white, but it continues to become gentrified. Younger professional families, students, and singles are moving in. The attraction for most is its proximity to Center City, Fairmount Park, and the Philadelphia Museum of Art.

=== Southwest Center City ===
Southwest Center City is located immediately to the southwest of Center City. It is also known as the Graduate Hospital area. Settlement in the area began in 1684. It was primarily an immigrant neighborhood and eventually became a thriving African American commercial and entertainment district. In 1947, the Philadelphia City Planning Commission proposed the Crosstown Expressway, a multi-lane highway across the city along the blocks between South Street and Lombard Street. This project would have effectively separated the different “land usages” to the north and south, which would have been, in essence, separating racial groups. The project would have also uprooted several thousands of people from homes they had owned for years, if not generations.

Fearing that their homes would be confiscated through use of eminent domain, many residents sold their homes and left the area, while others stayed to fight back. The Citizens’ Committee to Preserve and Develop the Crosstown Community (CCPDCC), was formed in opposition to the expressway and was composed mostly of white residents from the Society Hill and Rittenhouse Square areas, as well as the black residents along the path of the planned expressway. As a result of this opposition, the plans for the expressway ultimately fell through, leaving the area full of abandoned property.

The narrative of the area parallels that of University City. Neighborhood advocates claim that Graduate Hospital, an established hospital on the edge of the neighborhood, took advantage of the cheap, abandoned property and expanded through a process of buying properties and letting them deteriorate to bring other property values down. As people moved out of the declining neighborhood, Graduate Hospital bought more of the abandoned property until it could build a new hospital building. The hospital provided necessary services, however, they did not confine their expansion to sections of the neighborhood approved during negotiations with the community. Several community organizations banded together and, though there was some displacement, residents and local merchants were able to maintain their neighborhood. Recently, due to the spread of the upscale businesses and residences of Center City toward western South Street, property values have risen, and there has been further displacement of lower income, mostly minority, inhabitants. The former Graduate Hospital is now Penn Medicine at Rittenhouse, a rehabilitation and acute-care facility owned by University of Pennsylvania Health System.

Flight of black residents from the neighborhood has continued in the 21st century. Pew estimates that 4,000 black people left the neighborhood between 2000 and 2014.

=== Hawthorne ===
Hawthorne is a small portion of South Philadelphia just south of Center City. The area is home to the former Ridgeway Library, which is now CAPA (Philadelphia High School for Creative and Performing Arts).

Hawthorne was the target of federal housing initiatives in the 1960s. Four low income housing towers comprising 576 housing units were built in the Martin Luther King Plaza, in the 700 block of South 13th Street. They, like similar projects in other urban areas were afflicted with crime, physical deterioration, fragmented services, and increasing levels of poverty. On October 17, 1999, the building was demolished and was replaced by a residential development with mixed-income housing funded through HOPE VI, an initiative of the Department of Housing and Urban Development (HUD). The construction of the new homes was completed in the end of 2004. This new housing became an integral part of the neighborhood; it wasn't a separate entity as the MLK towers had been. The development is equipped with a park and recreation center, as well as support services to help residents get and keep jobs. The neighborhood also has mixed raced committees organized to keep the area clean and make it more welcoming and beneficial to the community's users.

Despite the positive results of the initiative's efforts, it ultimately led to community displacement. Only half as many low density units replaced the high-rises. The former residents of the MLK towers were dispersed during the construction. many former residents could not afford to move into and sustain a living in the new MLK complex. This has ultimately changed the demographic of the neighborhood; prior to the government intervention and development provided by Hope VI, the neighborhood was predominantly African American. However, since federal intervention, the community is about 67% White, 12% Black, 15% Asian, and 6% Latino.

=== South Philadelphia ===
South Philadelphia is the area to the south of Center City, from the Delaware to the Schuylkill. The area is dominated by row-houses and traditionally home to Italian Americans. The City Planning Commission in 2000 declared the area at 9th and Ellsworth blighted. It is five blocks from the Philadelphia landmark Pat's King of Steaks. Recently, however, Mexican and Chinese immigrants have been moving in, opening businesses, and renovating the housing stock (126 percent increase in Asians from 1990 to 2000).

Following this revival of the area, the only part of the neighborhood still in a state of deterioration was the Ice House, a building abandoned by owner Jerald Goldfine who paid taxes to resist condemnation. The Ice House was a paradox: it increased in value as the area improved, but it was also the only structure keeping the area from reaching its true potential. In response, in 2007 Councilman Frank DiCicco proposed a redevelopment bill. However, the surrounding areas were included in the redevelopment bill as well, meaning that the immigrant businesses responsible for the upswing could potentially be seized by eminent domain at any time. There was huge public outcry, but the bill was passed anyway, even without the community's support. So far only the Ice House has been seized, and there are plans to build a two 31 story building in its place. At this point, no residents have been displaced.

== See also ==
- Community displacement
- Development-induced displacement
- Forced migration
- Gentrification

== Bibliography ==
- Greenberg, Brian (2008). Social History of the United States, (10 Vol. Set ) (1st ed.). ABC-CLIO. ISBN 978-1598841275.
