= Gentrification of Vancouver =

The gentrification of Vancouver, Canada, has been the subject of debate between those who wish to promote gentrification and those who do not.

Gentrification in Vancouver has taken place in the context of a strong environmental movement, high land prices, real estate development, and the development of former industrial sites owned by the City of Vancouver or whose redevelopment was influenced by city zoning regulation. Historically, Vancouver's geographic location has made it the transportation hub connecting Western Canada to Asia. This enriched the area with raw materials and led to a booming manufacturing industry centered on the Canadian Pacific Railway networks. Numerous warehouses, timber mills, rail yard facilities and wartime industries were constructed in easy-to-access areas like Coal Harbour and False Creek. Working-class neighbourhoods were established in surrounding areas like Kitsilano, Strathcona and Grandview–Woodland. However, in the 1950s the area entered a period of decline, caused largely by the growing prominence of freight trucking and new industrial complexes such as Annacis Island being built on relatively cheap suburban land close to the freeways. This created rent-gap theory conditions and eventual gentrification in several inner-city Vancouver neighbourhoods.

== Early gentrification ==
Gentrification in Vancouver has occurred differently in many of its districts. Changes in the area of Kitsilano in the 1960s and 1970s were among the first to gentrify. The neighbourhood was a traditionally a working-class residential neighbourhood during Vancouver's industrial days. Following the decline of heavy industry, as workers moved out, the area's low rent and proximity to downtown Vancouver, the high quality of life due to its closeness to Vancouver's beaches, and the nearby University of British Columbia made it attractive for artists and students. It subsequently became the heart of the city's counterculture movement, giving rise to Greenpeace in 1970. As the area became more artistic and vibrant, innovative young professionals began making improvements to the area's old wood-frame houses. The city came under pressure to halt the expansion of high-rise buildings, which were becoming commonplace across English Bay in what is known as the West End. David Ley argues that this direct action to halt the spread of gentrification actually worsened the effects, as the city down-zoned Kitsilano and homemade improvement loans were easily available. The lower density, tree-lined streets, access to the beach and downtown and relative ease of renovation made the area an attractive place for young professionals, which caused housing demand and prices to increase. This cycle of improvement and rising property prices has transformed the area into a trendy strip for the city's growing class of "yuppies".

== Production-side gentrification ==
Other areas of Vancouver, such as the north and south shores of False Creek, tend to follow the production-side model of gentrification. Here, investors and city planners saw a rent gap between current and potential property value if the land was redeveloped, and decided to capitalize on this. Investment on the north shore of False Creek skyrocketed before and after Expo 86, which had previously been abandoned on rail and industrial land. Hong Kong real estate developer Li Ka-shing, the primary shareholder of Concord Pacific Developments, was the first major foreign developer in the area and paved the way for a influx of Asian investment in prominent urban property following the British transfer of sovereignty over Hong Kong to China. Concord Pacific developed a series of mid to high-rise mixed-residential buildings that fit well with the city's vision of a livable downtown. These residential buildings featured high density, proximity to amenities and ample parks and walkways along the waterfront. This trend has been replicated across the downtown core, particularly on the opposing south side of False Creek, where the Olympic Village for the 2010 Winter Olympics was built. This architectural style has been dubbed "Vancouverism", and has helped Vancouver acquire the title of "the world's most livable city" five years in a row—though none of these indices include the cost of living, which Vancouver also tops. In Noah Quastel's article, "Political Ecologies of Gentrification", he explains how the platform of greening and sustainability helps justify the displacement of locals in Vancouver.

== Zoning regulation ==
Zoning policy has set the conditions for gentrification in Vancouver. From 2014, the City of Vancouver introduced new Local Area Plans in Marpole, Grandview–Woodland, Downtown Eastside, Mount Pleasant and the West End that re-zone many existing buildings to allow for a larger buildings (up-zoning). Up-zoning can stifle small local area businesses since British Columbia's property tax policy allows an up-zoned building to be taxed based on its potential size instead of its actual size, which may contribute to the introduction of higher-cost goods and services characteristic of retail gentrification. The Grandview–Woodland Local Area plan also encouraged a "Food and Arts District" to develop in the industrial area to include "food and beverage products", "tasting rooms" and "studio art". Such industrial integration can indirectly encourage gentrification.

The British Columbia Residential Tenancy Act slows gentrification by limiting rent increases to levels below what the market will bear in a gentrifying area. However, a component of the act allows an owner to have a tenant vacate their unit if the landlord has a permit to make renovations to the unit. This is allowing "renoviction" (eviction under the auspices of renovations needing to be made) and gentrification, particularly in the Downtown Eastside, Strathcona, and Grandview–Woodland local areas.

== Specific neighbourhoods ==
=== Downtown Eastside and Chinatown ===
The Downtown Eastside and Chinatown, the "Inner City", has been an area of focus in recent decades. With Gastown having nearly completely transformed through the influx of capital, the edges of the DTES and southern edge of Chinatown have seen significant recent developments. Restaurateurs have set up a number of new businesses, gentrifying the area.

=== Grandview–Woodland ===
Grandview–Woodland experienced little gentrification between 1971 and 2008 as a result of impediments including high levels of crime, a significant amount of social housing, and the presence of active industrial manufacturing. However, the area began to show signs of gentrification in 2008, including retail gentrification, an upwards shift in income, demographic changes, and the loss of affordable housing. Retail spaces along Hastings Street and Commercial Drive have been transitioning from businesses serving low-income residents to upscale food, drink, and specialty stores.

== Resistance to development ==
Just as some neighbourhoods have been passionate supporters of gentrification, others have been equally opposed to it. Most notably, the Downtown Eastside (DTES) has opposed gentrification at every turn. David Ley has examined why gentrification seems to have completely neglected this section of the city, which begins just blocks from Vancouver's ultra-high value financial district. He attributes this to a combination of local resistance, led by the Downtown Eastside Residents Association, a large amount of available social housing and, "a street scene that has proved too raw for most middle-class sensibilities". An example of opposing visions of the DTES was the replacement of the Woodward's Building, which was once the premier shopping centre in Vancouver, but was vacant from 1993 and consequently demolished in 2006. After much debate the new building was constructed with mixed commercial, market-priced condos and social housing. Though arguments have suggested that the redeveloped space would not affect the surrounding areas and that these projects would include social housing, opponents of the development claim that after a few projects, it would result in a lot of inhabitants being displaced, and possibly push out social services that create no revenue for the city, such as safe injection sites. Jean Swanson of the Carnegie Community Action Project reported that Chinatown potentially offers services to thousands of low-income Chinese seniors who commute daily to Chinatown to shop, and that by developing it for a different class, it would take away the independence and comfort that many seniors still grasp onto. In a recent 2011 development permit application regarding Sequel 138, a new condo development, the same situation has been brought up only to have 34 social groups call for a rejection of the permit by the City of Vancouver. Thirty professors from the University of British Columbia, Simon Fraser University and the British Columbia Institute of Technology have stated that permits tend to only include the technical and legal matters but in this case they should consider social impacts, as they are generally far larger than people expect. It was suggested that the permit be put on hold until a study of the social impacts of gentrification of the DTES is completed.
