= History of Metropolitan Atlanta Rapid Transit Authority =

The Metropolitan Atlanta Rapid Transit Authority is the principal public transit agency in metropolitan Atlanta. It primarily serves Fulton, Clayton, and Dekalb counties. MARTA's formation in 1965 was a result of the campaigning efforts of governmental planning agencies and Atlanta businessmen. The system broke ground on its rail system in 1975.

== Background ==
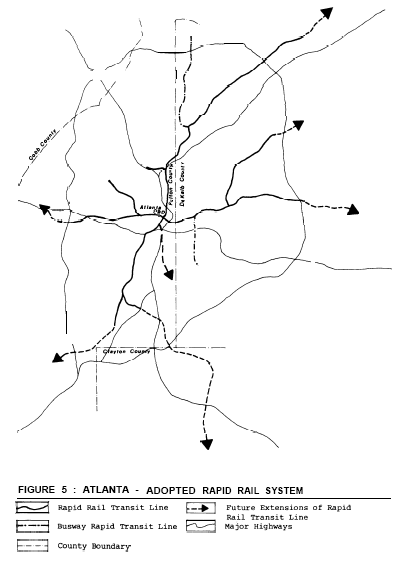
Map of the initial plan of the MARTA system from the 1970s

The first mention of rapid transit for Atlanta occurred in a series of regional planning reports prepared by the Metropolitan Planning Commission (MPC) in 1950 and 1954. The 1950 report, named Up Ahead, and the 1954 report, named Now for Tomorrow, both primarily dealt with freeway planning, but both specifically mentioned the long-range need for rapid transit in Atlanta.

The MPC began to study rapid transit further, and in two subsequent reports (Access to central Atlanta and Crosstown and bypass expressways) the MPC concluded that increased highway construction would not be adequate to meet future transportation needs. These recommendations were not welcomed by the Georgia Highway Department, who believed that highways were an adequate solution.

Three reports were published in the early 1960s helped to give momentum to the push for rapid transit. Two reports were from the Atlanta Region Metropolitan Planning Commission (ARMPC): a 1960 report titled What you should know about rapid transit and a 1961 report titled Atlanta region comprehensive plan: rapid transit which called for 60 miles (97 km) of high speed rapid rail transport serving five counties at a cost of $200–215 million. These reports viewed transit as a means to shaping and planning the future of the Atlanta region, as well as maintaining Atlanta's role as a regional center in the southeast. The third report, titled Rapid Atlanta was published in 1960 by the Atlanta Transit System which proposed a $59 million first phase of a 16-mile (26 km) rapid transit system. This report received support in Atlanta's business community; in 1961 the president of the Atlanta Chamber of Commerce, Ivan Allen, named a rapid transit steering committee, which included Robert L. Sommerville, president of the Atlanta Transit System (Atlanta's public busing system), and was headed by Richard Rich, a former Chamber president. This committee worked with the ARMPC to send speakers to civic organizations and business groups to discuss rapid transit. Also in 1961 Atlanta mayor William Hartsfield appointed a rapid transit committee which worked with the ARMPC to lobby members of the Georgia General Assembly to look favorably on rapid transit. In 1962 the lobbying efforts proved successful; the Georgia legislature created the Metropolitan Atlanta Transit Study Commission (MATSC).

== Formation of MARTA ==
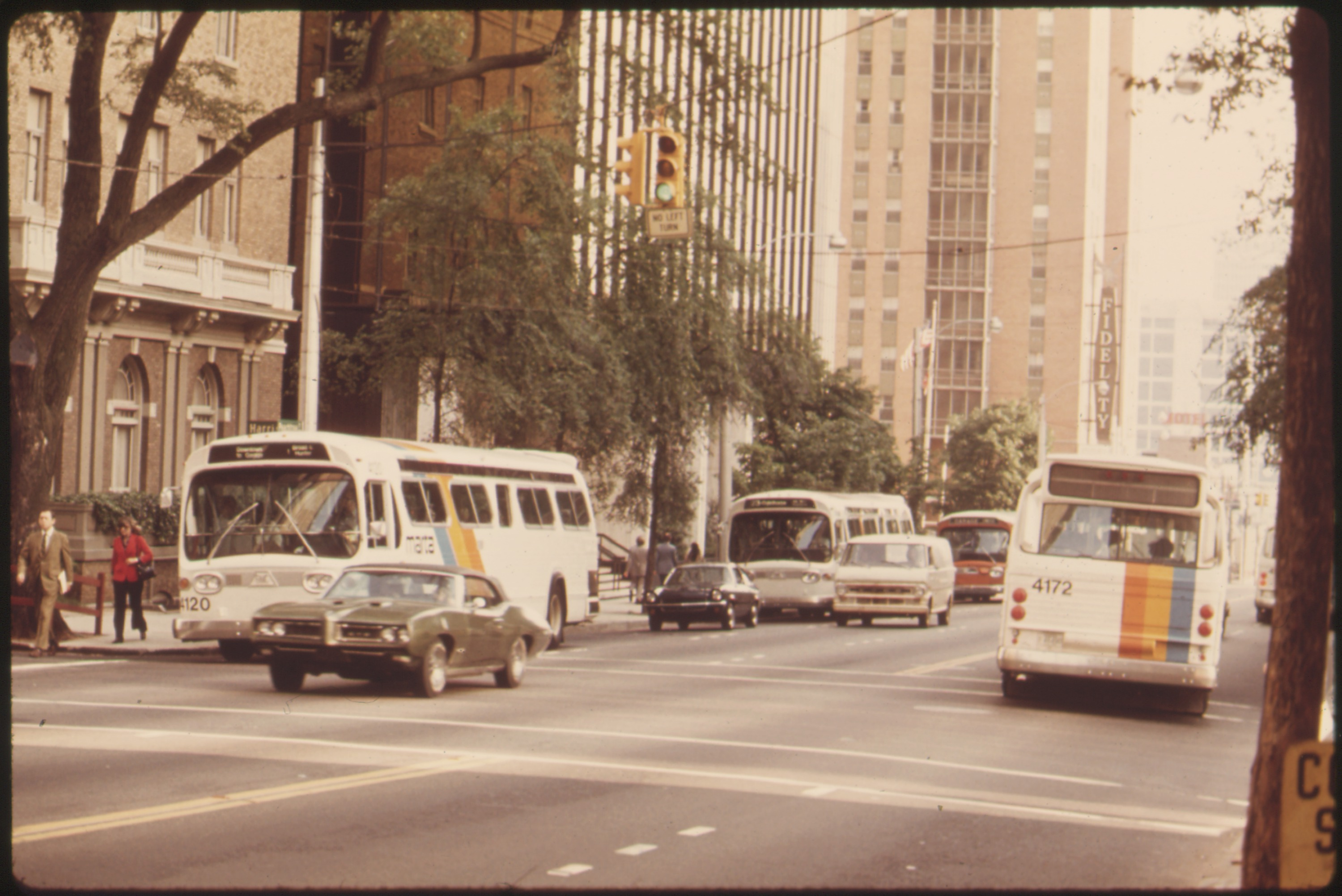
MARTA buses in Downtown Atlanta, June 1974

A state constitutional amendment was required to establish a regional transportation agency. In November 1962 this amendment was approved by a majority of voters in DeKalb and Fulton counties but failed to pass statewide. The amendment did not specify the composition of the agency but stated in more general terms the nature of powers for the agency (taxing, eminent domain, expenditure of public funds) that would be designated by the state to a lower agency for the purposes of transit planning. As a result, many rural voters believed they were committing themselves to pay for a transit system in Atlanta. Opposition was also raised by the trucking industry in defense of highway funds.

In December 1962 the MATSC published a report titled A Plan and Program of Rapid Transit for the Atlanta Metropolitan Region which called for a 66-mile (106 km), 42 station rapid rail transit system with feeder buses and park-and-ride facilities across five counties centered upon downtown Atlanta. In March 1963 the MATSC formed a committee which came to be known as the Rapid Transit Committee of 100 for the purpose of financing and publicizing the rapid transit campaign as outlined in the December 1962 report. In the same year the MATSC was dissolved by the state and replaced by a new organization called the Georgia State Study Commission. The Study Commission reviewed and approved the previous MATSC transit plan. The continued campaigning by regional and local groups led to the passing of a second transit-enabling state constitutional amendment in 1964. This second amendment however was not proposed statewide but was placed only on the ballots of five metropolitan Atlanta counties (Fulton, Cobb, Gwinnett, DeKalb, and Clayton). Approval was slim in Cobb county where the margin was only 403 votes.

The 1965 Metropolitan Atlanta Rapid Transit Authority Act was authored by State Senator Ben F. Johnson of DeKalb County. In March of that year it was passed by the Georgia legislature setting up a rapid transit agency but required ratification by the five counties. In June 1965 voters in four of the five counties approved the creation of MARTA; only 43 percent of voters approved MARTA in Cobb County. MARTA was officially formed in January 1966.

=== 1968 referendum ===
MARTA began work on developing a new 4 county rapid transit plan. In 1967 the agency published a new plan, titled Special Report - Rapid Transit for Metropolitan Atlanta, a 54-mile (87 km) rapid transit rail system, at a cost of $190 million more than the previous 66-mile (106 km) MATSC plan. Fears about the cost of the plan were published in a counter-proposal by Robert Somerville of the Atlanta Transit System, titled Rapid Busways, challenging the MARTA plan. Rapid Busways called for the creation of a 32-mile (51 km) network of busways at a cost of $52 million as an interim plan to Atlanta's transit needs.

MARTA consultants worked to update the original MATSC plan into a smaller 40-mile (64 km) rapid rail system, however this report was not published until September 1968. In November 1968 a Fulton County, DeKalb County, and city of Atlanta referendum allowing MARTA to move into capital programs failed to pass, receiving only 44.5 percent voter support. The failure of the funding referendum to pass has been attributed to many reasons:

- The continuing controversy over the use of rail transport over busway transit
- The decision of local transit unions to campaign against the referendum because it did not contain collective bargaining provisions
- Conservatives claimed that the plan was financially irresponsible since Federal government financial support was not guaranteed
- Low-income and suburban homeowners objected to the use of property tax to fund MARTA
- Voters on the edge of the system objected because they felt that residents of the city of Atlanta would receive more benefits
- Atlanta's black community complained it had not been involved in the planning and would not receive adequate service
- Local officials in the region were not involved in planning
- Publicity of the plan by MARTA was poor (despite a MARTA-sponsored fact-finding trip to Montreal and Toronto attended by many Atlanta business leaders to ride their existing subways)

=== 1971 referendum ===
As a result of the 1968 referendum failure, MARTA began to address some of the controversial issues. MARTA enlisted the support of organized labor by amending the MARTA legislation to include collective bargaining provisions. Also MARTA began a campaign to draw in public officials and blacks into the planning of MARTA. MARTA also modified proposed service plans to include improved service to black neighborhoods, including its decision to use rail instead of bus service for the east–west and Proctor Creek Lines. Also the financial support of the system was changed from an unpopular property tax increase to a one-percent sales tax. Finally MARTA pledged to reduce bus fares to 15 cents for the first seven years.

The plan on the 1971 referendum showed 56.2 miles (90.4 km) of rapid rail lines in 4 counties and 14.4 miles (23.2 km) of busways. Voters in DeKalb (52% support) and Fulton (51% support) counties approved the proposal, and voters in Clayton (23% support) and Gwinnett (21% support) defeated the proposal. The voters in Clayton and Gwinnett may have reacted negatively to the proposed plan which included only 9 miles (14 km) of the rail system would have served both counties. Additionally the method of counting votes was changed for the 1971 referendum. In 1968 voters were grouped into three groups (all of which required a majority for passing): voters in the city limits of Atlanta, voters in Fulton county outside the city limits, and voters in DeKalb outside of the city limits. In 1971 the city votes were counted in the appropriate counties (DeKalb and Fulton), allowing the mostly yes votes from the city to be tabulated against the mostly no votes from the suburban areas in the county.

== Initial construction ==
In 1971 MARTA purchased the Atlanta Transit System for $12.8 million. In 1973 the state legislature established the Metropolitan Atlanta Rapid Transit Overview Committee. In 1975 groundbreaking of the rail system took place. Also in 1975 the Urban Mass Transportation Administration offered $600 million to MARTA for a six-year period for rail transit construction.

=== East-West Line construction ===
Construction on the East Line began in 1975 and the first rail service began on June 30, 1979, between the Georgia State and Avondale stations. In June 1993, the Kensington and Indian Creek stations opened, which also marked the first time MARTA rail service went outside I-285.

The West Line opened between Hightower (now Hamilton E. Holmes) and Five Points stations, on December 22, 1979. On December 12, 1992, the Proctor Creek Branch and Bankhead Station opened. The 1979 plan for the West Line also included an additional station at Fairburn Road (later shortened to Brownlee-Boulder Park) and another station was planned at the then-existing Perry Homes housing project on the Proctor Creek Line.

=== North-South Line construction ===
On December 4, 1981, the North-South Line opened from Garnett to North Avenue, including Civic Center and the lower level of Five Points. On September 11, 1982, the line was expanded to Arts Center, and the Peachtree Center Station (whose opening was delayed from 1981) also opened. The section between Lindbergh Center and Brookhaven opened on December 15, 1984. The line reached Chamblee in 1987, and the Doraville terminus was finished in 1992. The section between Lenox and Doraville was redesignated the Northeast Line on June 8, 1996, when the North Line opened between Buckhead and Dunwoody stations, including a stretch in the Georgia 400 median. The last two North Line stations to open were Sandy Springs and North Springs, on December 16, 2000.

The Garnett station opened on December 4, 1981, and was the first South Line station to open. The section between the West End and Lakewood-Fort McPherson opened on December 15, 1984. The East Point Station opened on August 16, 1986. and the College Park and Airport Stations opened on June 18, 1988. The Airport Station however, was built in 1980 as part of the construction of Hartsfield International Airport and was unused until the line was connected in 1988.

=== Previous expansion plans ===
MARTA was built with at least three stubs for rail lines which were never built. The Northwest Line towards Cobb County has a stub tunnel east of Atlantic Station, but that redevelopment has not been built with a MARTA station in mind, and Cobb County would instead most likely get a light rail or commuter rail system (either of which have been studied) or a bus rapid transit service (see Northwest Corridor HOV/BRT). The Northwest line was cut back to a distance of two stations, and next the idea was dropped entirely.

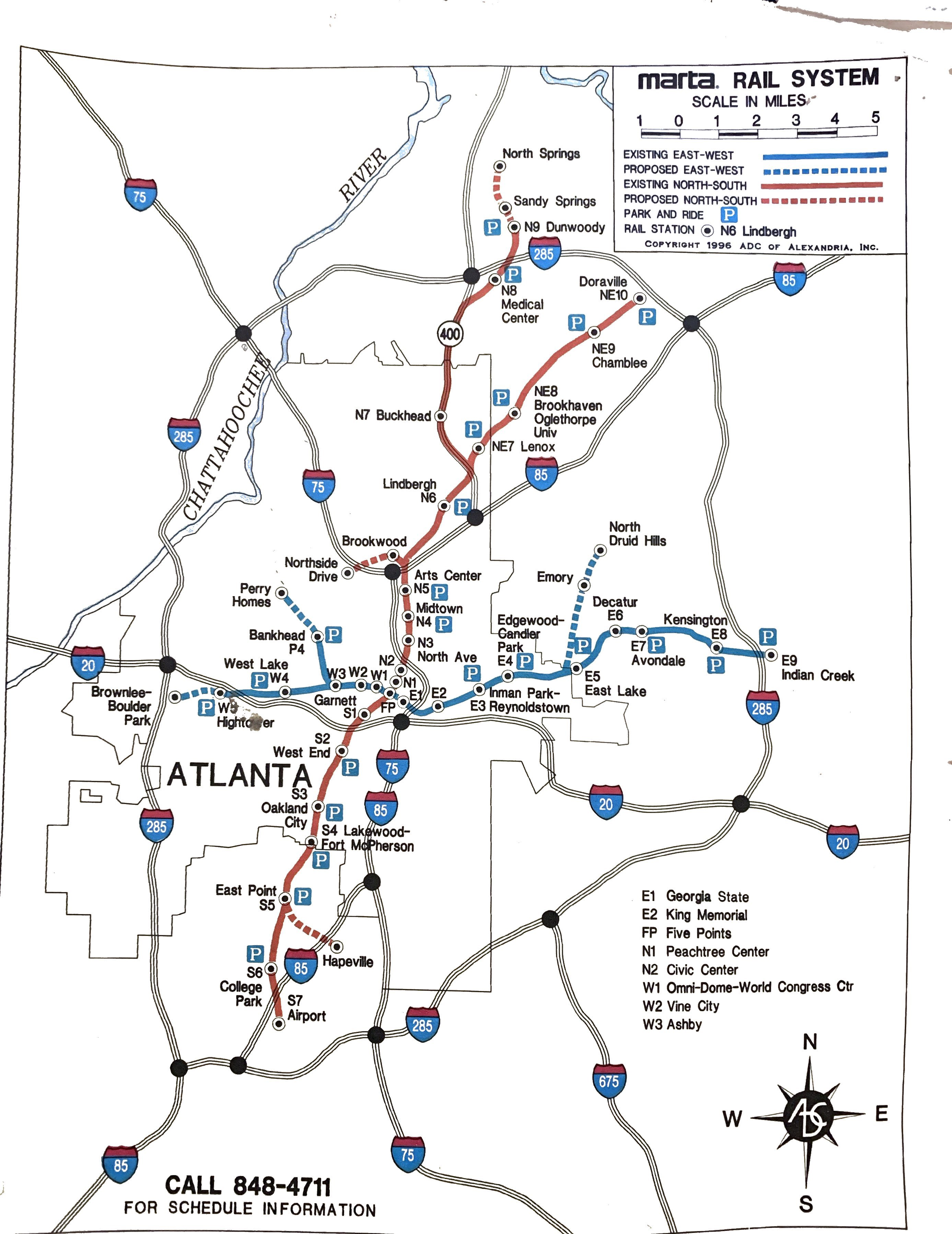
MARTA 1996 Map showing the North Line (now Red Line) extension to Dunwoody The line was extended to its current terminus At North Springs in 2000. Several cancelled rail projects are also depicted.

The South Line's branch to Hapeville was considered for extension into Clayton County as far away as Forest Park, but this idea was also cut off when the voters of that county initially refused to approve tax funding for the line. Another idea for a rail spur line spur was for an above-ground line from near the International Airport for a spur line to the town of Hapeville, but no work has ever been executed. The idea to revive expansion plans in the form of heavy rail and bus was approved to go once again before voters in November 2014 by the Clayton county commissioners in July 2014 with a 1% sales tax providing the funding for said expansion. This time, the referendum was approved and Clayton County voted to join MARTA, the system's first ever expansion outside of Fulton, Dekalb and the city of Atlanta.

Yet another proposed spur line would have branched off the Blue Line in DeKalb County, running northeast to the area of North Druid Hills, Emory University, and the town of Tucker. Now under consideration is an idea for light rail line (rather than heavy rail) from Avondale Station to Lindbergh Center, via Emory/CDC.

The Northeast Line of the rail system, which has ended in Doraville for two decades, was considered for extension into Gwinnett County as far as northeast as Norcross, but this idea was cut off when the voters of that county declined to approve sales-tax funding for it.

The Proctor Creek branch was also projected to go one more station northwestward to the West Highlands neighborhood, but no work has been done on that one either.

== Funding issues ==
From 2000–Present, there have been no active railway expansion projects in the MARTA system due to lack of additional sales-tax funding, the need to spend its limited capital budget on refurbishing its older rolling stock, replacing the fare-collection system, repairing the tracks and their electrical systems, and other long-term maintenance, repair, and operations requirements.

The split was written into MARTA legislation at its formation with the rationale that MARTA should continue expanding and investing in the system. However, the requirement began to limit the amount of service MARTA could provide. The sales tax law was amended by the state legislature in 2002 to allow a temporary three-year 45% capital/55% operations split. A 2005 bill to renew the split was tabled by the legislature's MARTA Oversight Committee, forcing MARTA to pass a new budget with cuts in service. The temporary 45%/55% capital/operations split was renewed again in the 2006 state legislative session. The capital funds surplus has resulted in projects, such as a new US$100 million Breeze Card fare collection system and US$1.1 million automatic toilets in Five Points station, occurring at the same time that MARTA was struggling to pay for bus and rail operations. In 2015, the Georgia General Assembly approved a new bill that no longer requires MARTA to split the 1% sales tax.

In 2006. internal and external audits of MARTA corporate spending revealed personal charges on a pair of MARTA credit cards used by former General Manager and CEO Nathaniel Ford and two of his secretaries. In response to the audit, Ford sent MARTA a check for $1,000 as reimbursement for the charges. An additional credit card with charges involving two of his secretaries, Iris Anthony and Stephannie Smart, was also uncovered. Smart used the cards to pay approximately $6,000 in private expenses, and subsequently agreed to repay this amount to MARTA.

=== Financial crisis ===
In early April 2009, MARTA experienced a budget crisis when the Georgia General Assembly failed to pass a bill that would allow MARTA to access its own capital reserve account, in order to compensate for a severe drop in sales-tax revenue during the late-2000s recession. MARTA stated that this could force the agency to discontinue operations one day out of the week, possibly a weekday. The agency's budget crisis forced MARTA to lay off 700 employees. Service cuts and other budget-stabilizing measures began in fiscal year 2011, with the first affected service mark-up in September 2010. Governor Sonny Perdue refused to call a special session as requested, and did not issue an executive order as he stated it would not be legal to do so.

== Current expansion plans ==
=== Atlanta BeltLine ===
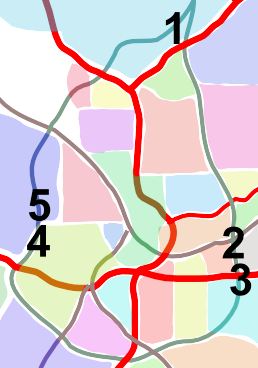
Map showing BeltLine and connected neighborhoods; numbers represent discontinuities in current rights of way

Additionally, several traffic corridors are currently being studied by MARTA for possible system expansion. The BeltLine is a current proposal for the use of light rail and possibly bus or streetcar service on existing railroad rights-of-way around Atlanta's central business districts. The conversion of existing rail right-of-way to the proposed BeltLine also calls for the creation of three additional MARTA rapid transit stations where existing lines intersect the Belt Line at Simpson Road, Hulsey Yard, and Murphy Crossing.

=== Clifton Corridor ===
Rapid transit alternatives are as of October 2011, under consideration for the Clifton Corridor, from Lindbergh Center, following the CSX rail corridor to Emory University and the Centers for Disease Control, with possible continuation along the northern edge of Decatur on to Avondale MARTA station. Bus, light rail and heavy rail rapid-transit options had been considered, with light rail being selected as the preferred option.

=== Connect 400 ===
The Georgia 400 Transit Initiative (also known as "Connect 400") is a MARTA project to study options for expanding high-capacity transit along the Georgia State Route 400 corridor into the northern reaches of Fulton county. The initiative, kicked off in December 2011, envisages an 11.9-mile extension of rapid transit service, starting in the south at North Springs Transit Station, the current terminus of the existing MARTA Red Line. From there, such an extension would continue northward through the cities of Sandy Springs, Roswell, and Alpharetta, terminating in the vicinity of Windward Parkway.

As of the fifth public meeting on the subject on September 26, 2013, the study had narrowed the field of transit technology alternatives to three, all using existing right-of-way along SR 400: heavy-rail transit (HRT, extending the Red Line northward), light-rail transit (LRT), or bus rapid transit (BRT). Early designs for all three options include stations near Northridge Road, Holcomb Bridge Road, Mansell Road, North Point Mall, and Windward Parkway; initial sketches of the LRT and BRT options also include a station near Old Milton Parkway.

As of June 2015, the project is moving into the Environmental Impact study stage of the planning process. According to MARTA Representatives at the April 2015 meetings, the expansion could open in 2025 at the earliest assuming a best-case scenario. Federal funding is still not approved; the Environmental Impact study must be complete. By the April 2015 meeting, the LRT option has been discarded. The HRT option has been approved as the Locally Preferred Alternative, though two BRT options exist - one that would run in a dedicated bus guideway and the other to integrate with Georgia DOT's planned work for the corridor. The GDOT integrated option would include sharing normal traffic lanes at least in some parts of the route. The plans for stations at Mansell Rd. and Haynes Bridge Rd. have been merged into one station at North Point Mall.

=== Proposed new infill stations ===
Adding another station to the existing line near Armour Yard (MARTA's main railyard, opened 2005) has also been discussed, as the Red and Gold MARTA lines, the northeast BeltLine light rail, proposed commuter rail lines to points northeast such as Athens (the "Brain Train") and Gainesville, would all pass through Armour Yard. Other stations that have been proposed are; Mechanicsville, Boone, Murphy Crossing, and Krog.

The proposed Atlanta Multimodal Passenger Terminal (MMPT) would be built next to Five Points station, connecting MARTA to surface passenger rail, including commuter rail, future intercity rail, Amtrak, and possible high-speed rail on the Southeast Corridor.

Additional expansion plans for MARTA and other metro Atlanta transportation agencies are detailed in Mobility 2030 a timeline by the Atlanta Regional Commission for improving transit through the year 2030.

== Expansion plans and recent history ==
=== 2010s ===
On September 27, 2010, MARTA opened a bus rapid transit line along Memorial Drive from Kensington Station to the Goldsmith Road MARTA park and ride lot in Stone Mountain and Ponce De Leon Avenue. The bus had two routes: The Q Express ran between Kensington Station the park-and-ride lot with only two intermediate stops at North Hairston Road and again at Georgia Perimeter College. The Q Limited branched off at North Hairston Road on the way to East Ponce de Leon Avenue and had six stops. Express service was discontinued in 2013 due to low ridership.

On July 5, 2014, the Clayton County Board of Commissioners approved a contract with MARTA to extend service to the county, financed by a 1 percent sales tax. Fulton and DeKalb county leaders approved the expansion. On November 4, 2014, Clayton County residents approved the 1% sales tax to join MARTA. Bus service began in March 2015. The contract also includes provisions for future rail transit to the county by 2025. In 2018, commuter rail was selected as the locally preferred alternative of transit mode along the corridor. Increased costs and lack of participation from the railroad led to the project's cancellation in 2021. MARTA chose to explore other transportation options to the county.

In November 2016, Gwinnett and Fulton voters approved a half cent sales tax increase for expanding service. When the Interstate 85 Bridge collapsed MARTA announced an extension of service in response to the incident. CEO Keith Parker reported ridership spiked by 25% the day following the collapse.

In November 2016, 71% of Atlanta voters approved a half-penny sales tax increase to fund "More MARTA" projects, projected to raise $2.7 billion over 40 years, in order to significantly expand MARTA by constructing additional bus rapid transit and light rail lines, and multiple and infill stations. In October 2018, MARTA's board approved and allocated funding towards a comprehensive list of "More MARTA" projects, including 29 miles of light rail transit (LRT), 13 miles of bus rapid transit (BRT), arterial rapid transit (ART), transit centers and 15 MARTA stations:

1. Beltline Northeast LRT
2. Beltline Northwest LRT
3. Beltline Southwest LRT
4. Beltline Southeast LRT
5. Campbellton Rd LRT
6. Clifton Corridor LRT
7. Atlanta Streetcar Downtown East Extension
8. Atlanta Streetcar Downtown West Extension
9. Capitol Ave BRT
10. North Ave-Hollowell Parkway BRT
11. Northside Drive BRT
12. Peachtree Road BRT
13. Cleveland Ave ART
14. Metropolitan Parkway ART
15. Greenbriar Transit Center
16. Moores Mill Transit Center

In January 2018 the state legislature introduced House Bill 930 which created the Atlanta Transit Link Authority (similar to the MTA in New York), the bill allows 13 metro Atlanta counties to raise sales tax by 1 cent for transit expansion if voters approve, on May 3, 2018, Governor Nathan Deal signed the bill into law.

In June 2018, MARTA agreed to take control and ownership of the Atlanta Streetcar and made plans to integrate the route into a larger light rail system.

==== Gwinnett County ====
In September 2018, MARTA's board of directors and the Gwinnett County Board of Commissioners gave conditional approval to an agreement that would see MARTA assume, and significantly expand, operations of Gwinnett's bus system (in operation since 2001) and clear the way for the long-sought-after extension of MARTA's rail system into the county from its current terminus at Doraville. The population of Gwinnett County has significantly increased, and become more racially and ethnically diverse, since 1990, the last time the county rejected joining MARTA. Whereas white business elites were the initial demographic to support the MARTA in 1965, most black voters had voted to fund transit. Large communities of rural white Georgians opposed MARTA.

The original plan in 2018 included a plan to expand heavy rail rapid transit in Gwinnett County and purchase more buses, which was enabled by legislation permitted counties to raise taxes to fund transit, which before was not allowed. The contract with MARTA would go into effect only if a public vote, that was scheduled for March 19, 2019, succeeded. The agreement called for a new one-cent sales tax that would be collected in Gwinnett County until 2057. On March 19, 2019, the third transit referendum failed, with 54.32% of the vote being "No" to expand. A fourth transit referendum was added to the ballot during the 2020 presidential election, which failed by a margin of slightly more than 1,000 voters as 50.13% of voters chose to vote against the referendum.

=== 2020s ===
During the COVID-19 pandemic, MARTA suspended several bus routes in an effort to promote social distancing on the busier routes. As of April 24, 2021, all suspended bus routes have been restored. MARTA also eliminated fares on buses in March 2020, but reinstated them in September 2020.

In April 2021 the Georgia state government finally announced funding towards MARTA. Announced as part of the state spending plan MARTA is set to receive $6 million towards the rehabilitation of Bankhead station which will serve the site of the planned Microsoft campus.

In March 2023, MARTA significantly scaled back its list of projects prioritized for delivery by 2028, to six transit lines and the renovation and construction of 3 transit stations. Among those prioritized projects included the Summerhill, Campbellton, and Clifton Corridor BRTs, the Atlanta Streetcar Downtown East Extension to Ponce City Market, reconstruction of Five Points station, and a platform extension at Bankhead station. Other projects, including Beltline LRT at other corridors, transit centers, and the Streetcar Downtown West Extension, were deprioritized. In response to the announcement, the Atlanta City Council unanimously approved an independent audit of More MARTA's program revenues and expenditures. MARTA has been criticized for slow progress on its More MARTA expansion, rising costs, and ongoing delays.

In June 2023, MARTA selected a designer to extend the Atlanta Streetcar to the Beltline. Construction of the $230 million extension was set to begin in 2025. In March 2025, Atlanta mayor Andre Dickens withdrew his support from the Streetcar East Extension, and reprioritized a streetcar extension into the Southside corridor instead. Various lobbying groups, including Better Atlanta Transit had lobbied against this extension, while advocates of Beltline transit, including Beltline Rail Now criticized the late-breaking decision.

In March 2024, Mayor Andre Dickens announced that four new infill stations would be constructed across the network, including at Murphy Crossing – intersecting with the Beltline – as well as at Krog Street, Joseph E. Boone, and Armour Yards.

In June 2024, MARTA began construction on the Summerhill BRT, MARTA's first new transit line in 2 decades and Atlanta's first BRT line. The $91 million project was projected to be complete in spring 2025. The 5-mile (8-kilometer) line will run from downtown Atlanta, through Summerhill, and end at the Atlanta Beltline. The line, named the "MARTA Rapid A-Line", will utilize new 60 ft (18 m) articulated electric buses. In April 2025, completion of construction was delayed to 2026, due to construction issues.

In July 2024, MARTA paused a $230 million renovation project of Five Points station, due to opposition from the Atlanta City Council and mayor, due to the project's impact to pedestrians and bus service. In April 2025, MARTA announced plans to resume the renovation project in preparation for the 2026 World Cup.

In August 2024, a city audit found that $70 million of the More MARTA capital fund intended for capital projects, had been siphoned to cover MARTA operational expenses. The audit also found that the sales tax had raised $493 million in More MARTA funding from fiscal years 2017 to 2023, while $69 million had been spent during that time period. In March 2025, MARTA disputed the audit findings, citing that another audit that found MARTA owed only $865,000 to the More MARTA capital fund.

== Fare history ==
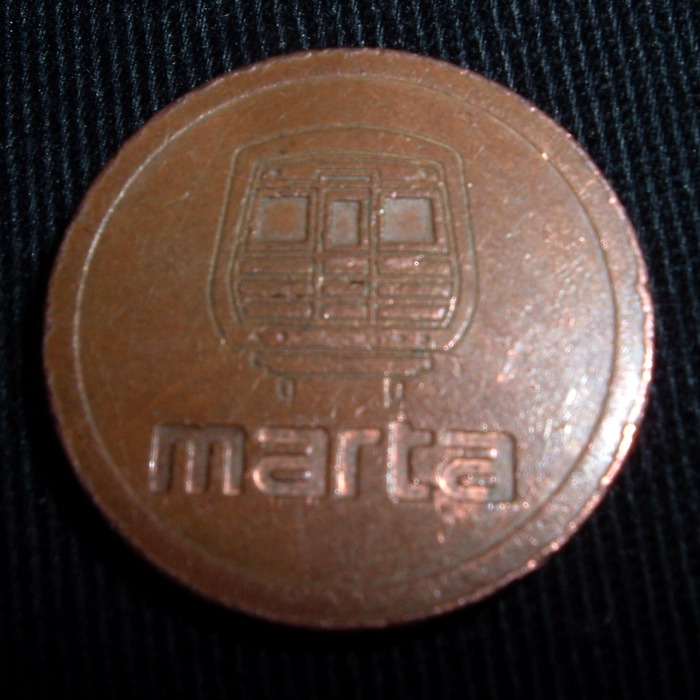
A MARTA single one-way fare token; tokens have since been replaced by the Breeze Card

Below is the history of single one-way fares on MARTA:

- 1972: MARTA purchases the Atlanta Transit Company and reduces bus fare from US$0.40 to US$0.15.
- 1979: MARTA raises the fare to US$0.25
- 1980: MARTA raises the fare to US$0.50
- 1981: MARTA raises the fare to US$0.60
- 1987: MARTA raises the fare to US$0.75
- 1989: MARTA raises the fare to US$0.85
- 1990: MARTA raises the fare to US$1.00
- 1992: MARTA raises the fare to US$1.25
- 1996: MARTA raises the fare to US$1.50
- 2000: MARTA raises the fare to US$1.75
- 2006: MARTA completes transition from token and cash fare collection to Breeze Card smart-card system; fare remains US$1.75
- 2009: Fare is raised to $2.00 when the state legislature fails to allow MARTA to spend its own capital money on operations.
- 2011: Fare is raised to $2.50

== Major incidents ==
On February 25, 2000, a MARTA worker was killed and another was injured while inspecting tracks near Avondale station.

On April 10, 2000, two MARTA contract workers repairing the ceiling of MARTA's Lenox station were killed when an unscheduled MARTA train struck the bucket of the self-propelled lift they were in. As a result, the Georgia Department of Transportation audited MARTA operations and enforced changes to rule compliance by MARTA employees.

On October 15, 2011, 19-year-old Joetavius Stafford was killed by a MARTA police officer at the Vine City station. MARTA claims that Stafford was armed while his brother said he was unarmed. After a full investigation, there was evidence that Stafford was armed and the officer was cleared.

On June 3, 2018, a MARTA contractor died after his vehicle was struck by a Red Line train; he was working on the tracks between Buckhead and North Springs stations.

On January 14, 2022, MARTA CEO Jeffrey Parker committed suicide by stepping in front of a moving train at the East Lake station.

== See also ==
- Timeline of mass transit in Atlanta
