= Perimeter (disambiguation) =

The perimeter is the distance around a given two-dimensional object.

Perimeter may also refer to:

- Perimeter Aviation, an airline
- Perimeter fence, the demarcation of a perimeter, when the protection of assets, personnel or buildings is required
- Perimeter Institute for Theoretical Physics, an independent research centre in foundational theoretical physics

== Places ==
- Interstate 285 (Georgia) ("The Perimeter"), an Interstate Highway loop encircling Atlanta, Georgia
- Perimeter Center, a major edge city in metro Atlanta, Georgia, United States
- Perimeter Mall, an upscale shopping mall in Dunwoody, Georgia

== Technology ==
- Dead Hand (also Russian: Система «Периметр», lit. '"Perimeter" System'), a Cold War-era automatic nuclear weapons-control system used by the Soviet Union
- Perimeter (video game), a real-time strategy video game developed by Russian studio K-D Lab for Microsoft Windows
- Visual field test (also perimeter), an eye examination that can detect dysfunction in central and peripheral vision

== See also ==
- Perimeter Highway (disambiguation)
