= Medical Center station (MARTA) =

MARTA rail station

N8 Medical Center
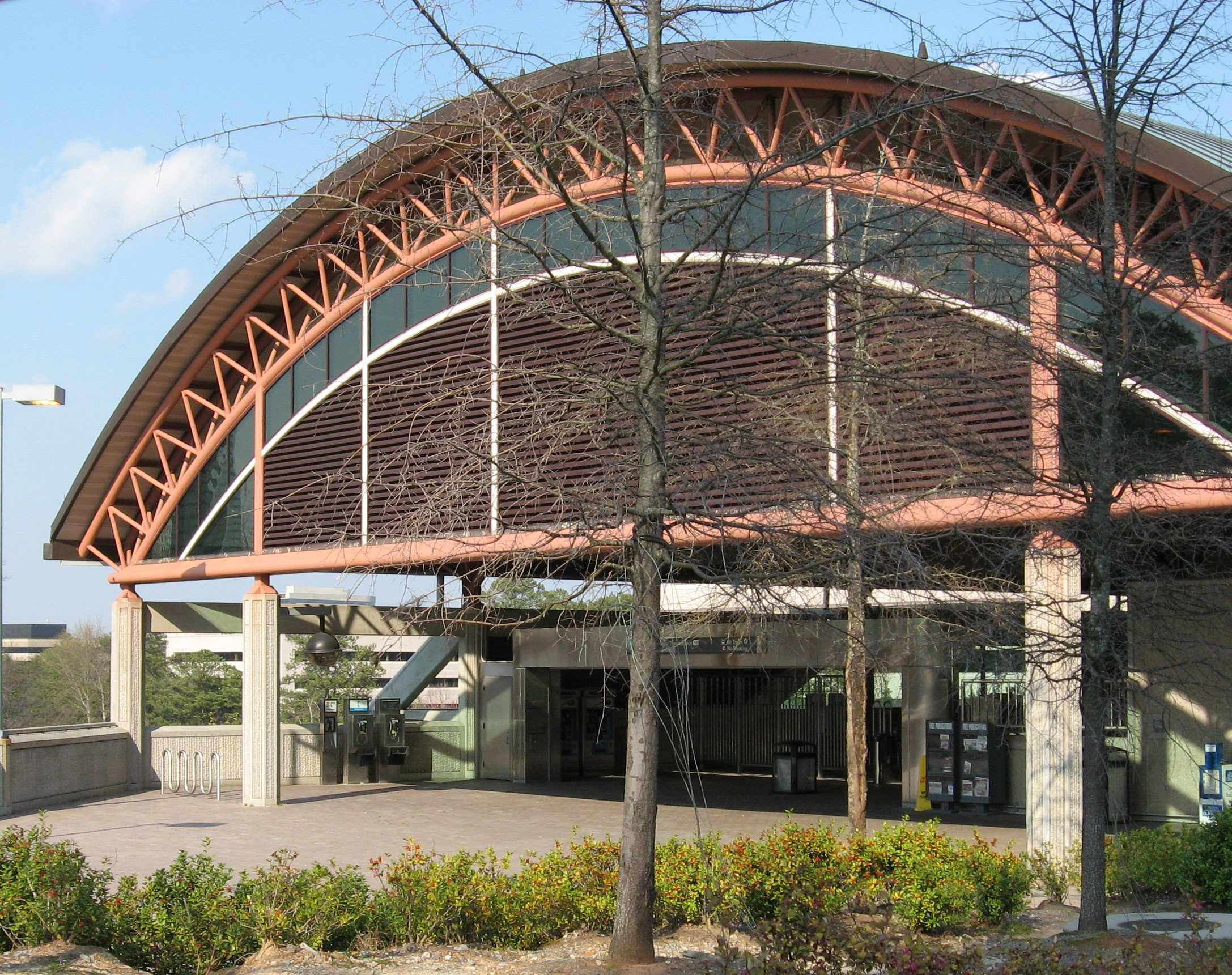

General information
- Location: 5711 Peachtree-Dunwoody Road; Sandy Springs, Georgia 30342
- Coordinates: 33.910689°N 84.352684°W
- Platforms: 2 side platforms
- Tracks: 2
- Connections: MARTA Bus: 825, PTC shuttles

Construction
- Structure type: At-grade
- Parking: 200 spaces; daily parking only Long-term parking prohibited
- Cycle facilities: 6 spaces
- Accessible: YES
- Architect: Diedrich Architects & Associates, Inc.

Other information
- Station code: N8

History
- Opened: June 8, 1996; 30 years ago

Passengers
- 2013: 1,629 (avg. weekday) 0%

Services
Preceding station	MARTA	Following station
Buckhead toward Lindbergh Center	Red Line Nighttime Service	Dunwoody toward North Springs
Buckhead toward Airport	Red Line	Dunwoody toward North Springs
Location

Medical Center is an at-grade subway station in Sandy Springs, Georgia, United States, serving the Red Line of the Metropolitan Atlanta Rapid Transit Authority (MARTA) rail system. It serves the Pill Hill neighborhood of Perimeter Center, the location of Northside Hospital Atlanta (the country's busiest birthplace), St. Joseph's Hospital, and Children's Healthcare of Atlanta at Scottish Rite and DeVry University. North of Medical Center is Dunwoody station and south is Buckhead station. This station's platforms are long enough to accommodate 8-car trains.

The station is located just west of the Fulton/DeKalb County line. The portion in DeKalb County is currently not developed and is a part of MARTA's portfolio for potential transit-oriented development. Of note, the station was constructed in 1996 when this portion of Fulton County was unincorporated; Sandy Springs was incorporated ten years later.

== Station layout ==
G	Street Level	Entrance/Exit, station house
P Platform level	Side platform, doors will open on the right
P Platform level	Southbound	← Red Line toward Airport (nights toward Lindbergh Center) (Buckhead)
P Platform level	Northbound	Red Line toward North Springs (Dunwoody) →
P Platform level	Side platform, doors will open on the right

== Parking ==
Medical Center has 200 daily parking spaces available for MARTA users, which are located at the lower level of St. Joseph's parking deck. Daily parking (less than 24 hours) is free; long-term parking is prohibited, as the hospital is closed to visitors at night. In order to limit parking to MARTA users, the parking ticket must be validated inside of the fare gate area to exit the parking deck.

== Landmarks and popular destinations ==
- Children's Healthcare of Atlanta at Scottish Rite
- DeVry University
- Embassy Row
- Emory Saint Joseph's Hospital
- Northside Hospital Atlanta
- Perimeter Center business district

== Bus routes ==
The station is served by the following MARTA bus routes:

- Route 825 - Johnson Ferry Road

== Gallery ==
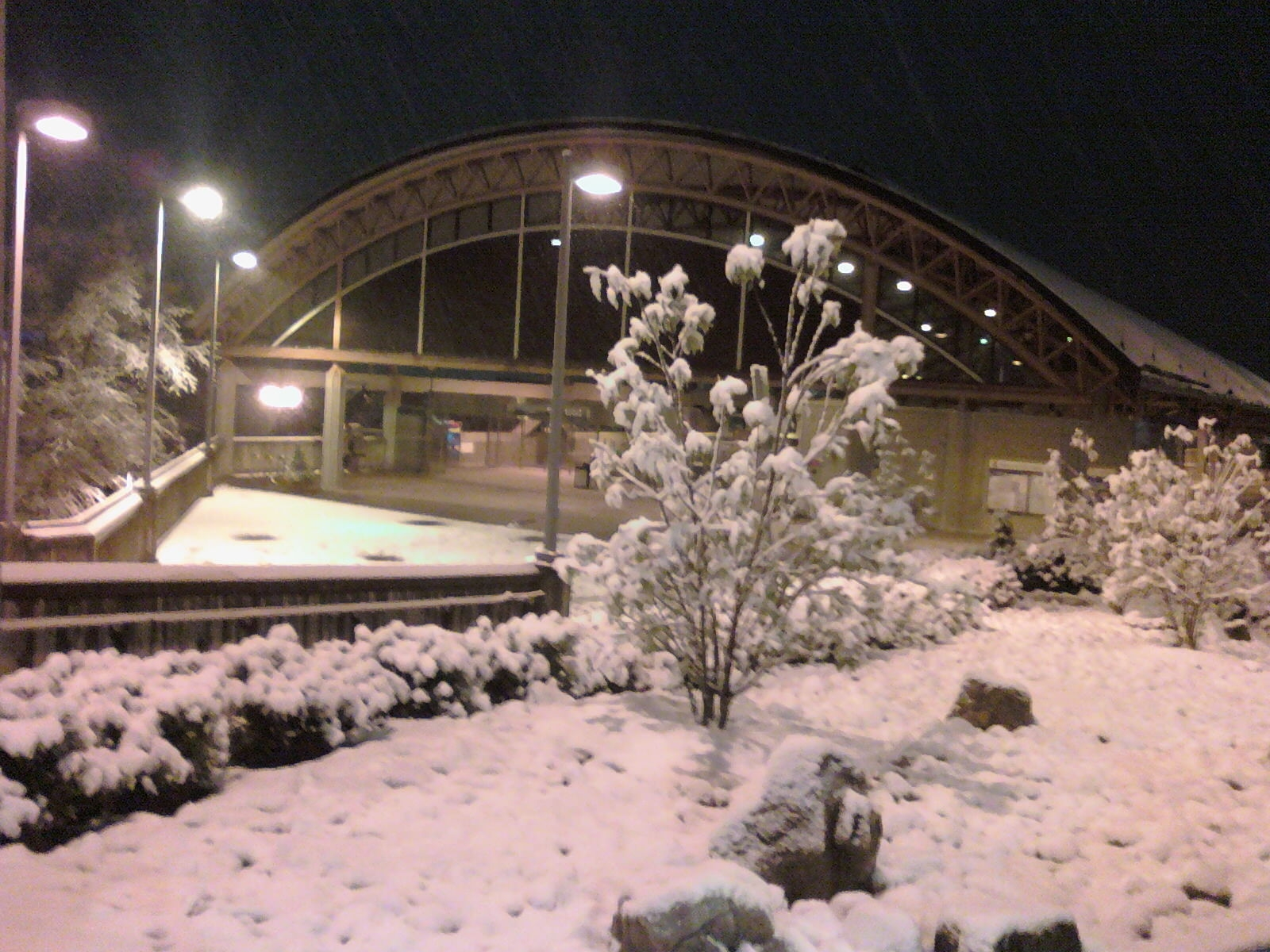
Medical Center Station in the snow

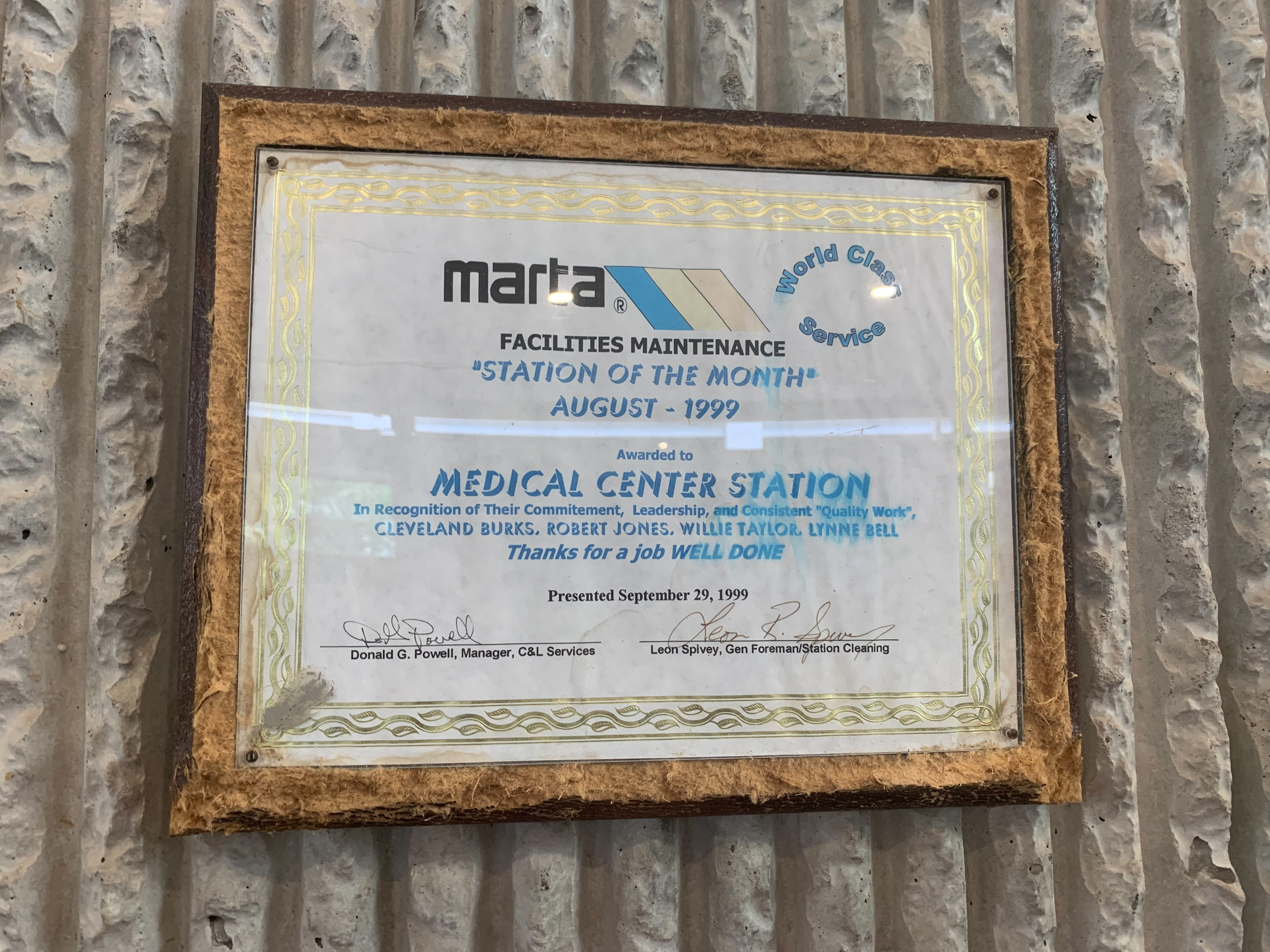
Medical Center Award for Station of the Month for August 1999

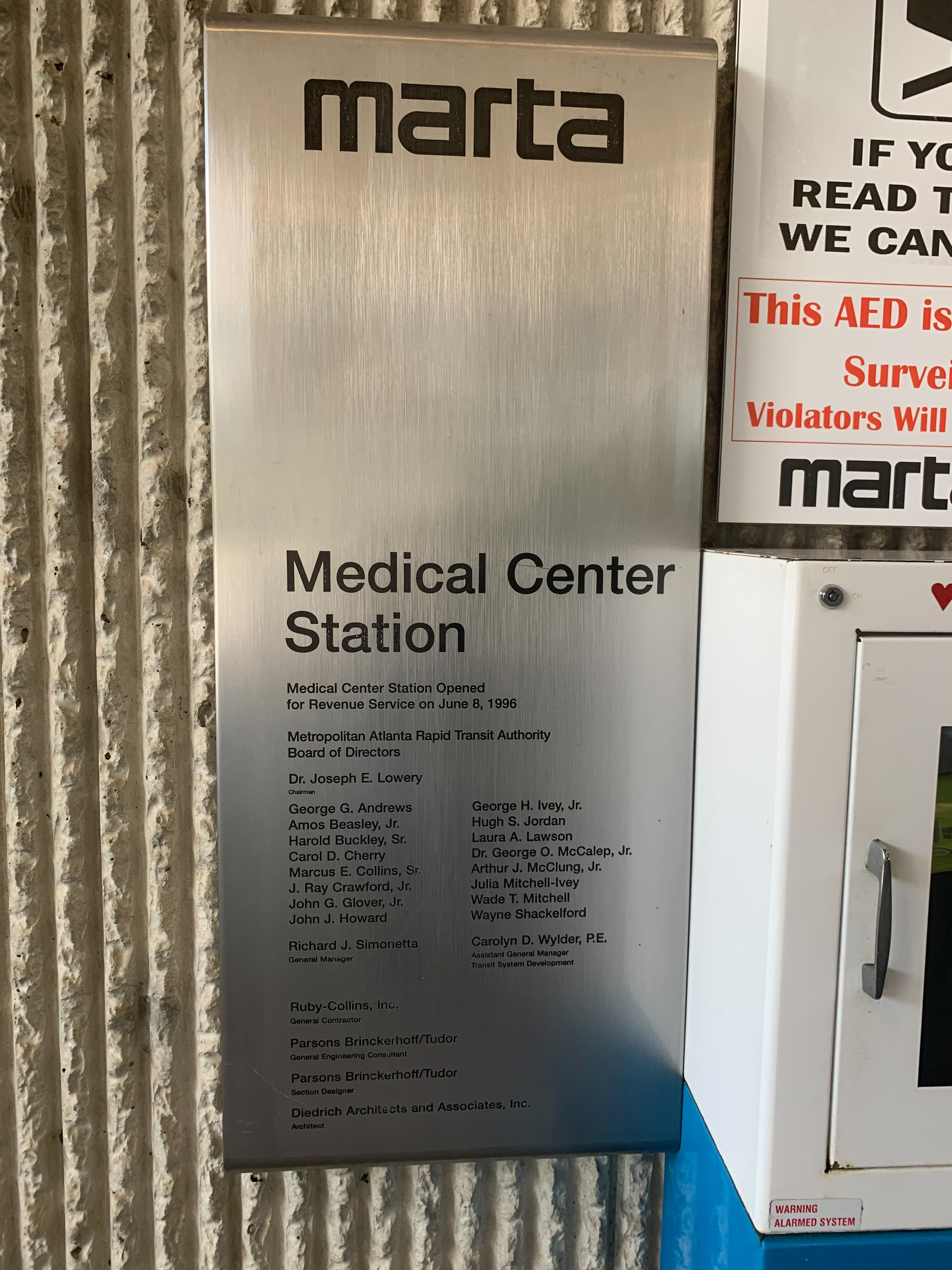
This plaque commemorates the construction of Medical Center Station

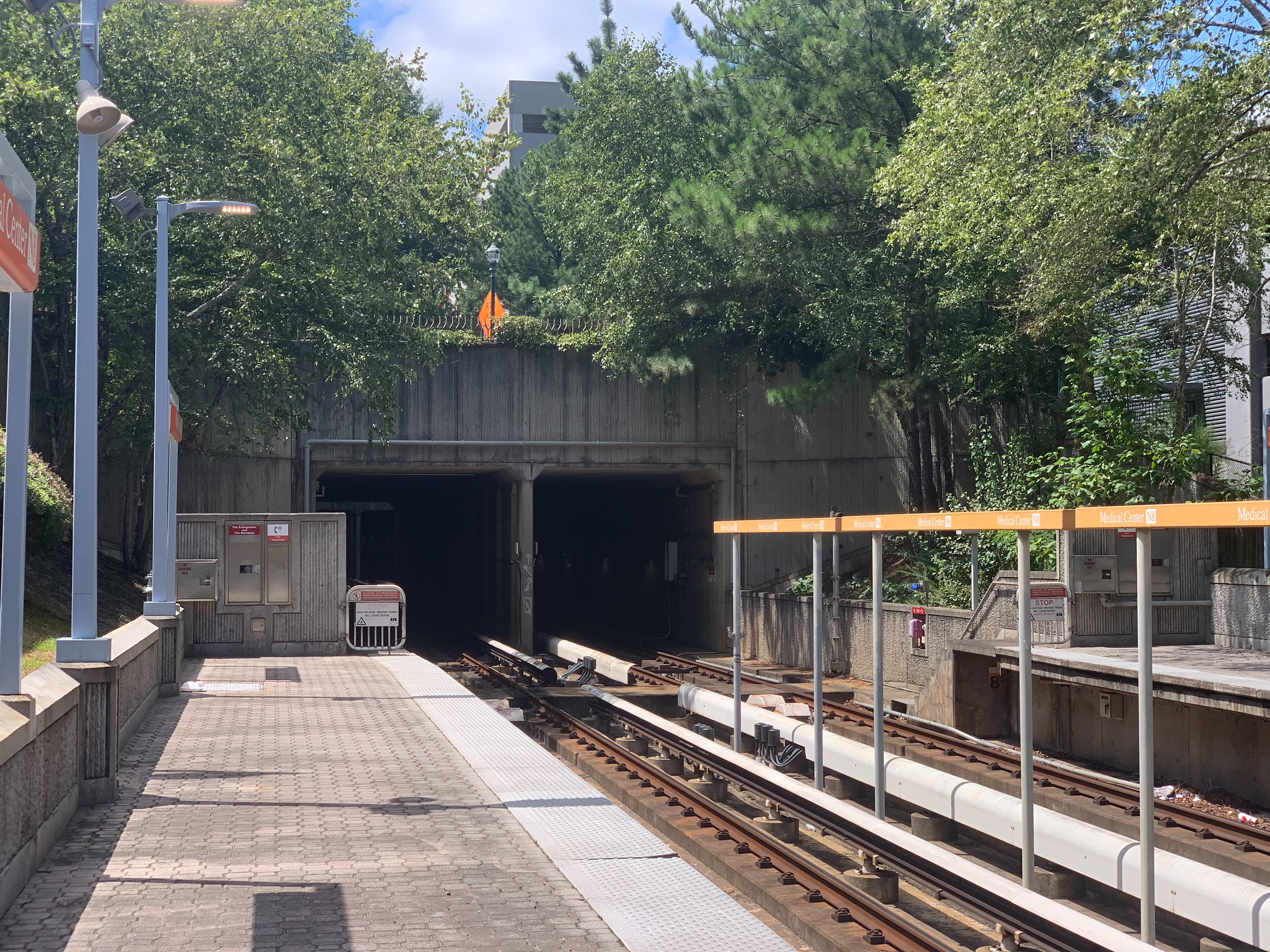
Medical Center Tracks and Platforms
