= Sandy Springs station =

MARTA rail station

N10 Sandy Springs
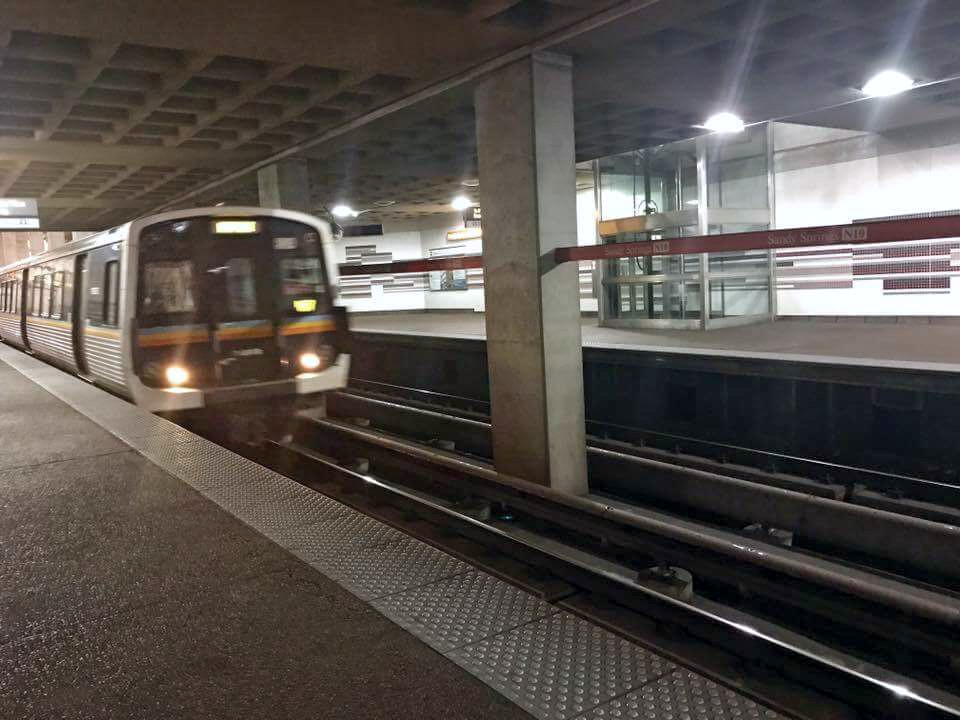
- A southbound Red Line train arrives at Sandy Springs station.

General information
- Location: 1101 Mount Vernon Highway; Sandy Springs, Georgia 30338
- Coordinates: 33.933035°N 84.352019°W
- Platforms: 2 side platforms
- Tracks: 2
- Connections: MARTA Bus: 148, GRTA, PTC shuttles

Construction
- Structure type: Underground
- Parking: 1,170 spaces
- Cycle facilities: 12 spaces
- Accessible: YES
- Architect: Lord, Aeck & Sargent

Other information
- Station code: N10

History
- Opened: December 16, 2000; 25 years ago

Passengers
- 2013: 2,322 (avg. weekday) ▲2%

Services
| Preceding station | MARTA | Following station |
|---|---|---|
| Dunwoody toward Lindbergh Center | Red Line Nighttime Service | North Springs Terminus |
| Dunwoody toward Airport | Red Line | North Springs Terminus |
Location

Sandy Springs is an underground subway station in Sandy Springs, Georgia, on the Red Line of the Metropolitan Atlanta Rapid Transit Authority (MARTA) rail system. Points of interest near this station includes the Perimeter Center area, which includes high-rise office parks near GA-400 and Perimeter Mall. The station lies entirely within the city of Sandy Springs, Georgia which was incorporated in December, 2005, while the station was opened December 16, 2000. The station includes a pedestrian tunnel under Abernathy Road providing direct access to North Park and WestRock business parks. The parking deck is expandable to seven stories, though only six have been completed. The station also features knockout panels built into the concourse level to allow for privately built underground entrances to future developments. The station also features colored paneling, with red colored artwork on the northbound platform, and green colored artwork on the southbound platform, making it easier for customers to distinguish what platform they are on.

The Art Institute of Atlanta, American Intercontinental University, United Parcel Service (UPS World Headquarters), North Park business park, Embassy Row business park, the Atlanta Georgia Temple of the Church of Jesus Christ of Latter-day Saints, and the Cox Communications headquarters are all located within walking distance or shuttle distance of the station.

It is adjacent to a large shopping complex that includes a multiplex movie theater, the only MARTA station to have one so close.

== Station layout ==
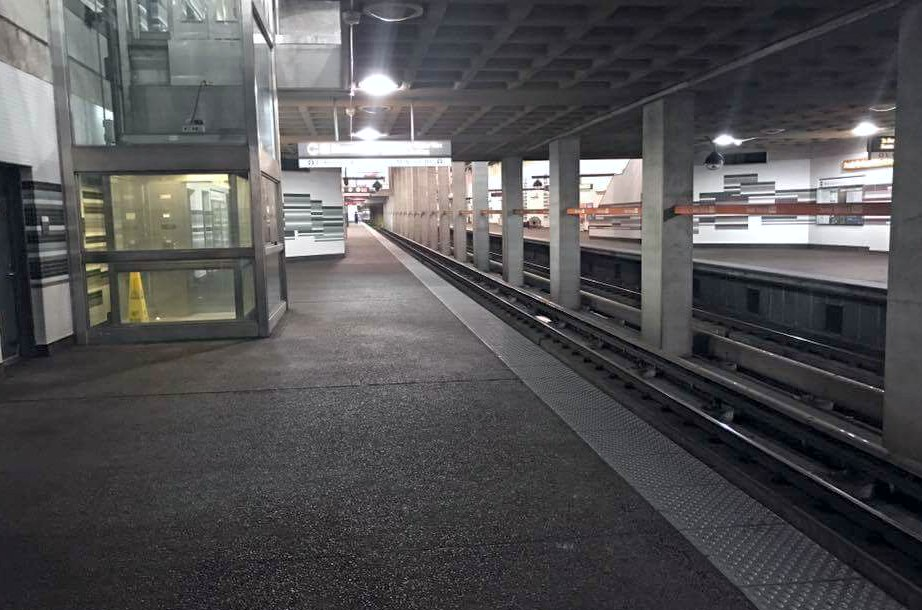
Platform level at Sandy Springs

| G | Street Level | Exit/Entrance, station house |
| P Platform level | Side platform, doors will open on the right |
| P Platform level | Southbound | ← Red Line toward Airport (nights toward Lindbergh Center) (Dunwoody) |
| P Platform level | Northbound | Red Line toward North Springs (Terminus) → |
| P Platform level | Side platform, doors will open on the right |

=== Parking ===
Sandy Springs has 1,170 daily and long-term parking spaces available for MARTA users which are located in one parking deck. Parking entrances are located at Perimeter Center West, and one from the Perimeter Shopping Center parking lot.

== Bus service ==
The station is served by the following MARTA bus routes:

- Route 148 - Mount Vernon Highway

== Gallery ==
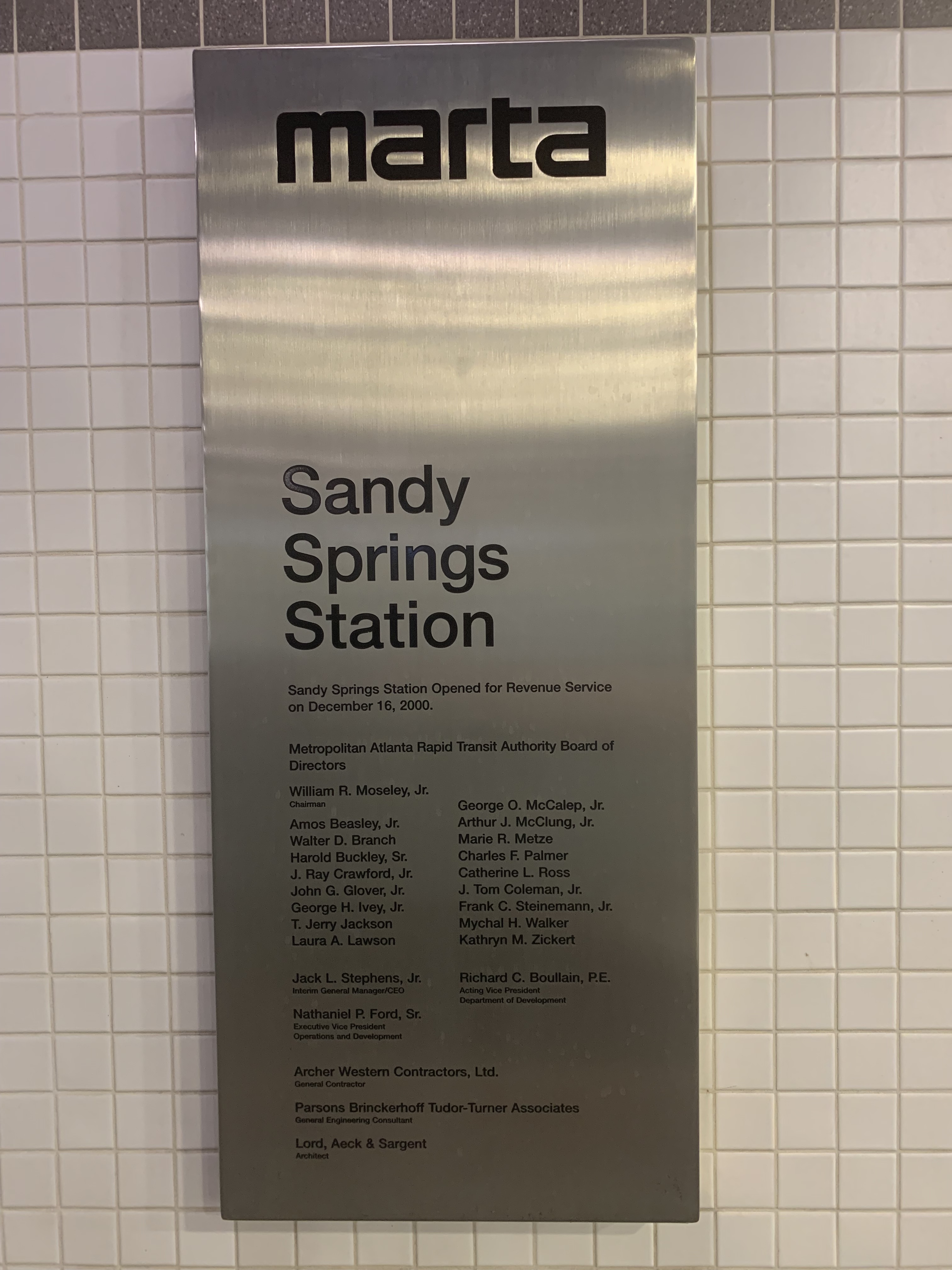
This plaque commemorates the construction of Sandy Springs Station
