= Perimeter Center =

Perimeter
- Community
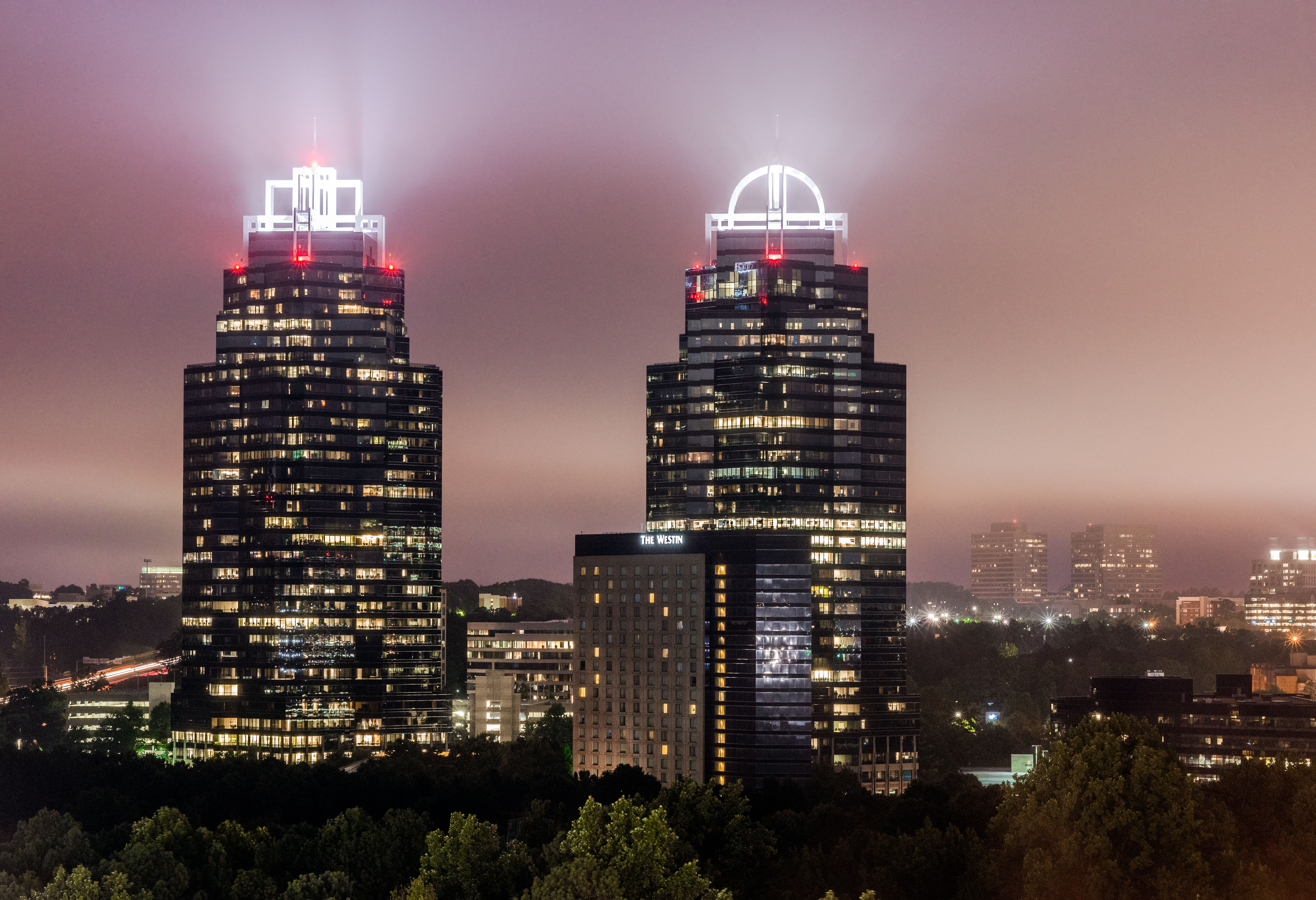
- The Perimeter skyline as seen from Brookhaven
- Nickname: Perimeter
- Motto: Where it all works.
- Interactive map of Perimeter
- Coordinates: 33.918308°N 84.352536°W
- Time zone: UTC-5 (EST)
  - Summer (DST): UTC-4 (EDT)
- Postal codes: 30346 (30338, 30328, 30319)
- Website: perimeteratl.com

Perimeter is a major edge city in metro Atlanta, Georgia, United States. It is centered on Perimeter Mall, the nucleus around which it has formed. Perimeter is located north of Atlanta proper, and lies within three cities: Dunwoody, Sandy Springs, and Brookhaven. It is one of metro Atlanta's largest business districts, and one of the largest edge cities in the United States, comprising over 29 million square feet (2,700,000 m^{2}) of office space, 6 million square feet (560,000 m^{2}) of retail space, and 40,000 residents.

== History ==
Like many edge cities, Perimeter was farmland until the late 1960s. In 1970, Taylor & Mathis and financial partner MetLife began development of Perimeter in north Atlanta. Over the next 25 years, Perimeter evolved into one of the largest and most successful master-planned office and mixed-use developments in the U.S. At Perimeter, Taylor & Mathis developed 31 office buildings containing 3,240,300 SF as well as Park Place, a 61,830 SF boutique shopping center, on 275 acres of the original assemblage of 510 acres. In addition, Taylor & Mathis ground leased 20 acres in the park for various commercial uses, including branch banks, hotels and free-standing restaurants. Approximately 100 acres was sold to The Rouse Company in 1971 for the development of the 1.3 million SF Perimeter Mall, and the balance of the land was sold over the years to corporate users for the development of eight owner-occupied office buildings totaling another 820,000 SF. In 1971, Perimeter Mall opened, constructed on a former cow pasture and debuting as the seventh regional mall in metro Atlanta. Perimeter Mall was named after the 64-mile (103 km) long Interstate 285 which circles Atlanta’s perimeter, and at one time was the edge of Atlanta’s suburban extent.

Since the opening of the mall just a few years after the freeway, Perimeter was developed though office parks constructed adjacent to the mall, including the Ravinia and Concourse complexes in the 1980s. A long-fought southward extension of Georgia 400 in 1993 provided a direct highway link to Buckhead. A MARTA train connection was established with the opening of the Dunwoody and Medical Center stations in 1996, and the Sandy Springs and North Springs stations in 2000.

Perimeter was a focal point for the incorporation of Sandy Springs in 2005 and Dunwoody in 2008, with Brookhaven incorporating the remainder (southward from the Dunwoody city limit at I-285) in 2012. While DeKalb County threatened to sue Dunwoody over the inclusion of Perimeter and its large tax base in the new city, the lawsuit never came to fruition.

== Government ==
Perimeter spans two counties, DeKalb to the east and Fulton to the west, with the county line running straight north and south just a few hundred yards or meters to the west of the mall. This line also demarcates the city of Sandy Springs to the west from the cities of Brookhaven and Dunwoody to the east. The Perimeter Community Improvement Districts (CIDs) is made up of two separate self-taxing community improvement districts, set-up by the two counties to improve the area. While legally separate, they work together as a single entity.

The core of Perimeter has its own ZIP code, 30346, which covers the southwest corner of Dunwoody. To the north and east, the remainder of the city is 30338, with 30328 to the west for most of Sandy Springs, and 30319 to the south for nearly all of Brookhaven. Their boundaries with 30346 follow the mutual city limits at the county line and I-285, respectively.

Because incorporation occurred well after the establishment of the codes, all four still default to "Atlanta" when doing a reverse lookup. However, USPS systems now consider the correct city names to be acceptable, and "Sandy Springs" acceptable for all except 30346. Addresses in all of Fulton and most of DeKalb, including all of Perimeter, are based on an origin at Five Points in downtown Atlanta, so the jurisdictional split through the district does not cause numbering discontinuities in street addresses. Despite being common throughout the rest of the metro area, the only major street to change names is Abernathy Road in Fulton, now named Perimeter Center West in DeKalb.

In 1995, Perimeter left area code 404 along with all other telephone exchanges roughly outside I-285, joining area code 770, with newer numbers being area code 678 or most recently 470. All three cities (plus Johns Creek) route emergency calls to 9-1-1 to a common public-safety answering point operated by ChatComm, which then dispatches the appropriate city or county emergency services based on the location.

== Cityscape ==
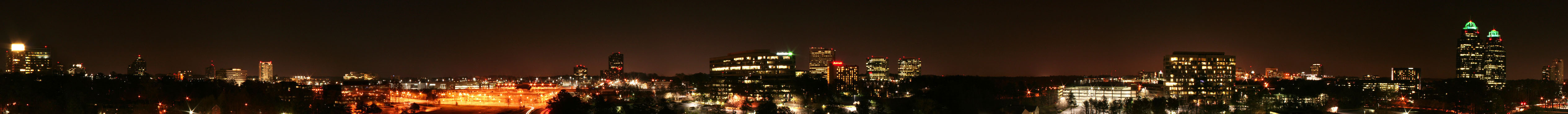
The Perimeter Center skyline including Dunwoody (center) and Sandy Springs (left and right).

The area is home not only to the strip malls that are typically built near major indoor malls, but also many office parks that contain high-rise office buildings, including skyscrapers that house the world headquarters of United Parcel Service (UPS), AT&T Mobility, Cox Enterprises, Haverty's and Newell Rubbermaid.

The King and Queen Towers, formally known as Concourse at Landmark Center, are the most recognizable structures due to the artistic structures that top them. Perimeter Place, a shopping area that emulates a town center rather than a typical strip mall, contains the Manhattan, Perimeter's first high-rise condominium tower.

== Pill Hill ==
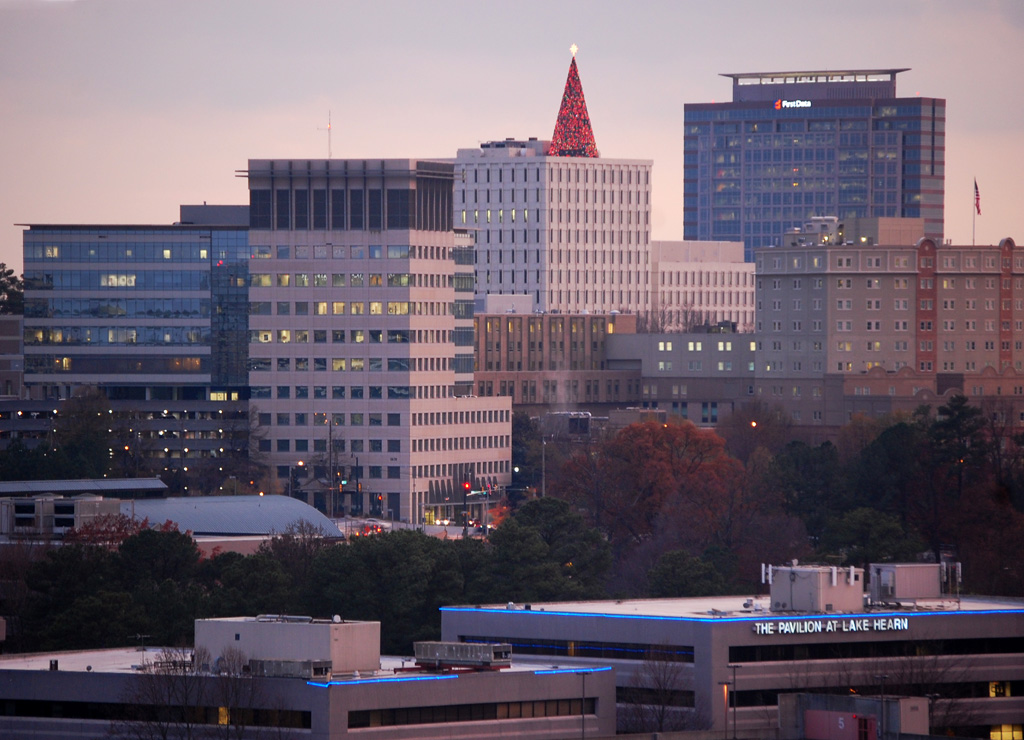
The skyline of Pill Hill

Pill Hill—nicknamed for its cluster of hospitals and doctors’ offices—is located near the intersection of Georgia 400 and Interstate 285, on the Sandy Springs side of Perimeter. Pill Hill has become the health-care mecca of Atlanta, with three hospitals, hundreds of physician practices, multiple outpatient centers and support services making it a premier location for medical practices. Pill Hill has grown exponentially since it began taking shape in the late 1960s when Scottish Rite, which was previously a children’s convalescent home, expanded into a full-fledged medical center in 1965. Northside Hospital became the first major medical provider to build on Pill Hill in 1970, and Saint Joseph’s Hospital was built soon after. The area has seen a major transformation over the past 40 years, as Northside has grown from 250 beds to 537 beds, while Saint Joseph’s completed a 64-bed expansion in 2005 to bring it to a total of 410 beds. MARTA serves the district through the Medical Center station.

== Transportation ==
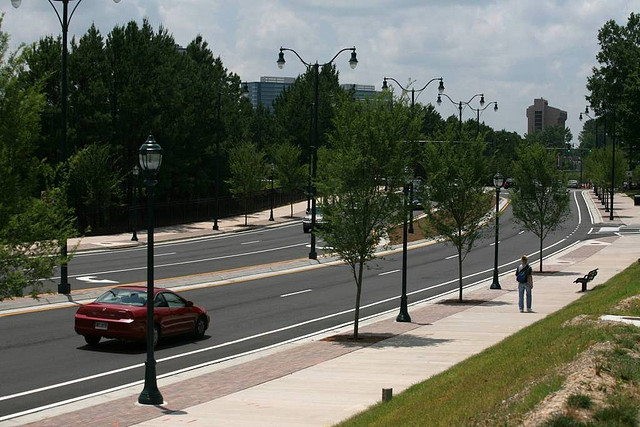
Perimeter Parkway

Perimeter is located at the interchange of two major freeways: the north/south Georgia 400, and the "top end" of the Interstate 285 beltway, "the Perimeter" for which the Mall and the area around it were named.

Perimeter is connected to Buckhead, Midtown and downtown Atlanta via MARTA. MARTA's Red Line has three stations in the area: Dunwoody in DeKalb County, which services Perimeter Mall, Sandy Springs station in Fulton County, located under one of the busiest intersections in the area, and the line's northern terminus at North Springs, servicing Georgia 400. A further extension that has been studied but not planned is up the 400 corridor to Alpharetta, the location of another edge city about 10 miles (16 km) or 16 kilometers to the north-northeast. The Atlanta Regional Commission has this in long-term plans, along with an east/west light rail route along the Perimeter, going west to Cumberland (about 9 miles (14 km) or 15 kilometers west-southwest), and east to Doraville to meet with the Gold Line.
