= Buckhead station =

MARTA rail station

N7 Buckhead
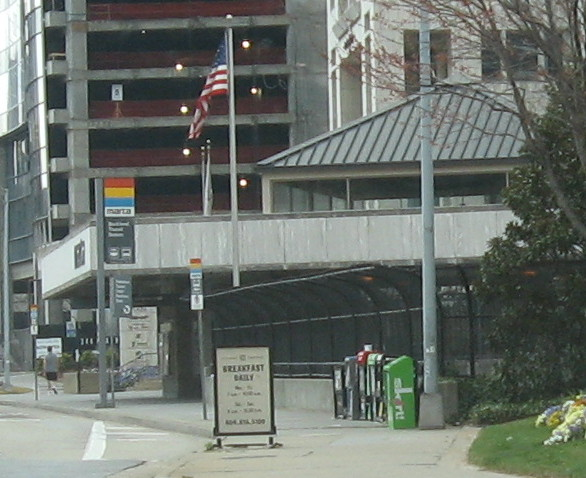
- One of the station's entrances as seen on State Route 141.

General information
- Location: 3360 Peachtree Road NE; Atlanta, Georgia 30326; United States
- Coordinates: 33.84841°N 84.367018°W
- Owner: MARTA
- Platforms: 1 island platform
- Tracks: 2
- Connections: MARTA Bus: 110, Buc Shuttle

Construction
- Structure type: At-grade
- Parking: None
- Cycle facilities: Yes
- Accessible: YES

Other information
- Station code: N7

History
- Opened: June 8, 1996; 30 years ago

Passengers
- 2013: 2,643 (avg. weekday) ▲7%

Services
Preceding station	MARTA	Following station
Lindbergh Center Terminus	Red Line Nighttime service	Medical Center toward North Springs
Lindbergh Center toward Airport	Red Line	Medical Center toward North Springs
Location

Buckhead is an at-grade subway station that serves the Red Line of the Metropolitan Atlanta Rapid Transit Authority (MARTA) rail system. This station is the first station only served by the Red Line. It is located in the Buckhead neighborhood in the median of State Route 400, a limited access highway, at Peachtree Road/State Route 141. The station is in easy walking distance of many offices, hotels and shopping centers, including Lenox Square, although the Lenox MARTA station provides easier access to the mall. The buc, a zero-fare bus service, also provides transportation to the surrounding area. The Buckhead Station also features Zipcars.

== Station layout ==
G	Street Level	Entrance/Exit, crossover to street
P Platform level	Southbound	← Red Line toward Airport (nights toward Lindbergh Center)
P Platform level	Island platform, doors will open on the left
P Platform level	Northbound	Red Line toward North Springs (Medical Center) →

== History ==
Buckhead was opened on June 8, 1996, the same day as Medical Center and Dunwoody. When State Route 400 was being constructed south of the perimeter in 1993, space was left that allowed track to be laid in the median from Buckhead all the way to Medical Center. In 2014, new pedestrian bridges were built across both sides of State Route 400, allowing better access to the Stratford on the east and Tower Place on the west.

== Nearby landmarks and popular destinations ==
- Atlanta Financial Center
- Capital City Plaza
- Buckhead Business District
- Buckhead Station Shopping Center
- Phipps Plaza
- Lenox Square

== Bus routes ==
Buckhead station is served by the following MARTA bus routes:

- Route 110 - Peachtree Road / Buckhead

The station is also served by The Buc, a microtransit service.
