= Royal Bus Lines =

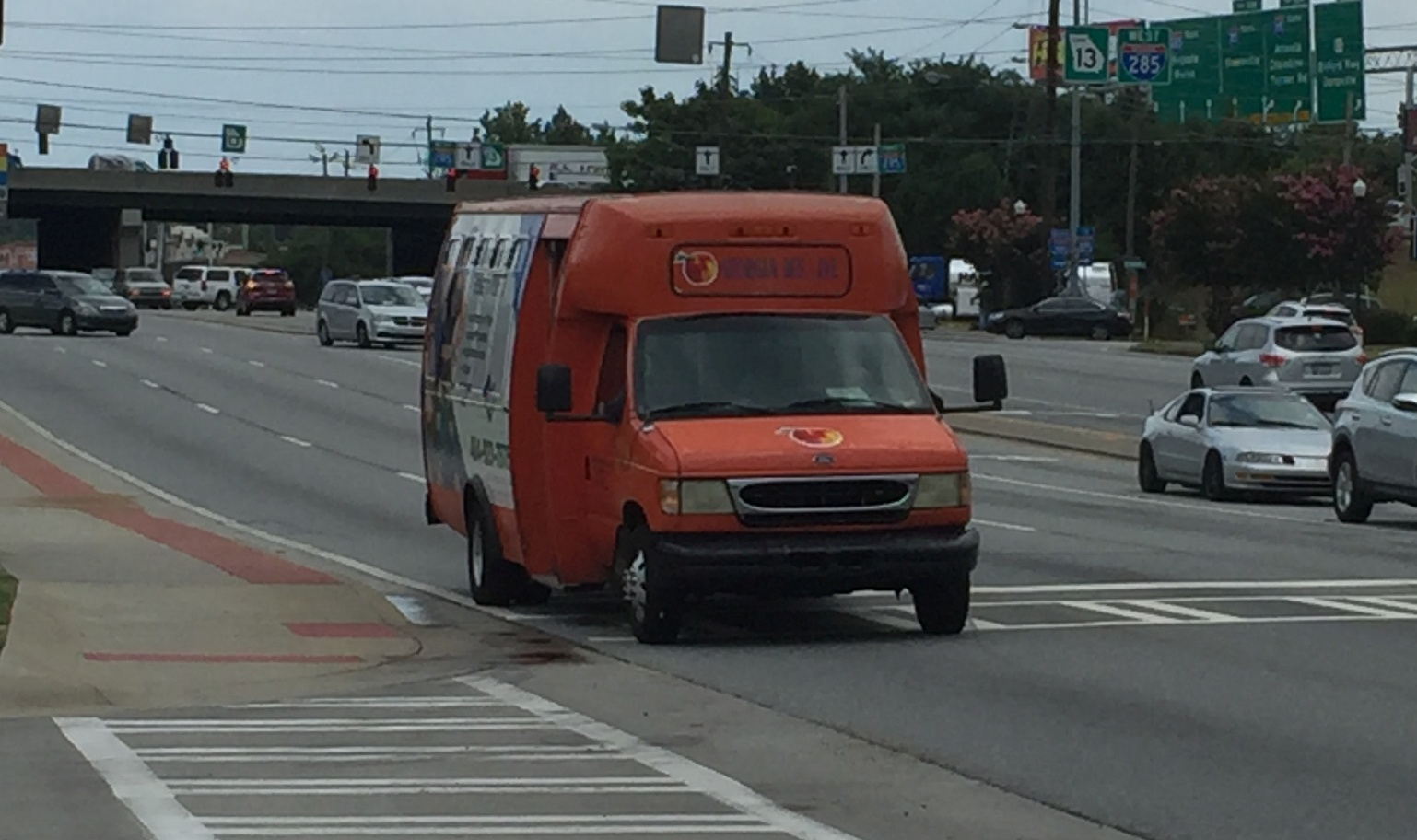
A Royal Bus Line bus on Buford Highway, 2016

Royal Bus Lines is a private bus service in Atlanta, Georgia which operates on Buford Highway and Roswell Road, servicing Perimeter Mall and other surrounding areas. The bus stops primarily at existing MARTA bus stops. The company provides 100,000 rides monthly, with gross revenues of over $1 million annually. It represents one of the first private mass transit companies to provide service solely within Atlanta.

The bus service was founded in August 2001 by Carlos Ochoa. They founded the company to directly compete with MARTA by provide better bus service to the Hispanic immigrant population on Buford Highway. The bus fare is only $1.50, 50 cents cheaper than MARTA's fare. Additionally, all drivers speak both English and Spanish. The company also strives to provide more frequent service than the MARTA bus route. However, unlike other metro Atlanta public mass transit agencies, there are no free transfers available between the Royal Bus and MARTA. Over half of the buses are owned by their drivers who act as subcontractors to Ochoa.

Although MARTA has stated that the existence of Royal Bus Lines is not a threat to its service on Buford Highway, there have been several instances of accidents between MARTA and Royal buses as they utilize the same bus stops. Both organizations have been found financially liable for causing accidents between each other's buses. Ochoa has installed cameras on his buses to document improper behavior by MARTA buses; a newspaper article reported that Ochoa had video footage of a MARTA bus driver making obscene gestures and another one grabbing his groin. A more serious dispute occurred in April 2005 when a physical dispute occurred between drivers stopped at a red light--the MARTA driver alleged coins were thrown at him by the Royal bus driver, and the Royal bus driver said a soda bottle was thrown at him by the MARTA driver.

Royal buses have also been targeted for vandalism. In 2006, three of its buses were burned shortly after the company provided free bus service to a pro-immigrant rally.
