= Pill Hill (Atlanta) =

Coordinates: 33.9077147°N 84.3523193°W

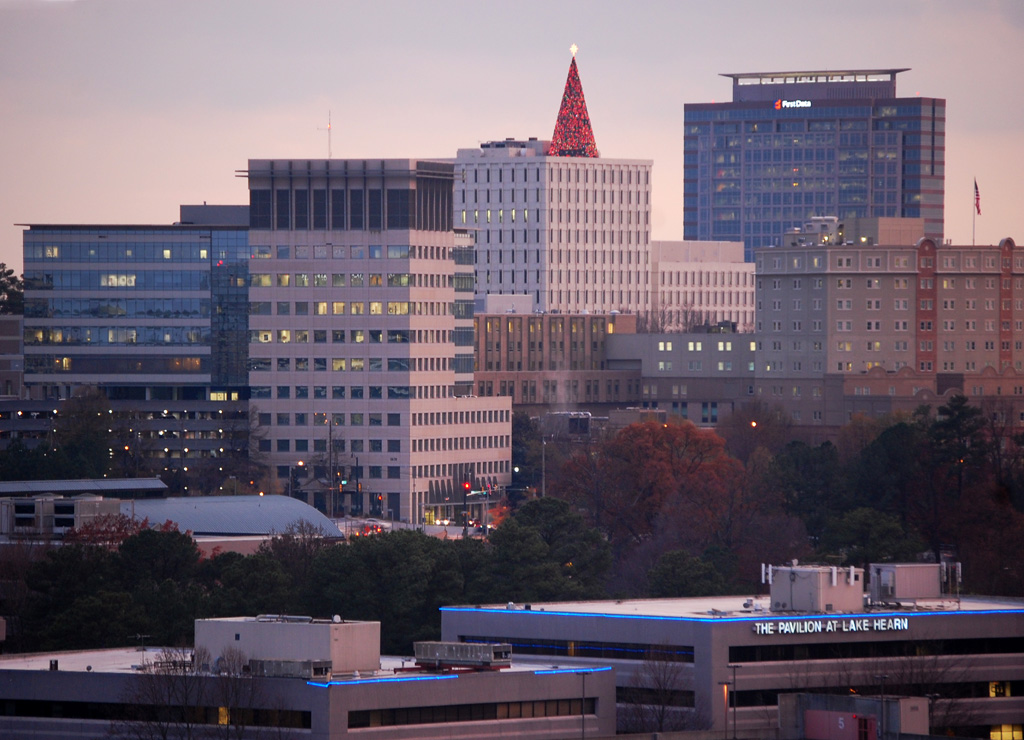
The skyline of Pill Hill

Pill Hill is a major cluster of hospitals and doctors’ offices in northern metro Atlanta, Georgia, United States. Pill Hill is in Sandy Springs, Georgia, near the intersection of Georgia 400 and Interstate 285, in the Perimeter Center district. Pill Hill has become the health-care mecca of Atlanta, with three hospitals, hundreds of physician practices, multiple outpatient centers and support services making it a premier location for medical practices. Pill Hill has grown exponentially since it began taking shape in the late 1960s when Scottish Rite, which was previously a children’s convalescent home, expanded into a full-fledged medical center in 1965. Northside Hospital became the first major medical provider to build on Pill Hill in 1970, and Saint Joseph’s was built soon after. The area has seen a major transformation over the past 40 years, as Northside has grown from 250 beds to 537 beds, while Saint Joseph’s completed a 64-bed expansion in 2005 to bring it to a total of 410 beds. Public transportation serves the district through the Medical Center MARTA Station, an at-ground rail station on the north (red) line.

The Hospitals located in the district are:

- Children's Healthcare of Atlanta at Scottish Rite
- Emory Healthcare St. Joseph's Hospital
- Northside Hospital
