= Armour Yard =

Coordinates: 33.8141°N 84.3712°W

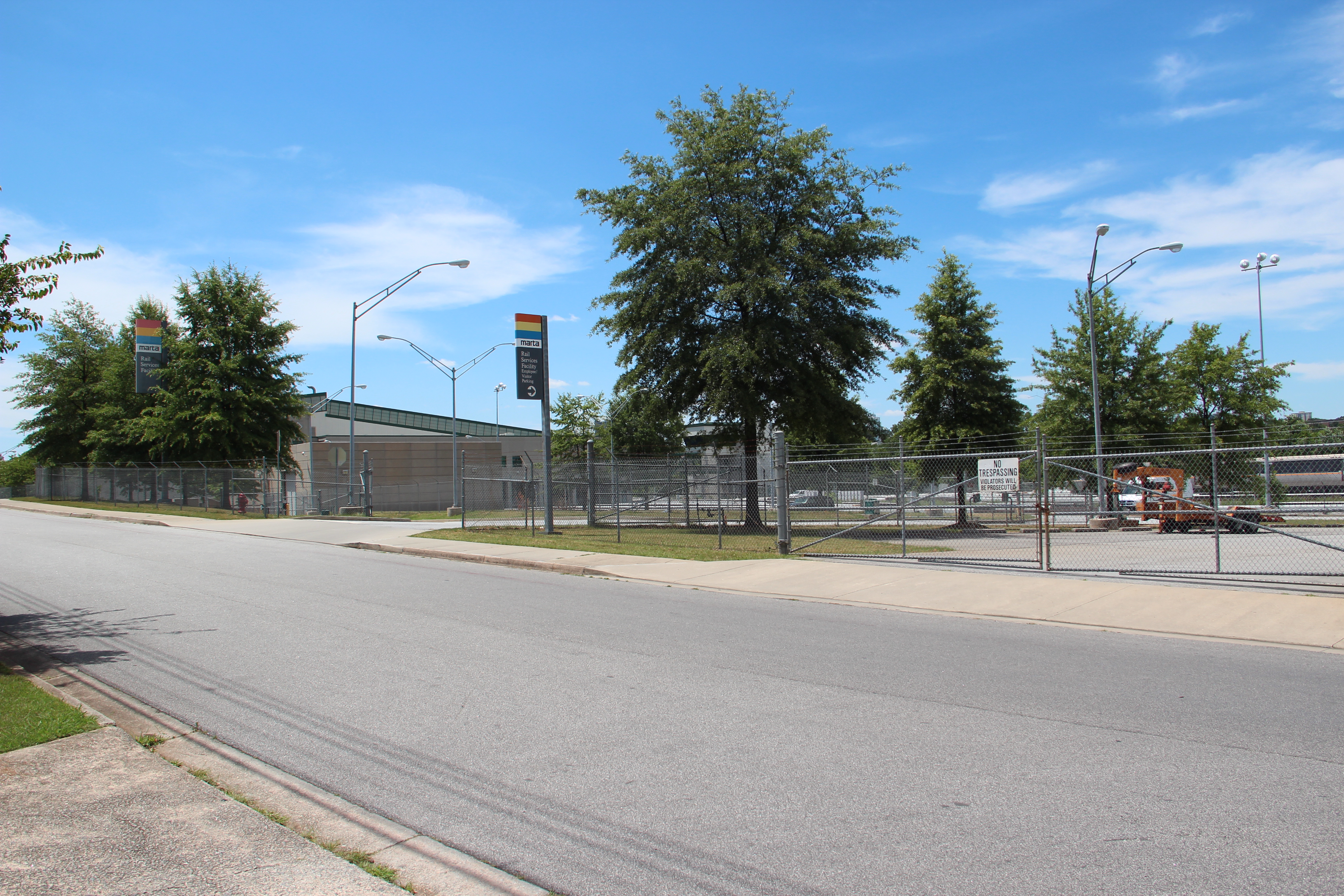
MARTA's maintenance facility at Armour Yard

Armour Yard is a railyard on the northwest side of Interstate 85 between the Piedmont Road (Georgia State Route 237) and Monroe Drive exits in northeast Atlanta, Georgia, south of the Lindbergh neighborhood of Buckhead. For southbound travelers, it can be easily seen below from the freeway viaduct, and looking underneath the massive viaduct from "old 85" (Georgia 13, the Buford-Spring Connector).

In 1900 a Belt Junction station is mentioned, which would later be renamed Armour Station. Today there is a Norfolk Southern railyard for freight trains, and since 2005 also a maintenance facility for MARTA rail, whose Red/Gold line passes through the yard. Various public transportation plans suggest building a station at Armour Yard, because it would serve to connect numerous routes which otherwise would not connect in one place:

- Amtrak line from Atlanta to Washington D.C. (currently stops at historic Peachtree Station)
- 2 potential commuter rail lines from Atlanta to points northeast such as Athens (the "Brain Train") and Gainesville
- potential light rail lines:
  - from Lindbergh station, via Armour south-southeast along the BeltLine to Virginia Highland, then west to Midtown along Ponce de Leon Avenue
  - from Lindbergh via Armour along the Clifton Corridor to Emory University and possibly through to Avondale MARTA station

The origin of the Armour Yard name may be a role as a yard for the railcars of the Armour Car Lines (railcar fleet) in the early 1900s, an offshoot of Armour and Company's role as one of America's biggest shippers.

== See also ==
- Streetcars in Atlanta
- Commuter rail in Atlanta
