= Chattahoochee River 911 Authority =

The Chattahoochee River 911 Authority, also known as ChatComm, is the public-safety answering point for all emergency calls to 9-1-1 in Sandy Springs, Johns Creek, Dunwoody, and Brookhaven, Georgia, in the northern part of metro Atlanta. The ChatComm 911 dispatch center is a public/private partnership between the cities and iXP Corporation, headquartered in Princeton, New Jersey.

== Operations ==
Begun in 2009, the 16,000-square-foot (1,500 m^{2}) call center in Sandy Springs began operating on August 31, and also included the then-new city of Johns Creek. Dunwoody joined in 2011, making it the second multi-county 911 system to span the county line from Fulton into DeKalb (the other being the city of Atlanta, which is also in both counties). The city of Brookhaven, also in DeKalb County, joined in 2014. It is named for the Chattahoochee River, which forms the northern city limit of Sandy Springs and the southeastern city limit of Johns Creek.
