= Perimeter Highway (disambiguation) =

Perimeter Highway is a beltway encircling Winnipeg, Manitoba, Canada.

Perimeter Highway may also refer to:

- The Perimeter in Atlanta, Georgia, United States, or Interstate 285

== See also ==
- Outer Perimeter, a proposed outer beltway in Atlanta
