= Dunwoody station =

MARTA rail station

N9 Dunwoody
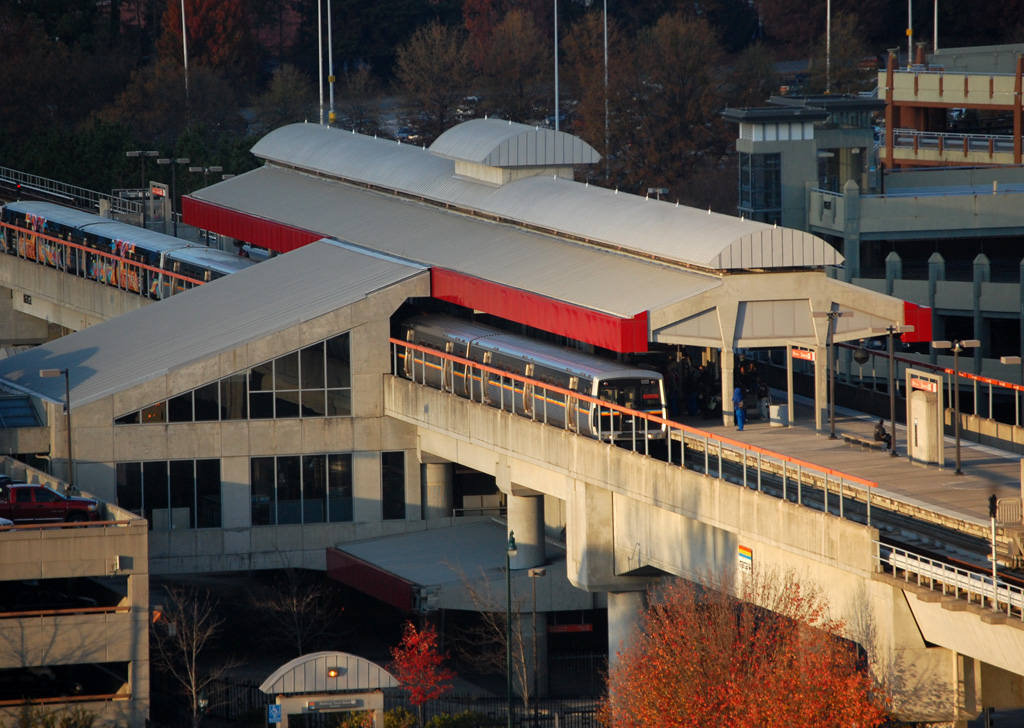

General information
- Location: 1111 Hammond Drive; Dunwoody, GA 30328
- Coordinates: 33.9212°N 84.3444°W
- Platforms: 1 island platform
- Tracks: 2
- Connections: MARTA Bus: 5, 87, 150, GRTA, PTC shuttles

Construction
- Structure type: Elevated
- Parking: 1,048 spaces
- Cycle facilities: Yes
- Accessible: YES
- Architect: Turner Associates Architects and Planners, Inc

Other information
- Station code: N9

History
- Opened: June 8, 1996; 30 years ago

Passengers
- 2013: 3,545 (avg. weekday) ▲3%

Services
Preceding station	MARTA	Following station
Medical Center toward Lindbergh Center	Red Line Nighttime Service	Sandy Springs toward North Springs
Medical Center toward Airport	Red Line	Sandy Springs toward North Springs
Location

Dunwoody is a subway station in Dunwoody, Georgia, serving the Red Line of the Metropolitan Atlanta Rapid Transit Authority (MARTA) rail system. It is located at the southwest corner of Perimeter Mall, and also serves the surrounding high-rise office parks in the Perimeter Center business district. From 1996 to 2000, it was the terminus of the old North Line.

The station serves Dunwoody as well as commuters from surrounding north DeKalb and Fulton counties. The Sandy Springs city limit is just 300 meters/1,000 feet west at the county line. It is the only Red Line station in DeKalb County, as the line (which otherwise runs in Fulton County, just west of the due north/south county line) swings east for this station.

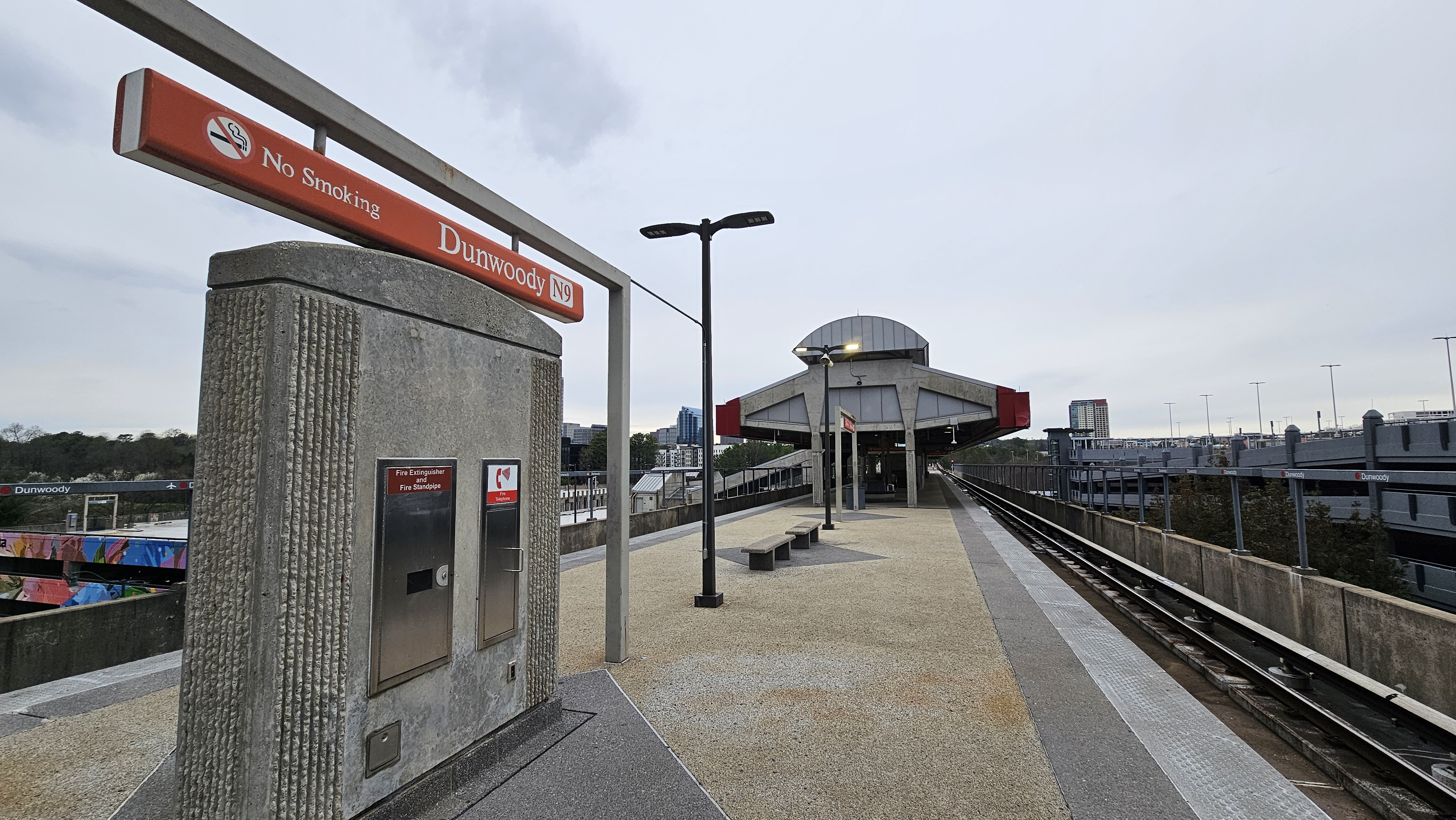
View of the station's island platform

== Station layout ==
P Platform level	Southbound	← Red Line toward Airport (nights toward Lindbergh Center) (Medical Center)
P Platform level	Island platform, doors will open on the left
P Platform level	Northbound	Red Line toward North Springs (Sandy Springs) →
G	Street Level	Entrance/Exit, station house

=== Parking ===
Dunwoody has 1,048 daily and long term parking spaces available for MARTA users which are located in two parking decks.

== Nearby landmarks and popular destinations ==
- Perimeter Mall
- Cox Communications
- Central Perimeter Business District

== Bus service ==
The station is served by the following MARTA bus routes:

- Route 5 - Piedmont Road / Sandy Springs
- Route 87 - Roswell Road / Morgan Falls
- Route 150 - Perimeter Center / Dunwoody Village

In the mornings, MARTA also provides a direct bus route toward North Springs High School via Route 87.
