= Perimeter Mall =

Shopping mall in Dunwoody, Georgia, U.S.

Coordinates: 33.923834°N 84.340544°W

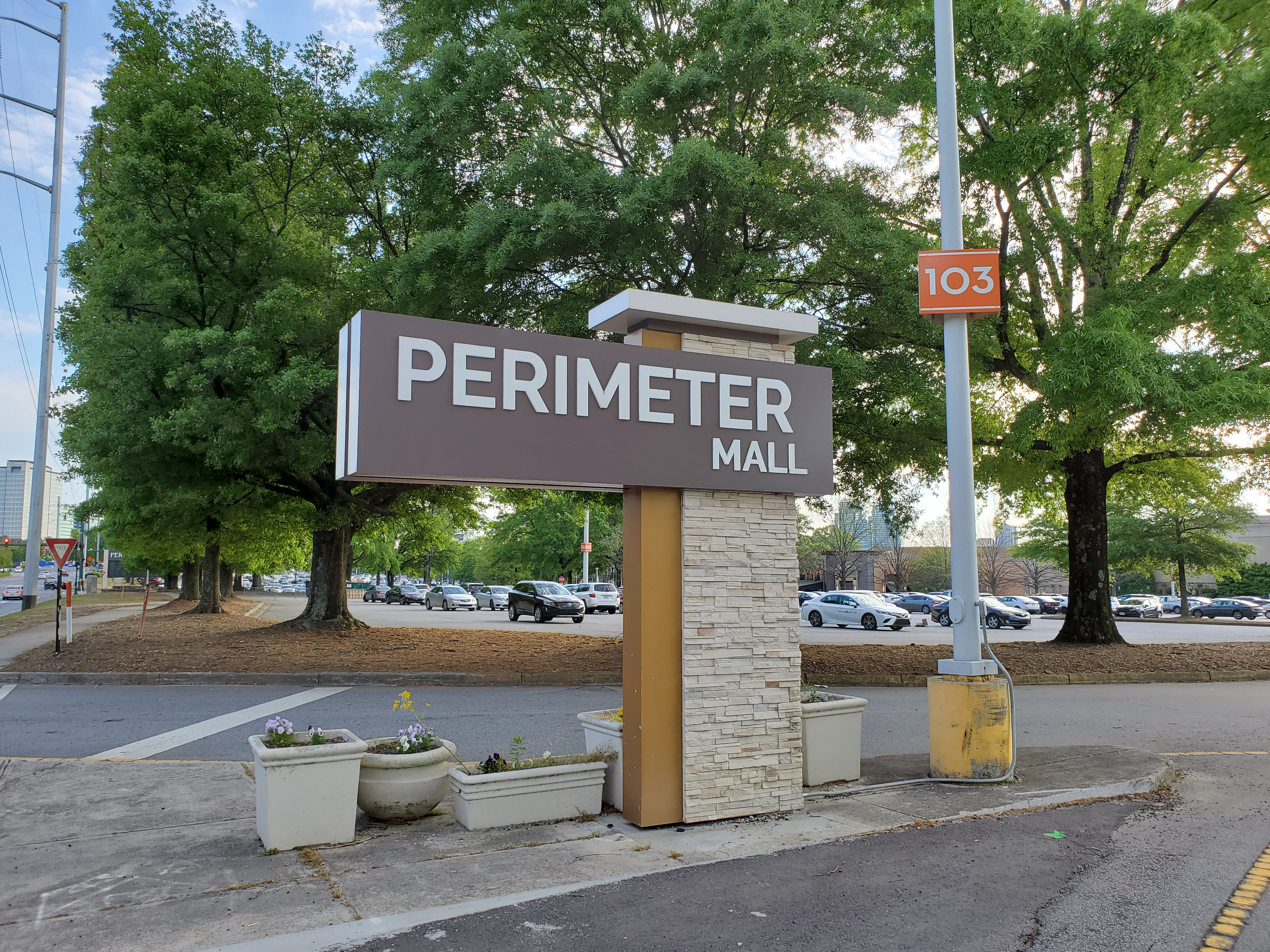

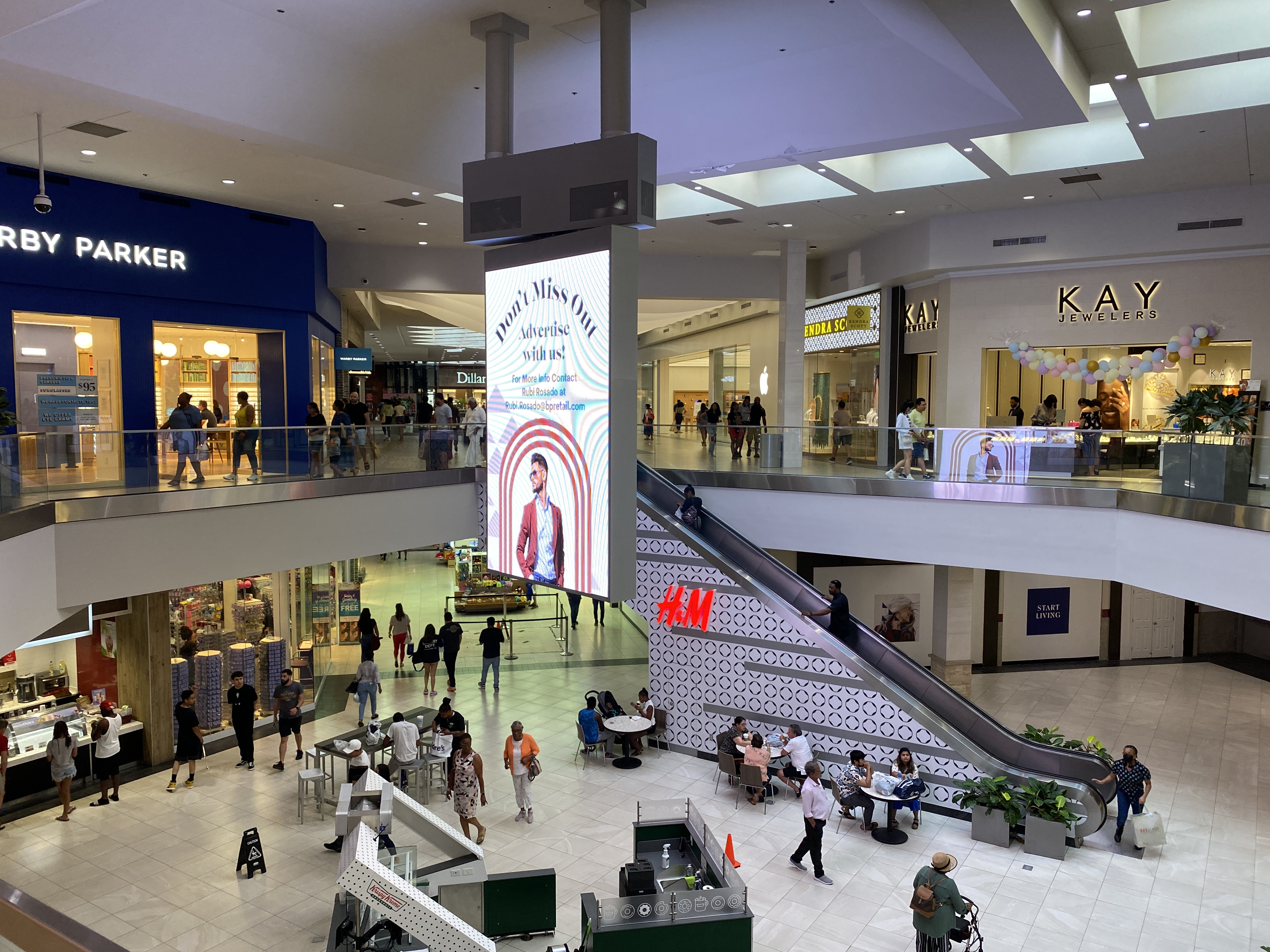
- Interior view (June 2022)
- Location: Dunwoody, Georgia, U.S. (with an Atlanta mailing address)
- Address: 4400 Ashford Dunwoody Road, Atlanta 30346
- Opened: 1971; 55 years ago
- Renovated: 2017
- Developer: The Rouse Co.
- Manager: GGP
- Owner: GGP
- Num. of stores: 158
- Num. of anchor tenants: 4
- Floor area: 1,564,046 sq ft (145,304.6 m^{2})
- Floors: 2 (3 in all anchors)
- Parking: 7,700
- Public transit: MARTA: Red Line at Dunwoody station
- Website: www.perimetermall.com

Perimeter Mall is a shopping mall in Perimeter Center, Dunwoody, Georgia, a suburb of Atlanta, near the interchange of Interstate 285 (the Perimeter) and Georgia State Route 400. It is the second-largest shopping mall in the state of Georgia, the largest being the Mall of Georgia in Buford, Georgia. The mall features Macy's, Dillard's, Von Maur, and Nordstrom.

Perimeter Mall is different from other shopping malls in Atlanta in that it is much busier than most and has more current retail stores. It also offers upscale restaurants and salons. It features valet parking. The mall sits at the center of the region called "Perimeter".

It can be accessed by MARTA's Dunwoody station, which opened at the southwest corner of its parking lot in 1996.

== History ==
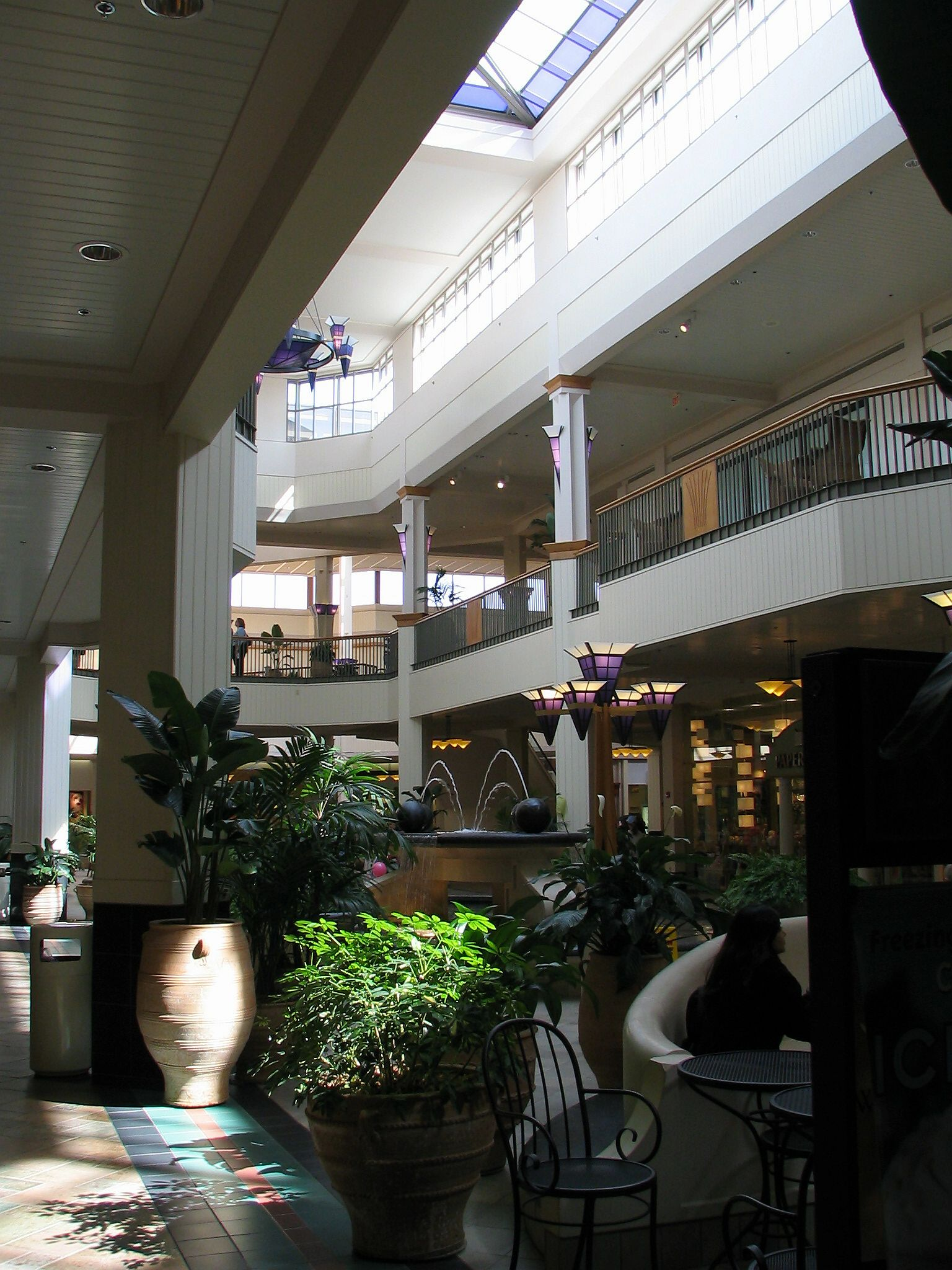
Interior of the mall in 2005

Sometime before its opening in 1971, the Spruill family sold a large portion of their property for the construction of Perimeter Mall, with the completion of Dunwoody Village occurring the same year.

Perimeter Mall opened (1971) and was the fourth mall to open in DeKalb County, after Avondale Mall in 1964, North DeKalb Mall in 1965, and the Gallery at South DeKalb in 1968. Its original anchor stores were Rich's and JCPenney, which made it very similar in design and layout to the nearby Greenbriar Mall. Perimeter Mall was the first mall in metro Atlanta to be located outside of I-285.

In 1977, the first Great American Cookie Company store opened at the mall.

In 1982, an additional wing that included a Davison's was added. This gave the mall a T shape. Davison's became Macy's in 1986.

On April 25, 1990, James Calvin Brady, a 31-year-old man with a psychiatric history, opened fire with a revolver in the food court, killing one person and injuring 4 others before turning himself in to the police.

A brand new 5-level parking garage was built in November 1997.

On February 20, 1998, Nordstrom opened its first location in the Southeast, a 3-level 230,000 square foot store in the mall. The same year Nordstrom opened, the mall was expanded again.

The Cheesecake Factory would officially open at Perimeter Mall in 2000. JCPenney closed that same year, and the store was demolished to make way for a new Dillard's, which opened in 2005.

The Rouse Company reaquired full control of Perimeter Mall in 2002 from Rodamco North America in collaboration with Simon Property Group and Westfield. Rouse sold the property to General Growth Properties one year later. GGP then acquired Rouse in November of the year after that.

Rich's became Rich's-Macy's in 2003, and the original Macy's closed and became Bloomingdale's the same year. Rich's-Macy's became just Macy's in 2005.

In 2012, it was announced Von Maur would reconstruct and replace Bloomingdale's which would shutter.

In 2013, the food court was renovated and a Chipotle Mexican Grill was added.

From 2015 to 2017, the mall underwent renovations including new ceramic flooring, new lighting, modern seating areas, updated restrooms and new signage. Some of the mall's original 1970s decor was replaced.

General Growth Properties was acquired by Brookfield Properties in August 2018.

By 2023, since the government lockdown, Perimeter Mall had announced several newest additions, among them are Ubikwitas7 World Of Hats, Psycho Bunny, Mango, Fabletics, Lovisa, and Warby Parker.

The 2024 Christmas action film Red One had its mall scenes filmed at the Perimeter Mall.

Brookfield Properties rebranded its retail division back to the GGP name in January 2026.
