= Red Line (MARTA) =

Rapid transit line in Metro Atlanta, Georgia

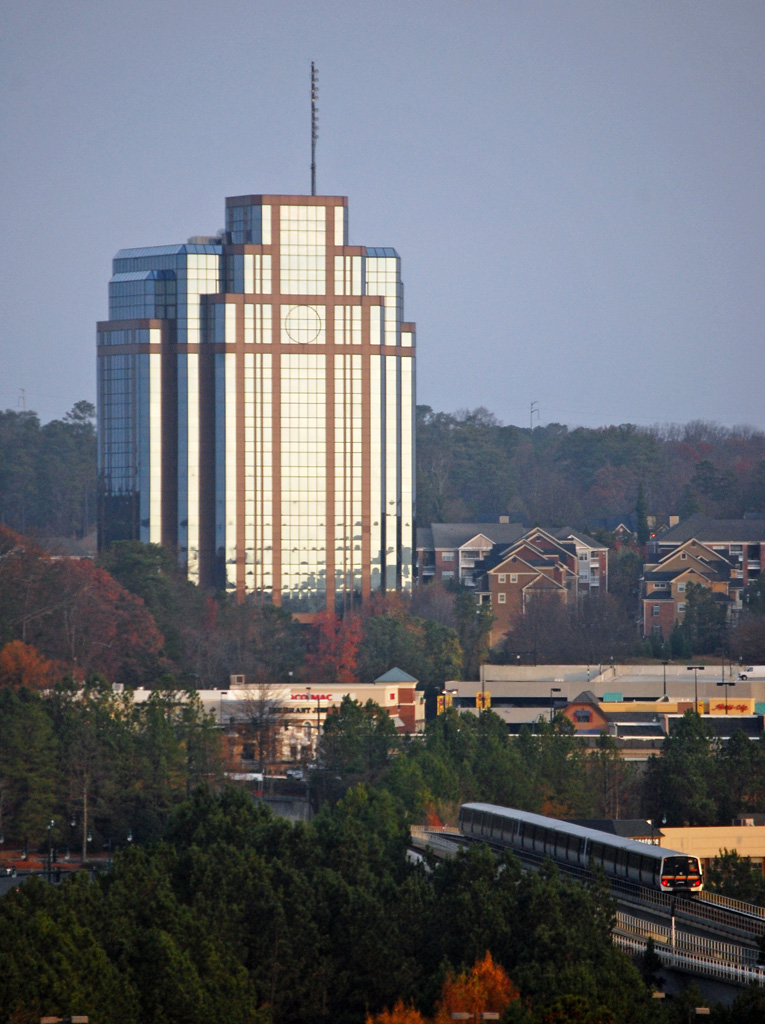
- A Red Line train near Dunwoody station

Overview
- Status: Operational
- Locale: Atlanta, Georgia
- Termini: North Springs; Lindbergh Center (weekday nights) Airport
- Stations: 19 (11 North, Five Points, 7 South)

Service
- Type: Rapid transit
- System: MARTA rail
- Operator(s): MARTA
- Rolling stock: See MARTA rail#Rolling stock

History
- Opened: 1996

Technical
- Character: at grade, elevated, underground
- Track gauge: 4 ft 8 1/2 in (1,435 mm) standard gauge
- Electrification: Third rail, 750 V DC
Route map
Red Line highlighted in red
Key

The Red Line is a rapid transit line in the MARTA rail system. It operates between North Springs and Airport stations, running through Sandy Springs, Dunwoody, Atlanta, East Point and College Park.

== History ==
What is now the Gold and Red Lines' shared section was originally opened on December 4, 1981, as the North-South Line between Garnett and North Avenue. On September 11, 1982, an infill station at Peachtree Center opened, while the North-South Line was extended south by one stop to West End station. On December 18 the same year, the North-South Line was extended northward to Midtown and Arts Center. On December 15, 1984, the Lakewood/Fort McPherson, Oakland City, and Lindbergh Center stations all opened, as did the Lenox, and Brookhaven on what was then the northernmost portion of the North-South Line (what is now the Gold Line). East Point station opened on August 16, 1986, followed by Chamblee (now a Gold Line station) on December 19, 1987, and the College Park and Airport on June 18, 1988. Finally, Doraville (later the northern terminus of the Gold Line) opened on December 29, 1992.

On June 8, 1996, MARTA added a new branch of the North-South Line, with stations at Buckhead, Medical Center, and Dunwoody: the first rail stations served exclusively by what is now the Red Line. To distinguish the two lines, the line to Dunwoody assumed the North-South Rail Line name, while the line to Doraville became the Northeast-South Rail Line (sometimes known as the Northeast Line for short). However, both the North-South Line and the Northeast Line continued to be colored on maps in orange as a single North-South Rail Line.

In December 2006, the North-South Line began to be colored as red, distinguishing it from the Northeast Line, which retained the color orange. Later, in October 2009, MARTA introduced a color-coded system of naming rail lines, with the North-South Line being renamed to the Red Line, and the Northeast Line being renamed to the Yellow Line, and then to the Gold Line.

=== Proposed extension ===
In 2003, MARTA began exploring options to extend the Red Line north of Sandy Springs. In 2011, MARTA initiated its Alternatives Analysis to study options for extending the Red Line to SR-140 as part of the regional one-cent sales tax referendum. The Georgia 400 Transit Initiative, or Connect 400. was a future plan to further expand the Red Line an additional 11.9 miles to the northern end of Fulton County running on or parallel to Georgia 400. The plans included stations at Northridge Road, Holcomb Bridge Road, North Point Mall / Encore Parkway, Old Milton Parkway, and Windward Parkway. The project was tabled in 2016 when the Georgia Senate rejected two bills authorizing a sales tax funding the project.

== Future ==
On March 25, 2024, Andre Dickens, the mayor of Atlanta, announced plans for four new infill stations on the MARTA rail network, with one of them, Murphy Crossing, being a station on the Red and Gold Lines' shared section. Murphy Crossing will be on the west side of the Atlanta Beltline. On April 11, Dickens announced that another one of the four proposed stations will also be shared by the Red and Gold Lines: namely, Armour Yards, located near the similarly-named Armour Yard.

== Operations ==
Now known as the Red Line, it shares trackage with its counterpart, the Gold Line, between Airport and just north of the Lindbergh Center.

On weekdays, after 8:30 pm, Red Line shuttle train service operates between North Springs and Lindbergh Center stations only until the end of the service. On Saturdays and Sundays, Red Line service operates through to Airport station during all operating hours. When major single tracking occurs, Red Line train service operates between North Springs and Lindbergh Center stations only.

== Route ==
The Red Line runs above ground, at-grade and below ground in various portions of its route. It begins at the northern terminus, the North Springs station in Sandy Springs. The non-revenue tracks extend northward from the station. It then goes southward paralleling GA 400 (Turner McDonald Parkway) before turning southeast to Dunwoody, then turning south to cross over I-285, then west before running south in the GA 400 median. In Buckhead, it crosses under the Gold Line before joining the Gold Line, going southwest paralleling I-85. It turns south through Midtown and enters downtown Atlanta, where it meets the Blue and Green Lines at Five Points station. Leaving downtown, the Red Line continues south, paralleling Lee Street and Main Street into East Point and College Park before reaching its terminus at the Airport station.

=== Stations ===
listed from north to south

Station	Code	Opening year	Rail Line Transfer	Service pattern	
Station	Code	Opening year	Rail Line Transfer	Main Line Regular service	Shuttle 8:30 pm – 1:00 am
North Springs	N11	December 16, 2000		●	●
Sandy Springs	N10	December 16, 2000		●	●
Dunwoody	N9	June 8, 1996		●	●
Medical Center	N8	June 8, 1996		●	●
Buckhead	N7	June 8, 1996		●	●
Lindbergh Center	N6	December 15, 1984	Gold	●	●
Arts Center	N5	December 18, 1982	Gold	●	
Midtown	N4	December 18, 1982	Gold	●	
North Avenue	N3	December 4, 1981	Gold	●	
Civic Center	N2	December 4, 1981	Gold	●	
Peachtree Center	N1	September 11, 1982	Gold Streetcar	●	
Five Points (Note: The east–west (now Blue/Green Line) platform opened in 1979.)		December 4, 1981	Gold Blue Green	●	
Garnett	S1	December 4, 1981	Gold	●	
West End	S2	September 11, 1982	Gold	●	
Oakland City	S3	December 15, 1984	Gold	●	
Lakewood/Fort McPherson	S4	December 15, 1984	Gold	●	
East Point	S5	August 16, 1986	Gold	●	
College Park	S6	June 18, 1988.	Gold	●	
Airport	S7	June 18, 1988.	Gold	●	
