= Lindbergh Center station =

MARTA rail station

N6 Lindbergh Center
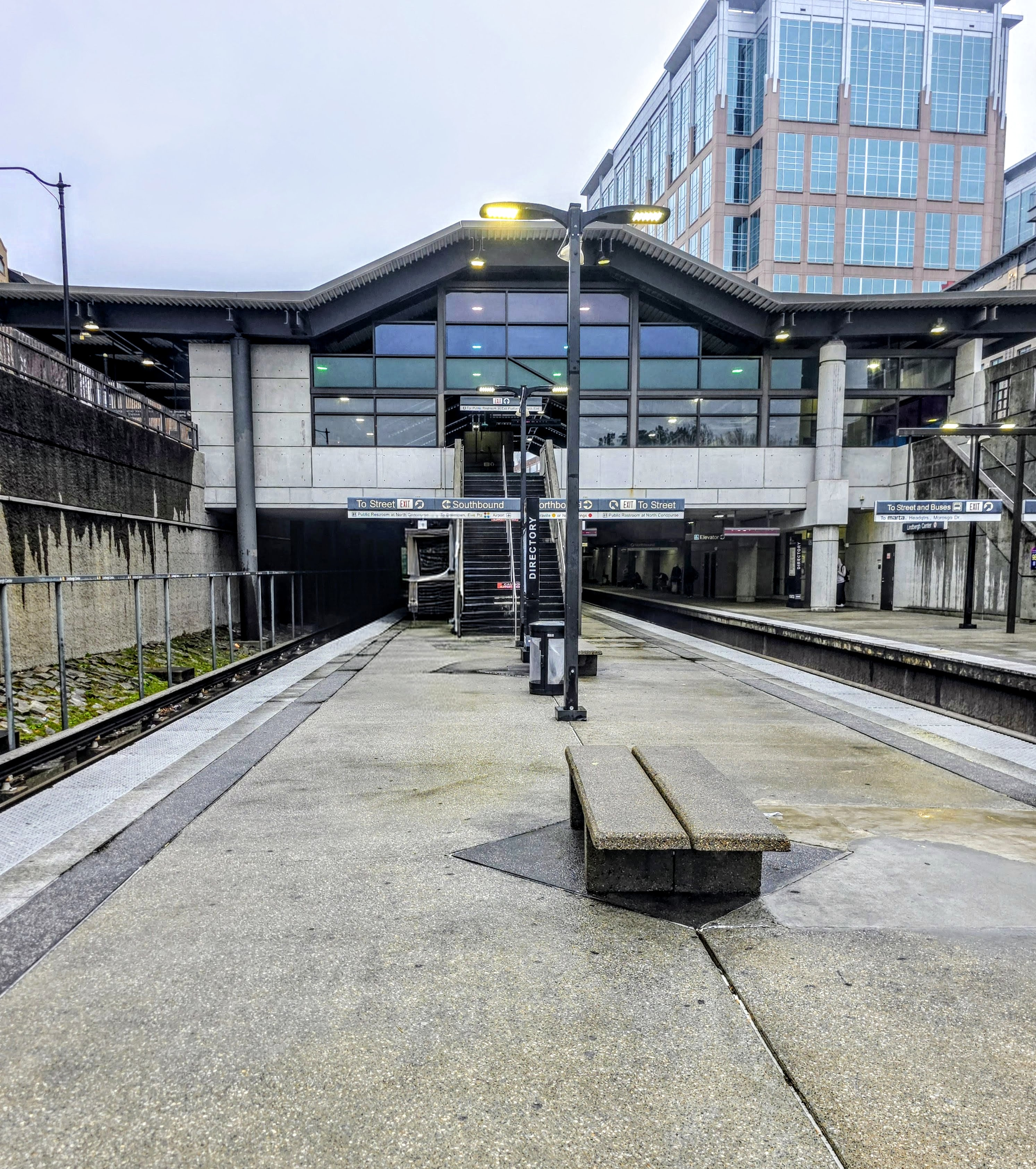
- Northbound and southbound platforms at Lindbergh Center

General information
- Location: 2424 Piedmont Road; Lindbergh/Morosgo neighborhood Atlanta, Georgia 30324
- Coordinates: 33.821995°N 84.367447°W
- Platforms: 1 side platform (Northbound only) and 1 island platform
- Tracks: 2
- Connections: MARTA Bus: 5, 6, 30, 39, 809, GRTA, Royal Bus Lines buses

Construction
- Structure type: Open cut
- Parking: City center: 1,578 spaces Garson: 785 spaces Sidney Marcus: 544 spaces
- Cycle facilities: None
- Accessible: YES
- Architect: Robert Traynham Coles, P.C.

Other information
- Station code: N6

History
- Opened: December 15, 1984; 41 years ago
- Rebuilt: 2002

Passengers
- 2013: 8,604 ▼6%

Services
Preceding station	MARTA	Following station
Terminus	Red Line Nights	Buckhead toward North Springs
Arts Center toward Airport	Red Line	Buckhead toward North Springs
Arts Center toward Airport	Gold Line	Lenox toward Doraville
Future Services
Preceding station	MARTA	Following station
Proposed service
Terminus	Clifton Corridor	Cheshire Bridge Road towards Avondale
Location

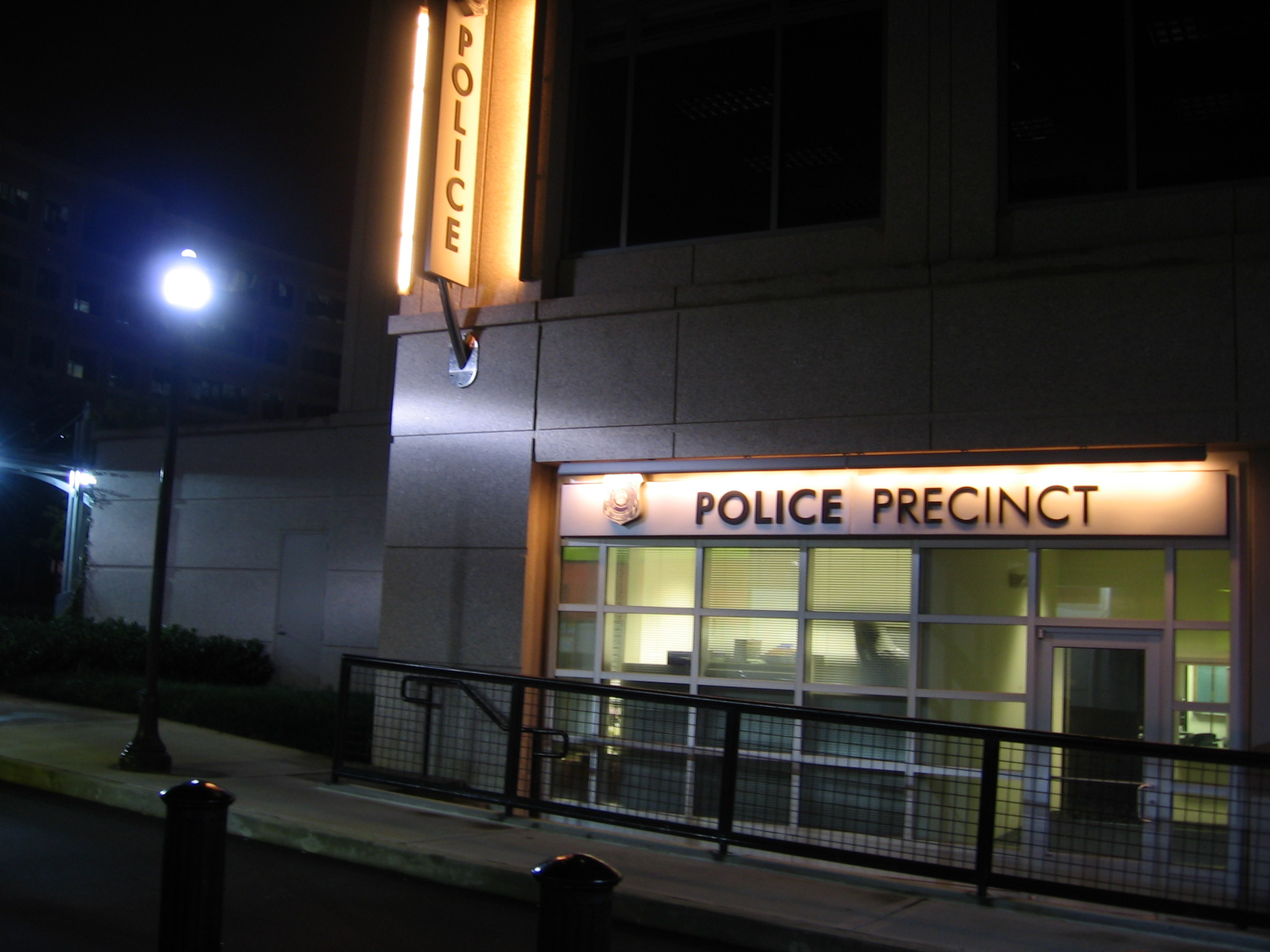
MARTA police station at Lindbergh Center

Lindbergh Center station is an at-grade rapid transit station in Atlanta, Georgia, serving the Red and Gold lines of the Metropolitan Atlanta Rapid Transit Authority (MARTA) rail system. It serves the Lindbergh/Morosgo neighborhood in southern Buckhead, and is a part-time terminus of the Red Line and the last transfer point for the Red (North Springs) and Gold (Doraville) rail lines. It is the only station on this route served by the Red and Gold lines at all times. This is the third busiest station in the MARTA system, handling an average of 23,400 boardings per weekday. It is important to the MARTA system for a number of reasons. It is adjacent to the MARTA headquarters building, located just north of the Armour Yard Rail Services Facility (opened in 2005), which allows trains to come into service at a more central location than was previously possible, and at an important junction point for the future Beltline trail and Clifton Corridor.

On the first floor of the headquarters building is the MARTA Reduced Fare Office. It provides access to The Lindbergh Center business, shopping, and dining district, MARTA headquarters, the twin AT&T towers (formerly BellSouth), Xpress bus service to Discover Mills and HighTech Institute. It also provides connecting bus service to Ansley Mall, Atlanta History Center, Emory University, Northlake Mall, Toco Hills Shopping Plaza, Georgia Department of Labor, and the Dekalb-Peachtree Airport.

South of this station, both Red and Gold Line trains goes into a tunnel portal, as the next station south is an underground subway stop.

== Station layout ==
G	Street Level	Entrance/Exit, station house
P Platform level	Southbound	← Red Line, Gold Line toward Airport (Arts Center) ← Red Line nighttime termination track
P Platform level	Island platform, doors will open on the left
P Platform level	Northbound	Gold Line toward Doraville (Lenox) → Red Line toward North Springs (Buckhead) →
P Platform level	Side platform, doors will open on the right

== History ==
Originally, the station consisted of a single island platform when opened in 1984. In 2002, during the development of the surrounding area, a side platform was constructed on the northbound side of the station to accommodate the increased ridership and transfers between the Red and Gold rail lines.

== Parking ==
Lindbergh Center has three parking decks for MARTA patrons. City center has 1,578 parking spaces, Garson has 785 parking spaces, and Sidney Marcus has 544 parking spaces. Due to underuse, some decks may have closed down several levels.

== Bus routes ==
The station is served by the following MARTA bus routes:

=== North Bus Bays ===
- Route 5 - Piedmont Road / Sandy Springs
- Route 6 - Clifton Road / Emory University
- Route 30 - LaVista Road
- Route 39 - Buford Highway
- Route 809 - Monroe Drive / Boulevard

== Connections to other transit systems ==
- Georgia Regional Transportation Authority*
- Georgia Bus Lines Buford Highway jitneys (privately owned; no free transfers to/from MARTA)
