= North Springs station =

MARTA rail station

N11 North Springs
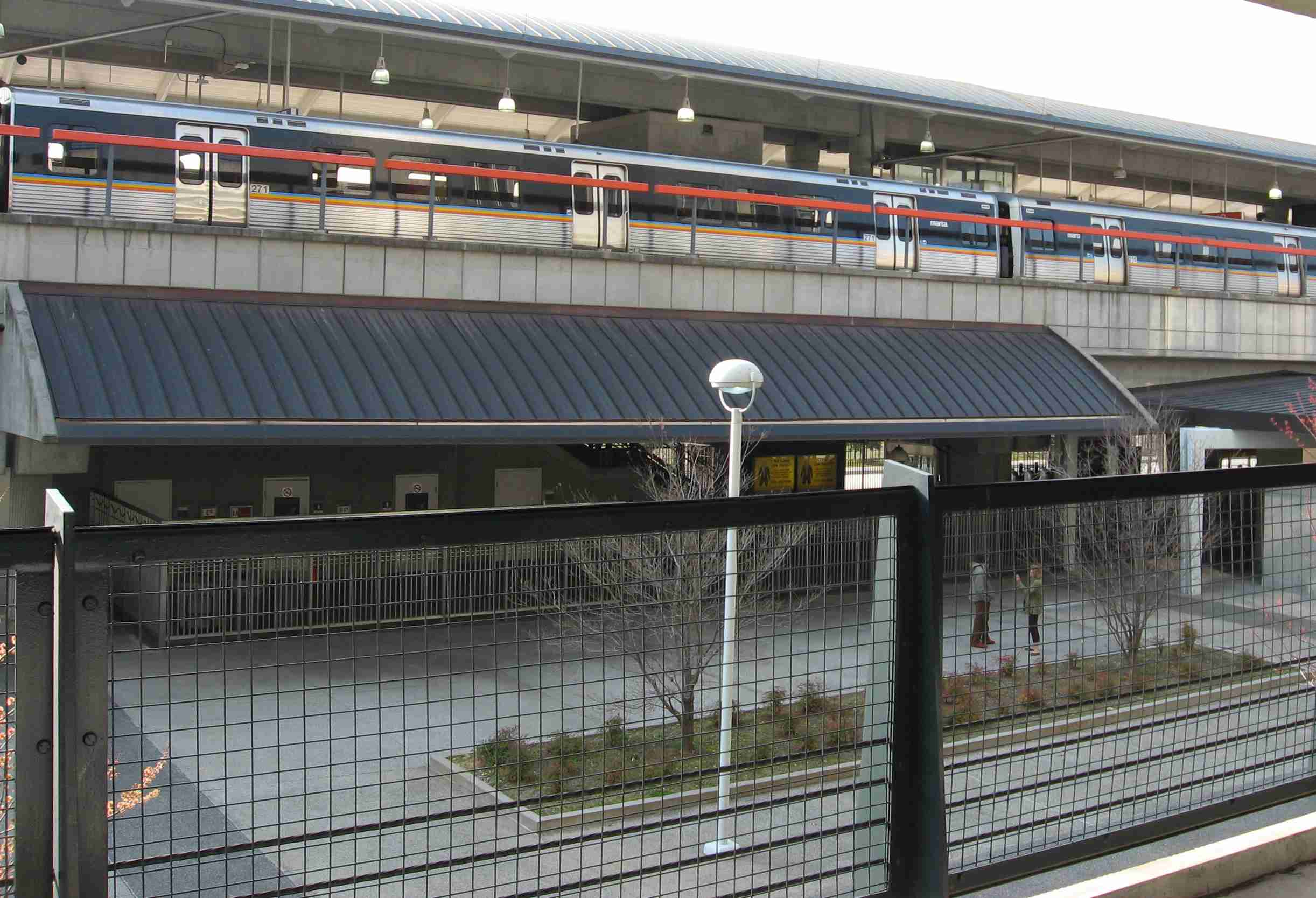
- View of the station from the parking garage

General information
- Location: 7010 Peachtree Dunwoody Road; Sandy Springs, Georgia 30328
- Coordinates: 33.944552°N 84.356206°W
- Owner: MARTA
- Platforms: 1 island platform
- Tracks: 2
- Connections: MARTA Bus: 85, 87, 140, 141, 143, 185, GRTA Xpress

Construction
- Structure type: Elevated
- Parking: 2,325 spaces
- Cycle facilities: 14 spaces
- Accessible: YES

Other information
- Station code: N11

History
- Opened: December 16, 2000; 25 years ago

Passengers
- 2013: 6,436 (avg. weekday) ▲2%

Services
| Preceding station | MARTA | Following station |
|---|---|---|
| Sandy Springs toward Lindbergh Center | Red Line Nighttime Service | Terminus |
| Sandy Springs toward Airport | Red Line | Terminus |
Location

North Springs is an elevated subway station in Sandy Springs, Georgia, and the northern terminus for the Red Line of the Metropolitan Atlanta Rapid Transit Authority (MARTA) rail system. North Springs is primarily a commuter station for Atlanta workers and university students, featuring a large parking deck and direct access on and off State Route 400, a major highway for commuters, so that drivers can avoid surface roads. North Springs attracts commuters from Roswell, Alpharetta and other towns north on State Route 400. As the northern terminus, this station is a hub for buses that continue on north, with connecting bus services to Sandy Springs, the city of Alpharetta, North Point Mall, the city of Roswell, the Ameris Bank Amphitheatre at Encore Park, the Mansell Road and Windward Parkway park-and-rides, and even as far north as the city of Milton. This station also provides bus assistance from North Springs High School via MARTA bus route 87.

In addition to its direct exit from southbound Georgia 400 and a direct entrance to northbound Georgia 400, there is also a surface street entrance for nearby residents off Peachtree Dunwoody Road NE. Commuters who enter the station from Georgia 400 south must exit the station via Georgia 400 north, and local commuters entering from Peachtree Dunwoody Road must exit to Peachtree Dunwoody Road.

Furthermore, North Springs features a Zipcar, bicycle racks for up to 14 bikes, and one of only two human cashiers, the other being at Sandy Springs.

== History ==
Both North Springs and Sandy Springs stations were opened on December 16, 2000 as part of MARTA's most recent expansion, adding two more stations north of Dunwoody. In 2013, MARTA studied expending the Red Line further north along Georgia 400 to Windward Parkway. The project was effectively cancelled in 2016 when the Georgia Senate rejected bills permitting a sales tax funding it.

== Station layout ==
| P Platform level | Southbound | ← Red Line toward Airport (nights toward Lindbergh Center) (Sandy Springs) |
| P Platform level | Island platform, doors will open on the left, right |
| P Platform level | Southbound | ← Red Line toward Airport (nights toward Lindbergh Center) (Sandy Springs) |
| G | Street Level | Entrance/Exit, station house |

=== Parking ===
North Springs has 2,325 daily and long term parking spaces available for MARTA users which are located in one parking deck. A pedestrian bridge, on the fifth floor, connects the parking deck to nearby apartment complex at Peachtree Dunwoody Ct.

== Bus service ==
The station is served by the following MARTA bus routes:

- Route 85 - Roswell / Mansell Road
- Route 87 - Roswell Road / Morgan Falls
- Route 140 - North Point Parkway
- Route 141 - Haynes Bridge Road / Milton
- Route 143 - Windward Park & Ride
- Route 185 - Alpharetta / Old Milton Parkway
