= Garnett station =

MARTA rail station

S1 Garnett
- Entrance to Garnett station

General information
- Location: 225 Peachtree Street SW; Atlanta, GA 30303
- Coordinates: 33.747845°N 84.396415°W
- Platforms: 1 island platform
- Tracks: 2
- Bus operators: MARTA Bus: 40; Greyhound

Construction
- Structure type: Elevated
- Parking: None
- Cycle facilities: 2 spaces
- Accessible: YES
- Architect: Cooper Carry & Associates, Inc.

Other information
- Station code: S1

History
- Opened: December 4, 1981; 44 years ago

Passengers
- 2013: 1,516 (avg. weekday) 0%

Services
Preceding station	MARTA	Following station
West End toward Airport	Red Line	Five Points toward North Springs
West End toward Airport	Gold Line	Five Points toward Doraville
Location

Garnett is a subway station in Atlanta, Georgia, on the Red and Gold lines of the Metropolitan Atlanta Rapid Transit Authority (MARTA) rail system. It has an island platform between two tracks with the north end of the platform facing a tunnel portal that leads to the Five Points station and other downtown Atlanta underground stations. This station has three levels. It was opened on December 4, 1981. The upper level has an entrance from the street and a mezzanine that is about 3/4 the length of the platform below. The lower level of the station is another entrance from another street and there is a Greyhound Bus Terminal next to the station. This station mainly serves South Downtown, Castleberry Hill, is a main gateway to tourists visiting Atlanta by Greyhound. and it provides access to the Municipal Court of Atlanta, Atlanta City Hall, Atlanta Public Schools, Castleberry Hill, The Grady Detention Center, and the main Greyhound Bus Terminal.

== Station layout ==
M	Mezzanine	Fare barriers, to Entrances/Exits
P Platform level	Southbound	← Red Line, Gold Line toward Airport (West End)
P Platform level	Island platform, doors will open on the left
P Platform level	Northbound	Gold Line toward Doraville (Five Points) → Red Line toward North Springs (Five Points) →
G	Street Level	Entrance/Exit

== Bus service ==
Garnett station is served by the following MARTA bus routes:

- Route 40 - Peachtree Street / Downtown

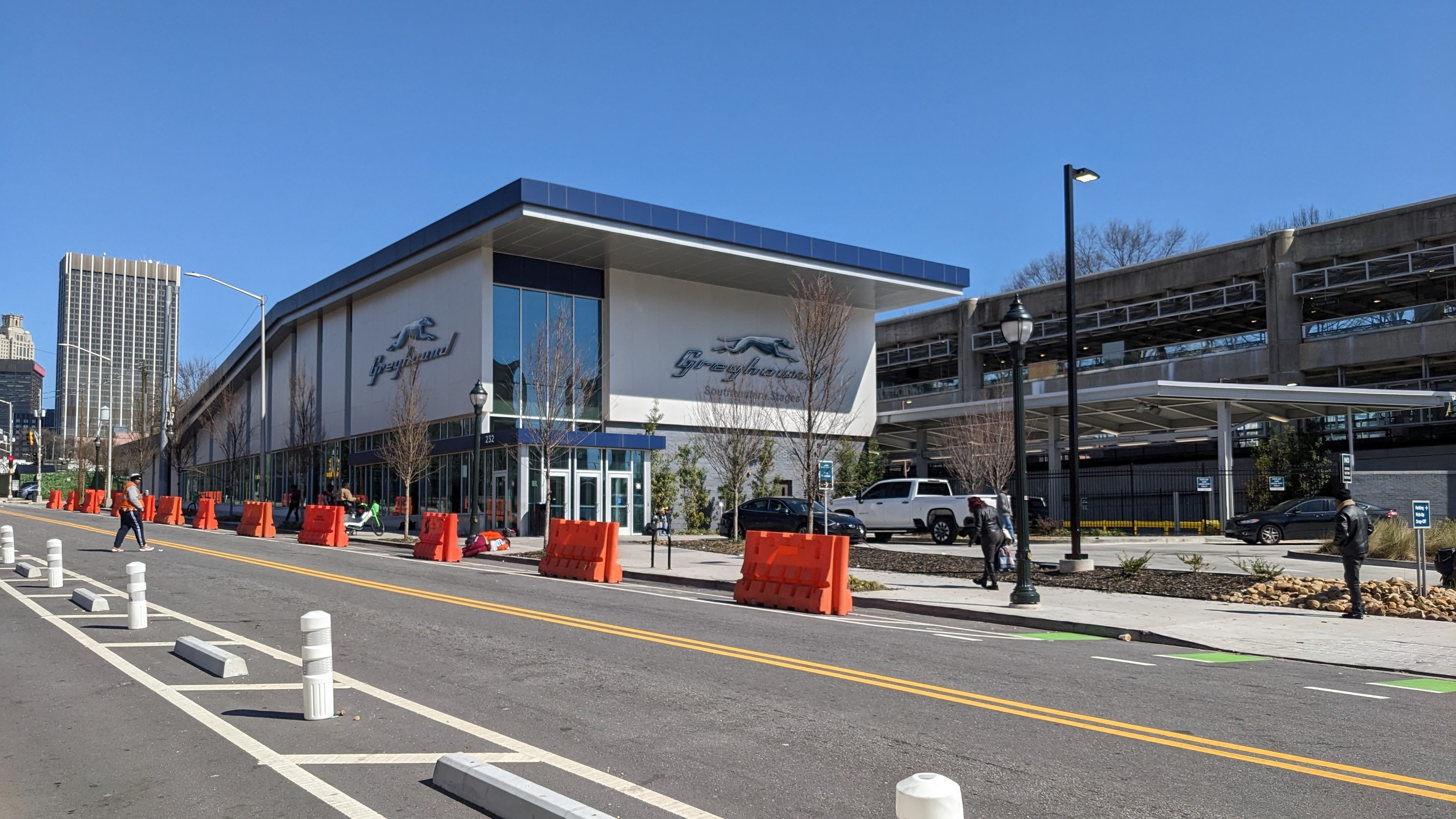
Atlanta Bus Station in 2025, MARTA station visible to the right

The station is also located next to the intercity bus terminal for Greyhound and Southeastern Stages.
