= Civic Center station (MARTA) =

MARTA rail station

N2 Civic Center
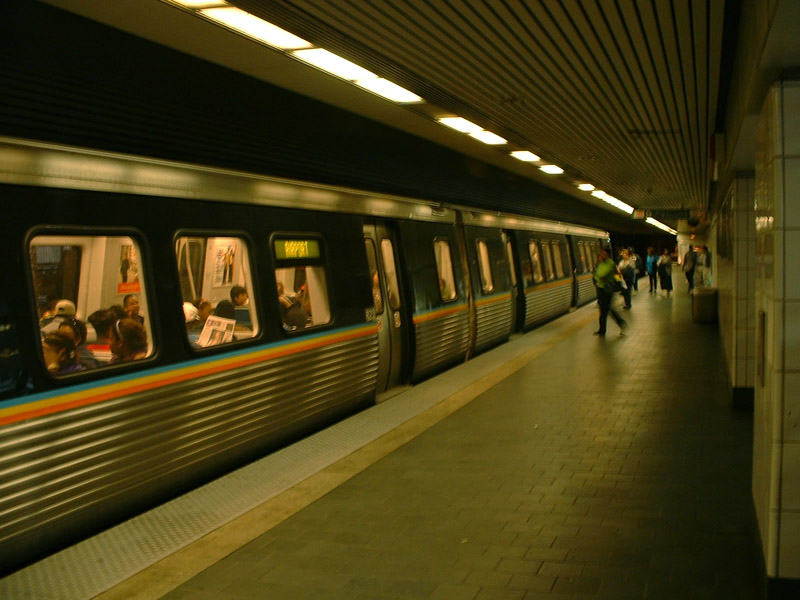
- Southbound platform

General information
- Location: 435 West Peachtree Street NW; Atlanta, GA 30308
- Coordinates: 33.766305°N 84.387209°W
- Platforms: 2 side platforms
- Tracks: 2
- Connections: MARTA Bus: 816; CobbLinc; Ride Gwinnett; GRTA

Construction
- Structure type: Elevated, Underground
- Parking: None
- Cycle facilities: None
- Accessible: Yes
- Architect: M. Garland Reynolds and Partners, Architects; Welton Becket Associate Architects

Other information
- Station code: N2

History
- Opened: December 4, 1981; 44 years ago

Passengers
- 2013: 2,692 (avg. weekday) 0%

Services
Preceding station	MARTA	Following station
Peachtree Center toward Airport	Red Line	North Avenue toward North Springs
Peachtree Center toward Airport	Gold Line	North Avenue toward Doraville
Location

Civic Center station is an elevated subway station in Atlanta, Georgia, serving the Red and Gold lines of the Metropolitan Atlanta Rapid Transit Authority (MARTA) rail system. It is located in Atlanta's SoNo district. Civic Center station opened in 1981 and is the only station on the MARTA network that partially elevated and sunken.

== Location ==
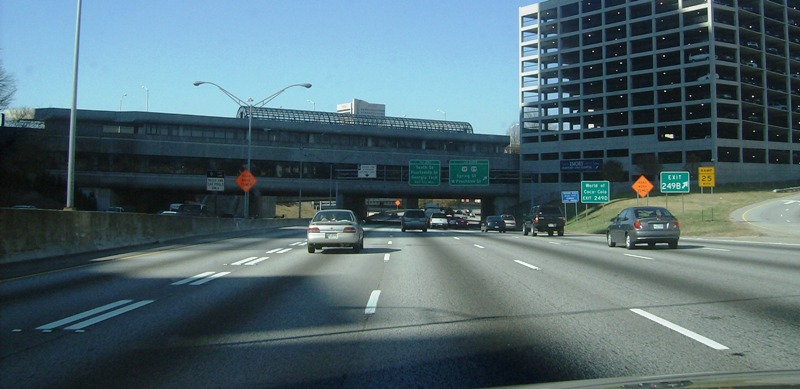
Image from I-75/85, showing its elevation above the highway

Civic Center station is located in SoNo, a sub-district of Downtown, with convenient access to the southern end of Midtown Atlanta. The station is named after the now-closed Atlanta Civic Center three blocks east at Piedmont Avenue NE, Centennial Hill, Emory University Hospital Midtown, Peachtree Summit and SunTrust Plaza skyscrapers to the south. Nearby tourist attractions are Centennial Olympic Park, National Center for Civil and Human Rights, The World of Coca-Cola, and The Georgia Aquarium.

== Station layout ==
S	Street Level	Entrance/Exit
2F; Platform level	Side platform, doors will open on the right
2F; Platform level	Southbound	← Red Line, Gold Line toward Airport (Peachtree Center)
2F; Platform level	Northbound	Gold Line toward Doraville (North Avenue) → Red Line toward North Springs (North Avenue) →
2F; Platform level	Side platform, doors will open on the right
1F	Underpass Level	Underpass between platforms
G	Freeway Level	Downtown Connector

Civic Center has a unique layout compared to other stations of the MARTA system. Although the rest of the line in Downtown and Midtown is underground, the station is actually elevated, except for the extreme ends of the platforms, where the line once more becomes underground. This is because it lies perpendicular to and above the trench for the Downtown Connector (I-75/85). This station is among a very small number of subway stations in the world that are simultaneously above a highway and below street level, similar to the 174th–175th Streets station in The Bronx.

== Bus service ==
Civic Center station is served by the following MARTA bus routes:

- Route 816 - North Highland Avenue

The station is also served by CobbLinc, Ride Gwinnett, and Xpress commuter buses. Intercity bus service is available through FlixBus and Red Coach. Megabus intercity buses previously stopped at Civic Center until it ended Atlanta operations in 2024.

== Nearby Attractions ==
- World of Coca-Cola
- National Center for Civil and Human Rights
- Georgia Aquarium
- Pemberton Place
- Centennial Olympic Park
