= Lenox station (MARTA) =

MARTA rail station

NE7 Lenox
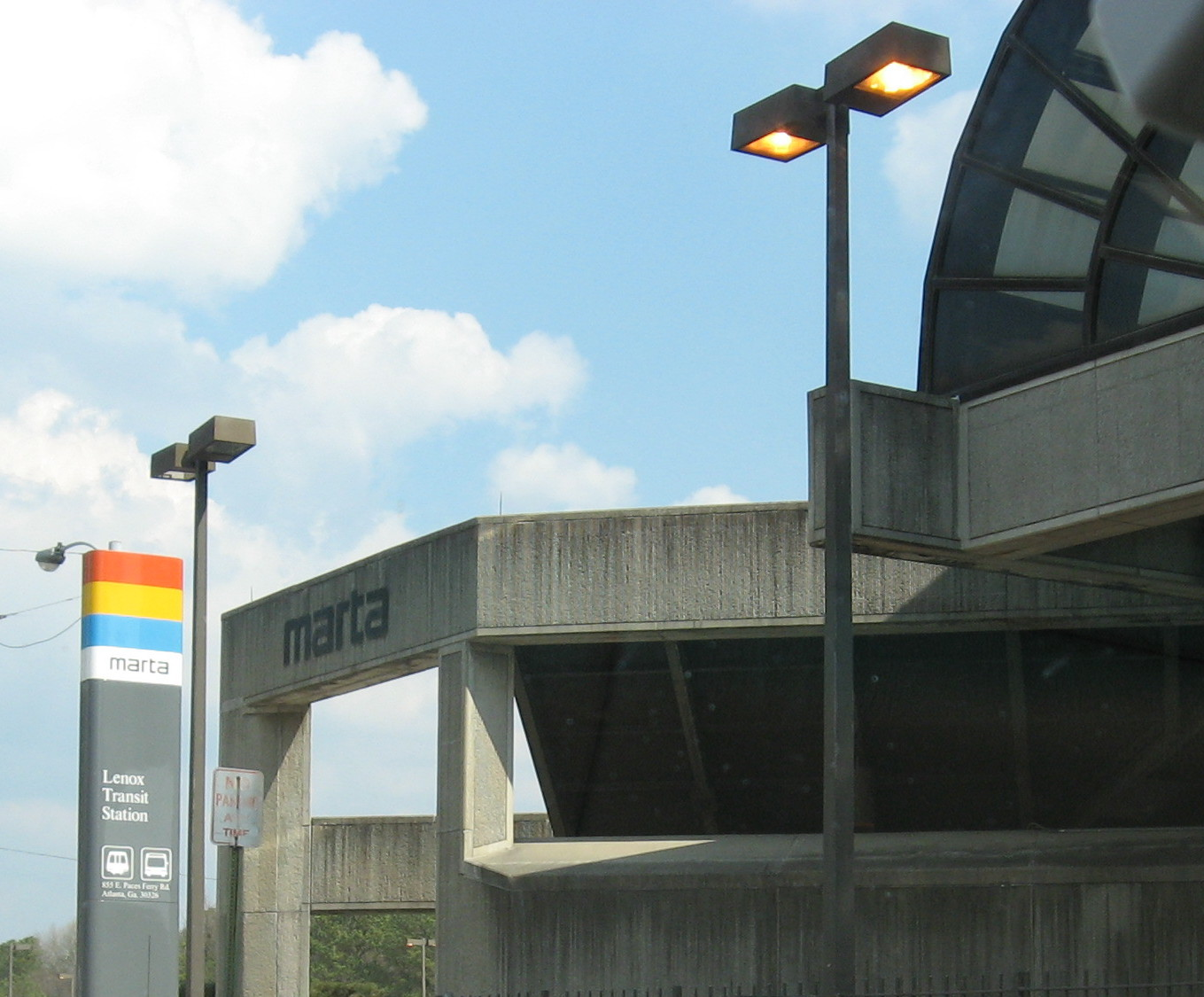

General information
- Location: 955 East Paces Ferry Road NE; Atlanta, Georgia 30326
- Coordinates: 33.847144°N 84.35631°W
- Platforms: 1 island platform
- Tracks: 2
- Connections: MARTA Bus: 27, Buc Shuttle

Construction
- Structure type: Open-cut
- Parking: 321 spaces
- Cycle facilities: No
- Accessible: Yes

Other information
- Station code: NE7

History
- Opened: December 15, 1984; 41 years ago

Services
Preceding station	MARTA	Following station
Lindbergh Center toward Airport	Gold Line	Brookhaven/Oglethorpe toward Doraville
Location

Lenox is an at-grade subway station in Atlanta, Georgia, serving the Gold Line of the Metropolitan Atlanta Rapid Transit Authority. Located in the Buckhead district, it provides access to Lenox Square and Phipps Plaza, which are located on Peachtree Street across the street from one another, as well as the nearby neighborhoods of Lenox Park and Pine Hills. It also provides connecting bus service to Piedmont Park, Atlanta Botanical Garden, and Ansley Mall.

This is the northernmost Gold Line station in Fulton County. Northeast of the station, the line crosses into DeKalb County.

== Station layout ==
G	Street Level	Entrance/Exit, station house
P Platform level	Westbound	← Gold Line toward Airport (Lindbergh Center)
P Platform level	Island platform, doors will open on the left
P Platform level	Eastbound	Gold Line toward Doraville (Brookhaven/Oglethorpe) →

== History ==
The station was built on the site of Johnsontown, a small community of about 30 African American families originally settled in 1912. The properties were acquired in the early 1980s and the houses razed to make way for the station. The station opened in 1984 when the Northeast Line (now Gold) was extended from Arts Center to Brookhaven (now Brookhaven/Oglethorpe).

Initially, the code was N7. But in 1994, it was changed to NE7.

== Parking ==
Lenox has both a parking lot (193 spaces) and parking deck (128 spaces) for MARTA patrons.

== Nearby landmarks and popular destinations ==
- Lenox Square
- Phipps Plaza

== Bus routes ==
The station is served by the following MARTA bus routes:

- Route 27 - Cheshire Bridge Road

== Connections to other transit systems ==
- Buc Shuttle
