= Brookhaven/Oglethorpe station =

MARTA rail station

NE8 Brookhaven/Oglethorpe Univ.
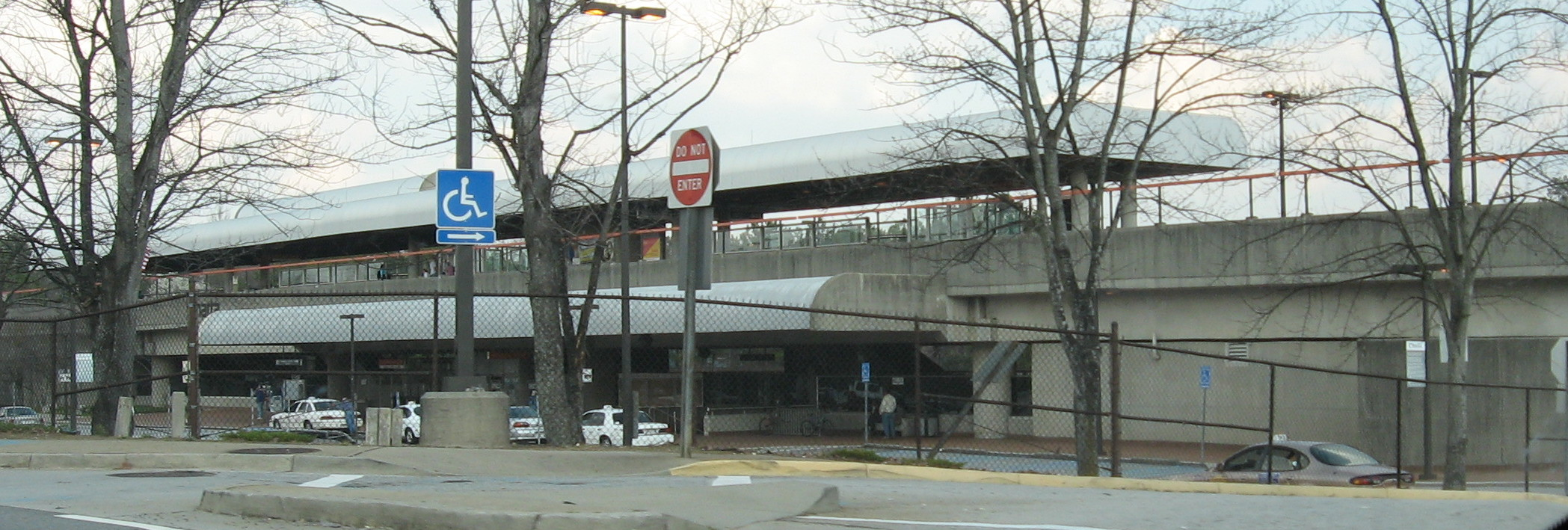

General information
- Location: 4047 Peachtree Road NE; Brookhaven, Georgia 30319; United States
- Coordinates: 33.860705°N 84.340003°W
- Platforms: 1 island platform
- Tracks: 2
- Connections: MARTA Bus: 8, 25, 47, 110

Construction
- Structure type: Elevated
- Parking: 1,252 spaces
- Cycle facilities: 18 spaces
- Accessible: Yes

Other information
- Station code: NE8

History
- Opened: December 15, 1984; 41 years ago
- Former names: Brookhaven (1984–1995)

Services
Preceding station	MARTA	Following station
Lenox toward Airport	Gold Line	Chamblee toward Doraville
Location

Brookhaven/Oglethorpe (originally Brookhaven and signed Brookhaven/Oglethorpe Univ. on station signs) is a subway station in Brookhaven, Georgia, on the Gold Line of the Metropolitan Atlanta Rapid Transit Authority (MARTA) rail system. An elevated station, it is located one mile south of Oglethorpe University. The station provides connecting bus service to North Druid Hills, Toco Hills, North DeKalb Mall, the Peachtree Boulevard business district, and the Georgia Department of Labor. South of this station, the line crosses into Fulton County.

In the 2010s, the station was planned to become a "city center" for Brookhaven on the property composed of mixed use, office, retail, civic and public space. The plan was canceled in 2017.

== Station layout ==
P Platform level	Westbound	← Gold Line toward Airport (Lenox)
P Platform level	Island platform, doors will open on the left
P Platform level	Eastbound	Gold Line toward Doraville (Chamblee) →
G	Street Level	Entrance/Exit, station house

== Parking ==
Brookhaven/Oglethorpe has 1,252 daily and long term parking spaces available for MARTA users, located in paved parking lots.

== Development ==
MARTA and the City of Brookhaven planned to build a transit-oriented "city center" on the station's parking lot in 2014. The proposal entailed a development composed of mixed uses, offices, retailers, and civic and public space. The project was canceled in early 2017, after plans by Brookhaven's mayor to suspend their work on the project and delay rezoning and tax incentives for the property's development.

== Landmarks and popular destinations ==
- Oglethorpe University

== Bus routes ==
The station is served by the following MARTA bus routes:

- Route 8 - North Druid Hills Road
- Route 25 - Peachtree Industrial Boulevard
- Route 47 - I-85 Access Road / Briarwood Road
- Route 110 - Peachtree Road / Buckhead
