= East Point station =

MARTA rail station

S5 East Point
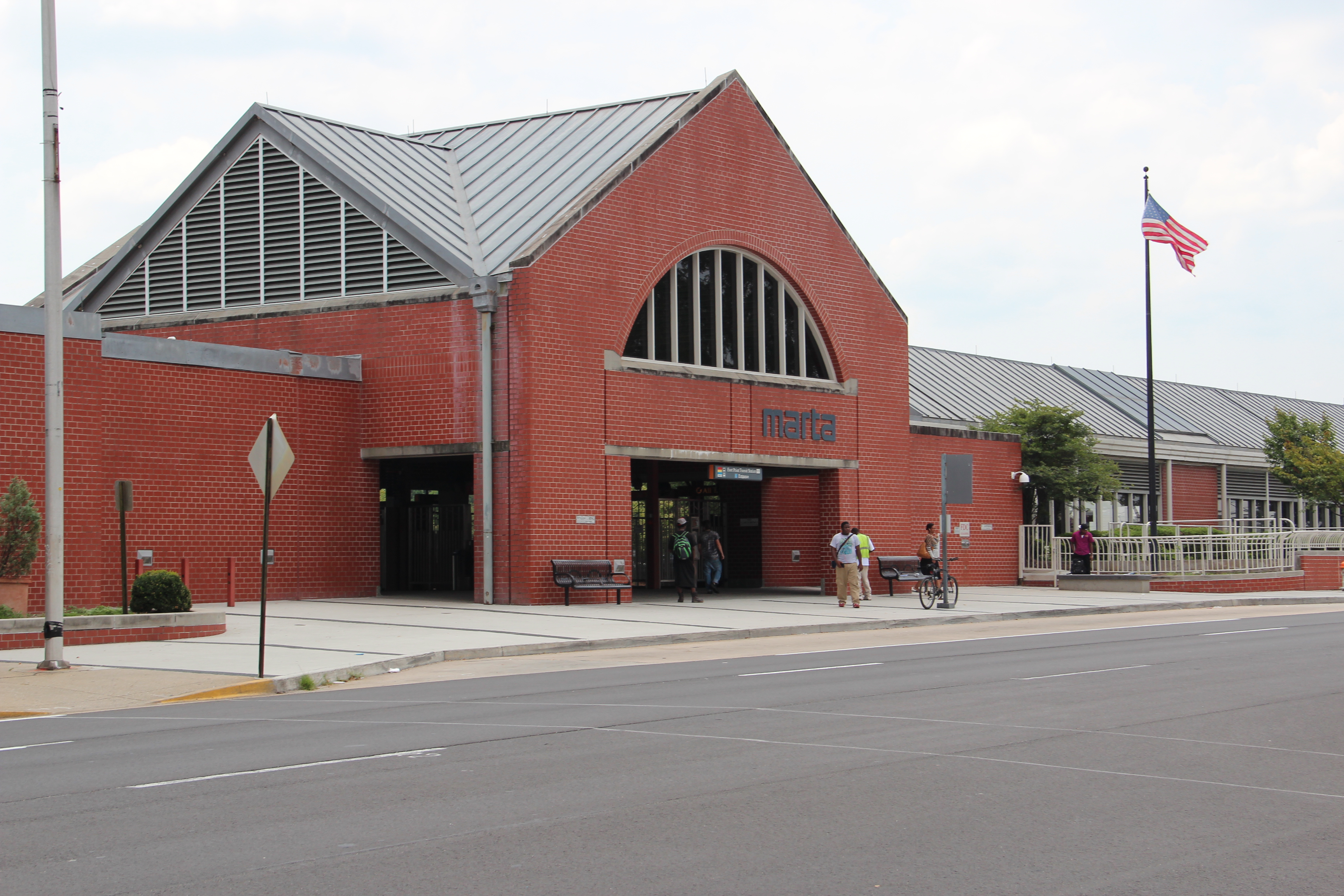

General information
- Location: 2848 East Main Street; East Point, GA 30344
- Coordinates: 33.677814°N 84.440344°W
- Platforms: 1 island platform
- Tracks: 2
- Connections: MARTA Bus: 78, 79, 81, 84, 93, 181, 192, 193

Construction
- Structure type: Open-cut
- Parking: 927 spaces
- Cycle facilities: 8 spaces
- Accessible: YES

Other information
- Station code: S5

History
- Opened: August 16, 1986; 40 years ago

Passengers
- 2013: 4,571 (avg. weekday) ▲1%

Services
| Preceding station | MARTA | Following station |
|---|---|---|
| College Park toward Airport | Red Line | Lakewood/Fort McPherson toward North Springs |
| College Park toward Airport | Gold Line | Lakewood/Fort McPherson toward Doraville |
Proposed Services
| Preceding station | MARTA | Following station |
|---|---|---|
| Terminus | Clayton County Commuter Rail | Hapeville toward Lovejoy |
Location

East Point is a subway station in East Point, Georgia, serving the Red and Gold lines of the Metropolitan Atlanta Rapid Transit Authority (MARTA) rail system. It has an island platform between two tracks. It was opened on August 16, 1986.

It mainly serves East Point, Camp Creek, and unincorporated South Fulton and College Park.

This station provides access to downtown East Point historic dining-shopping-urban renewal district, and East Point Public Library. Bus service is provided at this station to Atlanta Medical Center-South Campus, Brownsmill Golf Course, Point University, Fulton County Board of Education, Camp Creek Market Place, Fulton HJC Bowden Senior Center, Cleveland Avenue and Grady East Point Health Center. The proposed Clayton County commuter rail service will use it as the terminal, although it is on hold.

== Station layout ==
| G | Street Level | Entrance/Exit, station house, fare barriers, bus loops |
| P Platform level | Southbound | ← Red Line, Gold Line toward Airport (College Park) |
| P Platform level | Island platform, doors will open on the left |
| P Platform level | Northbound | Gold Line toward Doraville (Lakewood / Fort McPherson) → Red Line toward North Springs (Lakewood / Fort McPherson) → |

== Bus service ==
The station is served by the following MARTA bus routes:

- Route 78 - Cleveland Avenue
- Route 79 - Sylvan Hills
- Route 80 - Headland Drive / Sandtown
- Route 81- Venetian Hills / Delowe Drive
- Route 84 - Washington Road / Camp Creek Marketplace
- Route 93 - Headland Drive / Main Street
- Route 181 - Washington Road / Fairburn
- Route 192 - Old Dixie / Tara Boulevard
- Route 193 - Morrow / Jonesboro
