= Lakewood/Fort McPherson station =

MARTA rail station

S4 Lakewood / Fort McPherson
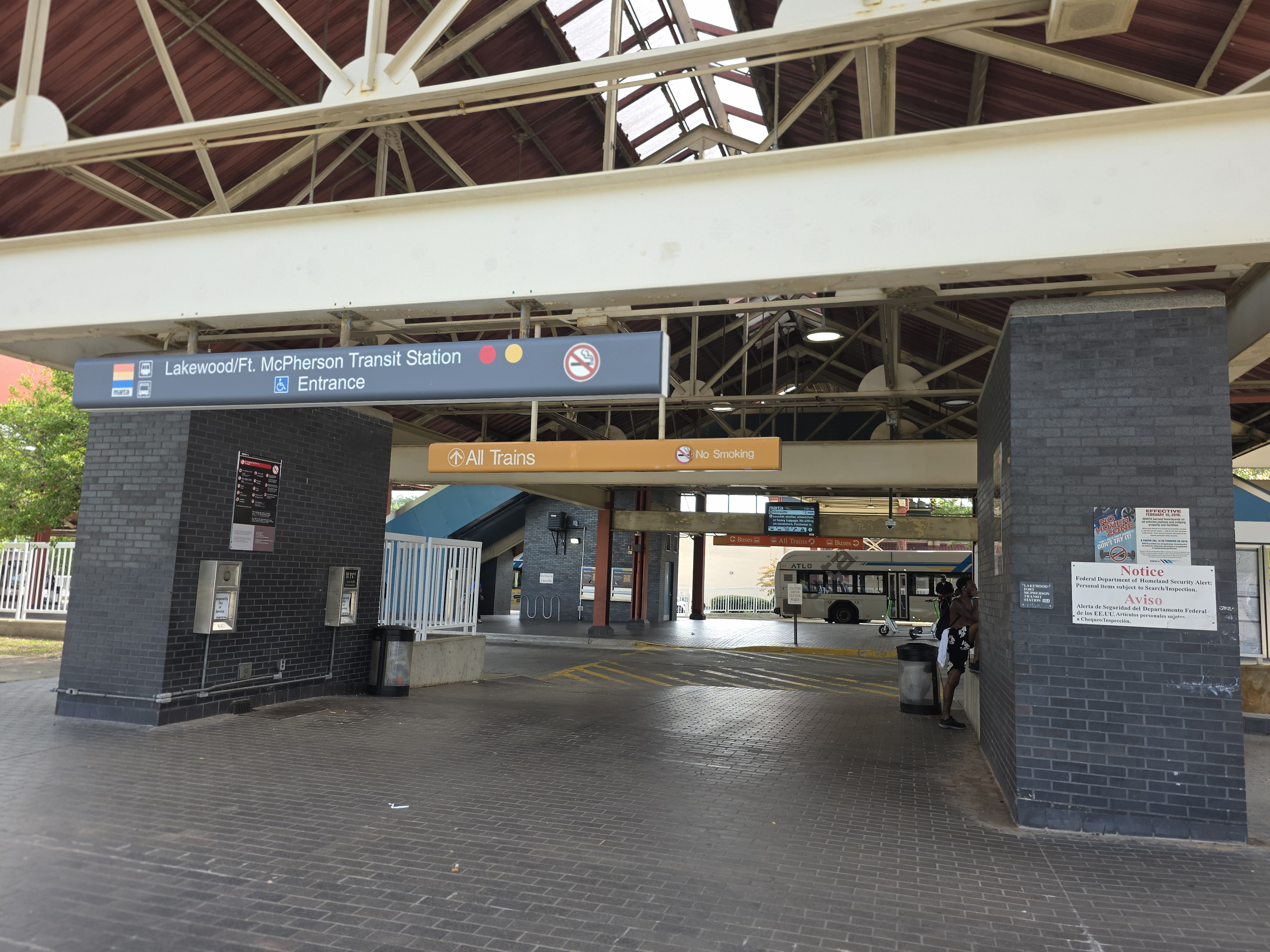
- Lakewood/Fort McPherson station entrance

General information
- Location: 2020 Lee Street SW; Atlanta, GA 30310
- Coordinates: 33.700457°N 84.428859°W
- Platforms: 1 island platform
- Tracks: 2
- Connections: MARTA Bus: 42, 178, 183, 191, 194

Construction
- Structure type: Embankment
- Parking: 1,134 spaces; daily parking
- Cycle facilities: 8 spaces
- Accessible: YES

Other information
- Station code: S4

History
- Opened: December 15, 1984; 41 years ago

Passengers
- 2013: 2,207 (avg. weekday) ▲6%

Services
Preceding station	MARTA	Following station
East Point toward Airport	Red Line	Oakland City toward North Springs
East Point toward Airport	Gold Line	Oakland City toward Doraville
Location

Lakewood / Fort McPherson is an American subway station in Atlanta and East Point, Georgia, serving the Red and Gold lines of the Metropolitan Atlanta Rapid Transit Authority (MARTA) rail system. It has an island platform between two tracks. It opened on December 15, 1984. The set up for this station is like many on the East-West line. In a similar layout to that of Oakland City, the road adjacent to the station must be traversed for station access; in the case of Lakewood/Fort MacPherson, a bridge over the roadway is utilized rather than an underpass.

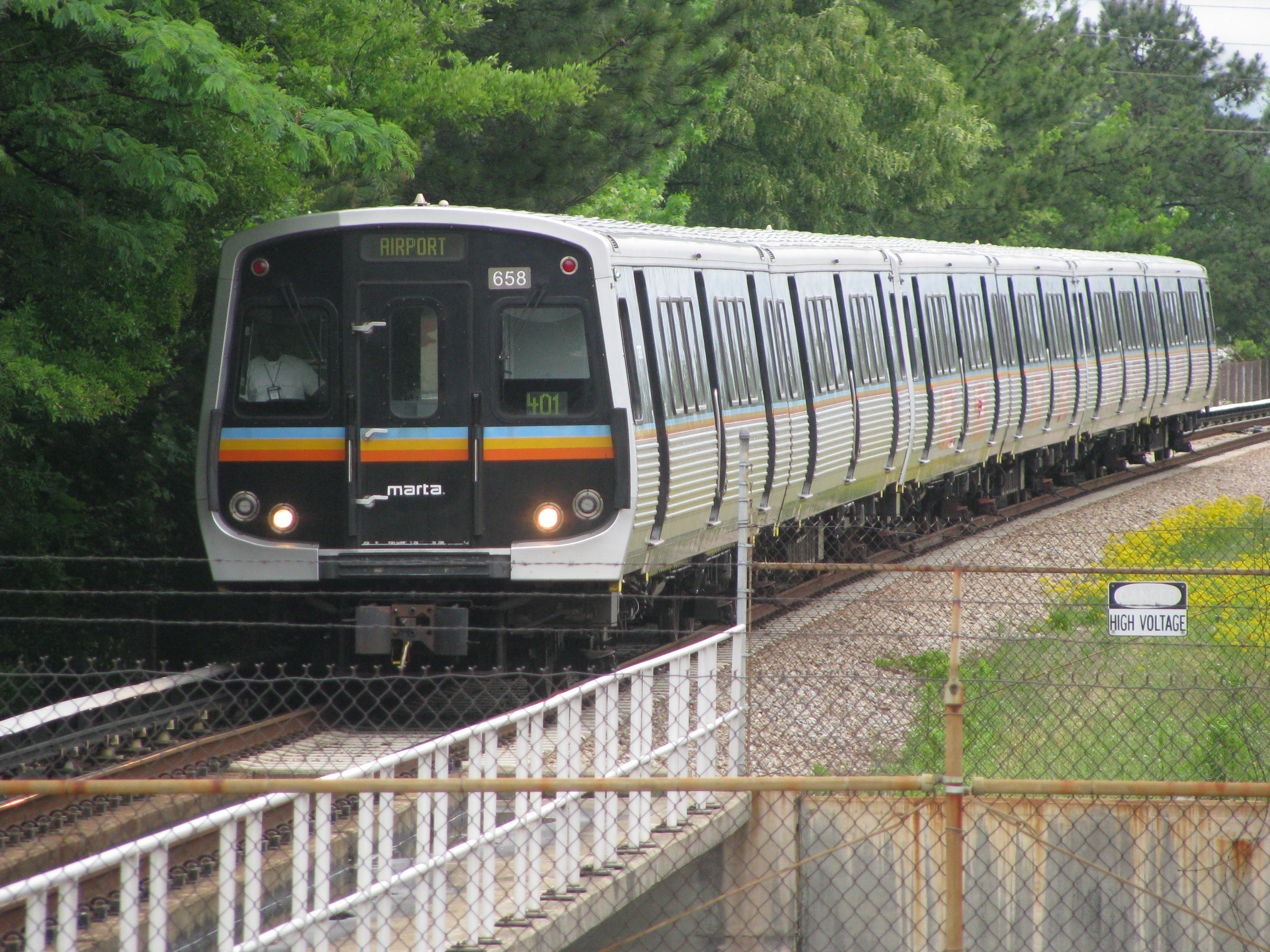
Breda CQ312 approaching Lakewood Station on southbound service to the Airport

As the name suggests, it provides access to the historic Fort McPherson (now Tyler Perry Studios), and Lakewood. Bus service is provided to the Barge Road Park & Ride, Greenbriar Mall, Southside Industrial Park, and Cellairis Amphitheatre.

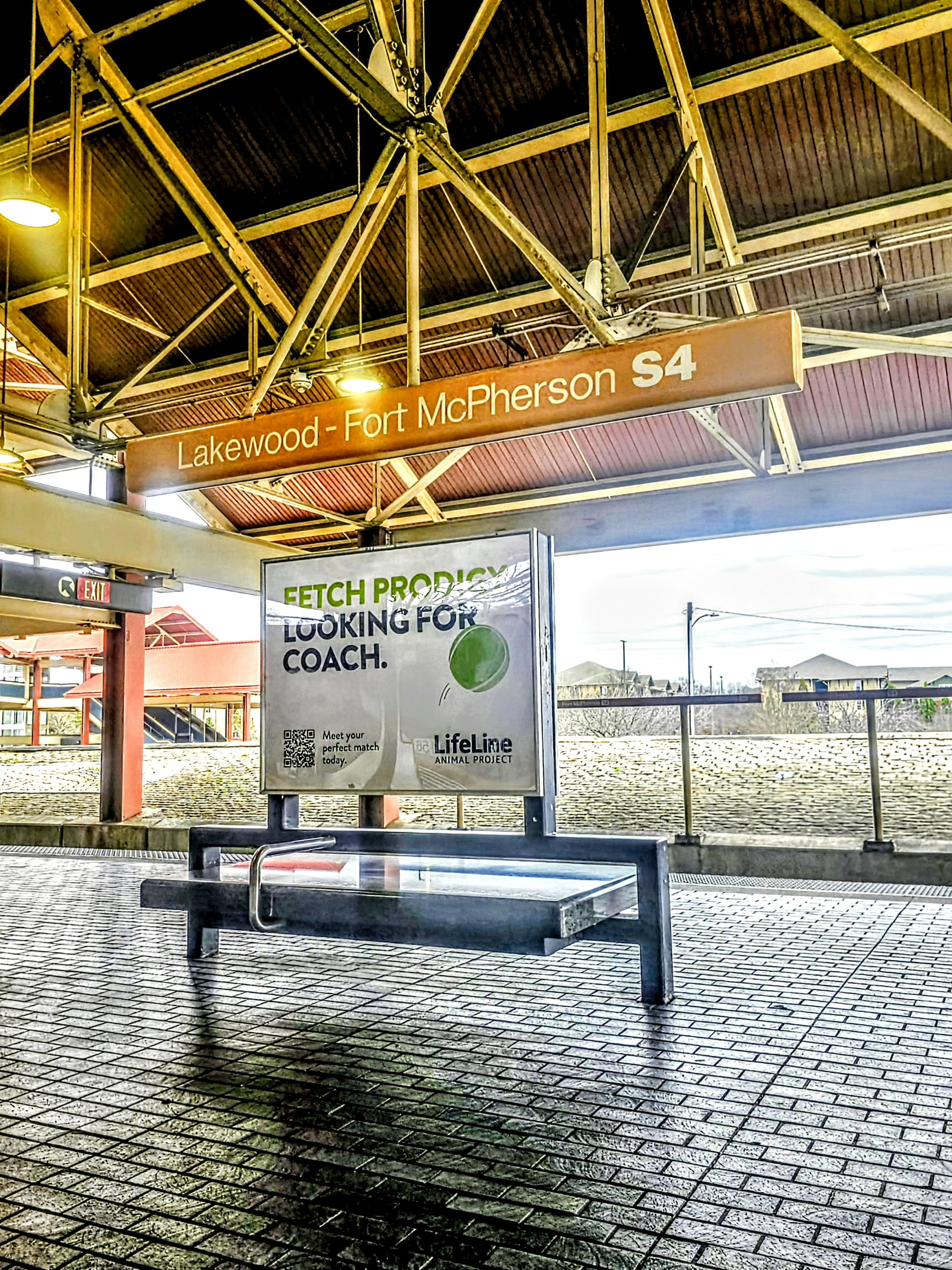
Sign of Lakewood/Fort McPherson

== Station layout ==
M	Mezzanine	Crossover to platform
P Platform level	Southbound	← Red Line, Gold Line toward Airport (East Point)
P Platform level	Island platform, doors will open on the left
P Platform level	Northbound	Gold Line toward Doraville (Oakland City) → Red Line toward North Springs (Oakland City) →
G	Street Level	Entrance/Exit, fare barriers, bus loops

== Bus routes ==
The station is served by the following MARTA bus routes:

- Route 42 - Pryor Street / McDaniel Street
- Route 178 - Empire Boulevard / Southside Industrial Park
- Route 183 - Barge Road Park & Ride / Lakewood
- Route 191 - Riverdale / ATL International Terminal.
- Route 194 - Conley Road / Mt. Zion.
