= Oakland City =

Oakland City may refer to:

- Oakland City (Atlanta), a neighborhood in Atlanta, Georgia
  - Oakland City (MARTA station)
- Oakland City, Indiana
  - Oakland City University, a four-year college located in Oakland City, Indiana
- Oakland, California
