= College Park station (MARTA) =

MARTA rail station in Georgia, US

S6 College Park
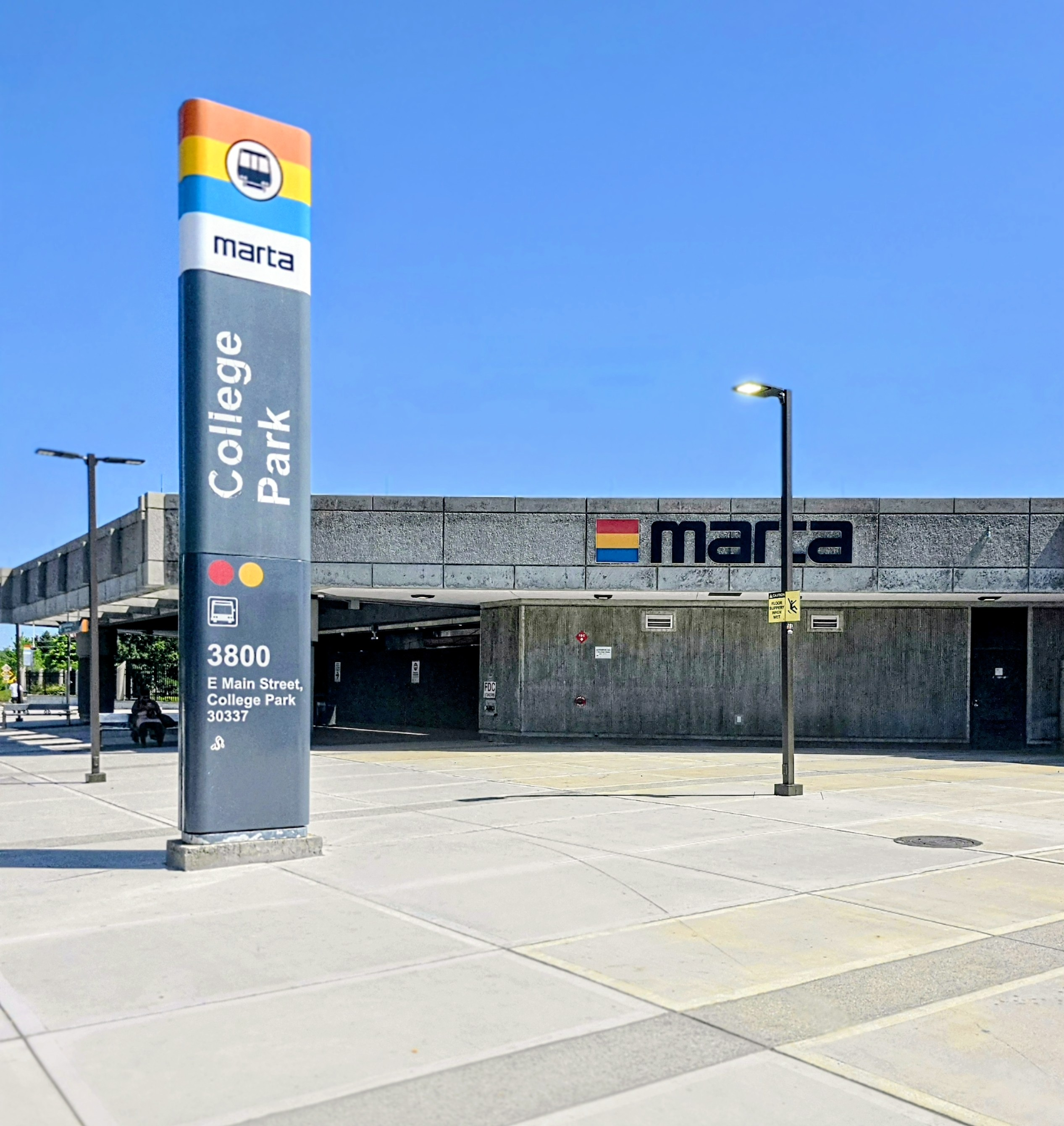
- The west entrance to College Park station

General information
- Location: 3800 Main Street; College Park, GA 30337, U.S.
- Coordinates: 33.651673°N 84.448793°W
- Owner: MARTA
- Platforms: 1 island platform
- Tracks: 2
- Connections: MARTA Bus: 82, 89, 93, 172, 180, 189, 195, 196

Construction
- Structure type: Open-cut
- Parking: 1,883 daily parking spaces 88 long-term parking spaces
- Cycle facilities: 6 spaces
- Accessible: YES

Other information
- Station code: S6

History
- Opened: June 18, 1988; 38 years ago

Passengers
- 2019: 8,061 (avg. weekday)

Services
Preceding station	MARTA	Following station
Airport Terminus	Red Line	East Point toward North Springs
Airport Terminus	Gold Line	East Point toward Doraville
Location

College Park is a subway station in College Park, Georgia, United States, serving the Red and Gold lines of the Metropolitan Atlanta Rapid Transit Authority (MARTA) rail system. It opened on June 18, 1988. This station mainly serves College Park and surrounding areas, including Hartsfield–Jackson Atlanta International Airport, Morrow, Riverdale, Clayton County, and South Fulton.

In 2019, College Park station had 8,061 average weekday entries, falling behind Peachtree Center station to become MARTA rail's fourth-busiest station, behind the Five Points and Airport stations.

== Location ==
College Park station lies in triangle-shaped area bounded immediately by Main Street, Columbia Avenue, and Lee Street in the downtown of College Park. The station sits on the western edge of Hartsfield–Jackson Atlanta International Airport, but areas to the north and west of the station are residential beyond the historic downtown of College Park. Other notable locations nearby College Park station include the Georgia International Convention Center to the southwest, Badgett Stadium just west of downtown, the Federal Aviation Administration (FAA) Eastern Service Center immediately north of the station, and Woodward Academy. Interstate 85 divides the station area and the Atlanta Airport. The station's location along that highway and its large parking lot draw in commuters, especially because of its position as the southernmost rail station on the Metropolitan Atlanta Rapid Transit Authority (MARTA) network to have a dedicated park and ride facility.

== History ==
During early planning of the MARTA rail system in 1971, College Park station was planned to occupy property in College Park along Yale Avenue. That site was rendered unable to be developed to any more than parking after it became part of the clear zone for the then-proposed Runway 8L/26R of William B. Hartsfield Atlanta Airport and Interstate 85 was shifted west to make room for the runway. The acquisition left planners uncertain about the location of the proposed station. A 1975 study determined that expansion of the rail network to the airport would cost $30-56 million more than initially planned. The eventual site of the station on Columbia Avenue was expected to cost MARTA $30 million for its extension to the airport from East Point station based on the 1975 study. On February 11, 1986, MARTA approved a $22.5 million contract for the construction of the 45,200 square feet (4,200 m^{2}) station.

College Park station was opened on June 18, 1988, along with Airport station. The Airport station building was built 8 years earlier along with the Midfield Airport Terminal, but remained unfinished and separated from the rest of the MARTA system until College Park station was built to connect the two stations. The College Park station facilities cost $16 million to build and featured a parking lot with 2,123 spaces for daily parking only. At the time of the parking lot's completion, it was the largest parking lot in the MARTA system.

The large parking lot became a site for car thefts and other crimes, this was addressed in 1998 when MARTA moved its police precinct to College Park station. The new precinct and watchtower also reduced the size of the parking lot. Long-term parking was introduced at College Park station the following year, with 1,754 daily spots and 290 long-term spots. In early 2025 MARTA upgraded the parking gates at the station's long-term lot with license plate cameras, new gates, and new fee payment machines compatible with Breeze Card to enhance traffic flow, eventually allow for payments through the Breeze app, and improve safety.

== Station layout ==
College Park Station has 1,883 daily parking spaces and 88 long-term parking spaces. MARTA Bus routes 82, 93, 172, and 180 can be accessed via the north bus bays and routes 89, 189, 195, and 196 via the south bus bays. The buses serve Camp Creek Parkway, Georgia International Convention Center, Old National Highway, Southlake Mall, South Fulton Park & Ride, Fairburn, Palmetto, Sylvan Hills, Union City, Clayton County and Riverdale.

G	Street Level	Entrance/Exit, fare barriers, bus loops
P Platform level	Southbound	← Red Line, Gold Line toward Airport (Terminus)
P Platform level	Island platform, doors will open on the left
P Platform level	Northbound	Gold Line toward Doraville (East Point) → Red Line toward North Springs (East Point) →

=== Art ===
MARTA commissioned a nickel-bronze sculpture by Georgia State University professor George Beasley in 1988 for the station. The sculpture, named Untitled Landscape, is mounted on a concrete wall of the station.
