= Chamblee station =

MARTA rail station

NE9 Chamblee
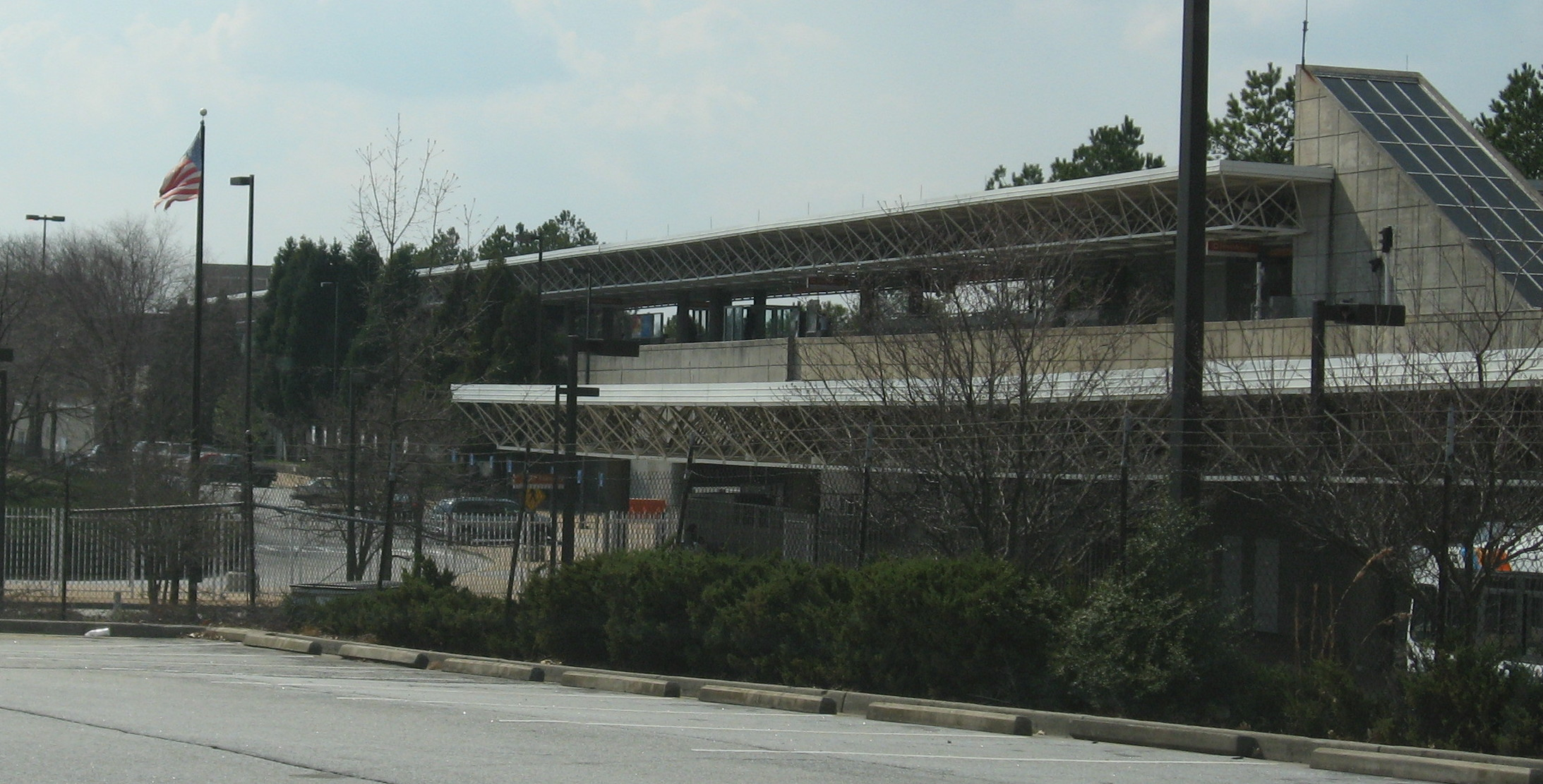
- Chamblee station in March 2007

General information
- Location: 5200 New Peachtree Road; Chamblee, Georgia
- Coordinates: 33°53′13″N 84°18′26″W
- Platforms: 1 island platform
- Tracks: 2
- Connections: MARTA Bus: 19, 47, 103, 126, 132, 825

Construction
- Structure type: Elevated
- Parking: 1,713 daily parking spaces
- Cycle facilities: 6 spaces
- Accessible: Yes

Other information
- Station code: NE9

History
- Opened: December 19, 1987

Services
Preceding station	MARTA	Following station
Brookhaven/Oglethorpe toward Airport	Gold Line	Doraville Terminus
Location

Chamblee station is a metro station in Chamblee, Georgia, serving the Gold Line of the Metropolitan Atlanta Rapid Transit Authority (MARTA) rail system. The station opened on December 19, 1987, as a $23 million extension of the line.

Chamblee station has a single elevated island platform serving two tracks. It is made of light-colored concrete with white enamel wall panels. The station has three pieces of public art:

- Moving in the Light (1987) by Barbara Brokzik: Porcelain tiles with silk-screened paper designs
- Hold the Ladder (2023) by Lauren Pallotta Stumberg: Mural
- Metaphysica (2024) by Phil Proctor: Steel sculpture
