= West End station (MARTA) =

MARTA rail station

S2 West End
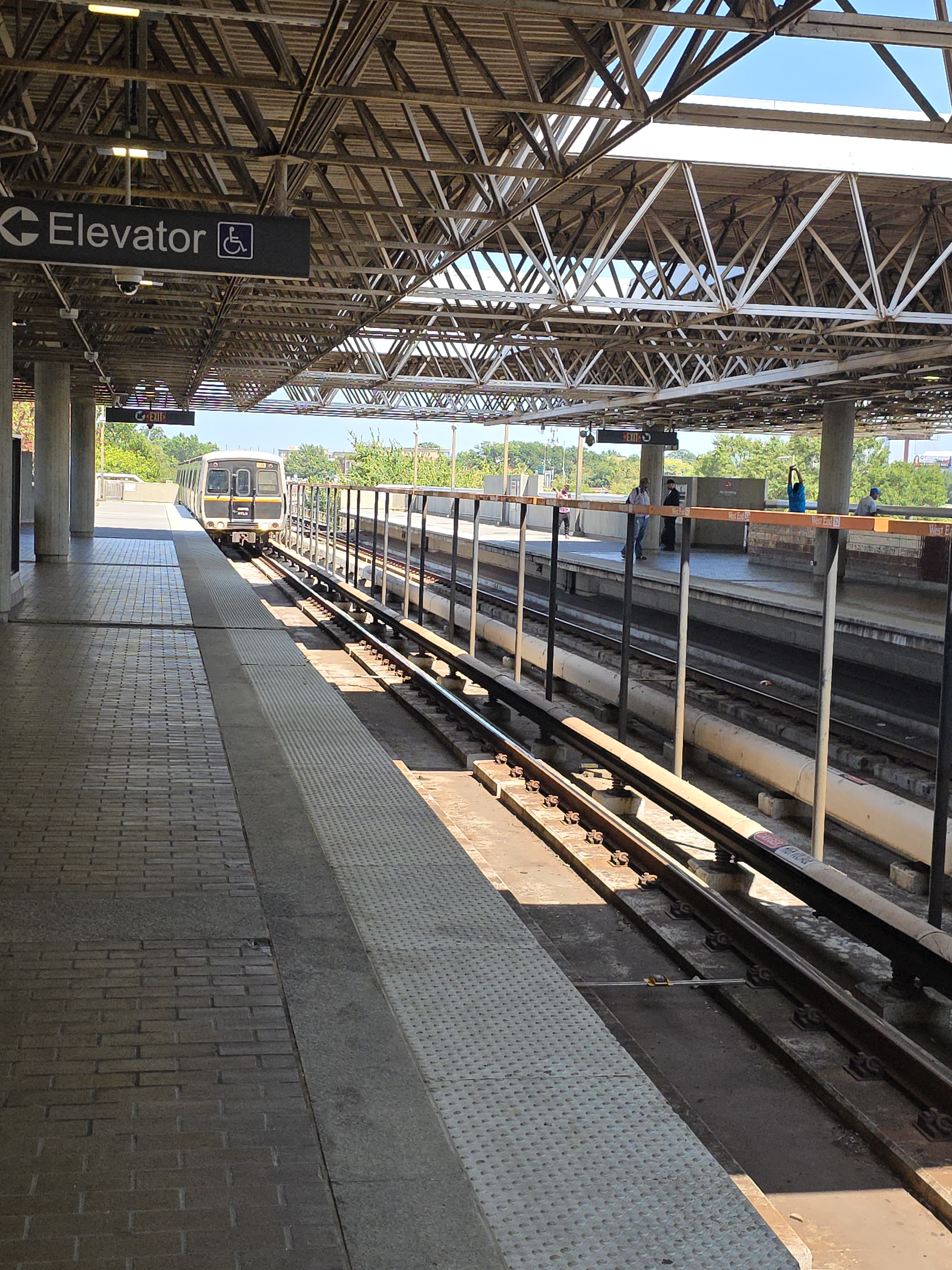
- Southbound train approaching the station

General information
- Location: 680 Lee Street SW; Atlanta, Georgia 30310
- Coordinates: 33.73581°N 84.41296°W
- Platforms: 2 side platforms
- Tracks: 2
- Connections: MARTA Bus: 1, 40, 58, 68, 71, 81, 94, 95, 155, 832

Construction
- Structure type: Elevated
- Parking: 547 spaces; daily parking
- Cycle facilities: 10 spaces
- Accessible: YES

Other information
- Station code: S2

History
- Opened: December 11, 1982; 43 years ago

Passengers
- 2013: 7,056 (avg. weekday) ▼1%

Services
Preceding station	MARTA	Following station
Oakland City toward Airport	Red Line	Garnett toward North Springs
Oakland City toward Airport	Gold Line	Garnett toward Doraville
Location

West End is an elevated subway station on the Red and Gold lines of the Metropolitan Atlanta Rapid Transit Authority (MARTA) rail system servicing the West End and most of Southwest Atlanta, including neighborhoods bordering Cascade Road and Metropolitan Parkway. The West End station opened on December 11 on 1982

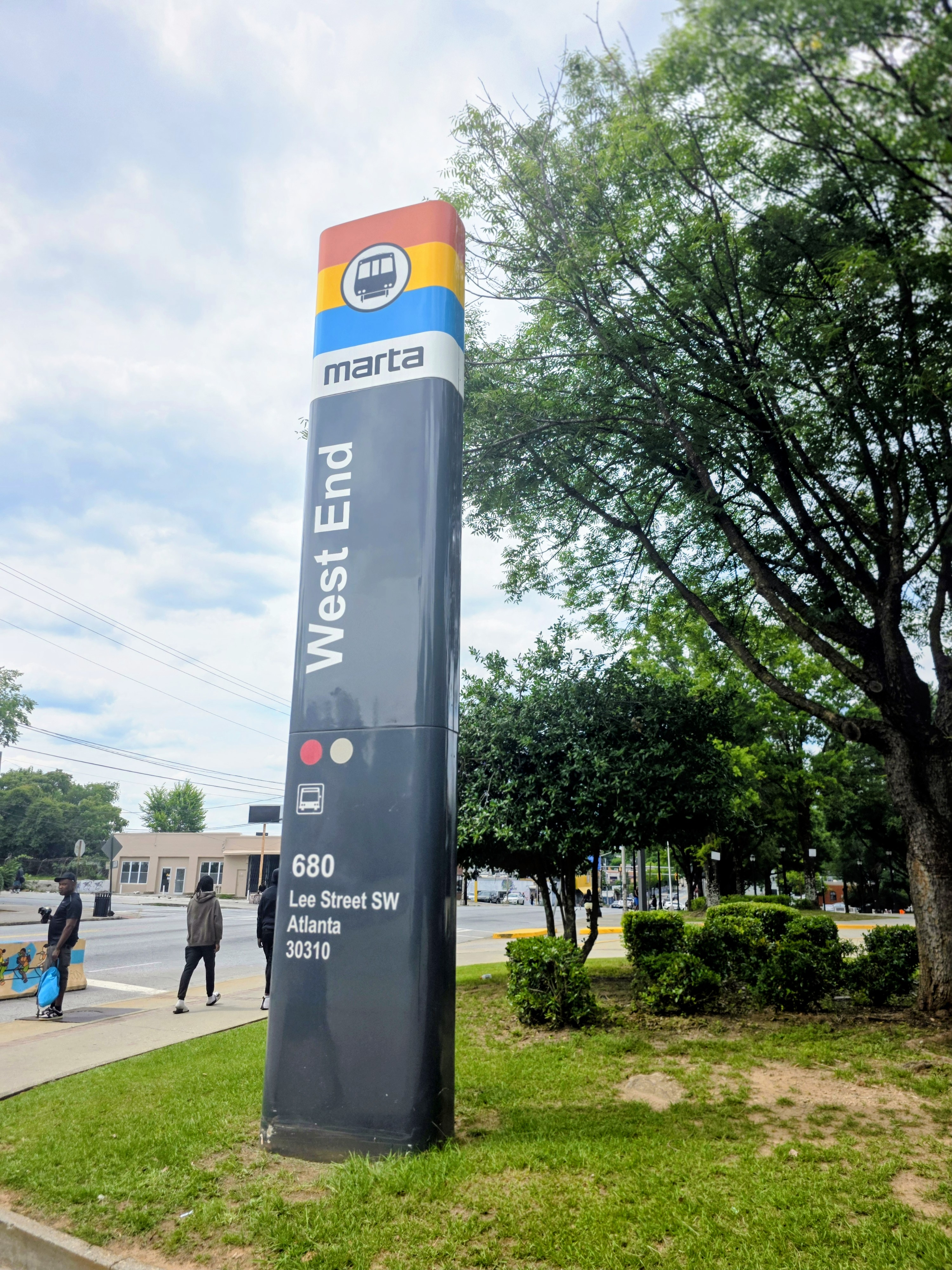
West End station sign

This station provides access to The Mall at Westend and the Woodruff Library Shuttle to Clark Atlanta University.

Bus service is provided at this station to Westend Medical Center, Joel Chandler Harris Home (the Wren's Nest), Hammonds House, The Salvation Army Evangeline Booth College, The Salvation Army Ray and Joan Kroc Center Atlanta, Atlanta Technical College, Atlanta Metropolitan College, The Salvation Army Firecrest Missioners Center, Spelman College, Morehouse School of Medicine, Morehouse College, Hapeville, Interdenominational Theological Center (ITC) and The Atlanta University Center.

== History ==
In 2001, the MARTA board voted to rename West End station in honor of Ralph David Abernathy. However, this decision was met with opposition at its public meeting. MARTA asked MARTOC, the state legislative oversight committee, for a recommendation on the renaming, but the committee was not able to produce a consensus opinion.

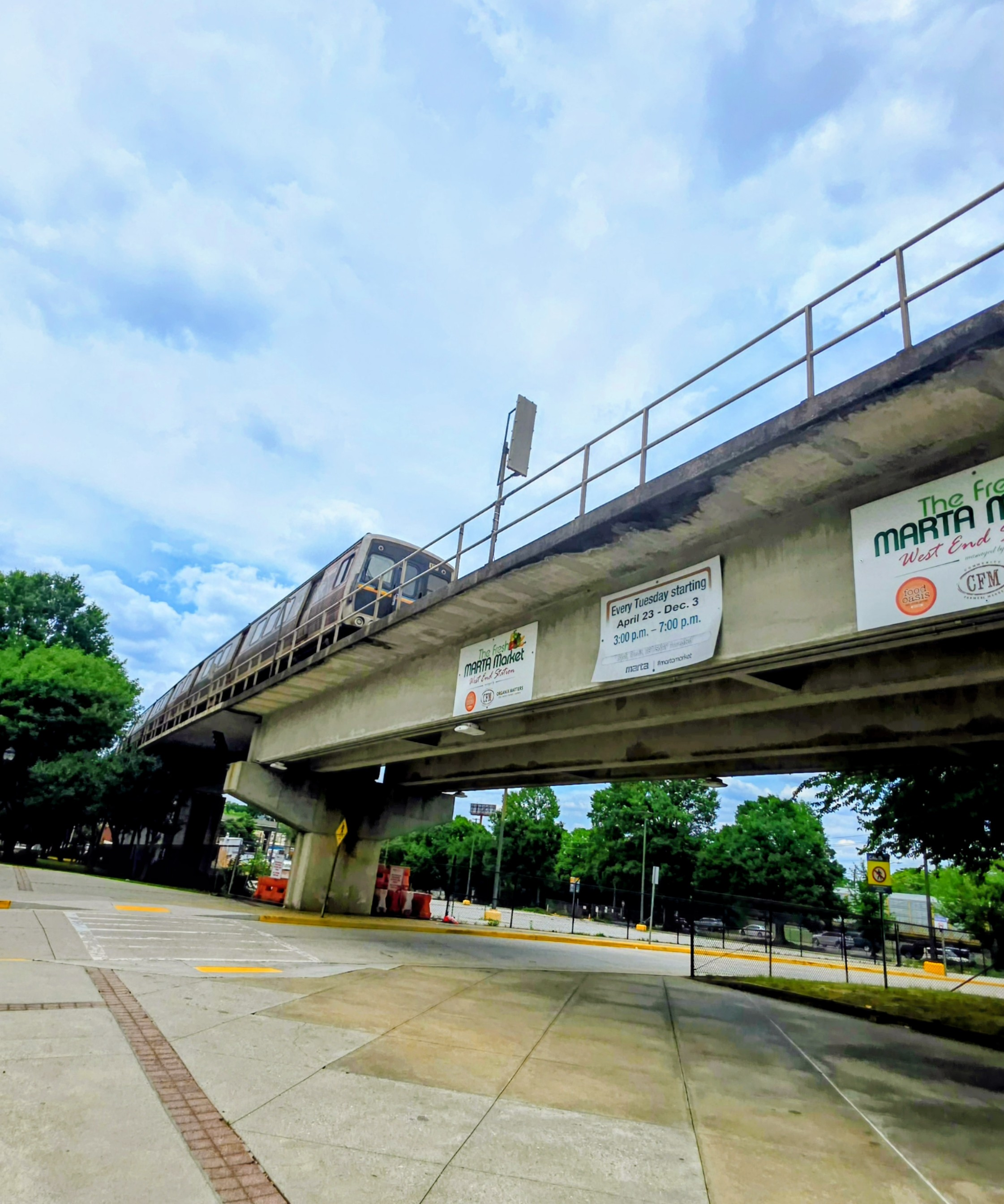
Train approaching southbound from below

== Station layout ==
P Platform level	Side platform, doors will open on the right
P Platform level	Southbound	← Red Line, Gold Line toward Airport (Oakland City)
P Platform level	Northbound	Gold Line toward Doraville (Garnett) → Red Line toward North Springs (Garnett) →
P Platform level	Side platform, doors will open on the right
G	Street Level	Entrance/Exit, fare barriers, station house, bus loops

== Bus routes ==
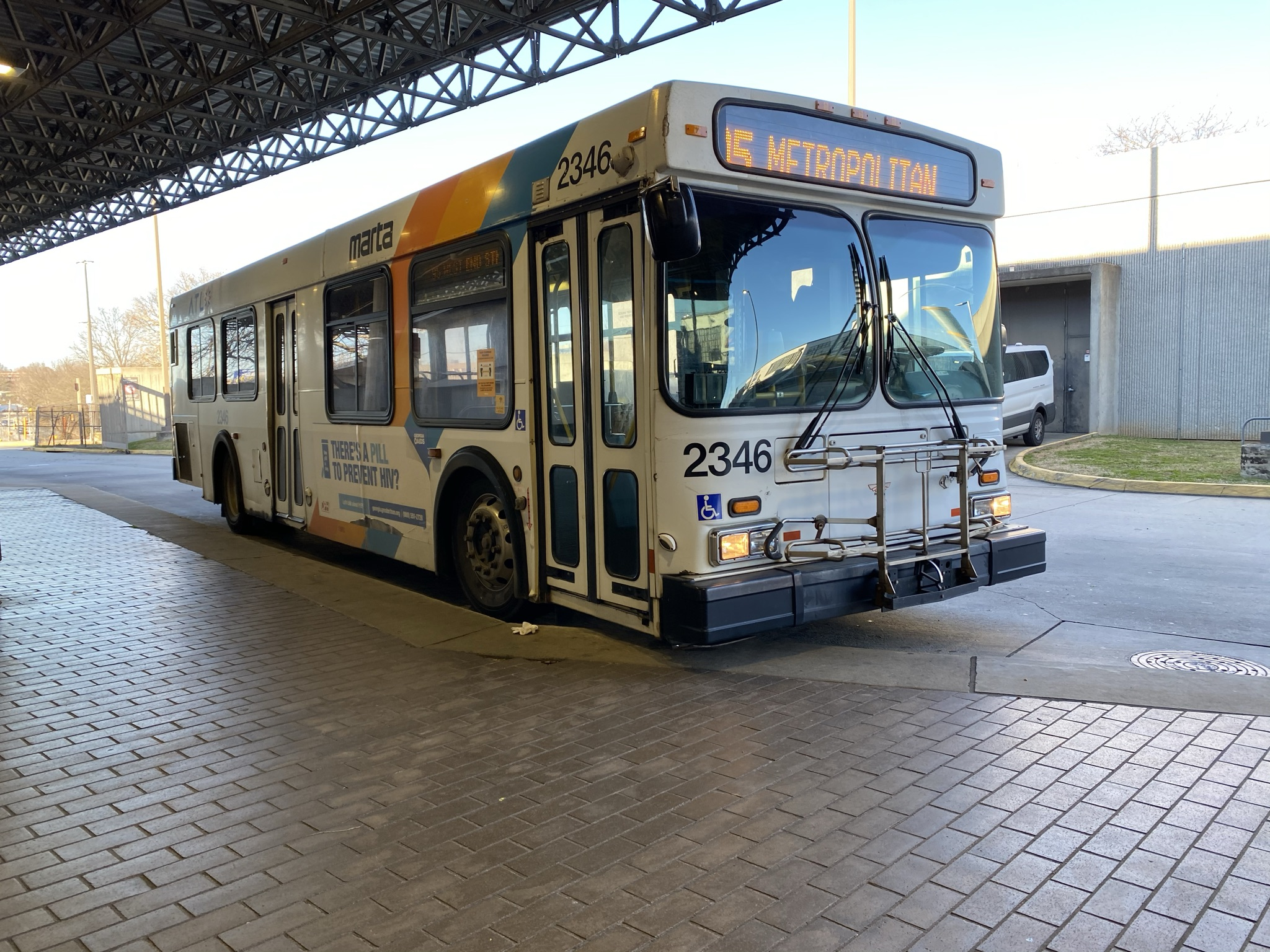
MARTA 95 Bus at West End Station to Hapeville

The station is served by the following MARTA bus routes:

- Route 1 - Marietta Blvd. / Joseph E Lowery Blvd.
- Route 40 - Peachtree Street / Downtown
- Route 58 - West Lake Avenue / Hollywood Road
- Route 68 - Benjamin E. Mays Drive
- Route 71 - Cascade Road
- Route 81 - Venetian Hills / Delowe Drive
- Route 94 - Northside Drive
- Route 95 - Metropolitan Parkway
- Route 155 - Pittsburgh
- Route 832 - Grant Park

Due to the Coronavirus Pandemic, MARTA is only providing service to routes 40, 71, and 95 until further notice.

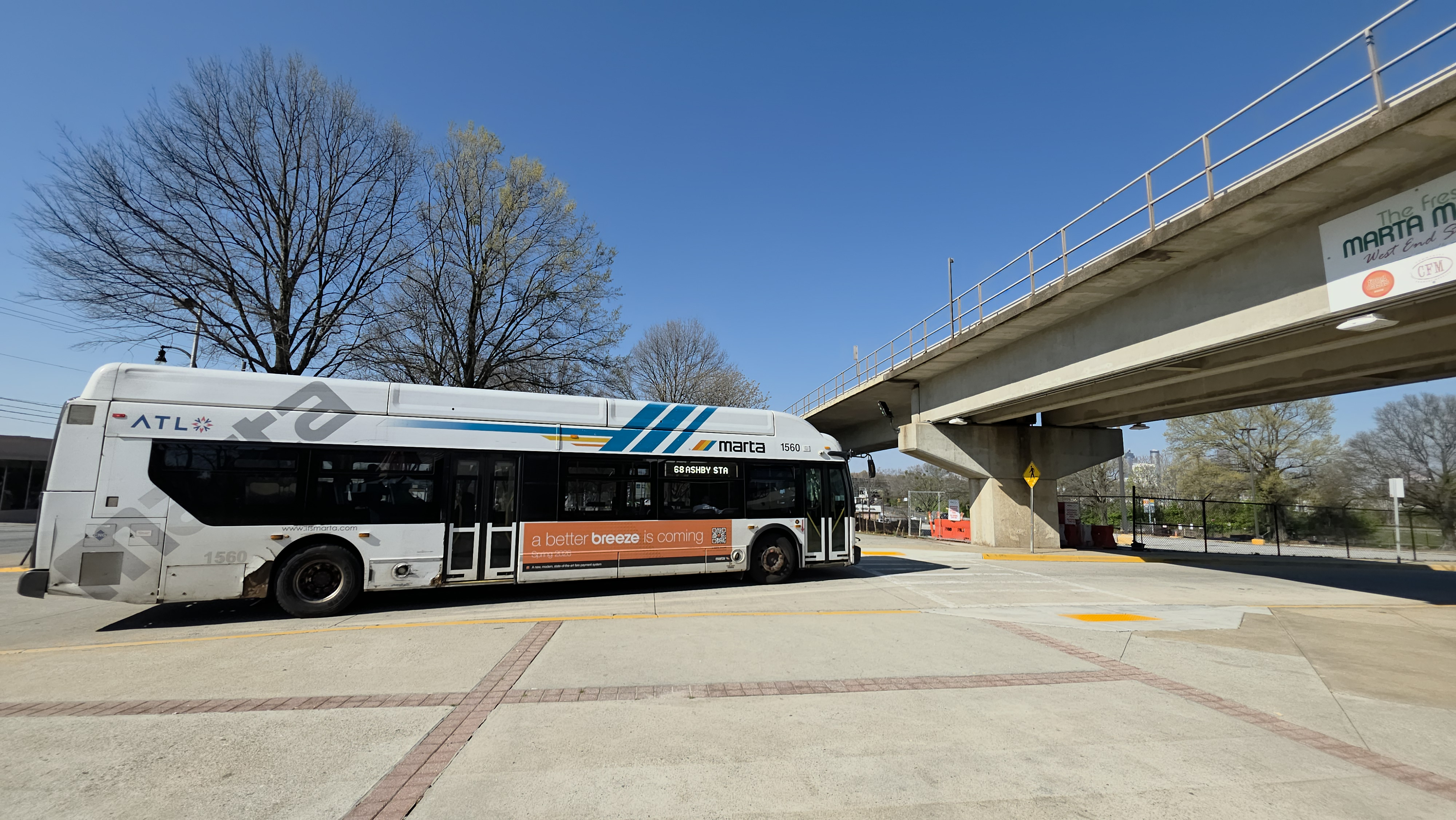
Route 68 to Ashby station
