= Oakland City station =

MARTA rail station

S3 Oakland City
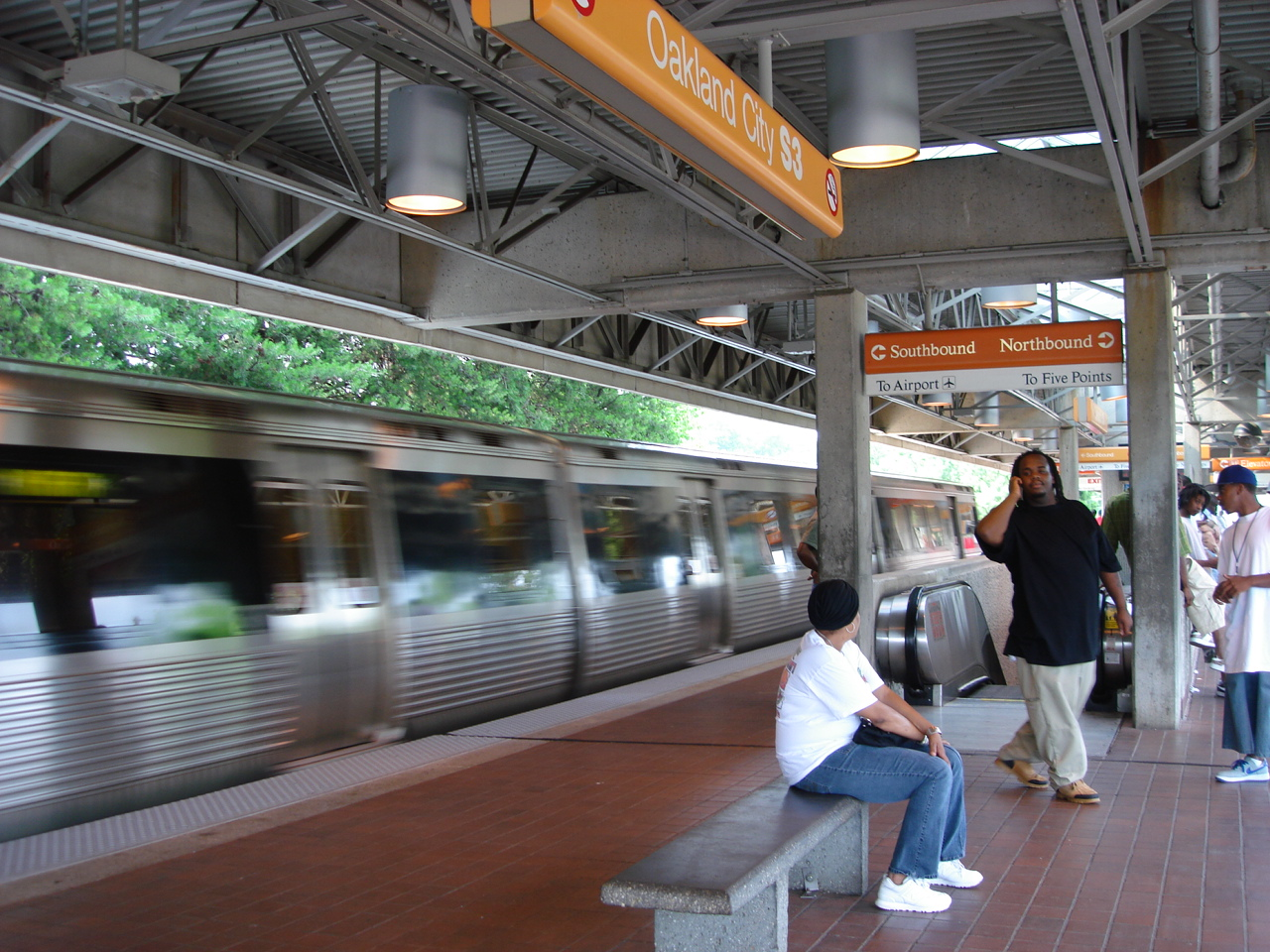
- Oakland City station in 2006

General information
- Location: 1400 Lee Street SW; Atlanta, Georgia
- Coordinates: 33.716848°N 84.4252°W
- Platforms: 1 island platform
- Tracks: 2
- Connections: MARTA Bus: 79, 83, 162, 172, 295

Construction
- Structure type: Embankment
- Parking: 337 spaces; daily parking
- Cycle facilities: 8 spaces
- Accessible: YES

Other information
- Station code: S3

History
- Opened: December 15, 1984

Passengers
- 2013: 4,432 (avg. weekday) ▲3%

Services
Preceding station	MARTA	Following station
Lakewood/Fort McPherson toward Airport	Gold Line	West End toward Doraville
Lakewood/Fort McPherson toward Airport	Red Line	West End toward North Springs
Location

Oakland City is a subway station in Atlanta, Georgia, serving the Red and Gold lines of the Metropolitan Atlanta Rapid Transit Authority (MARTA) rail system. Opened on December 15, 1984, it has one island platform between two tracks. Both sides of the station are accessed via a pedestrian underpass beneath adjacent roadways and, in the case of the east underpass, a freight railway. Though at-grade, the steep embankment on which this station is situated gives it the appearance of an elevated station. This station mainly serves the Oakland City, Sylvan Hills and Capitol View neighborhoods of Atlanta.
