= West End station =

West End station may refer to:

- West End station (DART), a DART train station in Dallas, Texas
- West End station (MARTA), a MARTA train station in Atlanta, Georgia
- Science Park station (MBTA), signed as Science Park/West End, an MBTA train station in Boston, Massachusetts
