= Gold Line (MARTA) =

Rapid transit line in Metro Atlanta, Georgia

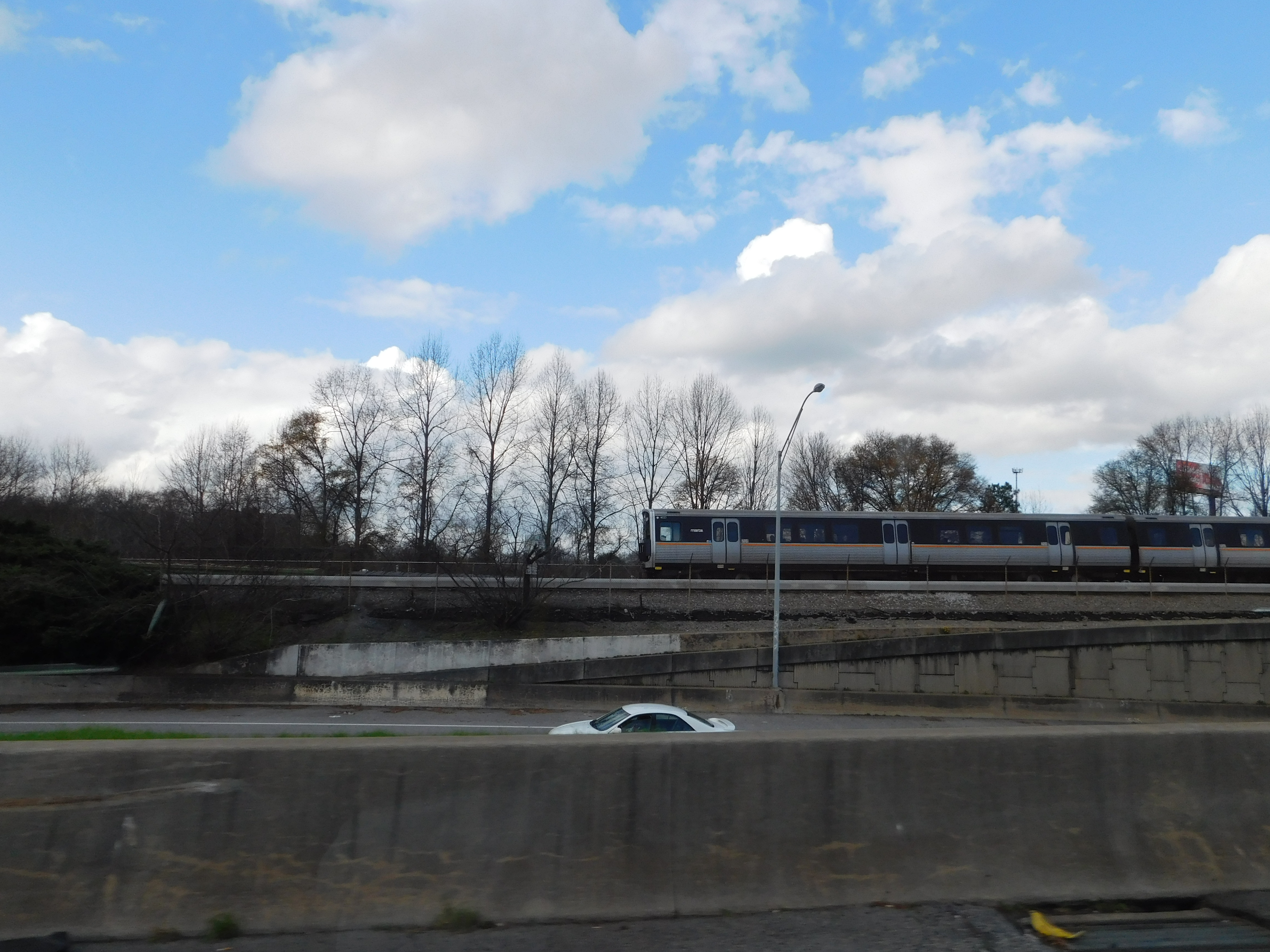
- A Gold Line train on the viaduct north of Arts Center station

Overview
- Status: Operational
- Locale: Atlanta, Georgia
- Termini: Doraville (northeast); Airport (south)
- Stations: 18 (4 Northeast, 6 North, Five Points, 7 South)

Service
- Type: Rapid transit
- System: MARTA rail
- Operator(s): MARTA
- Rolling stock: See MARTA rail#Rolling stock

History
- Opened: 1981

Technical
- Character: at grade, elevated, underground
- Track gauge: 4 ft 8 1/2 in (1,435 mm) standard gauge
- Electrification: Third rail, 750 V DC
Route map
Gold Line highlighted in gold
Key

The Gold Line is a rapid transit line in the MARTA rail system. It operates between Doraville and Airport stations, running through Doraville, Chamblee, Brookhaven, Atlanta, East Point and College Park.

== History ==
What is now the Gold and Red Lines' shared section was originally opened on December 4, 1981, as the North-South Line between Garnett and North Avenue. On September 11, 1982, an infill station at Peachtree Center opened, while the North-South Line was extended south by one stop to West End station. On December 18 the same year, the North-South Line was extended northward to Midtown and Arts Center. On December 15, 1984, the Lakewood/Fort McPherson, Oakland City, Lindbergh Center, Lenox, and Brookhaven (now Brookhaven/Oglethorpe) stations all opened, with the last two being the first stations on what would become the Gold Line branch. East Point station opened on August 16, 1986, followed by Chamblee on December 19, 1987, and the College Park and Airport on June 18, 1988. The newest and northernmost station on the line, Doraville, opened on December 29, 1992.

On June 8, 1996, MARTA added a new branch of the North-South Line, with stations at Buckhead, Medical Center, and Dunwoody. To distinguish the two lines, the line to Dunwoody assumed the North-South Rail Line name, while the line to Doraville became the Northeast-South Rail Line (sometimes known as the Northeast Line for short). However, both the North-South Line and the Northeast Line continued to be colored on maps in orange as a single North-South Rail Line until December 2006, when the North-South Line began to be colored as red, and the Northeast Line as orange.

In October 2009, MARTA introduced a color-coded system of naming rail lines, with the Northeast Line being renamed to the Yellow Line, and the color orange falling out of use. However, in February 2010, the name was revised to Gold in order to address a concern among the Asian-American community in Doraville, which the line serves.

== Future ==
On March 25, 2024, Andre Dickens, the mayor of Atlanta, announced plans for four new infill stations on the MARTA rail network, with one of them, Murphy Crossing, being a station on the Red and Gold Lines' shared section. Murphy Crossing will be on the west side of the Atlanta Beltline. On April 11, Dickens announced that another one of the four proposed stations will also be shared by the Red and Gold Lines: namely, Armour Yards, located near the similarly-named Armour Yard.

== Route ==
The Gold Line runs above ground, at grade and below ground in various portions of its route. It begins at the northeastern terminus, Doraville station in Doraville. The nonrevenue tracks extend northeastward from the station north of I-285. It then goes southwestward paralleling Peachtree Road in DeKalb County. Upon entering Atlanta in Buckhead, it crosses over the Red Line in the median of GA 400 before joining the Red Line, going southwest paralleling I-85. It turns south through Midtown and enters downtown Atlanta, where it meets the Blue and Green Lines at Five Points station. Leaving downtown, the Gold Line continues south, paralleling Lee Street and Main Street into East Point and College Park before reaching its terminus at the Airport station.

=== Stations ===
listed from northeast to south

Station	Code	Opened	Rail Line Transfer
Doraville	NE10	December 29, 1992	
Chamblee	NE9	December 19, 1987	
Brookhaven/Oglethorpe	NE8	December 15, 1984	
Lenox	NE7	December 15, 1984	
Lindbergh Center	N6	December 15, 1984	Red
Arts Center	N5	December 18, 1982	Red
Midtown	N4	December 18, 1982	Red
North Avenue	N3	December 4, 1981	Red
Civic Center	N2	December 4, 1981	Red
Peachtree Center	N1	September 11, 1982	Red Streetcar
Five Points (Note: The east–west (now Blue/Green Line) platform opened in 1979.)		December 4, 1981	Blue Green Red
Garnett	S1	December 4, 1981	Red
West End	S2	September 11, 1982	Red
Oakland City	S3	December 15, 1984	Red
Lakewood/Fort McPherson	S4	December 15, 1984	Red
East Point	S5	August 16, 1986	Red
College Park	S6	June 18, 1988.	Red
Airport	S7	June 18, 1988.	Red
