= Johnsontown (Atlanta) =

Former settlement in Atlanta, Georgia, U.S.

Coordinates: 33°50′42.88″N 84°21′27.39″W

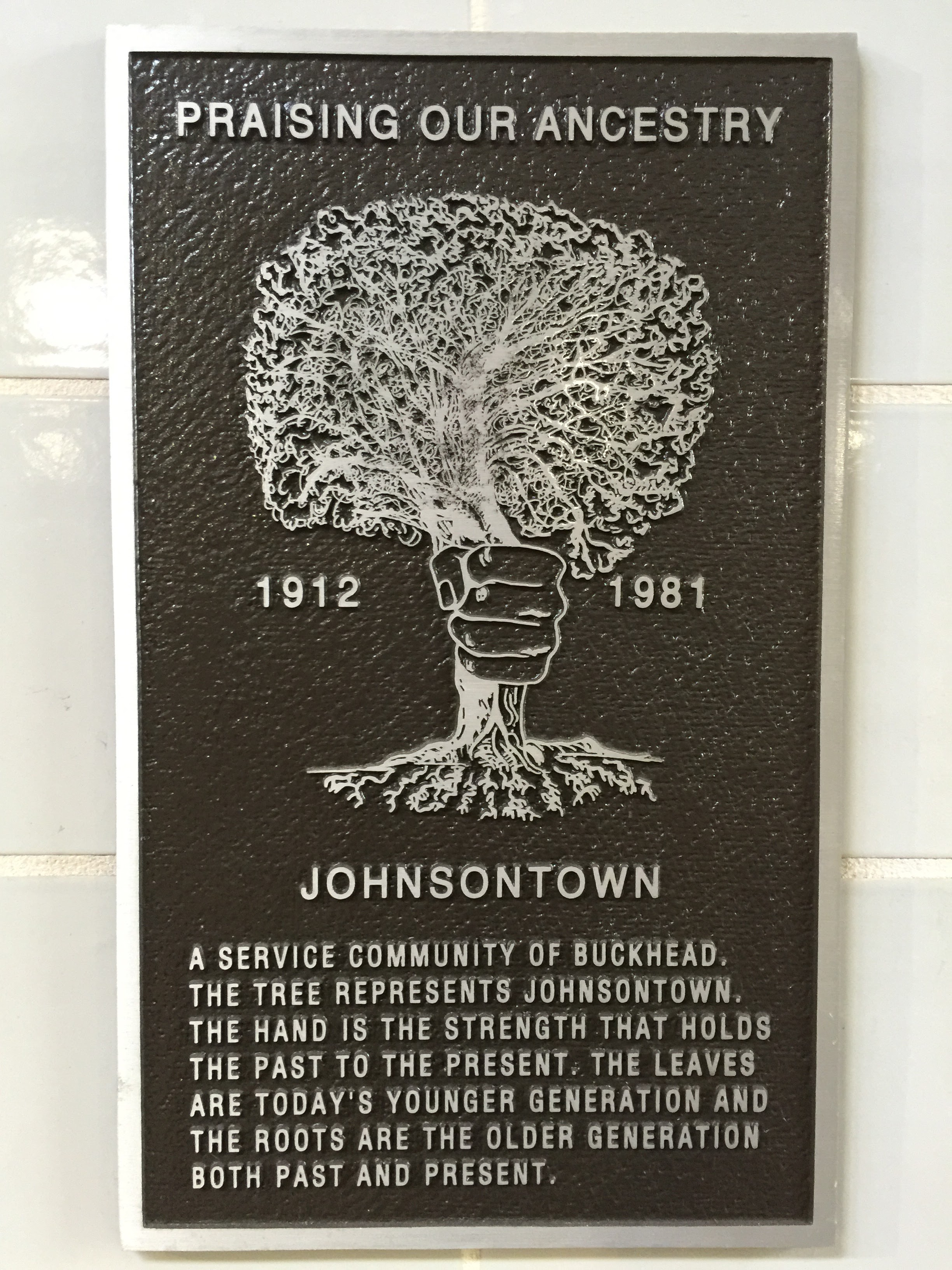
Plaque in the Lenox MARTA station commemorating the Johnsontown community.

Johnsontown was a settlement in what is now the Buckhead Community of Atlanta, Georgia which was located on the present site of the Lenox MARTA station. It was settled by African Americans in 1912. Until 1982 approximately thirty families lived here on 23-foot (7.0 m) by 143-foot (44 m) lots, until the land was acquired to build the rapid transit station.

“In those days, if they wanted your property, they’d condemn it and take it,” said Sam Sawyer, the pastor of Zion Hill Baptist Church in Johnsontown. However, T. M. Alexander Jr., a Morehouse College graduate and banker who had served as the first president of the Atlanta Economic Development Corporation (now Invest Atlanta), volunteered his expertise in helping landowners negotiate settlements many times larger than their original offers. The neighborhood, which saw its first paved street only in its final years, was extensively documented as part of the Historic American Buildings Survey by the Library of Congress before it was razed. Sawyer said “If you go there now, you’d never know there had been a black community named Johnsontown.”
