= List of MARTA bus routes =

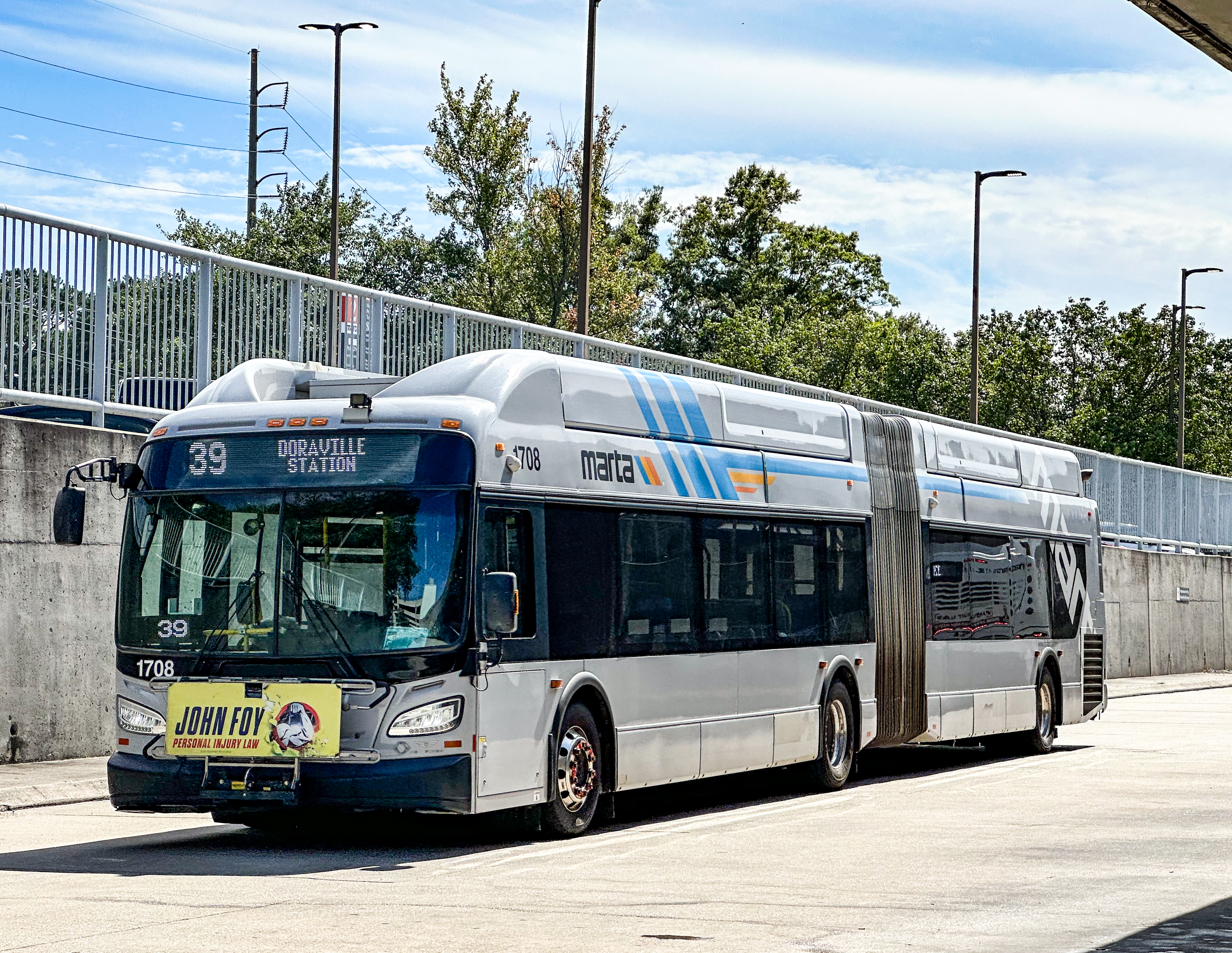
A route 39 bus at Doraville station in 2023

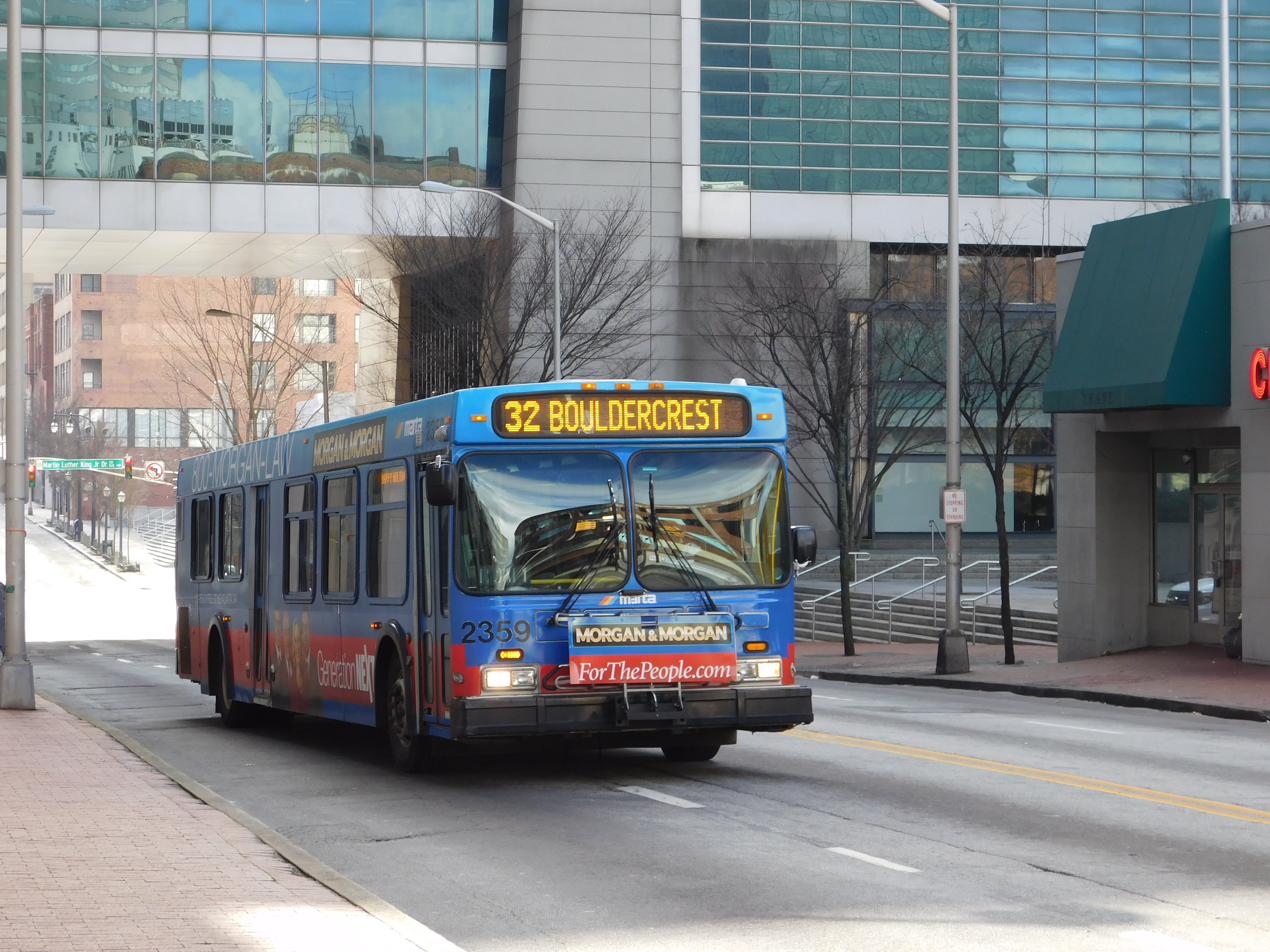
A route 32 bus approaching Five Points station in 2015

The Metropolitan Atlanta Rapid Transit Authority (MARTA) operates a number of bus routes in the Atlanta metro region. The main system operates in Fulton, DeKalb, and Clayton counties, although some routes travel into other suburban counties. In 2025, the system had a ridership of 34,316,700, or about 102,700 per weekday as of the second quarter of 2026.

MARTA developed a "wish list" in 2017 to expand service, including buses. However, there was also a plan in 2017 to reduce some bus services, which outraged residents whose buses would have been eliminated. By 2023, their plans for expanded light rail were modified to include bus rapid transit.

In 2025, MARTA announced a complete revamp of their bus system, called "NextGen Bus Network", reducing the number of bus routes from about 113 to 81. The revamp was launched on April 18, 2026.

== Bus routes ==
MARTA operates 81 local bus routes and one bus rapid transit route called the Rapid A-Line. Along with these routes, MARTA also has 12 demand-responsive transit zones, known as MARTA Reach.

Route	Name	Terminals			Major streets traveled	Service notes
1	Joseph E. Lowery Blvd/ 17th St	Midtown Atlanta; Arts Center	↔	West End; West End	17th St, Northside Dr, Joseph E. Lowery Blvd	Frequency: Every 20 min
2	Donald Lee Hollowell Pkwy/ Ponce de Leon Ave	Bolton; UPS Smart Hub	↔	Edgewood; Edgewood/Chandler Park	Ponce de Leon Ave, North Ave, Donald Lee Hollowell Pkwy	Frequency: Every 10 min; Alternating trips short-turn at Northside Dr
3a	Martin Luther King Jr. Dr	Collier Heights; Harwell Rd & Kingston Rd	↔	Sweet Auburn; King Memorial	Bolton Rd, Fairburn Rd, Collier Rd, Martin Luther King Jr. Dr, Decatur St	Frequency: Every 30 min; Alternating trips run to Boulder Park (3b) or Collier Heights (3a)
3b	Martin Luther King Jr. Dr	Boulder Park; Dollar Mill Rd & Boulder Park Dr	↔	Sweet Auburn; King Memorial	Bakers Ferry Rd/Boulder Park Dr, Martin Luther King Jr. Dr, Decatur St	Frequency: Every 30 min; Alternating trips run to Boulder Park (3b) or Collier Heights (3a)
4	Moreland Ave	Inman Park, Reynoldstown; Inman Park/Reynoldstown	↔	Rebel Valley Forest; Jonesboro Rd & Hargis St	Moreland Ave, Constitution Rd/Forrest Park Rd	Frequency: Every 30 min
5	Piedmont Rd/ Sandy Springs	Dunwoody; Dunwoody	↔	Lindbergh/Morosgo; Lindbergh Center	Hammond Dr, Roswell Rd, Piedmont Rd	Frequency: Every 20 min
7	Boulevard/ McDonough Blvd	Lindbergh/Morosgo; Lindbergh Center	↔	West End; West End	Piedmont Ave, Monroe Dr, Boulevard, McDonough Blvd	Frequency: Every 30 min
10	AUC/Hollywood Rd	Riverside, Whittier Mill Village; James Jackson Pkwy	↔	Sweet Auburn; King Memorial	Decatur St, Atlanta Student Movement Blvd, Ralph David Abernathy Blvd, Hollywood Rd	Frequency: Every 30 min
11	Defoor Ave/ Virginia Highland	Brookhaven; CHOA Arthur M. Blank Hospital	↔	Underwood Hills; Hills Ave	Briarcliff Rd, Clifton Rd, Virginia Ave, 10th St, Northside Dr, Defoors Ave	Frequency: Every 30 min
12	Howell Mill Rd	Cumberland; CobbLinc Cumberland Transfer Center	↔	Midtown Atlanta; Midtown	Cobb Pkwy, Northside Pkwy, Howell Mill Rd, 10th St	Frequency: Every 30 min
14	Blandtown/ Hightower Rd	Adamsville; Hamilton E. Holmes	↔	Midtown Atlanta; Midtown	H. E. Holmes Dr, Hollywood Rd, Bolton Rd, Marietta Blvd, Huff Rd, 10th St	Frequency: Every 30 min
15	Clifton Rd/ Candler Rd	Lindbergh/Morosgo; Lindbergh Center	↔	Decatur; GSU Perimeter College Decatur	Lavista Rd, Clifton Rd, Candler Rd, Panthersville Rd	Frequency: Every 15 min
17	Clairmont Rd/ N Druid Hills Rd	Buckhead; Lenox	↔	Decatur; Avondale	N Druid Hills Rd, Clairmont Rd, E Ponce de Leon Ave/E College Ave/Commerce Dr	Frequency: Every 30 min
20	South DeKalb/ Downtown Atlanta	Downtown Atlanta; Georgia State	↔	Decatur; New Snapfinger Woods Dr	Decatur St/Martin Luther King Jr. Dr, I-20, Rainbow Dr	Frequency: Every 15 min; Alternating off-peak trips short-turn at South DeKalb Transfer Point
21	Memorial Drive ITP	Downtown Atlanta; Georgia State	↔	DeKalb County; Kensington	Decatur St/Piedmont Ave, Memorial Dr	Frequency: Every 30 min
22	Glenwood	Downtown Atlanta; Georgia State	↔	DeKalb County; Indian Creek	Decatur St/Piedmont Ave, Glenwood Ave, S Indian Creek Dr	Frequency: Every 30 min
23	Peachtree Rd/ Buckhead	Midtown Atlanta; Arts Center	↔	Chamblee; Chamblee	Peachtree Rd	Frequency: Every 20 min; Alternating trips short-turn at Brookhaven/Oglethorpe
26a	James Jackson Pkwy/ Perry Blvd	Adamsville; Hamilton E. Holmes	↔	Bankhead; Bankhead	H. E. Holmes Dr, James Jackson Pkwy, Northwest Dr, Perry Blvd, Marietta Blvd	Frequency: Every 30 min; Alternating trips run via James Jackson Pkwy (26b) or Northwest Dr (26a)
26b	James Jackson Pkwy/ Perry Blvd	Adamsville; Hamilton E. Holmes	↔	Bankhead; Bankhead	H. E. Holmes Dr, James Jackson Pkwy, Perry Blvd, Marietta Blvd	Frequency: Every 30 min; Alternating trips run via James Jackson Pkwy (26b) or Northwest Dr (26a)
32	Bouldercrest Rd	Inman Park, Reynoldstown; Inman Park/Reynoldstown	↔	Ellenwood; Linecrest Rd	Moreland Ave, Boulercrest Rd, River Rd	Frequency: Every 40 min
34	2nd Ave/ Clifton Springs Rd	Kirkwood; East Lake	↔	Decatur; South DeKalb Transfer Point	2nd Ave, Gresham Rd, Clifton Springs Rd	Frequency: Every 40 min
39	Buford Hwy	Doraville; Doraville	↔	Lindbergh/Morosgo; Lindbergh Center	Buford Hwy, Sidney Marcus Blvd	Frequency: Every 15 min
42	McDaniel St/ Pryor Rd	Downtown Atlanta; Georgia State	↔	Lakewood; Lakewood/Fort McPherson	Decatur St/Martin Luther King Jr. Dr, McDaniel St, Pryor Rd, Langford Pkwy	Frequency: Every 30 min
46	I-85 Access Rd/ Briarwood	Brookhaven; Brookhaven/Oglethorpe	↺	Briarwood; I-85 Access Rds	Briarwood Rd; Counterclockwise Loop: I-85 Access Rds, Cliff Valley Way, Briarfcliff Rd, Century Blvd	Frequency: Every 40 min
48	I-85 Access Rd/ North Brookhaven	Dunwoody; Dunwoody	↺	Brookhaven; I-85 Access Rds	Ashford Dunwoody Rd, Johnson Ferry Rd, Clairmont Rd; Counterclockwise Loop: I-85 Access Rds, Dresden Dr	Frequency: Every 40 min
49	McDonough Blvd/ Hill St	Midtown Atlanta; North Avenue	↔	DeKalb County; Metro Transitional Center	Courtlandt St/Piedmont Ave, Hill St, McDonough Blvd, Moreland Ave	Frequency: Every 20 min
51	Joseph E. Boone Blvd/ Ralph McGill Blvd	Adamsville; Hamilton E. Holmes	↔	Inman Park, Reynoldstown; Inman Park/Reynoldstown	Joseph E. Boone Blvd, Ralph McGill Blvd, Moreland Ave	Frequency: Every 20 min
52	Marietta Rd	Bolton; Moores Mill Shopping Center	↔	Bankhead; Bankhead	Bolton Rd, Marietta Rd, Marietta Blvd	Frequency: Every 40 min
55	Jonesboro Rd	Downtown Atlanta; Georgia State	↔	Forest Park; Jonesboro Rd & Main St	Pryor St/Central Ave, Jonesboro Rd	Frequency: Every 30 min
66	Brownlee Rd/ Harbin Rd	Adamsville; Hamilton E. Holmes	↔	Mellwood; Camp Creek Apartments	Martin Luther King Jr. Dr, Lynhurst Dr, Harbin Rd, Childress Dr, Greenbriar Pkwy	Frequency: Every 40 min
67	Peyton Pl	Adamsville; Hamilton E. Holmes	↺	Adamsville; Peyton Pl	Counterclockwise Loop: Martin Luther King Jr. Dr, Harland Rd, Peyton Rd, Peyton Pl	Frequency: Every 40 min
68	Donnelly Ave/ Beecher	Cascade Heights; Blvd. Grenada & Essex Ave	↔	West End; West End	Lee St, Donnelly Ave, Beecher Rd	Frequency: Every 60 min
71a	Cascade Rd	Ashley Courts; Ashley Cascade Apartments	↔	West End; West End	Ralph David Abernathy Blvd, Cascade Rd	Frequency: Every 20 min; Alternating trips run to Ashley Courts (71a) every 40 min or South Fulton (71b) every 60 min
71b	Cascade Rd	South Fulton; Boat Rock Transfer Point	↔	West End; West End	Ralph David Abernathy Blvd, Cascade Rd, Fulton Industrial Blvd	Frequency: Every 20 min; Alternating trips run to Ashley Courts (71a) every 40 min or South Fulton (71b) every 60 min
73	Fulton Industrial Blvd	South Fulton; Boat Rock Transfer Point	↔	Adamsville; Hamilton E. Holmes	Martin Luther King Jr. Dr, Fulton Industrial Blvd	Frequency: Every 15 min
74	Flat Shoals Rd	Inman Park, Reynoldstown; Inman Park/Reynoldstown	↔	Ellenwood; S Park Blvd	Flat Shoals Rd, Panthersville Rd, Bouldercrest Rd	Frequency: Every 40 min
75	Lawrenceville Hwy	Decatur; Avondale	↔	Stone Mountain; Goldsmith P&R	Lawrenceville Hwy, Montreal Rd, Northlake Pkwy, Mountain Industrial Blvd	Frequency: Every 30 min
78	Cleveland Ave	East Point; East Point	↔	Browns Mill Park; Jonesboro Rd	Cleveland Ave	Frequency: Every 15 min
79	Sylvan Rd/ Hapeville	Oakland City; Oakland City	↔	Hapeville; Downtown Hapeville	Sylvan Rd, N Central Ave	Frequency: Every 30 min
80	Headland Dr/ Sandtown	East Point; East Point	↔	South Fulton; Boat Rock Transfer Point	Headland Dr, Campbelton Rd, Fulton Industrial Blvd	Frequency: Every 60 min
81	Venetian Hills	West End; West End	↔	East Point; East Point	Oglethorpe Ave, Venitian Dr, Conally Dr	Frequency: Every 40 min
83	Campbellton Rd	Oakland City; Oakland City	↔	Ben Hill Acres; Barge Road P&R	Campbellton Rd, Greenbriar Pkwy	Frequency: Every 15 min
84	Washington Rd/ Camp Creek Marketplace	East Point; East Point	↔	East Point; Camp Creek Marketplace	Washington Rd, N Commerce Dr	Frequency: Every 15 min
85	Roswell	Sandy Springs; North Springs	↔	Alpharetta; Mansell Road P&R	GA-400, Roswell Rd, Atlanta St, Alpharetta St, Mansell Rd	Frequency: Every 40 min
87	Roswell Rd/ Dunwoody	Dunwoody; Dunwoody	↔	Sandy Springs; North Springs	Glenridge Dr, Roswell Rd, GA-400	Frequency: Every 30 min
88	Dunwoody Village/ Georgetown	Dunwoody; Dunwoody	↔	Doraville; Doraville	Ashford Dunwoody Rd, Chamblee Dunwoody Rd, N Shallowford Rd	Frequency: Every 60 min
89a	Old National Hwy	Union City; South Fulton Transfer Point	↔	College Park; College Park	Main St, Old National Hwy, Flat Shoals Rd, Shannon Pkwy	Frequency: Every 15 min; Trips alternate between Union City (89a/b) & Riverdale (89c); Trips to Union City run via Shannon Pkwy (89a) or Oakley Rd (89b)
89b	Old National Hwy	Union City; South Fulton Transfer Point	↔	College Park; College Park	Main St, Old National Hwy, Flat Shoals Rd, Oakley Rd	Frequency: Every 15 min; Trips alternate between Union City (89a/b) & Riverdale (89c); Trips to Union City run via Shannon Pkwy (89a) or Oakley Rd (89b)
89c	Old National Hwy	Riverdale; Riverdale P&R	↔	College Park; College Park	Main St, Old National Hwy, GA-138, GA-85	Frequency: Every 15 min; Trips alternate between Union City (89a/b) & Riverdale (89c); Trips to Union City run via Shannon Pkwy (89a) or Oakley Rd (89b)
95	Metropolitan Pkwy	West End; West End	↔	East Point; Sylvan Rd	Metropolitan Pkwy, Cleveland Ave	Frequency: Every 15 min
96	Dogwood Dr/ Virginia Ave	Lakewood; Lakewood/Fort McPherson	↔	College Park; College Park	Langford Pkwy, Metropolitan Pkwy, Dogwood Dr, Virginia Ave	Frequency: Every 20 min
104	Winters Chapel Rd	Sandy Springs; Dunwoody Club Dr	↔	Doraville; Doraville	New Peachtree Rd, Winters Chapel Rd, Peachtree Industrial Blvd Access Rd, Tilly Mill Rd	Frequency: Every 40 min
109	Peachcrest Rd/ Columbia Dr	DeKalb County; Kensington	↔	Decatur; South DeKalb Transfer Point	Peachcrest Rd, Columbia Dr, Clifton Springs Rd	Frequency: Every 30 min
111	S Hairston Rd/ Wesley Chapel Rd	DeKalb County; Indian Creek	↔	Decatur; South DeKalb Transfer Point	Redan Rd, S Hairston Rd, Wesley Chapel Rd, Flat Shoals Pkwy	Frequency: Every 40 min
114	Columbia Dr/ Snapfinger Woods Dr	Decatur; Decatur	↔	Stonecrest; The Mall at Stonecrest	S Columbia Dr, Snapfinger Woods Dr	Frequency: Every 30 min
115	Covington Hwy	Decatur; Avondale	↔	Stonecrest; The Mall at Stonecrest	Covington Hwy	Frequency: Every 20 min
116	Redan Rd	DeKalb County; Kensington	↔	Stonecrest; The Mall at Stonecrest	Redan Rd, S Stone Mountain-Lithonia Rd	Frequency: Every 30 min
117	Stone Mountain/ Panola Rd	Stonecrest; Fairington Pkwy	↔	Stone Mountain; Goldsmith P&R	Fairington Pkwy, Panola Rd, S Stone Mountain-Lithonia Rd	Frequency: Every 30 min; Continues westbound as Route 121
118	Rockbridge Rd	Decatur; Avondale	↔	Stone Mountain; N Hairston Rd	Church St, N Decatur Rd, Rockbridge Rd, N Stone Mountain-Lithonia Rd, E Ponce de Leon Ave	Frequency: Every 30 min; Continues westbound as Route 120
119	Hairston Rd	DeKalb County; Kensington	↔	Stone Mountain; Goldsmith P&R	Kensington Rd, Redan Rd, Hairston Rd	Frequency: Every 30 min
120	E Ponce de Leon Ave	Decatur; Avondale	↔	Stone Mountain; N Hairston Rd	E Ponce de Leon Ave	Frequency: Every 30 min; Continues eastbound as Route 118
121	Memorial Dr OTP/ Pleasantdale	Doraville; Doraville	↔	DeKalb County; Kensington	Pleasantdale Rd, N Hairston Rd, Memorial Dr	Frequency: Every 15 min; Trips alternate between Doraville & Stone Mountain; Stone Mountain trips continue southbound as Route 117
121	Memorial Dr OTP/ Pleasantdale	Stone Mountain; Goldsmith P&R	↔	DeKalb County; Kensington	N Hairston Rd, Memorial Dr	Frequency: Every 15 min; Trips alternate between Doraville & Stone Mountain; Stone Mountain trips continue southbound as Route 117
125	Clarkston/ Embry Hills	Chamblee; Chamblee	↔	DeKalb County; Kensington	Chamblee Tucker Rd, Henderson Mill Rd, Lawrenceville Hwy, N Indian Creek Dr, Memorial Dr	Frequency: Every 30 min
127	Winn Way	Decatur; Avondale	↔	Decatur; Emory Decatur Hospital	Winn Way	Frequency: Every 40 min
128	Valley Brook Rd	Decatur; Avondale	↔	Decatur; Lulah Hills	N Arcadia Ave, DeKalb Industrial Way/N Decatur Rd, Lawrenceville Hwy/Valley Brook Rd	Frequency: Every 40 min
132	Tilly Mill Rd	Chamblee; Chamblee	↔	Sandy Springs; Dunwoody Club Dr	Peachtree Blvd, N Peachtree Rd, Tilly Mill Rd	Frequency: Every 60 min
140a	North Point Pkwy	Sandy Springs; North Springs	↔	Alpharetta; Deerfield Place Shopping Center	GA-400, North Point Pkwy, Haynes Bridge Rd, Webb Bridge Rd, Windward Pkwy	Frequency: Every 20 min; Alternating trips run to Deerfield Place (140a) or GSU Alpharetta Center (140b)
140b	North Point Pkwy	Sandy Springs; North Springs	↔	Alpharetta; GSU Alpharetta Center	GA-400, North Point Pkwy, Haynes Bridge Rd, Webb Bridge Rd, Old Milton Pkwy	Frequency: Every 20 min; Alternating trips run to Deerfield Place (140a) or GSU Alpharetta Center (140b)
162	Stanton Rd/ Alison Ct	Campbellton Rd; Baptist Towers	↔	Oakland City; Oakland City	Alison Ct, Stanton Rd, Campbellton Rd	Frequency: Every 20 min
165	Fairburn Rd/ Camp Creek Pkwy	College Park; College Park	↔	Adamsville; Hamilton E. Holmes	Camp Creek Pkwy, Fairburn Rd, Martin Luther King Jr. Dr	Frequency: Every 30 min
178	Mount Zion Rd	Lakewood; Lakewood/Fort McPherson	↺	Blair Villa/Pool Creek; MARTA Hamilton Bus Facility	Langford Pkwy, I-85, Cleveland Ave, Mt. Zion Rd, Browns Mill Rd; Counterclockwise Loop: Hamilton Blvd, Zip Industrial Blvd, Southside Industrial Pkwy, Ruby Harper Blvd	Frequency: Every 30 min
180	Roosevelt Hwy	College Park; College Park	↔	Palmetto; Downtown Palmetto	Main St, Roosevelt Hwy, Jonesboro Rd, W Broad St	Frequency: Every 30 min; Alternating trips short-turn at South Fulton Transfer Point
182	S Fulton Pkwy	College Park; College Park	↔	Union City; South Fulton Transfer Point	I-85, S Fulton Pkwy, Beverly Engram Pkwy	Frequency: Every 60 min
184	Buffington Rd	College Park; College Park	↔	Union City; South Fulton Transfer Point	I-85, S Fulton Pkwy, Buffington Rd	Frequency: Every 30 min
185	Alpharetta	Sandy Springs; North Springs	↔	Alpharetta; Windward P&R	GA-400, Holcomb Bridge Rd, Alpharetta Hwy, S Main St, Windward Pkwy	Frequency: Every 40 min
187	Godby Rd/ Sullivan Rd	College Park; College Park	↻	College Park	E Main St, Best Rd; Counterclockwise Loop: Riverdale Rd, Southampton Rd, Godby Rd, Old National Hwy, Sullivan Rd	Frequency: Every 20 min
189	Scofield Rd/ Creel Rd	College Park; College Park	↔	Union City; South Fulton Transfer Point	Main St, Scolfield Rd, Old National Hwy, Creel Rd, Jonesboro Rd	Frequency: Every 60 min
191	Riverdale/ ATL Int'l Terminal	Lakewood; Lakewood/Fort McPherson	↔	Jonesboro; Harold R. Banke Justice Center	Langford Pkwy, GA-85, Flint River Rd	Frequency: Every 45 min
192	Old Dixie/ Tara Blvd	East Point; East Point	↔	Jonesboro; Harold R. Banke Justice Center	Perry J. Hudson Pkwy, Old Dixie Rd, Tara Blvd	Frequency: Every 45-60 min
193	Morrow/ Jonesboro	East Point; East Point	↔	Jonesboro; Harold R. Banke Justice Center	Old Dixie Hwy, Forest Pkwy, Jonesboro Rd/Tara Blvd	Frequency: Every 30 min; Alternating trips run via Jonesboro Rd or Southlake Pkwy; Select trips serve Clayton Transitional Center
194	Conley Rd/ Mount Zion	Lakewood; Lakwood/Fort McPherson	↔	Morrow; Southlake Mall	Langford Pkwy, I-75, Conley Rd, GA-42, Mt. Zion Blvd	Frequency: Every 40 min
195	Forest Pkwy	College Park; College Park	↻	Ellenwood; Anvil Block Rd	Forest Pkwy, Anvil Block Rd; Clockwise Loop: Metcalf Rd, Anvil Block Rd, Bouldercrest Rd, Forest Pkwy	Frequency: Every 60 min
196	Upper Riverdale	College Park; College Park	↔	Morrow; Southlake Mall	I-85, Riverdale Rd, GA-85, Upper Riverdale Rd, Mt. Zion Rd	Frequency: Every 30 min; Additional rush hour trips every 15 min in the peak direction between College Park & Valley Hill Rd
197	Battle Creek Rd	Riverdale; Riverdale Town Center	↔	Stockbridge; Davidson Pkwy	Valley Hill Rd, Battle Creek Rd, Mt. Zion Rd, Mount Zion Pkwy	Frequency: Every 60 min
198	Southlake Pkwy	Riverdale; Riverdale Town Center	↔	Morrow; Southlake Mall	GA-85, GA-138, Southlake Pkwy	Frequency: Every 60 min
800	Lovejoy	Jonesboro; Harold R. Banke Justice Center	↔	Lovejoy; Downtown Lovejoy	Tara Blvd	Frequency: Every 60 min
Rapid A-Line		Downtown Atlanta; Five Points	↔	Carver; Carver	Martin Luther King Jr. Dr/Mitchell St, Hank Aaron Dr	Bus rapid transit service; Frequency: Every 10-12 min; Operating in a limited capacity until construction is complete; Makes stops at select locations only
