= Oakland City, Atlanta =

- Oakland City Historic District
- U.S. National Register of Historic Places
- U.S. Historic district
- Location within Atlanta Location within Georgia Location within the United States
- Location: Atlanta, GA
- Coordinates: 33°43′31.45″N 84°25′35.24″W
- Area: 649 acres (263 ha)
- Architect: Multiple
- Architectural style: American Four Square, Craftsman, English Vernacular Revival, Folk Victorian, Queen Anne, and Minimal Traditional Cottages
- NRHP reference No.: 03000198
- Added to NRHP: April 11, 2003

Oakland City is a historic neighborhood in southwestern Atlanta, Georgia, United States, just southwest across the BeltLine from West End and Adair Park.

Oakland City was incorporated as a city in 1894 and annexed to Atlanta in 1910.

Oakland City Historic District is listed on the National Register of Historic Places. It contains wood and brick bungalows as well as Minimal Traditional, English Vernacular Revival, and Craftsman houses. The district once included the Withers House, which was demolished in the first decade of the 2000s.

The neighborhood is served by the Oakland City MARTA station.

The Oakland City Community Organization is the neighborhood association that meets monthly. The goal of the organization is to promote and improve the quality of life and developments in the neighborhood.

Between the late 1980's to 2010, Oakland City experienced notable decline. However, since 2010, the neighborhood has undergone major revitalization. Crime, blight, property values, demand, and diversity have notably improved.

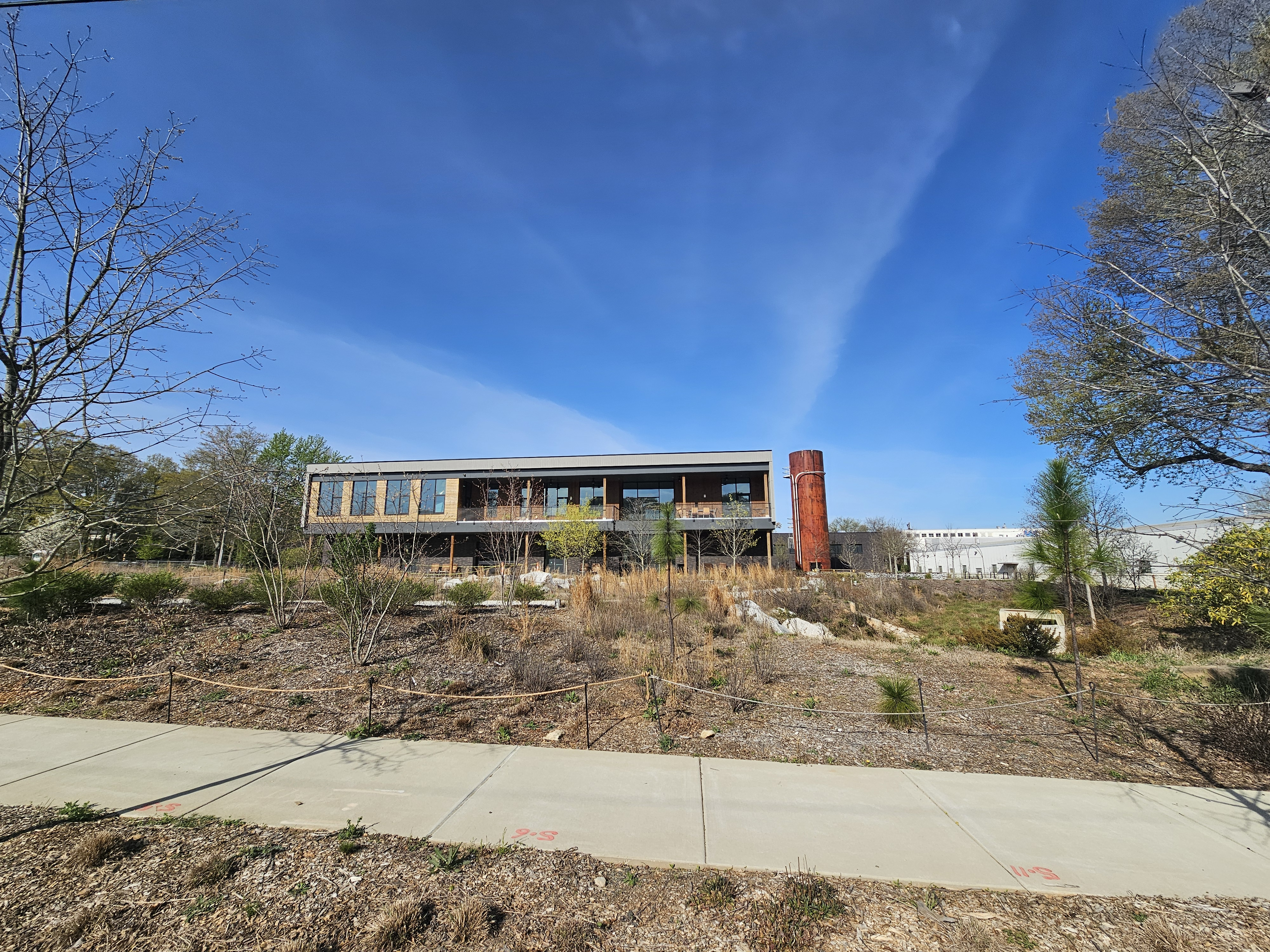
Trees Atlanta headquarters along the BeltLine

In 2023, Trees Atlanta opened its new headquarters on the east side of Oakland City near Adair Park. Founded in 1985, Trees Atlanta is a nonprofit community group that protects and improves Atlanta's urban forest by planting, conserving, and educating. The multi-million dollar modern 23,000-square-foot headquarters building is along the Beltline Westside Trail.

In March 2024, it was announced Murphy Crossing, a 20-acre development along the Beltline's Westside Trail, officially acquired a development team to revitalize the vacant space. The space formally operated as the Georgia Farmers Market and includes about a dozen warehouses and other buildings. Once the revitalization project is complete, Murphy Crossing will have retail stores, restaurants, modern residential units, bike lanes, plazas, public art exhibits, courtyards, a dog park, and a community garden. In January 2025, Beltline leaders announced the termination of the previously announced pending sale of Murphy Crossing to a potential developer who had been working on the project since 2022. The potential developer filed a multi-million dollar lawsuit, claiming that the sale was wrongfully terminated due to miscommunication from Beltline leaders. Despite the lawsuit, Beltline leaders stated they would accelerate planning and development of the site with plans of selling to a new developer and starting construction before the end of 2026.

In April 2024, Mayor Dickens announced that Murphy Crossing will be the site of one of four new MARTA rail stations in Atlanta. The station is expected to be completed by 2030. The last MARTA rail station opened in 2000.

The abandoned warehouse complex at 1088 and 1100 Murphy Ave is set to be transformed into a mix of residential lofts, office space, and retail storefronts. The $53 million first phase of the project is expected to be completed in 2026.

Oakland City's first brand new mixed-use development is scheduled to be completed in early 2027. Fulton County approved a $76.8 million complex with 300 apartment units and 20,000 square feet of retail space. The project is funded by private investors and is situated along the BeltLine at 840 Woodrow Street.
