= Airport station (MARTA) =

MARTA rail station

S7 Airport
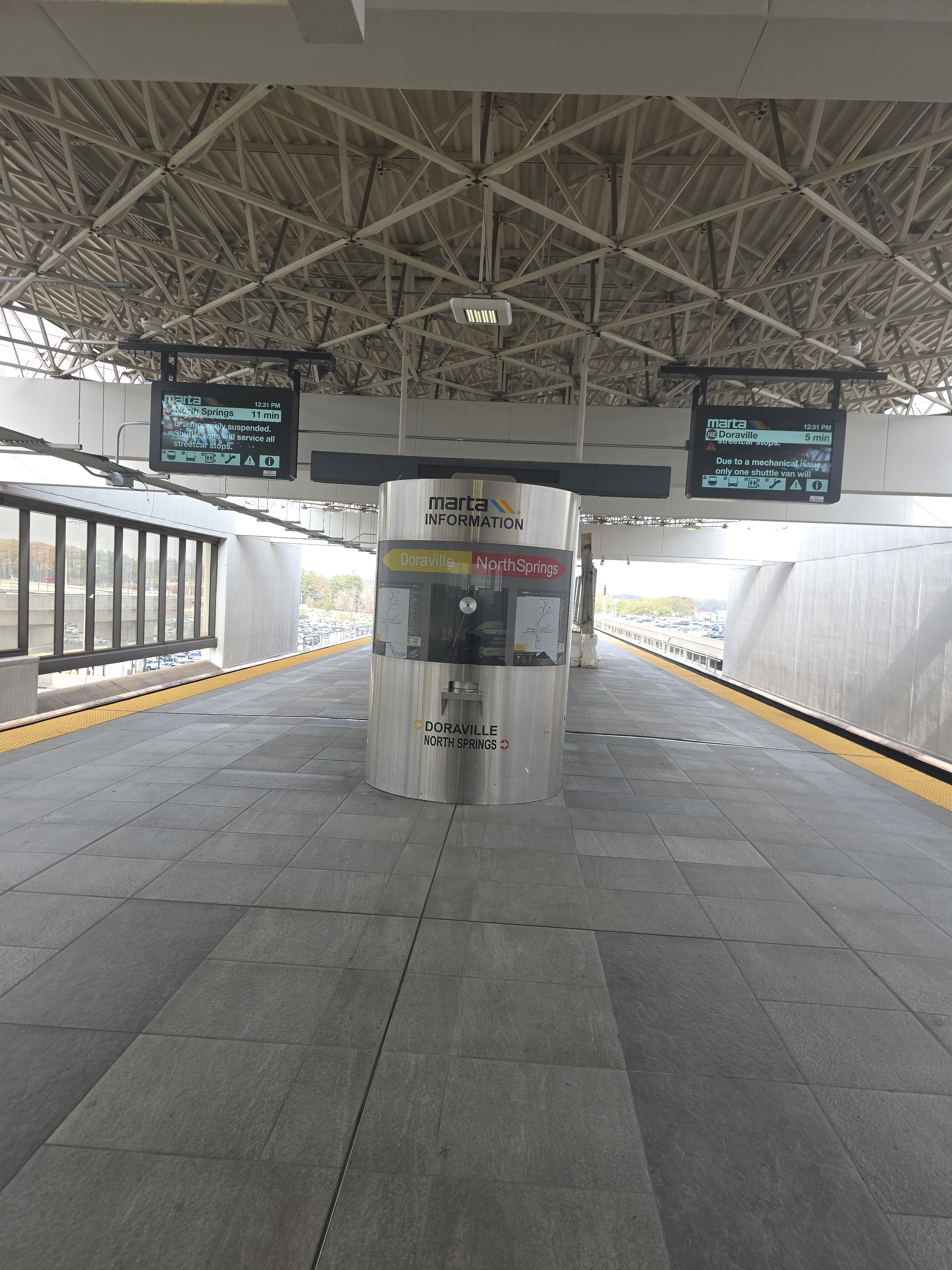
- Island platform at the Airport station. Trains to Doraville (Gold Line) use the left side and trains to North Springs (Red Line) trains use the right.

General information
- Location: Hartsfield–Jackson Atlanta International Airport; South Airport Terminal; Atlanta, GA 30320
- Coordinates: 33.640758°N 84.446341°W
- Owner: MARTA
- Platforms: 1 island platform
- Tracks: 2
- Connections: ATL SkyTrain

Construction
- Structure type: Elevated
- Parking: Paid parking nearby

Other information
- Station code: S7

History
- Opened: June 18, 1988; 38 years ago

Passengers
- 2013: 9,173 (avg. weekday) 0%

Services
Preceding station	MARTA	Following station
Terminus	Red Line	College Park toward North Springs
Terminus	Gold Line	College Park toward Doraville
Location

Airport is an elevated rapid transit station and southern terminus on the Red and Gold lines of the Metropolitan Atlanta Rapid Transit Authority (MARTA) rail system, located at Hartsfield–Jackson Atlanta International Airport. It is served by the Gold Line (4:30am/1:30am), while the Red Line generally serves it all day until 8:30 PM on weekdays and 8:50 PM on weekends when there is no scheduled track maintenance. It features one of only two Ridestores, the only other one being at Five Points.

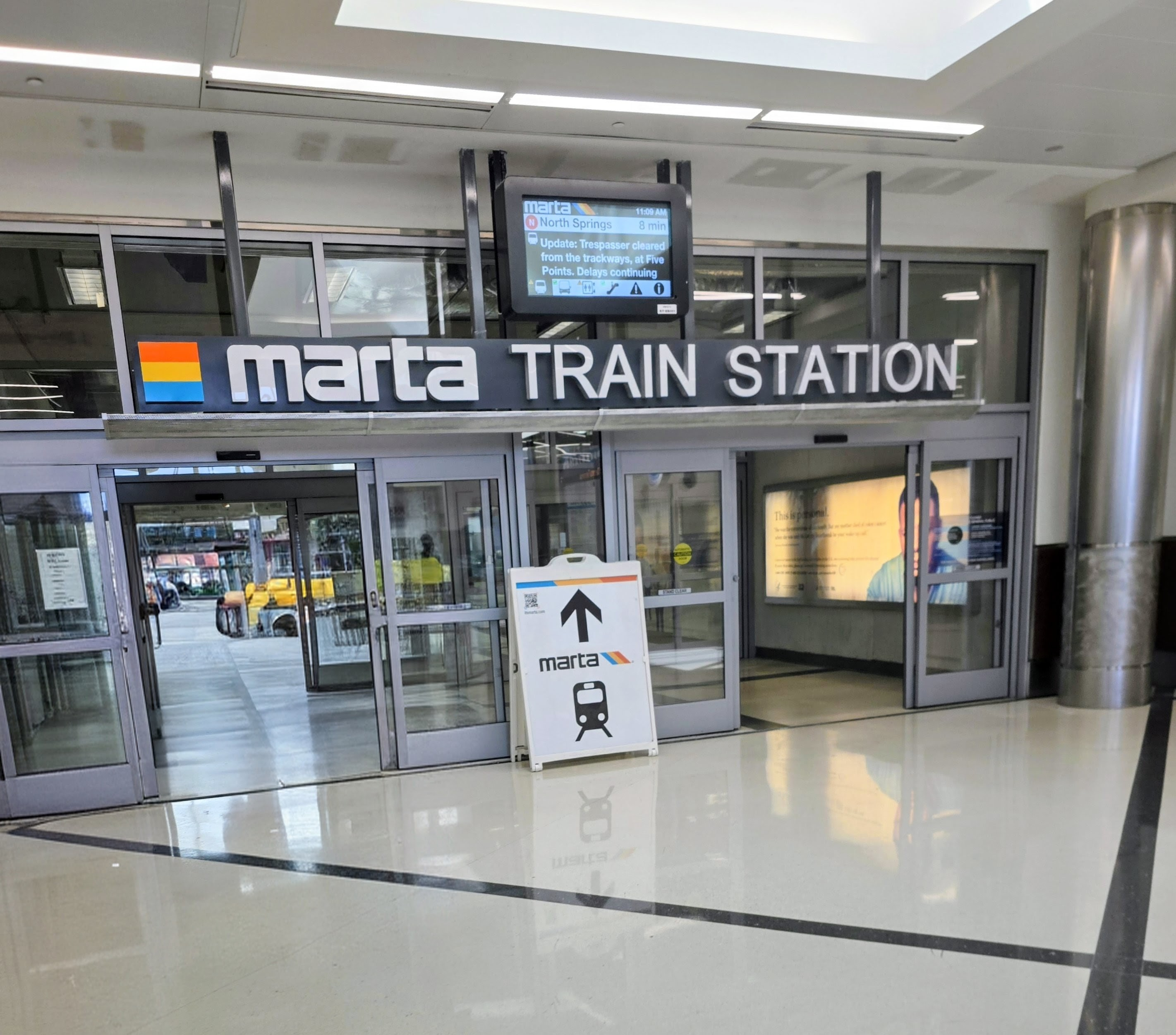
Left entrance into the MARTA train station entrance

The upper level consists of an island platform between two tracks, while the mezzanine contains the fare gates inside the airport terminal. Since all trains are northbound from here, the island platform is set up such that the "southbound" side is for Doraville (Gold Line) trains and the "northbound" side is for North Springs (Red Line) trains. This is the second busiest railway station on the MARTA system, surpassed only by Five Points.

This station provides access to the airport's North and South Terminals. Free transfer service is provided outside and across the street by the ATL Skytrain to the Georgia International Convention Center and the new Consolidated Rental Car Facility.

The Airport station is located within the city limits of College Park and is the only station in Clayton County, while all others are in either Fulton or DeKalb counties.

== History ==
The Airport station was constructed in the late 1970s as part of the current Hartsfield-Jackson midfield terminal complex, which opened on September 21, 1980. However, it only became connected to the rest of the system with the extension of the South Line to the airport in 1988, which also included the College Park station.

== Station layout ==
P Platform level	Northbound	Gold Line toward Doraville (College Park) →
P Platform level	Island platform, doors will open on the left / right
P Platform level	Northbound	Red Line toward North Springs (College Park) →
G	Street level	Entrance/Exit, fare barriers, ATL SkyTrain

== Nearby landmarks and popular destinations ==
- Hartsfield–Jackson Atlanta International Airport
- R. L. Brown, Jr. Grady Medical Center (located inside the airport)
- Georgia International Convention Center and Gateway Center (accessed by ATL SkyTrain)

== Other transit connections ==
- ATL SkyTrain automated people mover to the Georgia International Convention Center and Consolidated Rental Car Facility
- The Plane Train - automated people mover within the airport and underground for travel between terminals
