= Doraville station =

MARTA rail station

NE10 Doraville
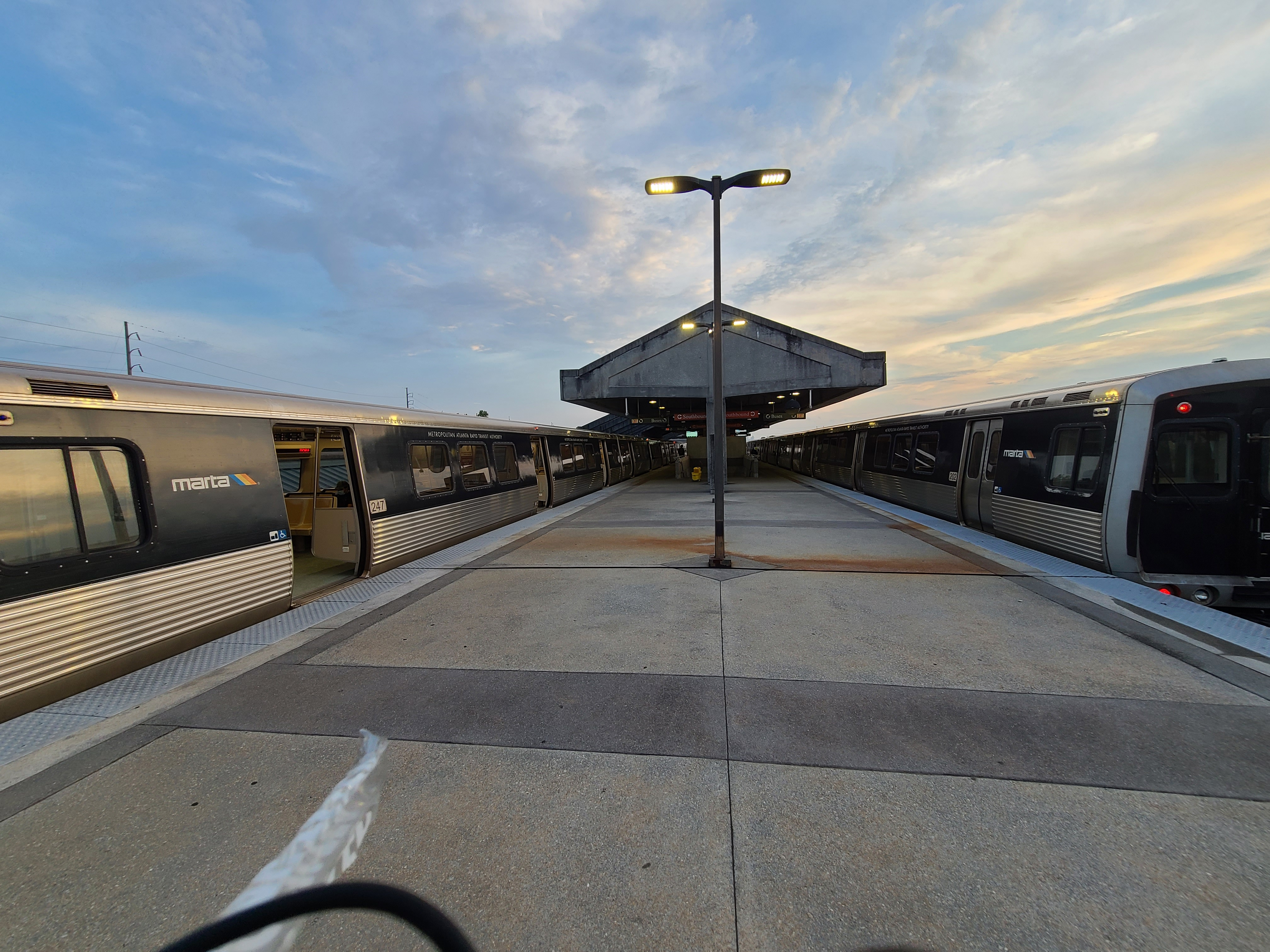

General information
- Location: 6000 New Peachtree Road; Doraville, GA 30340
- Coordinates: 33.902079°N 84.280389°W
- Platforms: 1 island platform
- Tracks: 2
- Connections: MARTA Bus: 25, 39, 104, 124, 133; Ride Gwinnett: 10A, 10B, 20, 35

Construction
- Structure type: Elevated
- Parking: 1,070 spaces
- Cycle facilities: Yes
- Accessible: Yes

Other information
- Station code: NE10

History
- Opened: December 29, 1992; 33 years ago

Services
Preceding station	MARTA	Following station
Chamblee toward Airport	Gold Line	Terminus
Proposed Services
Preceding station	Amtrak	Following station
Anniston toward New Orleans	Crescent proposed	Gainesville toward New York
Location

Doraville is a subway station in Doraville, Georgia, and the northern terminus on the Gold Line of the Metropolitan Atlanta Rapid Transit Authority (MARTA) rail system. Doraville serves as the ground for the Doraville rail yard for the Gold line, with a capacity of 30 rail cars.

This station mainly serves Doraville, Tucker, Norcross, Peachtree Corners, Duluth and Lawrenceville.

This station provides access to Doraville City Hall, Doraville Health Department, Doraville Public Library, and bus service to Sugarloaf Mills (formerly Discover Mills). Bus service is also provided at this station to Oglethorpe University, Buford Highway, Peachtree Industrial Boulevard, and Jimmy Carter Boulevard.

== History ==
In 1985, GDOT rejected MARTA's proposed station location above I-285, delaying the projected opening date to 1989.

== Station layout ==
P Platform level	Westbound	← Gold Line toward Airport (Chamblee)
P Platform level	Island platform, doors will open on the left, right
P Platform level	Westbound	← Gold Line toward Airport (Chamblee)
G	Street Level	Entrance/Exit, station house

=== Parking ===
Doraville has 1,070 daily and long-term parking spaces available for MARTA users which are located in paved parking lots and one parking deck.

== Bus service ==
Doraville station is served by the following MARTA bus routes:

- Route 25 - Peachtree Industrial Boulevard
- Route 39 - Buford Highway
- Route 104 - Winters Chapel Road
- Route 124 - Pleasantdale Road
- Route 133 - Shallowford Road

The station is also served by the following Ride Gwinnett bus routes:

- Route 10A/10B - Sugarloaf Mills to Gwinnett Place to Doraville Station via Satellite Boulevard, Buford Highway, and Beaver Ruin Road corridors
- Route 20 - Norcross to Indian Trail-Lilburn Road/Singleton Road/Graves Road corridors to Doraville Station
- Route 35 - Peachtree Corners to Norcross to Doraville Station

== Proposed Intercity Rail Service ==
Amtrak has been considering moving their service for the Atlanta area to a site near this station to replace their current station in the Brookwood neighborhood. While agreements with MARTA and Norfolk Southern are necessary, this would provide the station with a direct connection with Amtrak Crescent service to New York City, Charlotte, Washington, DC, Birmingham, and New Orleans.

The station site is also proposed for possible intercity service on the Southeast High Speed Rail Corridor's Charlotte to Atlanta segment, should a future analysis choose an approach into Atlanta via Norfolk Southern Railway trackage. If the alignment through Doraville is chosen, it is assumed at all trains along the corridor would stop here, due to its connection to the MARTA rail system.

Amtrak had again listed Doraville as a proposed station stop along a corridor route from Charlotte, North Carolina to Atlanta as part of their "Connects US" plan in May 2021. As part of this vision, three round trips would operate to Charlotte daily, with two of these trips extending to Union Station in Raleigh, North Carolina as a possible extension of the existing Piedmont service.
