= Ansley Mall =

Shopping center in Atlanta, Georgia

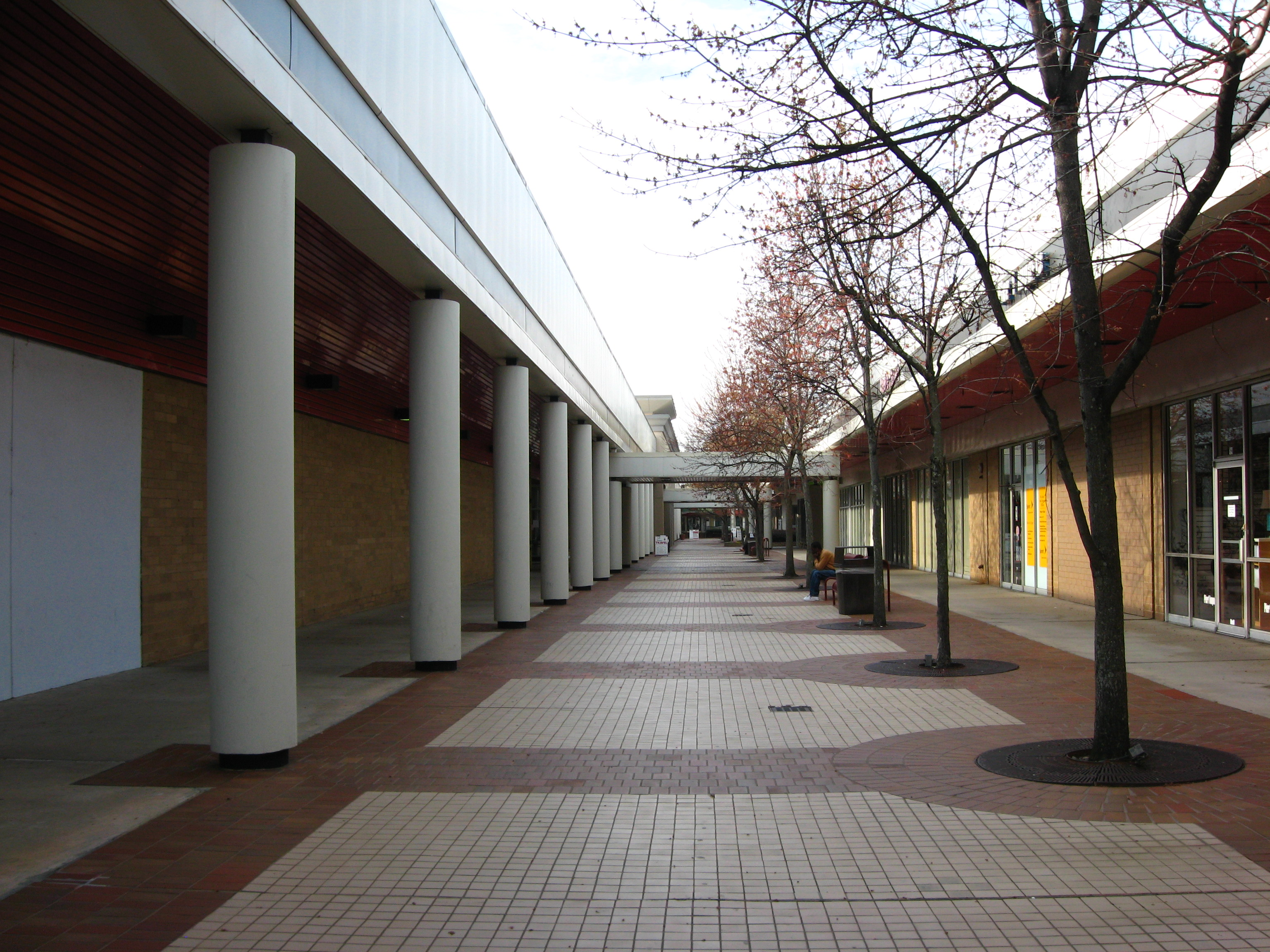

- Location within Atlanta

General information
- Coordinates: 33.7982°N 84.3712°W
- Opened: 1964
- Renovated: 2010

Ansley Mall is an open-air shopping mall in the Piedmont Heights neighborhood of Atlanta at 1544 Piedmont Avenue at the intersection of Monroe Drive near the Atlanta BeltLine trail.

Ansley opened in 1964 in Midtown Atlanta's Tenth Street shopping district. The single-level center had 175,300 square feet (16,290 m^{2}) of leasable area and was anchored by a 27,300-square-foot (2,540 m^{2}) Woolworth's variety store and 35,000-square-foot (3,300 m^{2}) Colonial supermarket. The tenant list of the 3.2-million-dollar complex included twenty-six retailers.

It was a "twin" of what is now officially called the Crossroads Shopping Center, better known by its name in its heyday, Stewart-Lakewood Center, an open-air shopping center on Metropolitan Parkway (formerly Stewart Avenue) at Langford Parkway (formerly Lakewood Freeway) in the Sylvan Hills neighborhood of southern Atlanta. Stewart-Lakewood was built in 1962 by the same company and in the same style as Ansley and was also considered a major regional retail center.

In 1969, a movie theater in the mall was the site of the Lonesome Cowboys police raid, a seminal moment in the history of the LGBT community in Atlanta.

The mall was renovated in 2010, the works carried out by Earthstation.

Anchors include Publix supermarket, an LA Fitness gym, and a CVS Pharmacy. It is owned by Selig.

The Ansley Mall area rivals Cheshire Bridge Road and the intersection of 10th and Piedmont as the most popular gathering area for gay men in Atlanta. Across Clear Creek is Ansley Square, a strip mall with more gay bars and gay-friendly spaces.
