= Capitol View, Atlanta =

Neighborhood in Atlanta, Georgia, US

Coordinates: 33.71661°N 84.415947°W

Capitol View is a historic intown southwest Atlanta, Georgia neighborhood. The neighborhood is 2.5 miles from downtown and was named for its views of the Georgia State Capitol building. Its boundaries include Metropolitan Parkway to the east, Lee Street to the west, and the Beltline to the north. On the south, the border follows Arden Street, Deckner Avenue, and Perkerson Park.

Capitol View is filled with a housing stock of 1915–1925 craftsman bungalows as well as earlier Queen Anne houses that precede the planned development of the neighborhood. Several of the Queen Annes on Metropolitan Avenue were built by the Deckner family, for whom Decker Avenue is named. Many of the historic homes are rapidly being renovated as the neighborhood continues to revitalize and attract new residents.

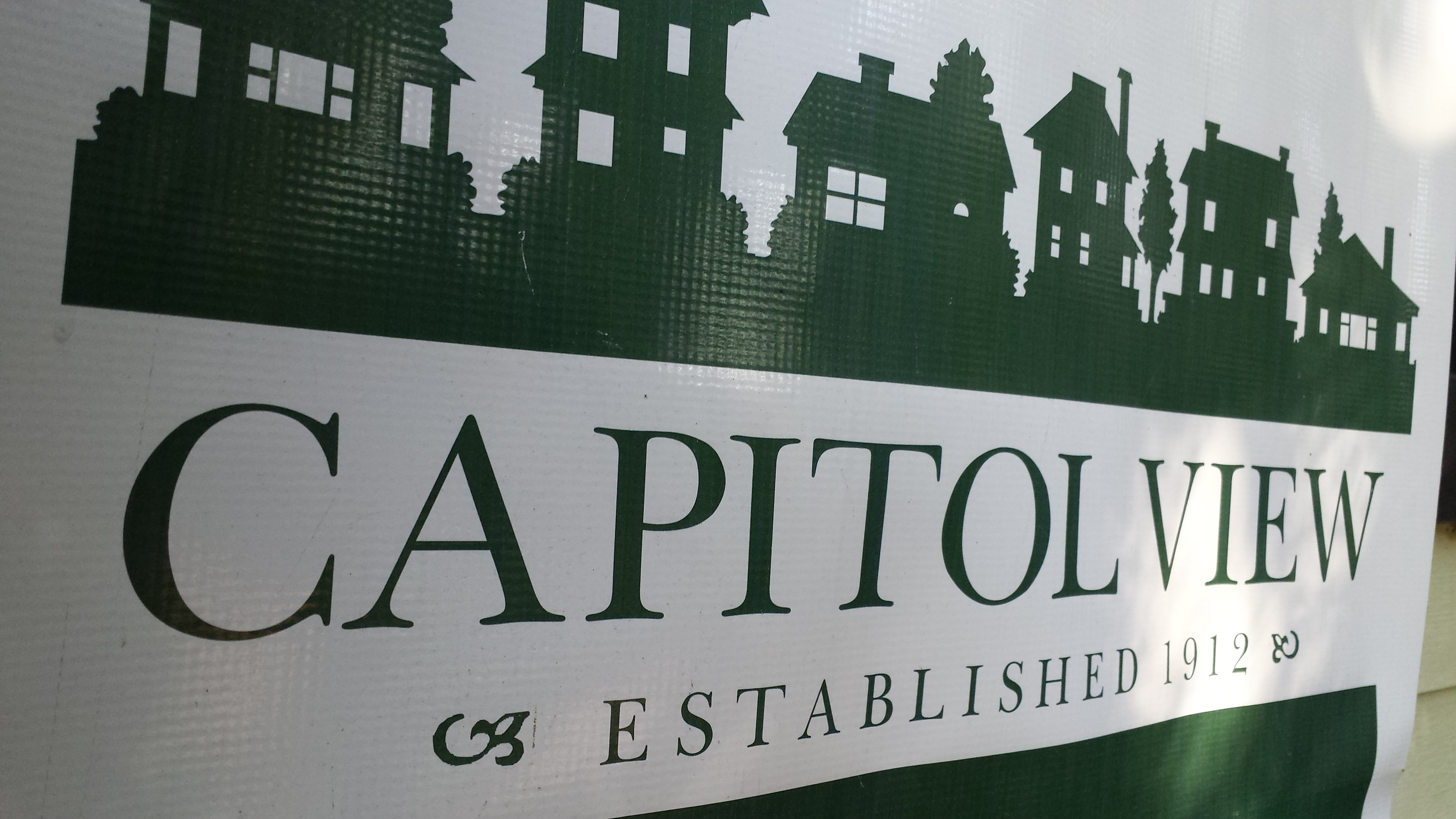
Capitol View Neighborhood Association banner

== History ==
=== Early history ===
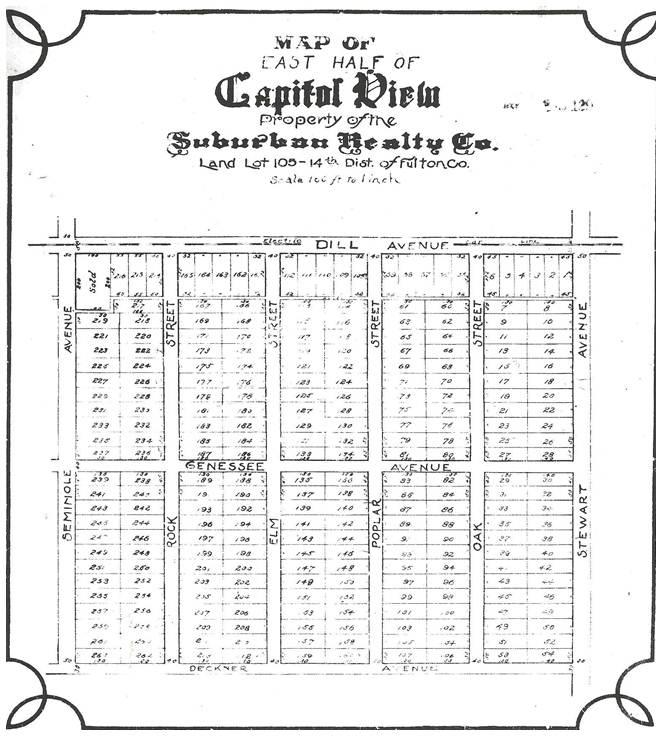
Original Capitol View plans east

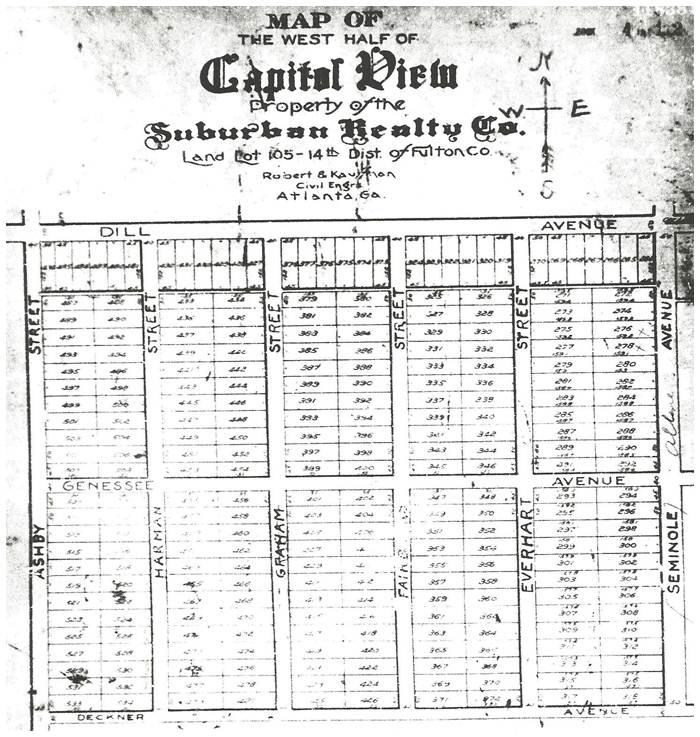
Original Capitol View plans west

In the first and second decades of the 1900s, the residential area now known as Capitol View was little more than a farm and pasture owned primarily by A.P. Stewart, "Uncle John" Shannon and the Deckner family. There were no paved streets, no electric lights and no sewage system.

In 1858, the 12 charter members of Capitol View Baptist Church (then located on Beatie Avenue) went to church by lantern light. About 1912, the church was organized as a mission under the Second Baptist Church of Atlanta. Between 1910 and 1914, the community began growing, largely due to the addition of a Masonic temple and pharmacy to the area. By 1913, utilities were installed, and Capitol View was annexed in the City of Atlanta.

The early 20th-century trolley system revolutionized Capitol View, and led to streets laid out in a grid pattern that has a longer north-south axis than east-west.

Commercial activity is concentrated along Dill Avenue, with a major commercial intersection at Dill and Metropolitan Parkway. This intersection has two prominent buildings, the 1921 Masonic temple and the 1927 Capitol View Baptist Church (demolished in 2016), as well as several smaller commercial buildings.

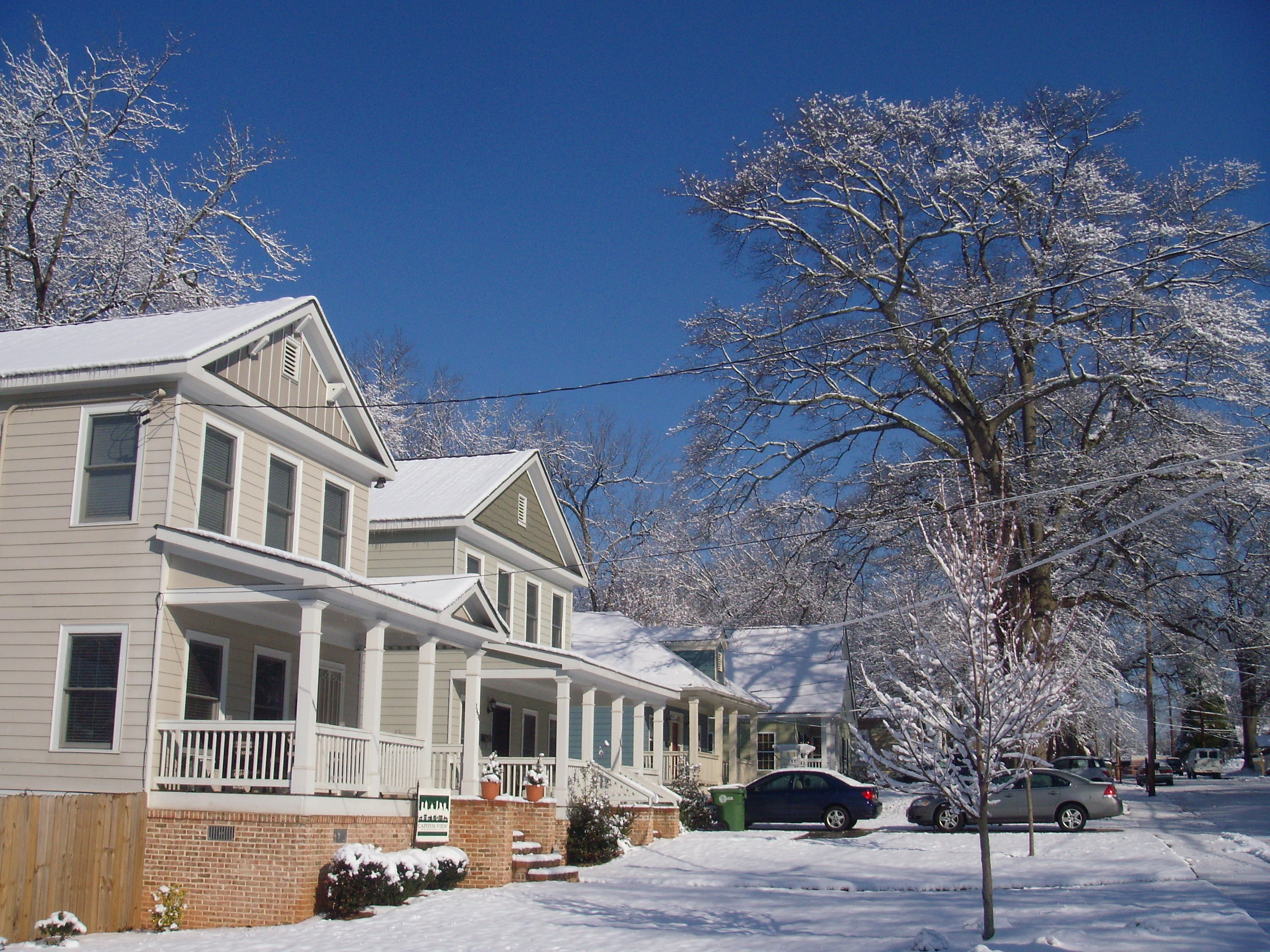
Capitol View streetscape

=== Urban renewal ===
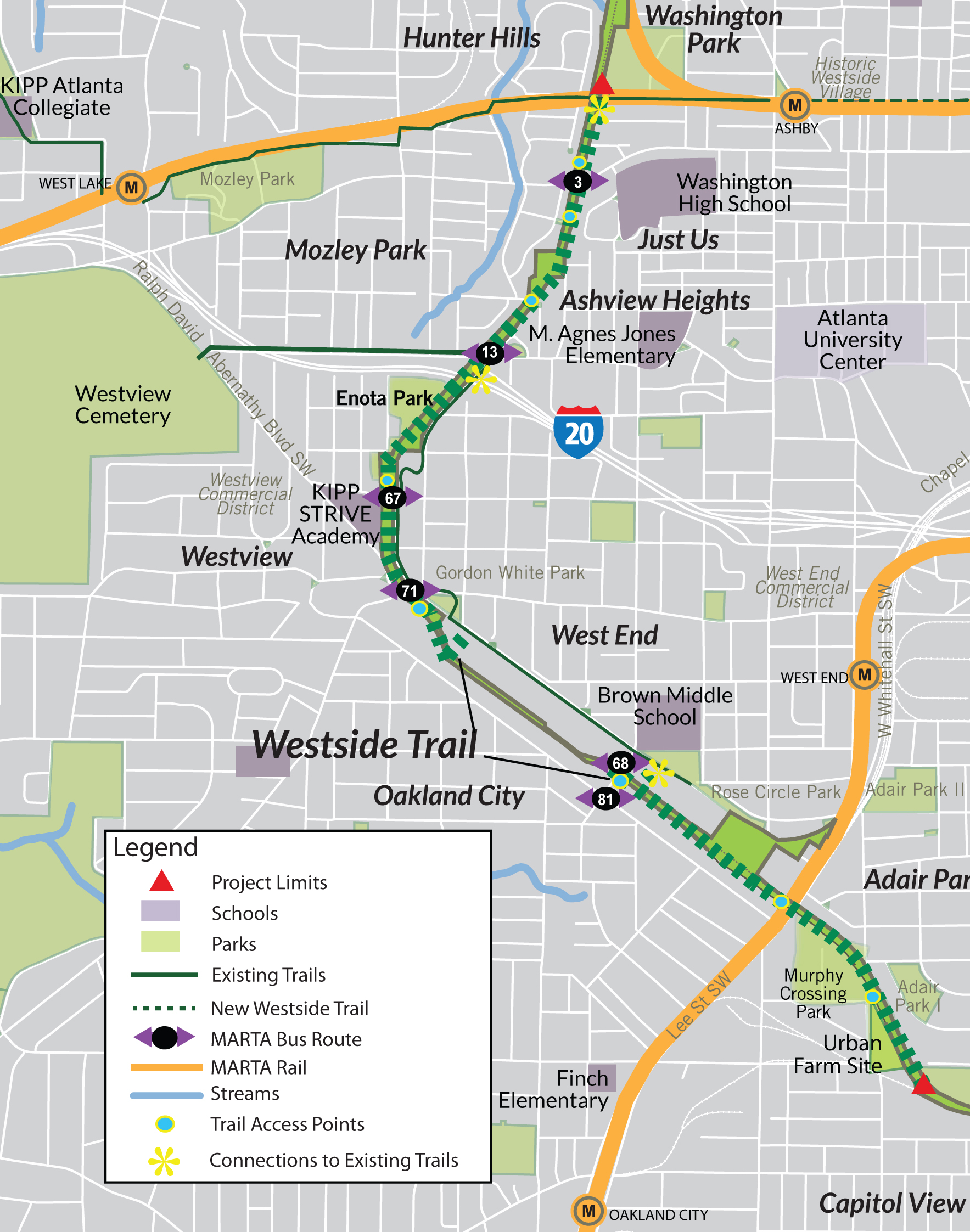
Atlanta Beltline Westside Trail

In the late 1990s, Stewart Avenue was renamed Metropolitan Parkway in an effort to shake the street's reputation as a haven of crime and prostitution. Since then, restoration of the area has helped to increase property values and reduce crime. The approval of a tax-allocation district for Metropolitan Parkway (although it does not include the Capitol View area) is predicted to help to revitalize a long-neglected business corridor. The redevelopment of the nearby Fort McPherson into a mixed-use development/movie studio in the future will provide employment opportunities. MARTA is also in the process of transitioning the Oakland City MARTA station into a transit-oriented development by converting existing parking lots into condos, apartments, and storefronts.

With the 2014 construction of the Beltline, the rising trend toward city living, and the new Metropolitan Branch library, Capitol View is seemingly on track for full revitalization like many other in-town Atlanta neighborhoods on the eastside.

=== Beltline Westside Trail ===
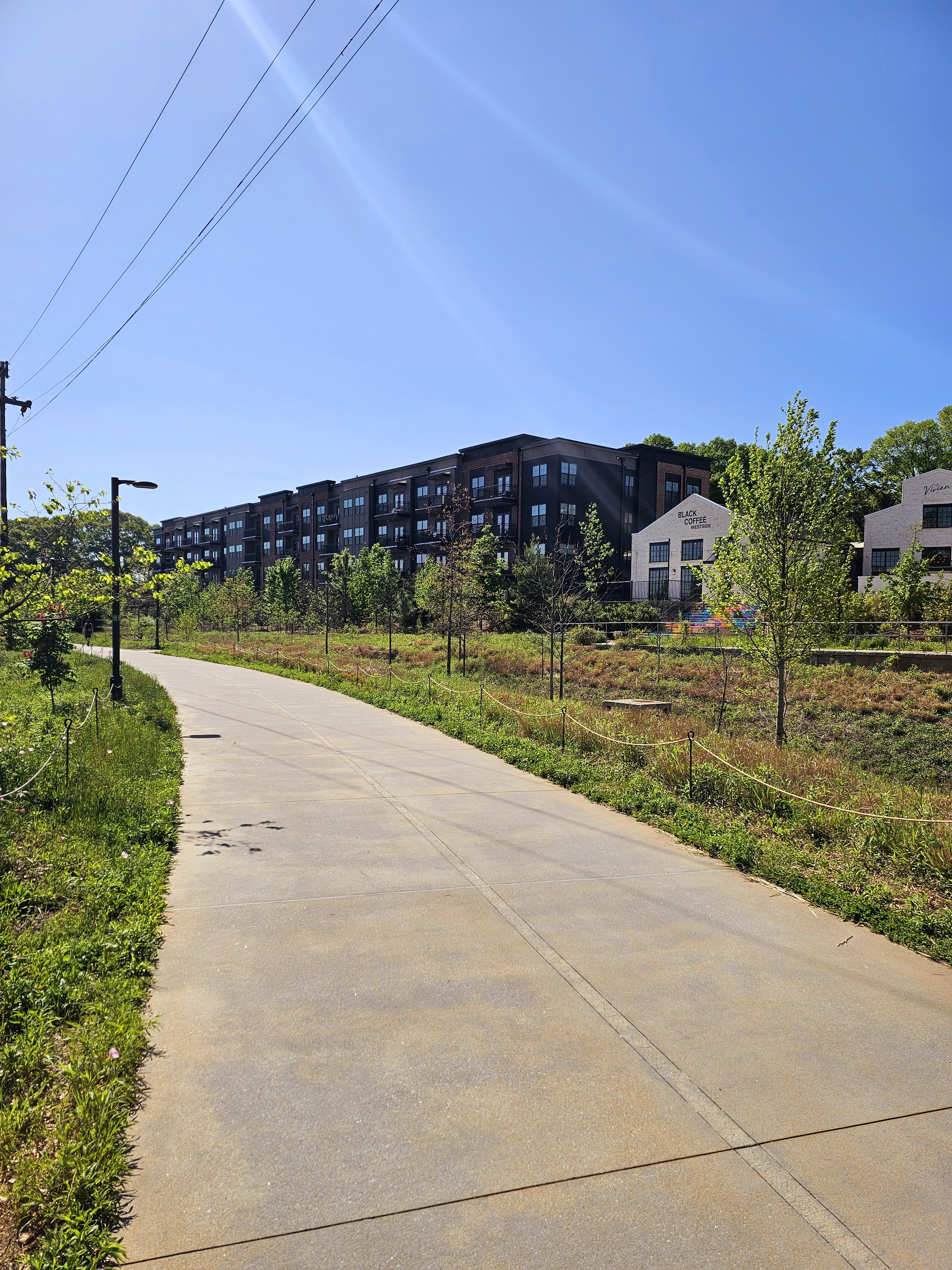
The Vivian and coffee shop along the Beltline

The Atlanta Beltline runs through the northern part of the Capitol View neighborhood, dropping south from Adair Park and crossing Metropolitan Avenue just north of Erin Avenue. From there, the Beltline heads into neighboring Capitol View Manor.

In September 2013, the City of Atlanta was awarded an $18 million TIGER V grant from the U.S. Department of Transportation to develop the southwest corridor of the Atlanta Beltline. In the second half of 2014, construction was scheduled to commence on the 3-mile Westside Trail. The trail will run along the northern edge of Capitol View, from University Avenue in Adair Park north to Lena Avenue at Washington Park in West End. For a half mile along White Street, the trail will use the existing West End Trail.

When completed, the Westside Trail will have a 14-foot wide concrete multi-use trail in this historic railroad corridor. The project will also include the construction of 14 access points, 11 of which are ADA-accessible, along with lighting, security cameras, signage, way-finding, mile-markers, and underground infrastructure. An expansion of the Atlanta Beltline arboretum will blend with hundreds of large, native trees, and integrate more than 30 acres of inviting and usable new green space. The project will be constructed in preparation for future transit that is currently in the planning stages. The Westside Trail connects four schools and four parks, as well as the residents of 10 southwest Atlanta neighborhoods to public transit, existing community businesses and future economic development sites.

The design of the Westside Trail project was led by Atlanta Beltline, Inc. in partnership with the Georgia Department of Transportation and support from a design team led by Kimley-Horn and Associates, Inc. The initial phase of a project this complex normally takes two years to complete. However, the process took only nine months, with the help of a unique partnership between the City of Atlanta, the Georgia Department of Transportation, the USDOT Federal Highway Administration, Atlanta Beltline, Inc. and its design team.

The construction was set to start in the fall of 2014, and was expected to take approximately 24 months.

In 2023, Vivian Luxury Apartments opened in the neighborhood along the Beltline. The apartment complex has 325 rental units and is adjacent to a newly built coffee shop.

== Neighborhood association ==
The Capitol View Neighborhood Association's mission is to improve the quality of life for Capitol View residents and to preserve, restore, and rejuvenate the neighborhood. It has subcommittees dedicated to Safety & Quality of Life, Beautification, Communication & Engagement, and Economic Development. Meetings are held on the third Saturday morning of every month.

== Transportation ==
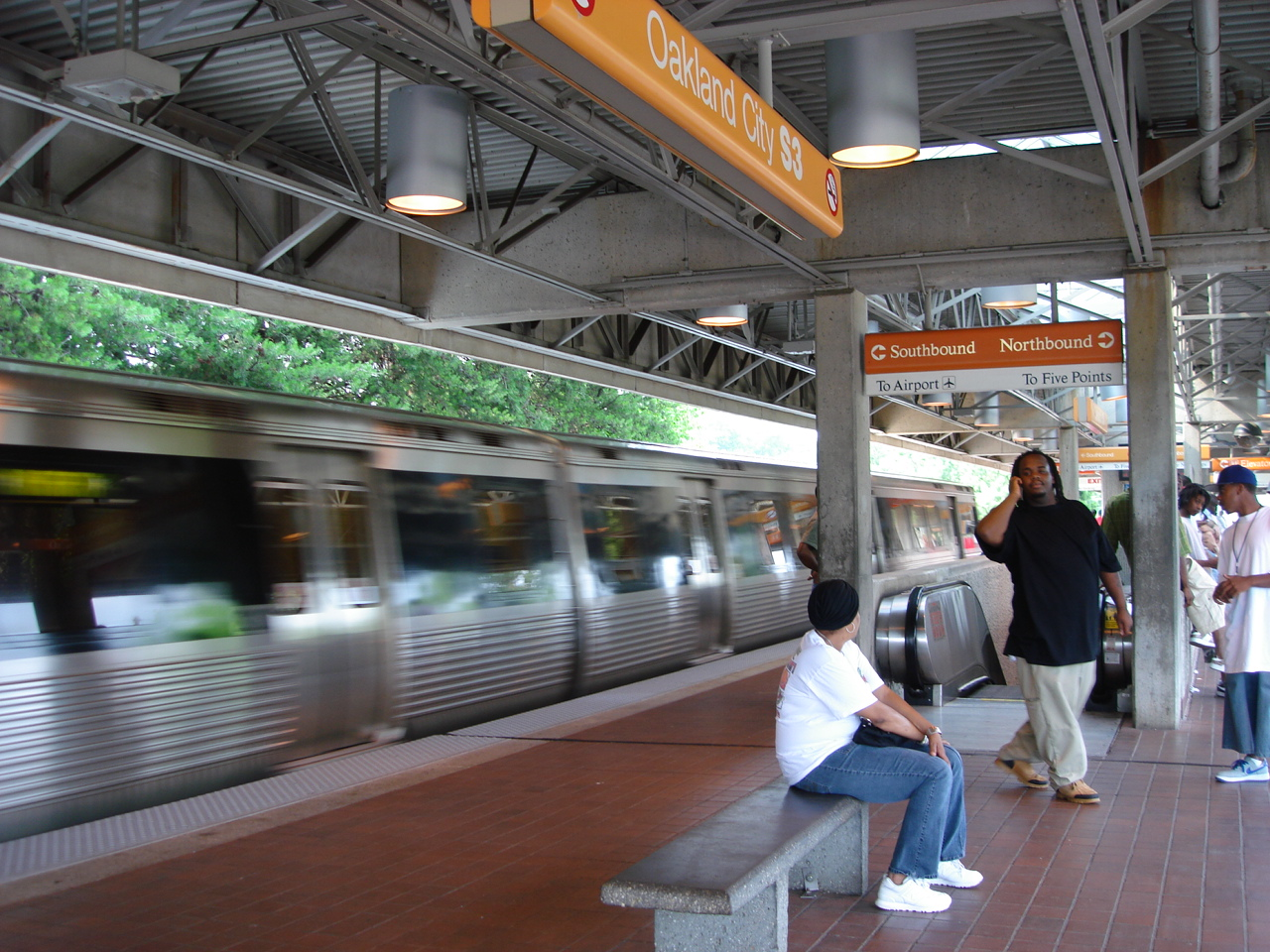
MARTA Oakland City train station

Capitol View is located just a few miles from Downtown Atlanta, Midtown Atlanta, Buckhead, College Park, East Point, Hartsfield-Jackson Atlanta International Airport, and major highways and interstates such as the Downtown Connector/I-75/I-85, I-20, and Metropolitan Parkway.

=== Public transportation ===
Capitol View is located directly on the Red/Gold Lines of the MARTA line, with a neighborhood stop at the Oakland City station. This allows easy public transit options to the Atlanta area and beyond. In addition, MARTA bus stops are found along the perimeter of the neighborhood and surrounding areas.

=== Oakland City MARTA station layout ===
P Platform level	Southbound	← Gold Line toward Airport (Lakewood / Fort McPherson) ← Red Line toward Airport (Lakewood / Fort McPherson)
P Platform level	Island platform, doors will open on the left
P Platform level	Northbound	Gold Line toward Doraville (West End) → Red Line toward North Springs (West End) →
G	Street level	Entrance/exit, fare barriers
L	Lower level	Passageway from street to platforms

== Housing ==
Most homes in Capitol View were built during the first half of the twentieth century. Earlier home styles were primarily Country Victorians and Craftsman Bungalows, while later housing stock included Cape Cods and Colonials. Most houses feature wide front porches and back decks looking out on spacious backyards. Also diversity has greatly increased since the 2010s. Today, houses in the neighborhood run the gamut of fixer-uppers to fully renovated historic homes to brand-new construction.

Prices reflect the condition, size, and location of the property, and, as of May 2024, range from $300,000 to $700,000. The neighborhood also has several industrial buildings which have been converted to lofts and are a part of the Coeur D'Allene loft complex.

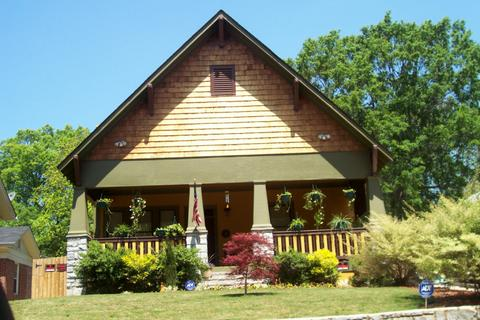

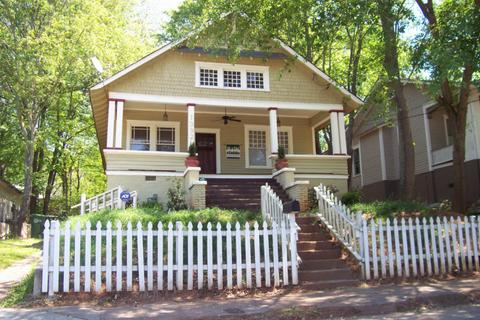

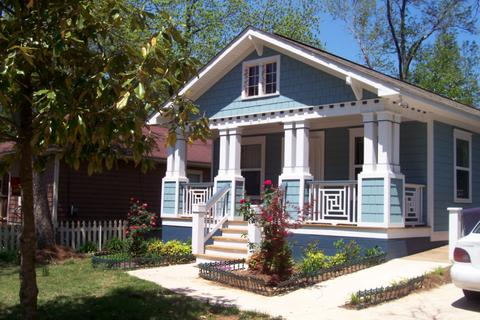

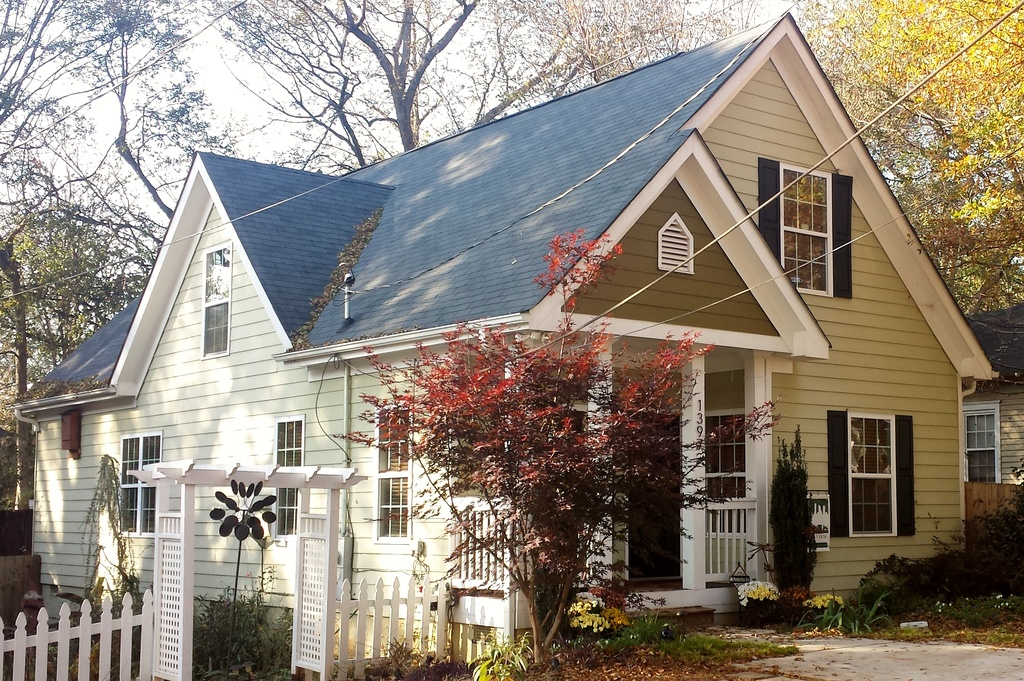

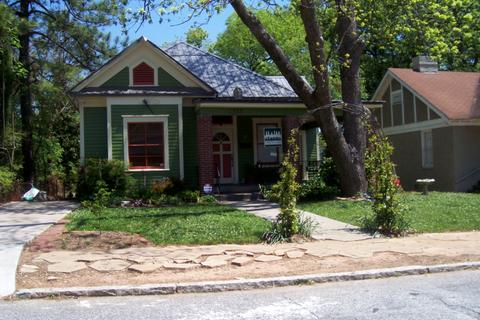

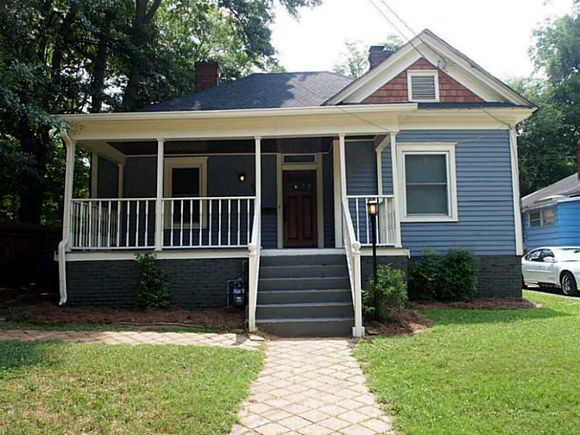

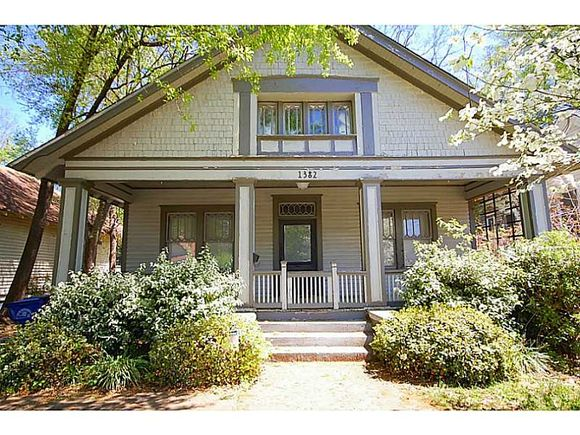

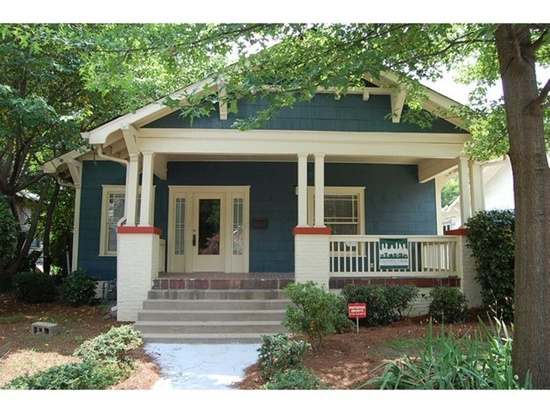

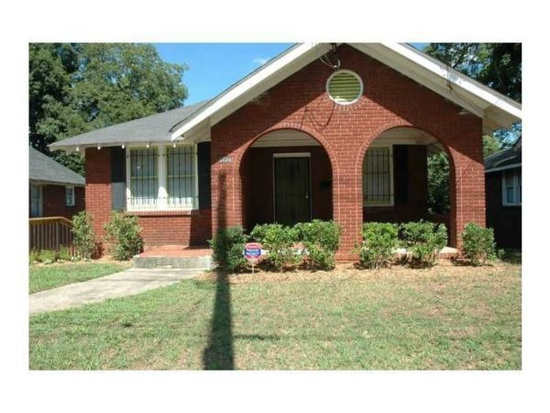

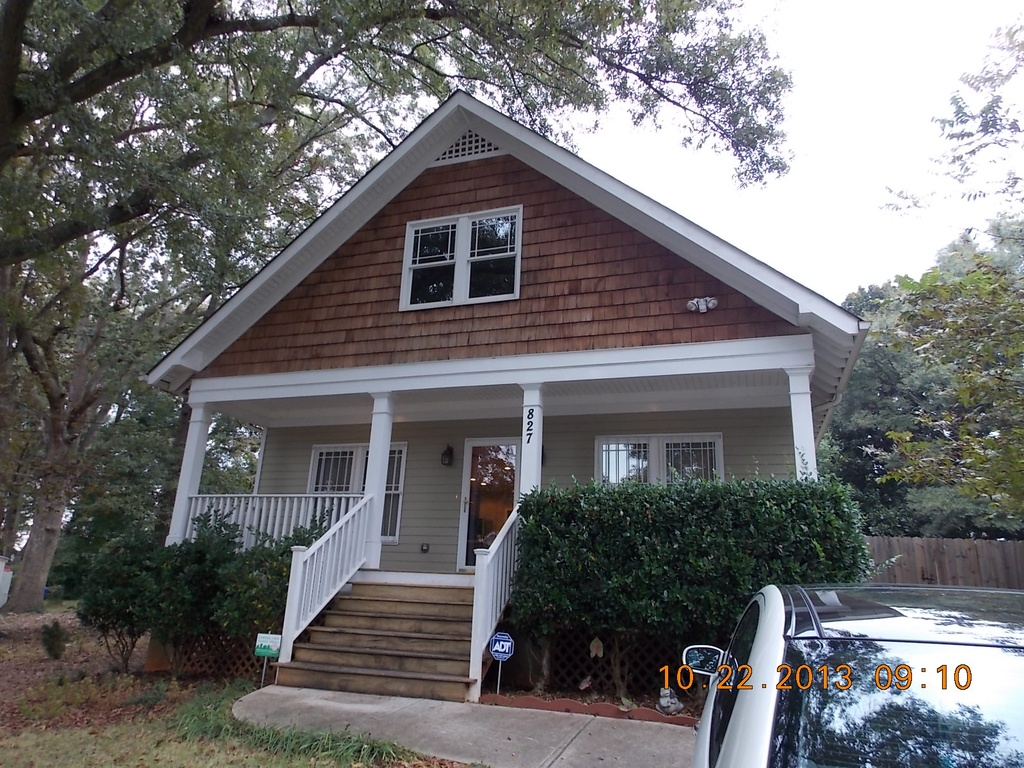

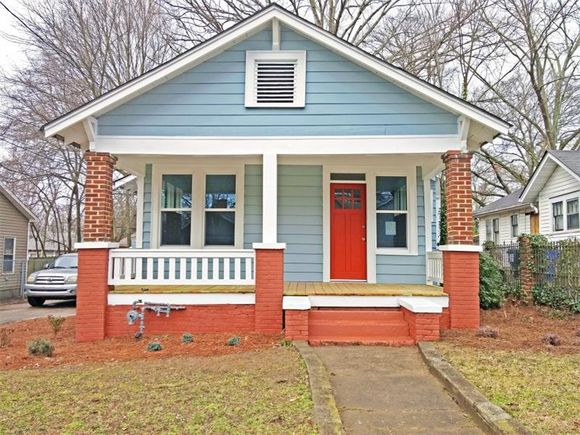

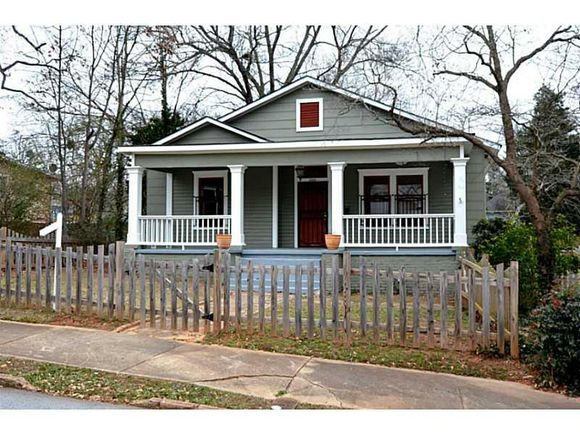

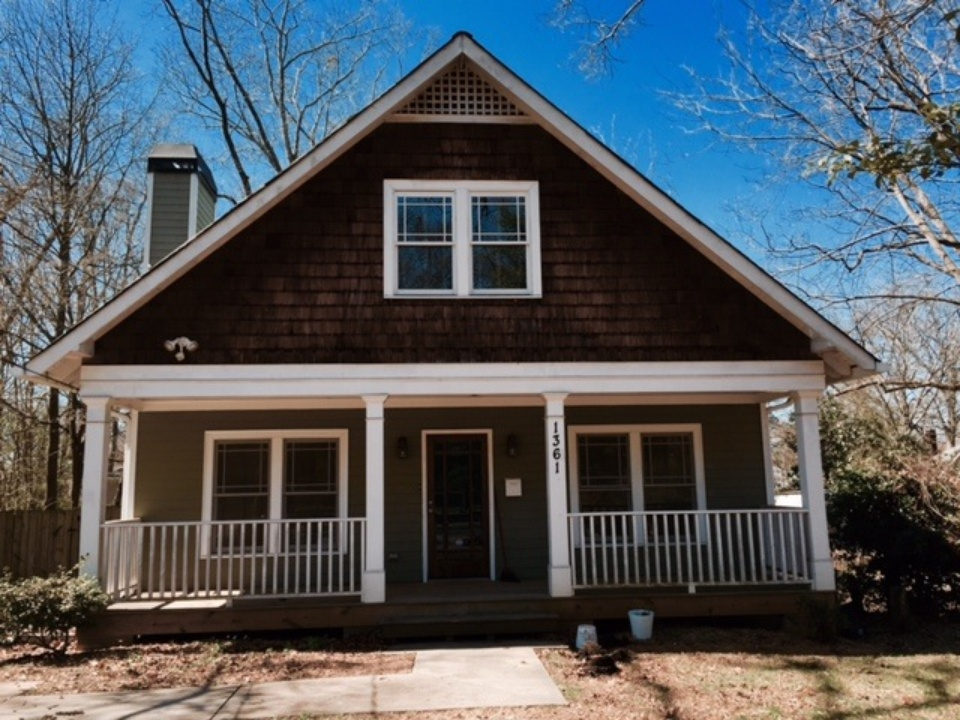

== Parks and recreation ==
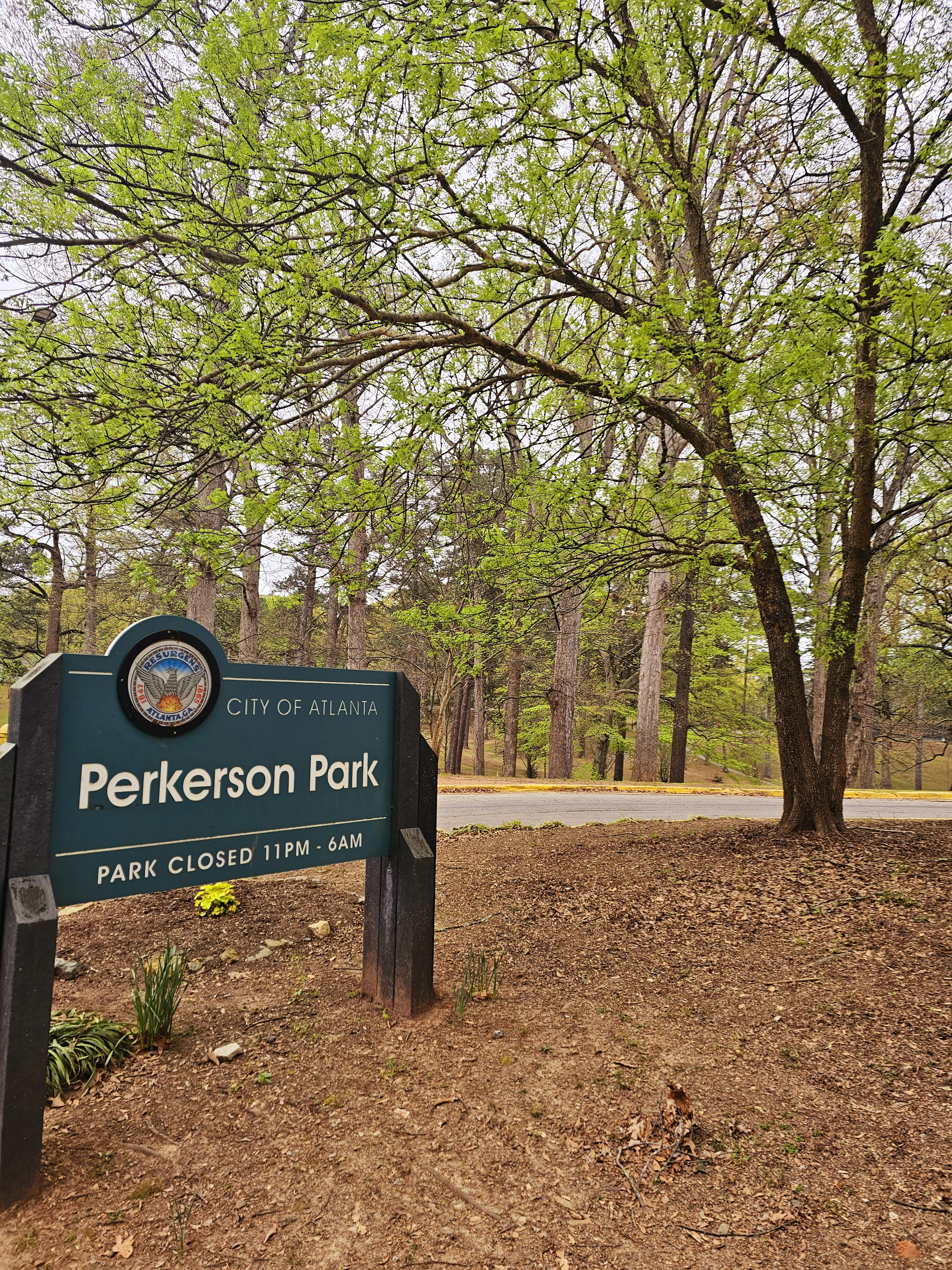
Perkerson Park in early spring

Capitol View is located between Perkerson Park and the proposed Atlanta Beltline park system. Capitol View also shares the park with the nearby Sylvan Hills neighborhood. Perkerson is a 50-acre (200,000 m^{2}) park with a large pavilion and several other picnic facilities. A new playground was recently installed during a renovation of the park's recreation center. In March 2010, the Friends of Perkerson Park, a community volunteer group, hosted the first "Spring Forward Festival" which raised money to make improvements to the park.

The park also features the following sport amenities:

- Basketball courts
- Tennis courts
- Baseball, softball, and Little League fields
- Sprayground

Perkerson Park is home to one of two disc golf courses in the city of Atlanta.

Capitol View is between two of the six targeted economic development areas on the Atlanta Beltline: Murphy's Crossing, directly north, and University/Metropolitan to the east.

== Education ==
=== Atlanta Public Schools ===
The Atlanta Public Schools for the neighborhood are:

- Carver Early College High School
- Perkerson Elementary School
- Sylvan Hills Middle School

=== Colleges and universities ===
Many colleges are located within a few miles of Capitol View. These include:

- Atlanta Metropolitan College
- Atlanta Technical College
- Clark Atlanta University
- Georgia Institute of Technology
- Georgia State University
- Morehouse College

=== Metropolitan Library ===
In 2015, the Atlanta–Fulton Public Library System completed construction of the Metropolitan Library in the neighborhood at 1332 Metropolitan Parkway, Atlanta, GA 30310. The library was part of a $275 million building initiative established in 2008 that brought eight new and two expanded libraries to the Atlanta metro area.
