= Metropolitan Parkway =

Metropolitan Parkway may refer to:

- Metropolitan Parkway (Atlanta), Georgia, United States
- Metropolitan Parkway (Detroit area), Michigan, United States

== See also ==
- Metropolitan Boulevard (disambiguation)
