= Capitol View Manor =

Community in Atlanta, Georgia, US

Coordinates: 33.717629°N 84.405688°W

Capitol View Manor is a small community in Southwest Atlanta, Georgia, United States. It was named for its view of the Georgia State Capitol building. Its boundaries include I-75/85 to the east, the Beltline to the north, Metropolitan Parkway to the west, and Atlanta Technical College to the south.

== History ==
=== Early history ===
Capitol View Manor was originally vast farmland owned by people including John Shannon and the Deckner family. During the early 1910s, many people started to settle in the area. In 1912, the area known as Capitol View was annexed to the City of Atlanta. This is when many utilities, including sewage and electricity, came to the area. In 1920, Capitol View Manor was established, and more houses started to be built on the eastern side of Stewart Avenue. Five years later, Capitol View Manor was annexed to the City of Atlanta. Most of the homes in this neighborhood were built in the next twenty years. The Capitol View School was built in 1929.

=== Decline ===
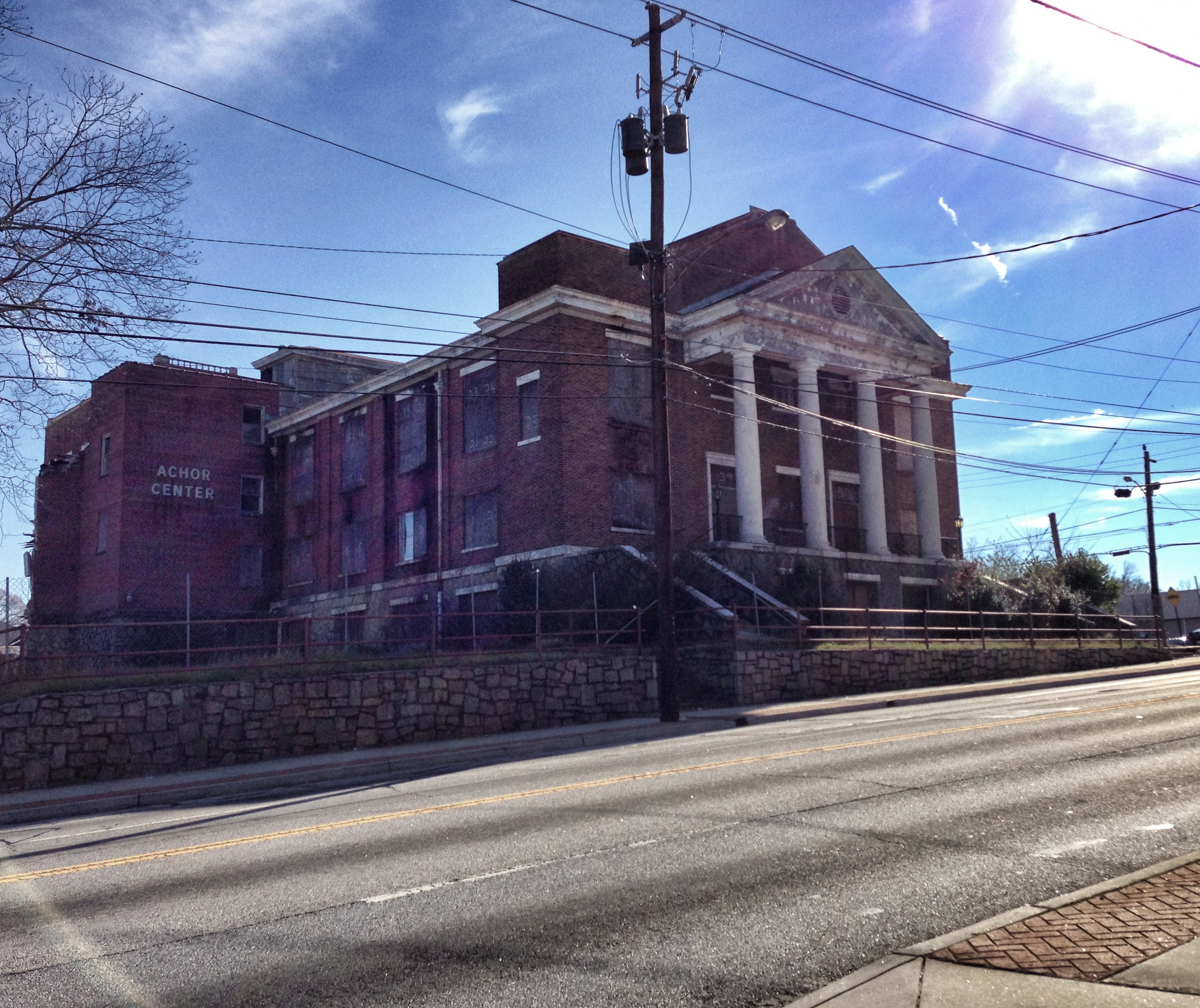
Former Capitol View Baptist Church

During the mid-20th century, Interstate 75-85 cut through the land to the east of the neighborhood, separating Capitol View Manor from what is now known as High Pointe Estates, cutting Manford Road in two, and destroying the intersection of Hillside and Deckner in the southeast corner of the neighborhood. In this timeframe, "white flight" occurred in the neighborhood. Few white people stayed, and the neighborhood fell into decline.

=== Renewal ===
In the late 1990s, Stewart Avenue was renamed Metropolitan Parkway so the street would not be referred to as a red-light district. Since then, many efforts have been made to revitalize the area: more retail has come to the area, the Beltline Tax Allocation District has helped improve the area, and investors have renovated many damaged homes so property values and demand are rising again. The Pittsburgh Yards project located across the Southside Beltline trail from CVM also promises to be an economic catalyst for the area, bringing new jobs, opportunities for small businesses, community engagement, and green space.

== Housing ==
Most of the homes in Capitol View Manor were built between the early 1920s and the mid-1940s. Earlier home styles include bungalows, Victorians, Cape Cods, and Colonials. Most of the later homes were ranches. Capitol View Manor was originally developed by the same developer of the Morningside and Virginia Highland neighborhood. The rolling streets are a calming contrast to the street-car grid neighborhoods neighboring CVM. As of 2023, homes in the neighborhood were some of the most affordable within the city limits for their location, uniqueness and quality; they ranged from $300,000 to $650,000.

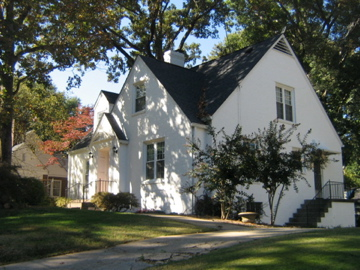

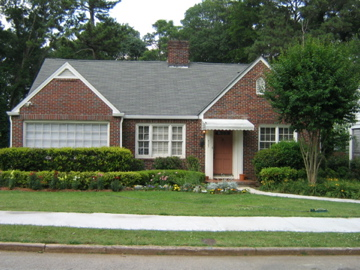

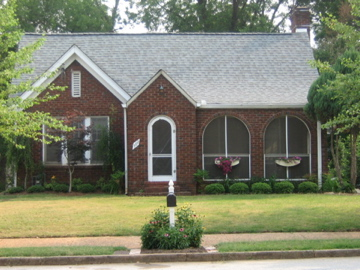

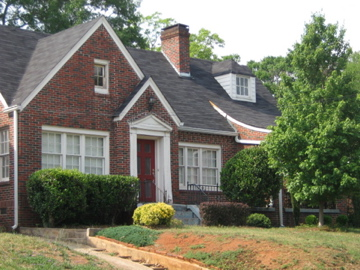

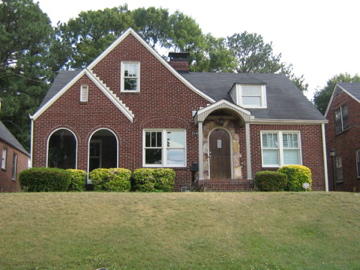

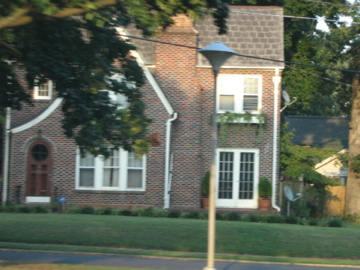

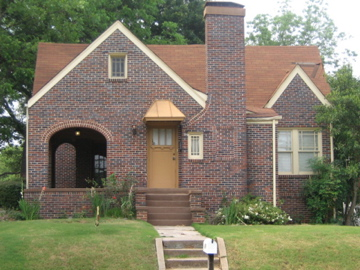

== Parks and recreation ==
Dill Triangle Park

Emma Millican Park prior to renovation

Capitol View Manor is close to many recreational amenities, including the 10-acre (40,000 m^{2}) Millican Park, the 50-acre (200,000 m^{2}) Perkerson Park, the 28-acre (110,000 m^{2}) Hillside Park, and the Carver Family YMCA.

Emma Millican Park is the largest available green space in the neighborhood. It is at the western stub of Deckner Avenue, and offers a playground, shaded walking trails, a pavilion, open green space and creek. In 2005, this park was chosen to undergo the Park Pride Visioning Process, in which community members came up with a master plan for their neighborhood park.

The Dill Triangle Park is often used as a garden and a gathering place and is decorated for the holidays every December by the neighborhood association.

== Landmarks ==
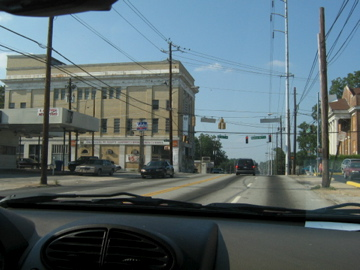
Postal Union building

Capitol View Manor is home to Liberty International Church.

The former 80-year-old Capitol View Baptist Church was demolished in 2014 to make way for the Metropolitan Branch Library. Attempts to remodel the church as the new library were cost-prohibitive, but neighbors were able to get the marble columns and stained glass windows saved to be repurposed at the new library.

The 102-year-old Deckner house (which was the residence of the Deckner family), Fire Station 20, Advance Auto Parts, and the yellow-brick Postal Union building are also neighborhood landmarks.

The Southside trail of the Beltline spans the entire northern boundary along Erin Avenue.

== Education ==
Former Capitol View Elementary School

The schools for the neighborhood are:

- Elementary-Perkerson Elementary School
- Middle-Sylvan Middle School
- High-Carver High School

The Atlanta Technical College and the Atlanta Metropolitan College are due south of the neighborhood.

=== Metropolitan Library ===
The Atlanta–Fulton Public Library System opened the Metropolitan Branch Library at 1332 Metropolitan Parkway on October 1, 2015. The library now serves as the polling location for CVM and several surrounding neighborhoods and is a hub for community engagement.
