= Stewart-Lakewood Center =

Shopping center in Atlanta, Georgia

Coordinates: 33°41′56″N 84°24′33″W

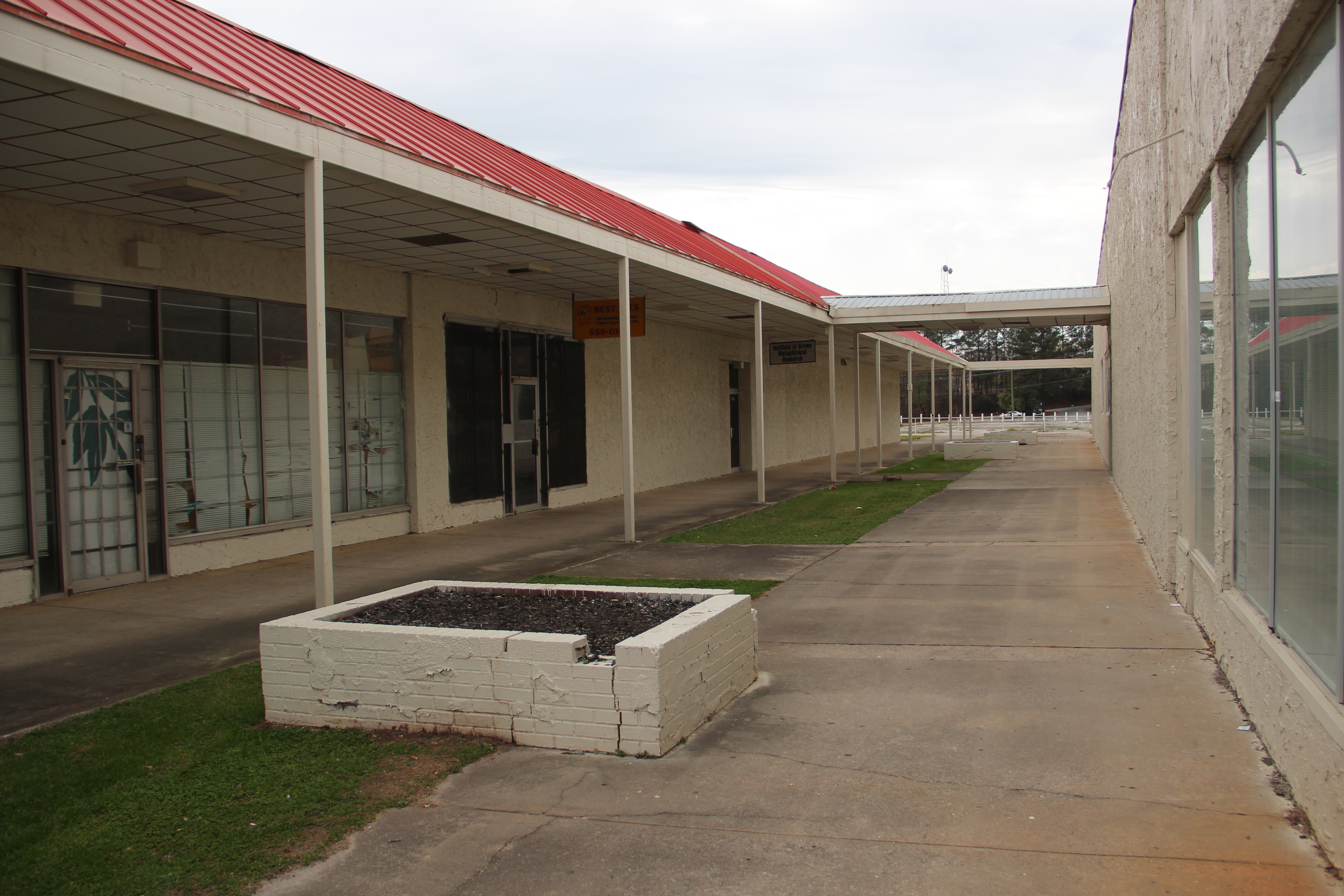
Stewart-Lakewood Center in 2018

Crossroads Shopping Center, better known by its name in its heyday, Stewart-Lakewood Center, is an open-air shopping center on Metropolitan Parkway (formerly Stewart Avenue) at Langford Parkway (formerly Lakewood Freeway) in the Sylvan Hills neighborhood of southern Atlanta. It was built in 1962 by the same company and in the same style as Ansley Mall near Midtown Atlanta. It was considered a major regional retail center.

Tenants at one time or another included J.C. Penney, Lerner's, Woolworth, Woolco, Warehouse Grocery, Otasco, Colonial Stores grocery (later a Big Star Market), Western Auto, Rhodes Furniture, W.T. Grant, Lee's Men's Shop, Dipper Dan's Ice Cream, Bell Brothers Shoes, the Stewart-Lakewood Fabric Center and a National Shirt Shop.

Lubie Geter, one of the children murdered in the Atlanta murders of 1979–1981, was last seen at the Stewart-Lakewood Center.

Today part of the original 40+ unit mall has been demolished. A handful of the remaining units are occupied by a dollar store, wig store, and others. In 2005 Atlanta newspaper Creative Loafing named it one of "five undiscovered redevelopment gems".

The center was the filming location, representing for the Reseda, California strip mall in home to the Cobra Kai dojo in the hit 2018 Netflix series Cobra Kai, the spin-off of the original 1984 film, The Karate Kid.
