= Piedmont Heights, Atlanta =

Piedmont Heights
- Neighborhoods of Atlanta
- Location of Piedmont Heights within central Atlanta
- Coordinates: 33.803043°N 84.370816°W
- Country: United States
- State: Georgia
- County: Fulton County
- City: City of Atlanta
- NPU: F

Population (2000)
  - Total: 1,899

Demographics (2000)
  - White/Other: 87%
  - Black: 8%
  - Asian: 2%
  - Hispanic: 4%
- ZIP Code: 30324
- Website: Piedmont Heights Civic Association

Piedmont Heights is an intown neighborhood on the east side of Atlanta, Georgia, founded in the early 20th century as a streetcar suburb. It is located between the BeltLine on the west; across from the Sherwood Forest neighborhood; I-85 on the north, across from an industrial area (Armour Drive); and Piedmont Avenue/Road and Morningside-Lenox Park on the east.

== History ==
Originally the area was open country. The second oldest house in Atlanta is located here, a two-story frame Liddell house on Montgomery Ferry, built circa 1860. The first references to Piedmont Heights at the county tax offices are from 1912. The area was developed during the 1930s, 1940s and 1950s.

Largely due to efforts by the Morningside civic association MPLA, construction of I-485 was avoided which would have gone either close to or through part of Piedmont Heights.

== Commercial districts ==
Ansley Mall, originally built in 1968 as an outdoor mall, now a hybrid of outdoor mall and strip mall, is located at the southern tip of Piedmont Heights. There is additional retail along Monroe Drive and Piedmont. Ansley Mall is a historic open-air shopping mall that opened in the 1960s.

== Education ==
The community is zoned to Atlanta Public Schools.

== Parks ==
Gotham Park is owned by the residents of Piedmont Heights (and not by the City of Atlanta), and it is run and maintained through the Gotham Park Committee of the Piedmont Heights Civic Association. In addition, Piedmont Park is diagonally across from the southern tip of Piedmont Heights.
