= Metropolitan Boulevard =

Metropolitan Boulevard may refer to:

- Interstate 195 (Maryland), south of Baltimore to the Baltimore-Washington International Airport
- The elevated portion of Quebec Autoroute 40 in Montreal

== See also ==
- Metropolitan Parkway (disambiguation)
