= Perkerson Park =

Park in Georgia, US

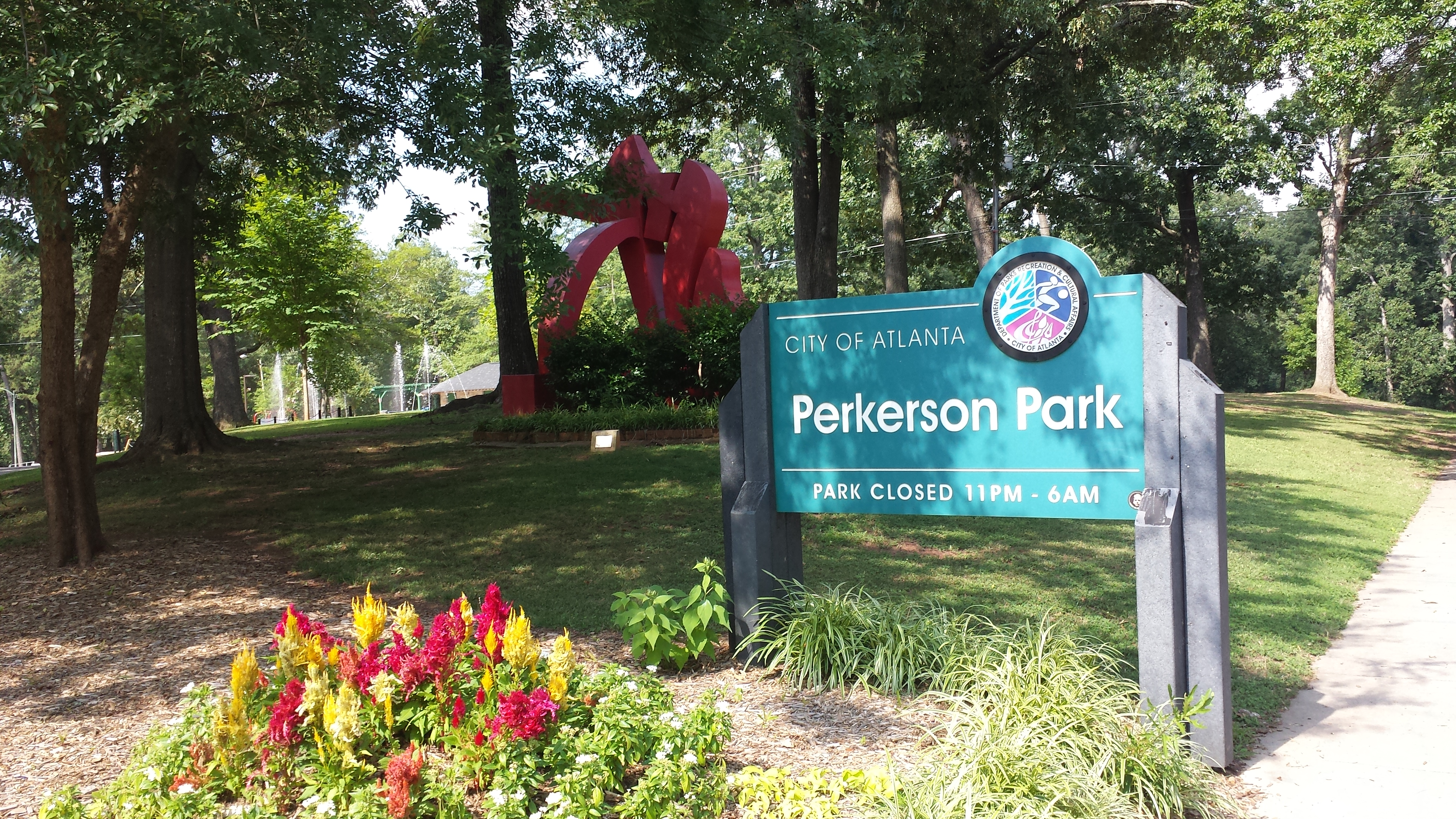
- Interactive map of Perkerson Park
- Location: Atlanta, Georgia
- Coordinates: 33°42′48″N 84°24′48″W
- Area: 50 acres (200,000 m^{2})
- Established: 1945; 81 years ago
- Operator: Atlanta Department of Parks and Recreation
- Open: 6 AM – 11PM daily
- Website: Official website

Perkerson Park is a 50-acre (200,000 m^{2}) park in the Capitol View and Sylvan Hills neighborhoods of Atlanta, Georgia, United States. It includes a disc golf course, six tennis courts, basketball half-court, splash pads, an elaborate playground, and recreational fields, all under the shady canopy of huge oak trees. The park is open from 6:00 AM to 11:00 PM daily.

== History ==
Originally, the park land was the family farm of the Perkerson family. Thomas Jefferson Perkerson was the first sheriff of Fulton County, upon its creation in 1853 from DeKalb County. His son, Angus M. Perkerson (1843–1895), served in the Confederate Army and later served as the sheriff of Fulton County from 1873 to 1883. His son, also named Angus M. Perkerson, became the editor of the Atlanta Journal Magazine.

In 1944, 315 acres of the Perkerson estate were sold, including the 50 acres that now make up Perkerson Park, which was donated by the Perkerson family to the City of Atlanta. The park was created circa 1952 by the city, and is a contributing property to the city. It is the largest green space and only public park in the Capitol View Historic District. It covers approximately 50 acres in the southwest portion of the district, and serves as a community public space.

The park has a sculpture which was created circa 1985 by Toby Martin, entitled My Spirit is Changing.

== Amenities ==
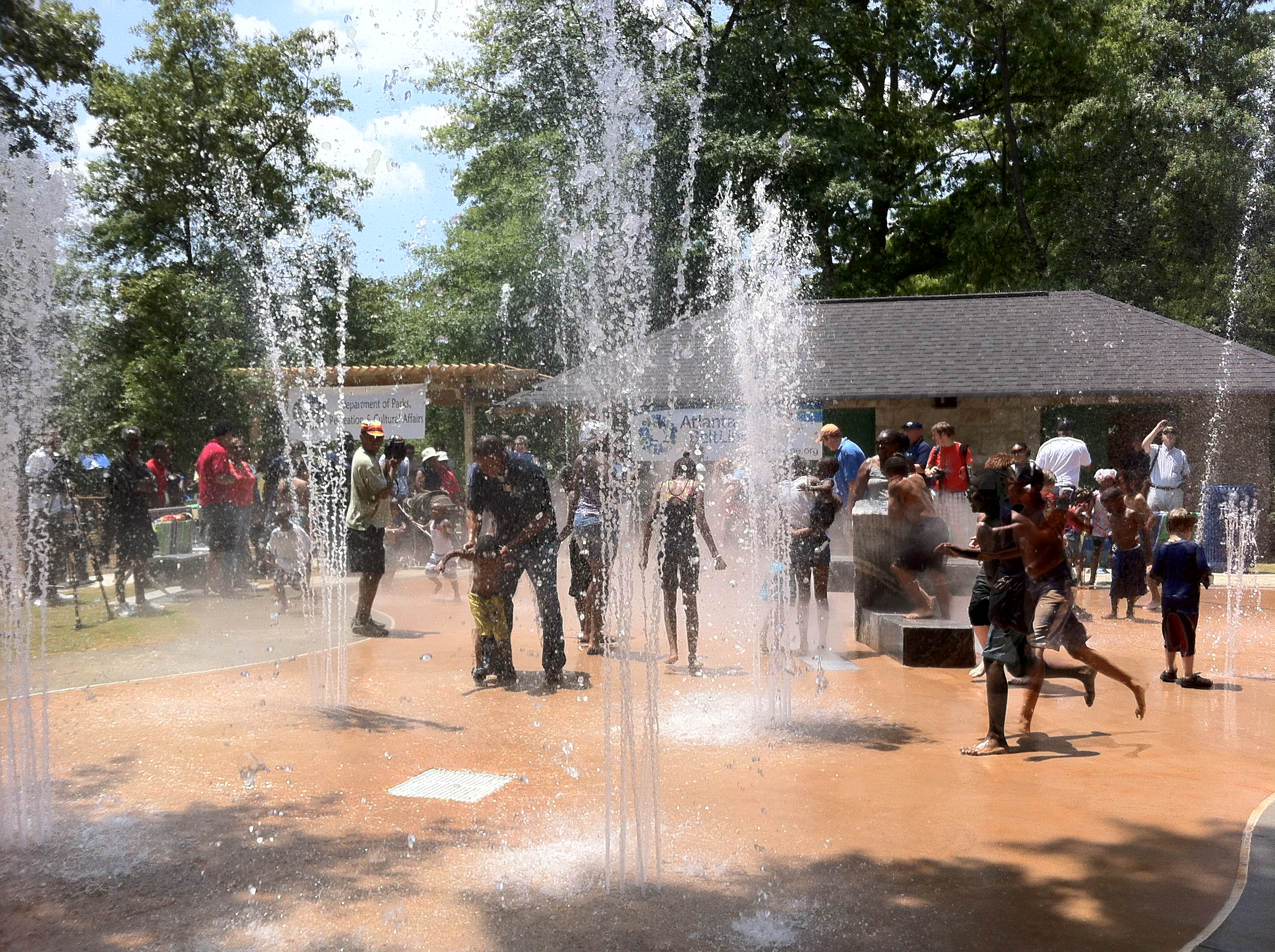
Perkerson Park splash pad

Perkerson Park is both an active and a passive park. Amenities include:

- Playground area
- Splash pad
- Recreation center
- Tennis courts
- Basketball courts
- Baseball, football, and recreational fields
- Permanent disc golf course
- Covered picnic pavilion with grills

It also has open fields, a sizeable creek, and large wooded areas.

The recreation building is used for multiple purposes, such as continuing education and neighborhood meetings. It is also a local polling facility.

=== Splash pad ===
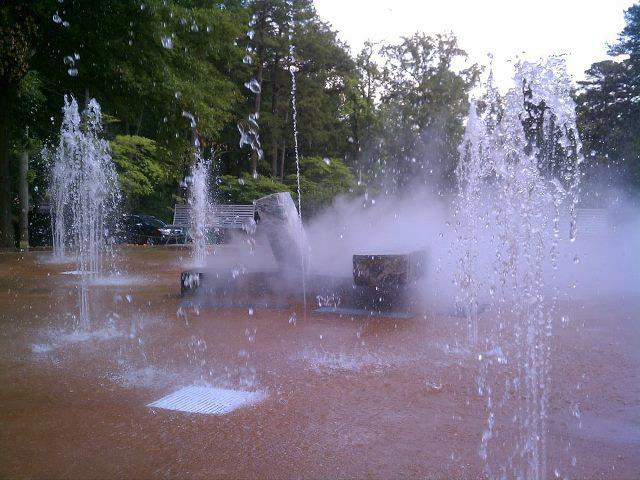
Perkerson Park splash pad

In May 2012, the splash pad opened in Perkerson Park, thanks to joint efforts from Councilmember Joyce Sheperd; the Department of Parks, Recreation, and Cultural Affairs; and the Atlanta Beltline. The splash pad is open daily, 10 a.m. until 8 p.m., from May 1 through October 1.

=== Disc golf course ===
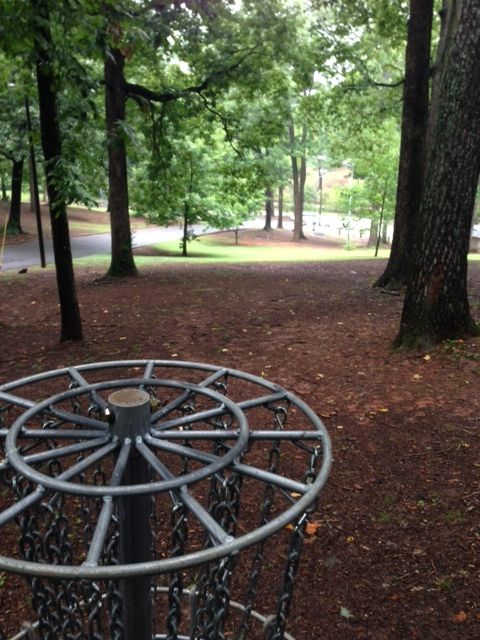
Perkerson disc golf Hole #6

Perkerson Park is the site of the only permanent public disc golf course in the city of Atlanta. This is a championship caliber course and one of metro Atlanta's most scenic, most challenging, and longest courses, with several par 4s and a par 5.

== Future expansion ==
The Perkerson Park Master Plan identifies three vacant parcels well suited for park expansion. The parcels are just south of the existing park boundary, and would extend the park to Casplan Street near the intersection of Metropolitan Parkway. The total expansion area would be roughly 10.5 acres.

Renovations and improvements are under way to restore the park stream, add street parking, improve the ball field and tennis court, expand the playground, add new pedestrian gateways, add pedestrian pathways, and construct an event lawn with a dedicated stage.

== Friends of Perkerson Park ==
Friends of Perkerson Park is an organized group of local residents and volunteers committed to improving and maintaining the quality of the park. The organization has raised funds and advocated for new amenities and quality services from the city.

== Gallery ==
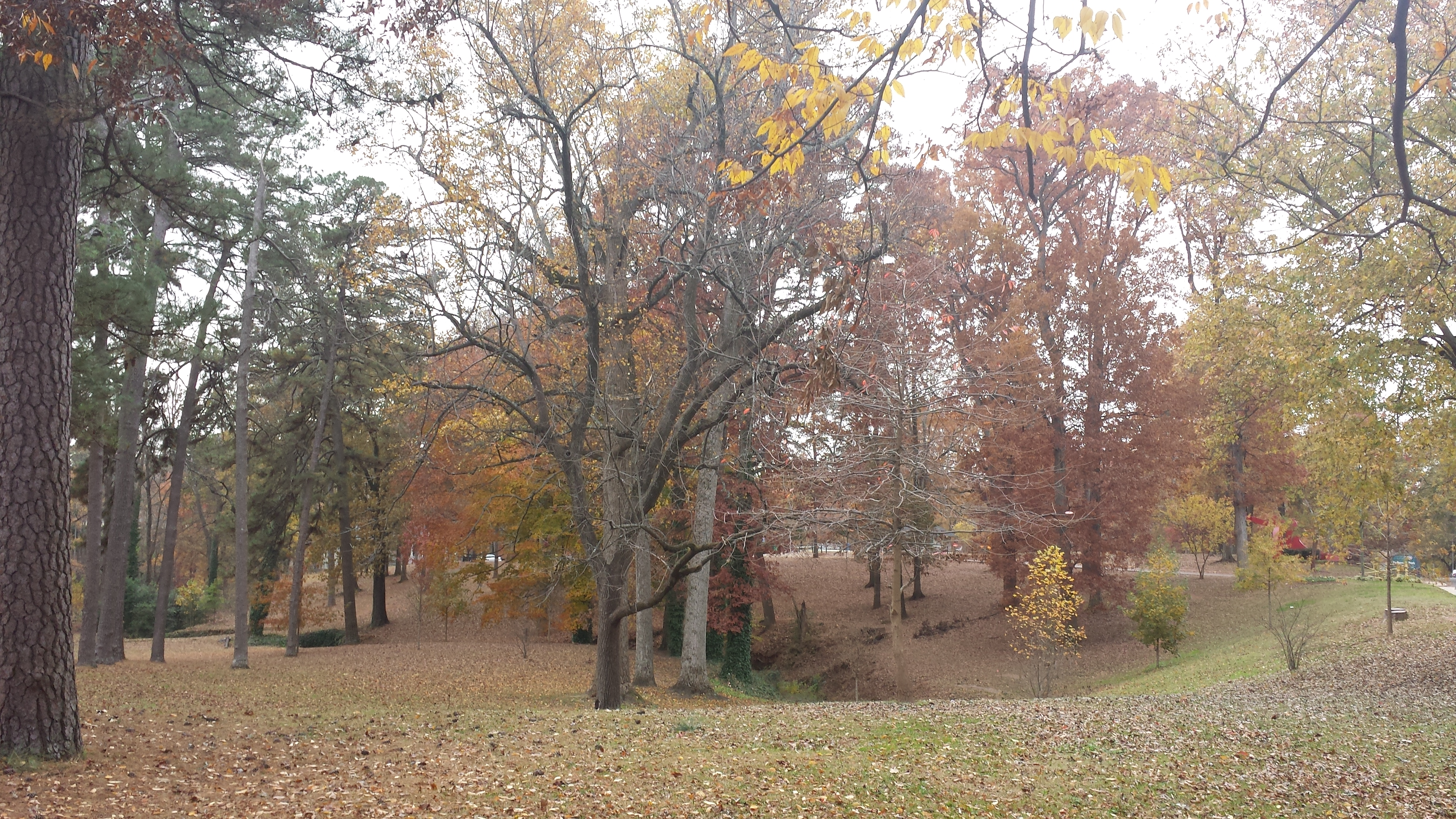

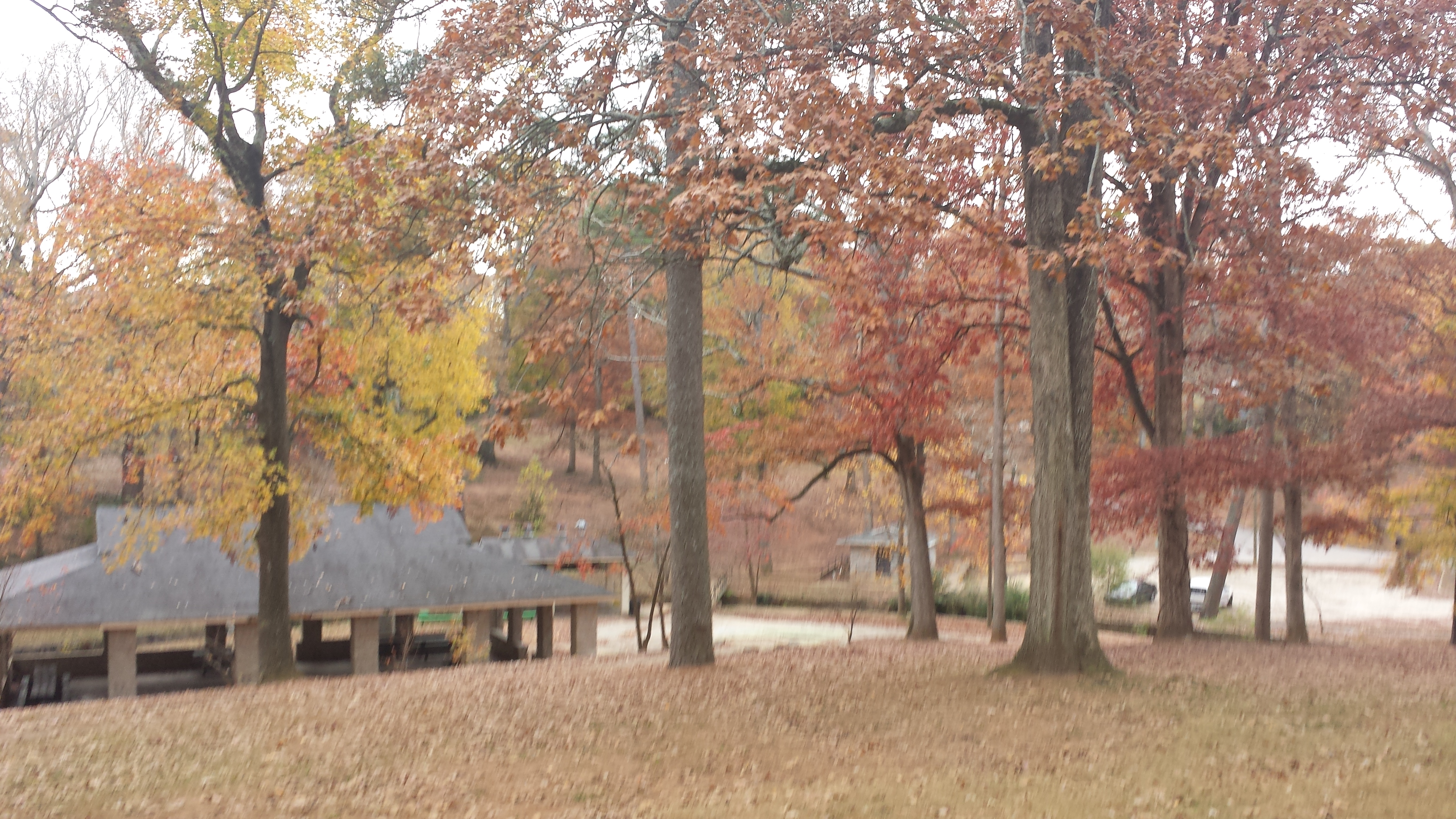

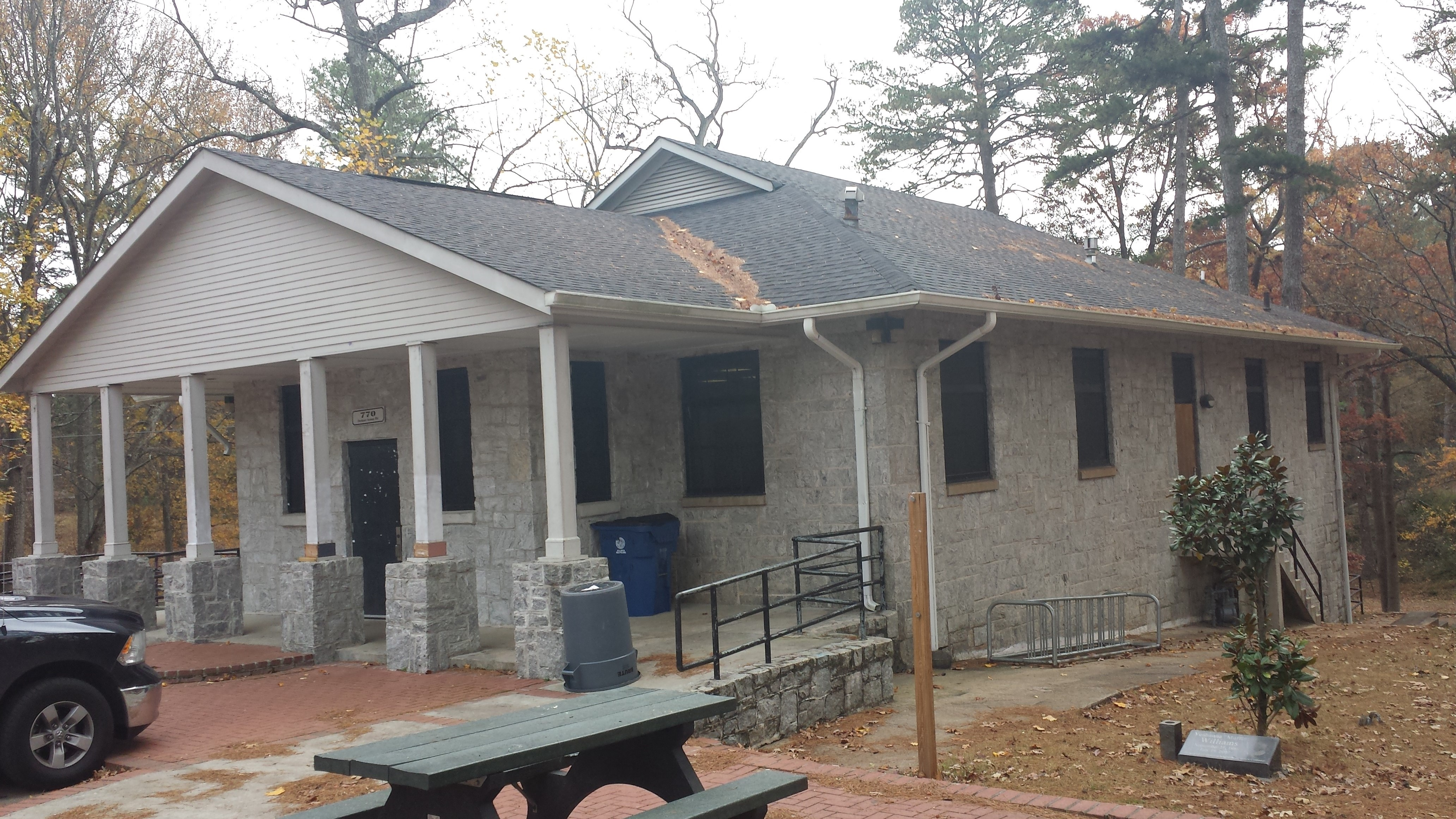

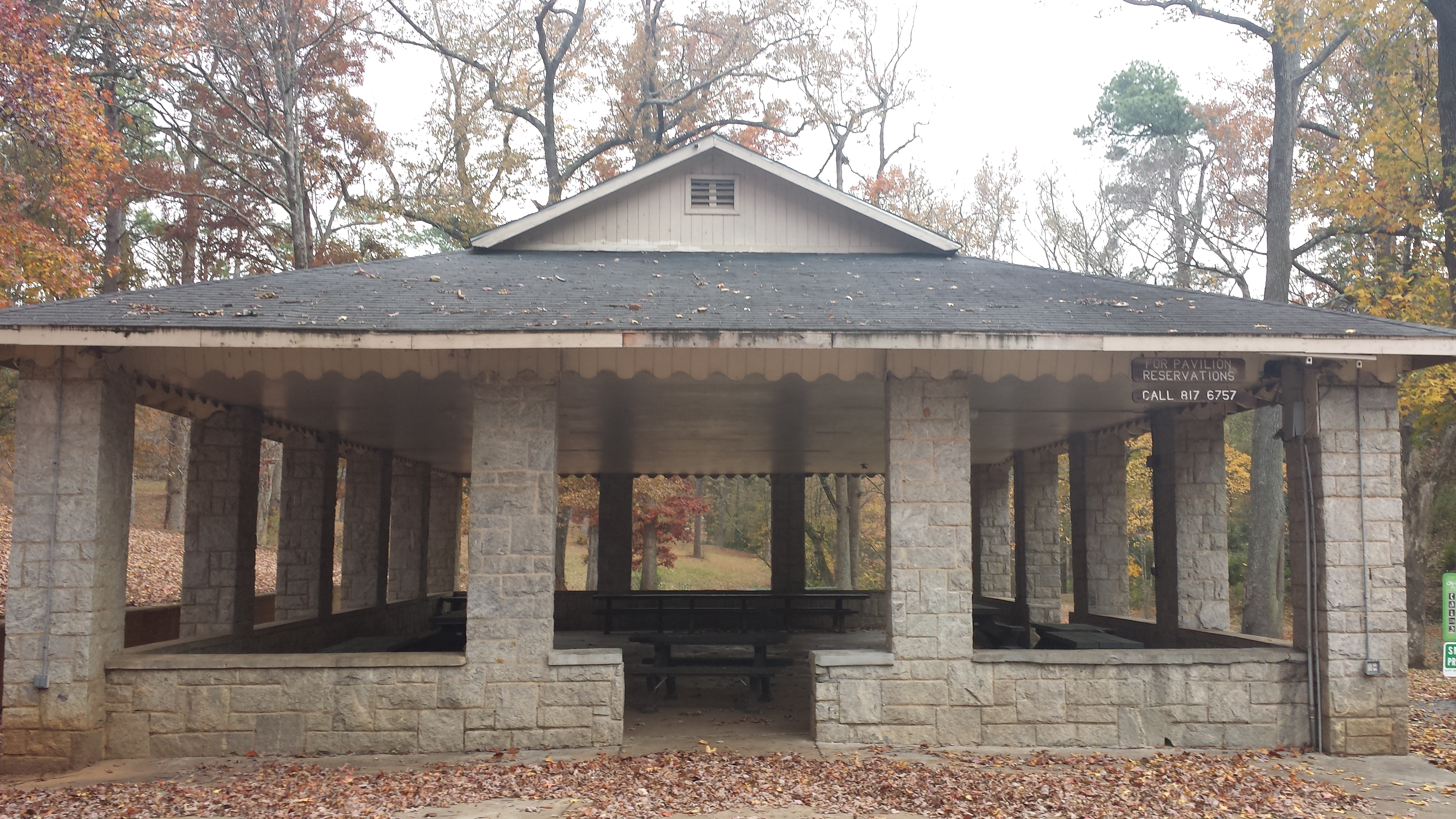

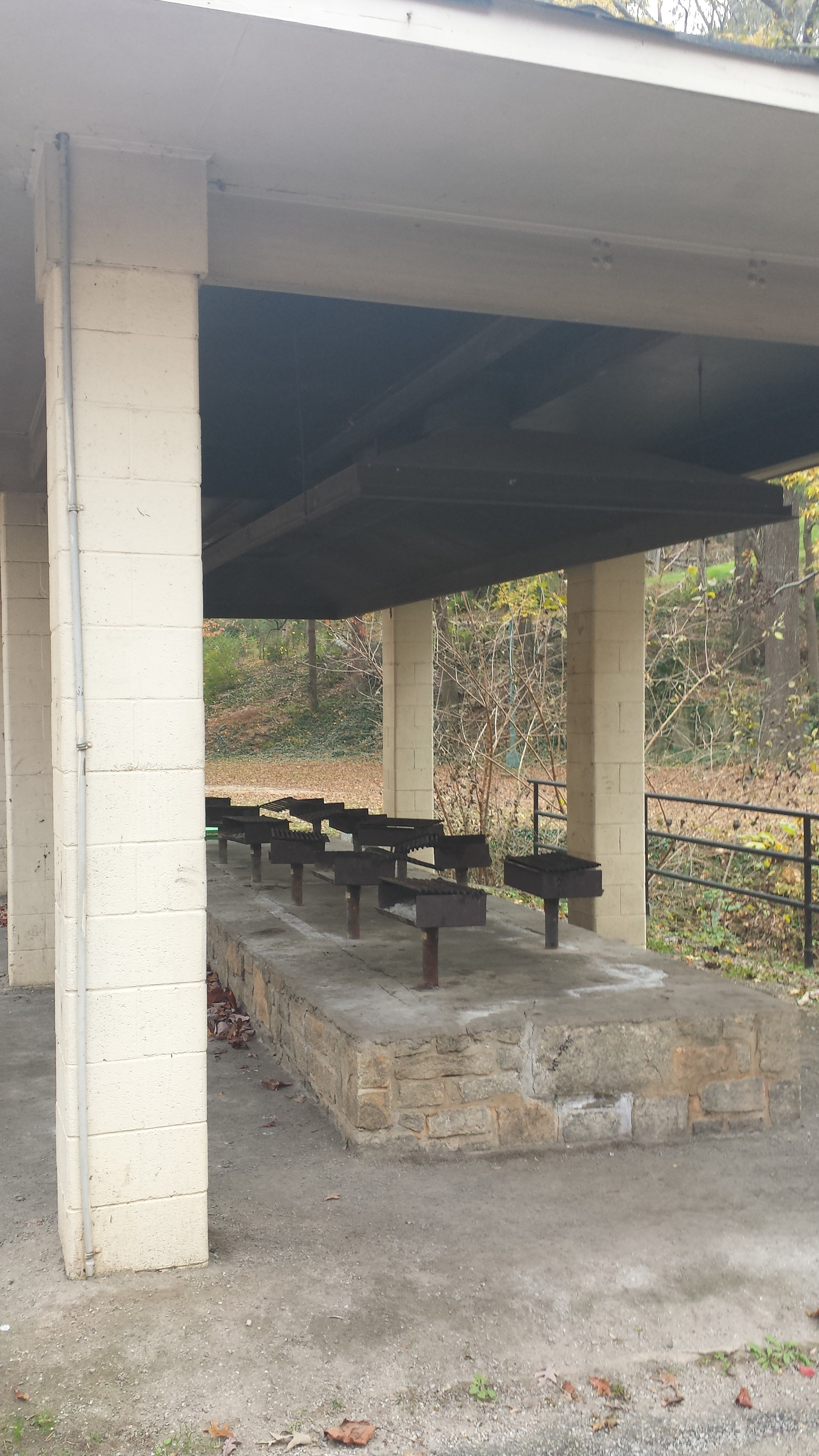

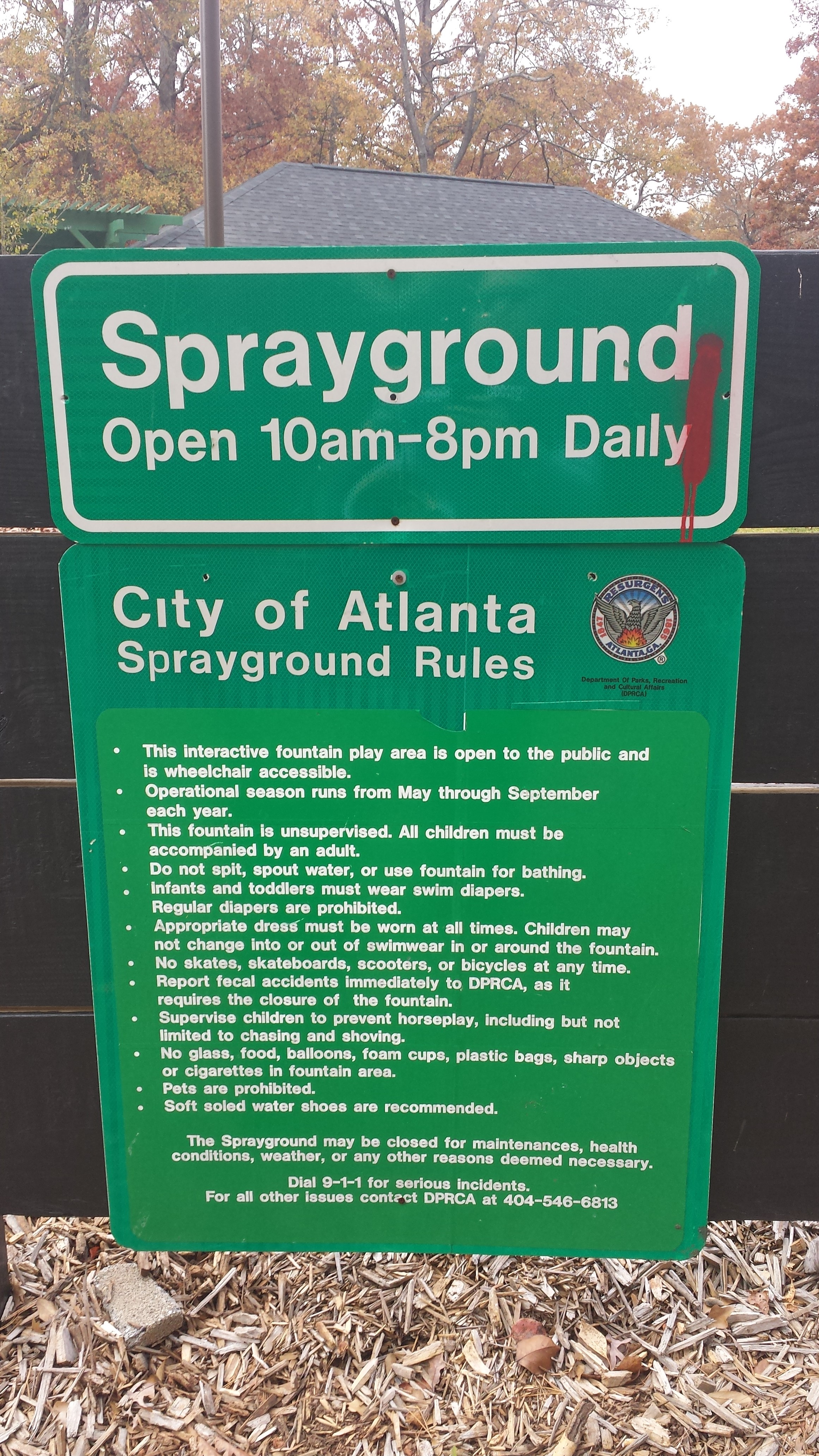

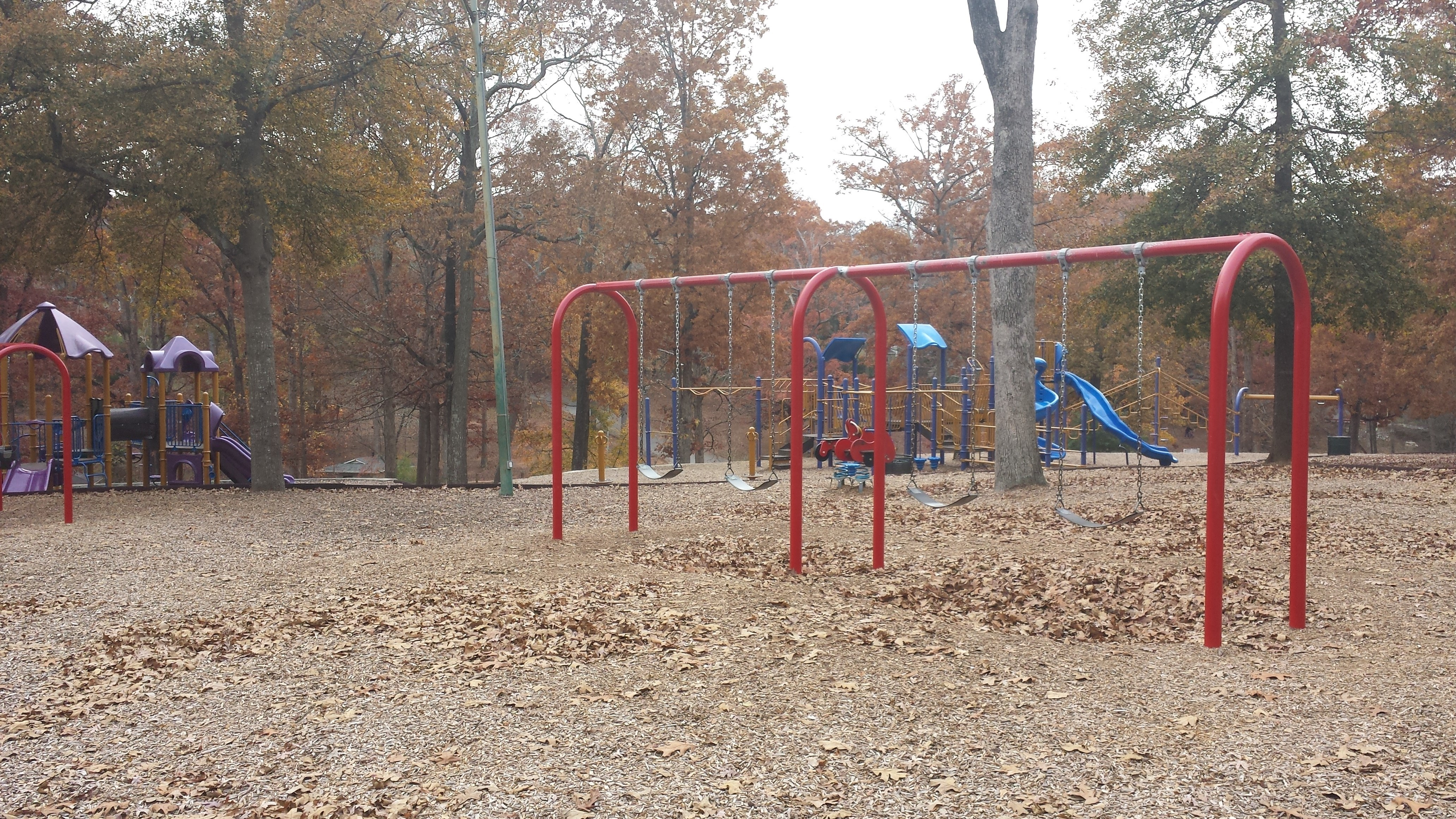

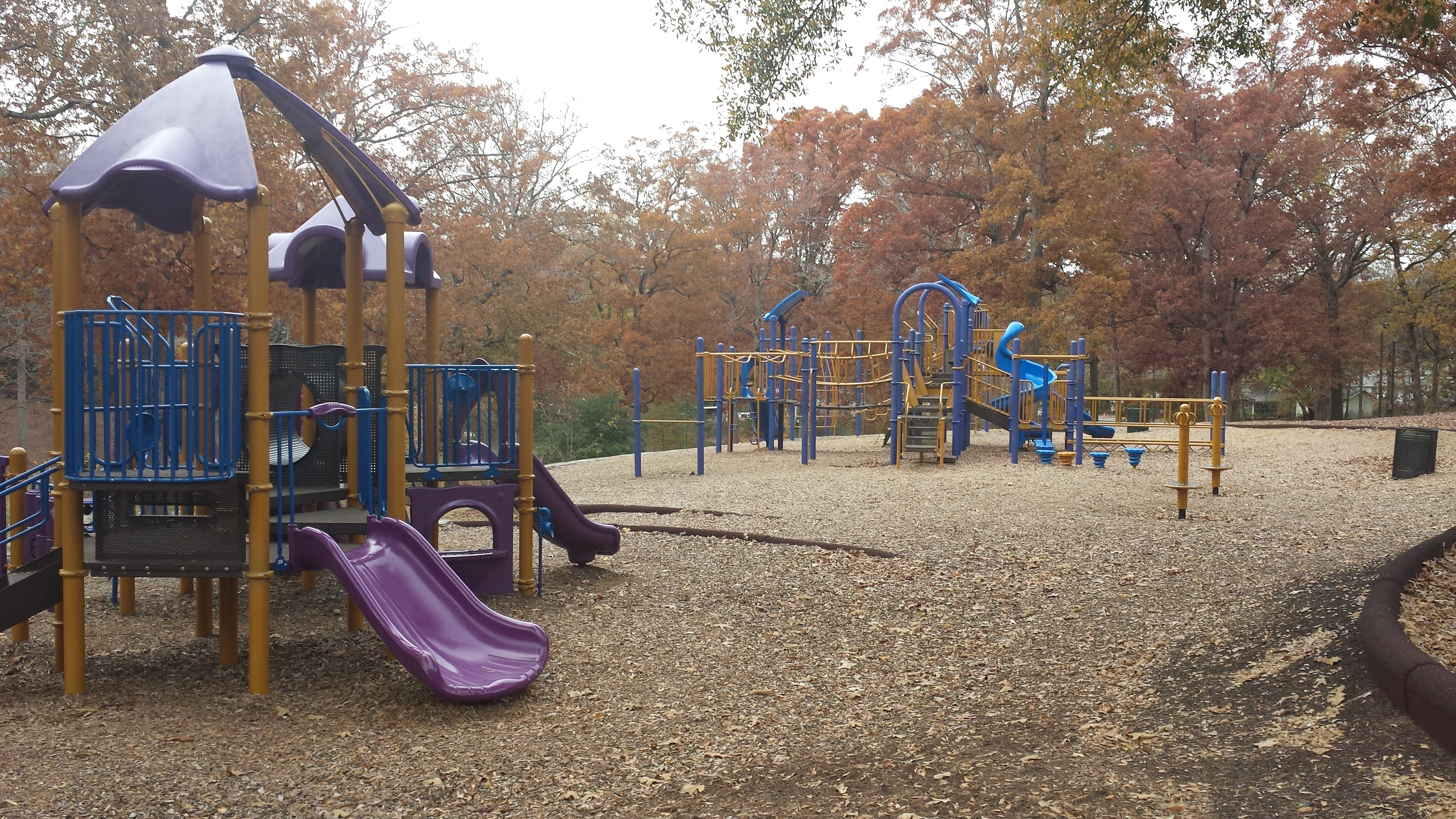

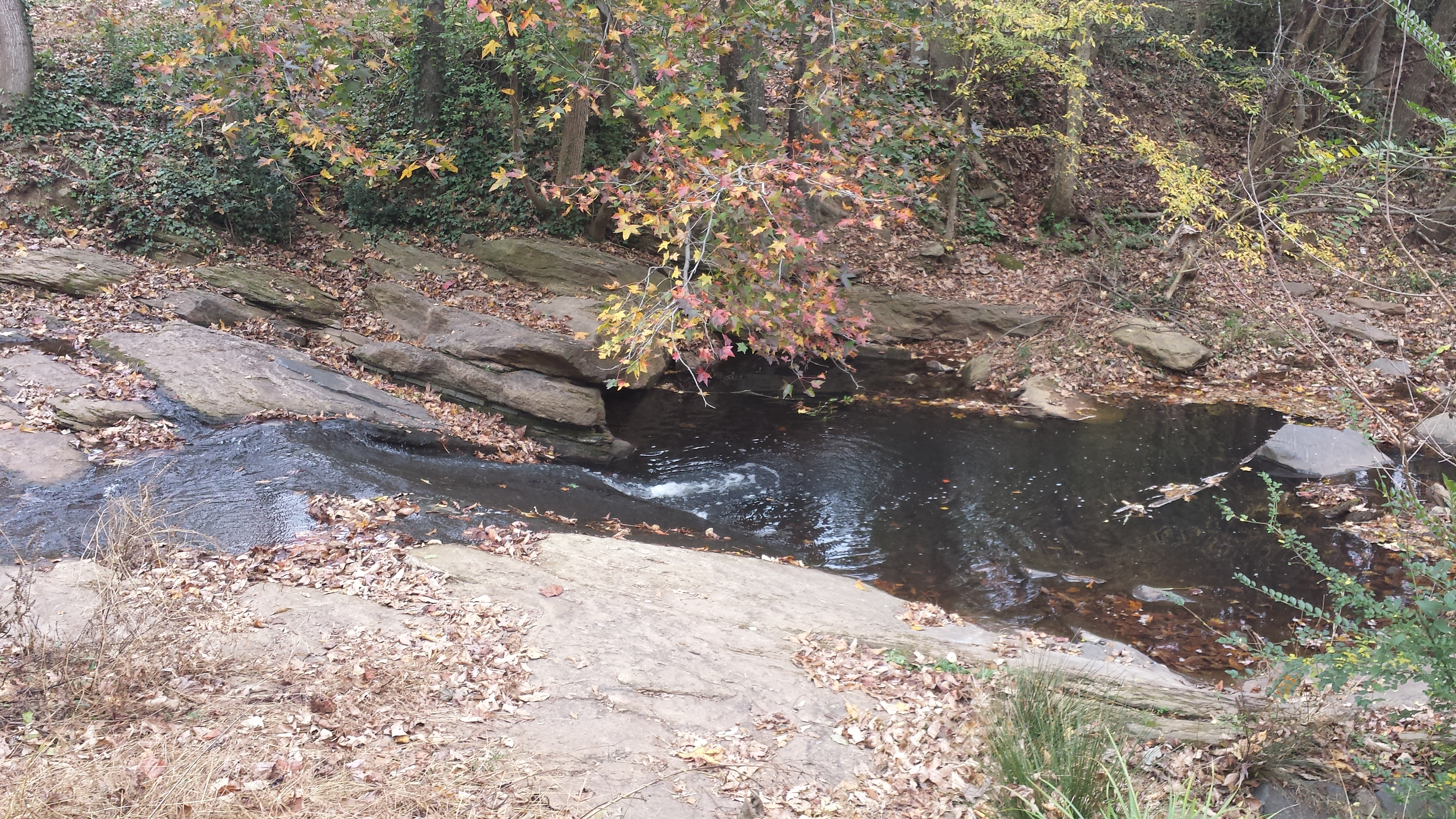
