= Sylvan Hills, Atlanta =

Neighbourhood of Atlanta, Georgia, United States

Coordinates: 33.70521°N 84.41809°W

Sylvan Hills is a historic intown neighborhood in southwest Atlanta, Georgia, United States.

Sylva, Latin for “forest”, describes the mature and dense tree canopy that shades the streets and homes of Sylvan Hills. The majority of homes were built between the 1920s and 1950s.

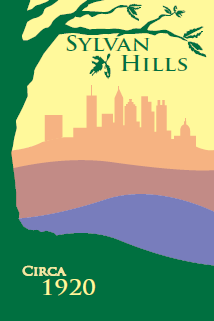
Sylvan Hills Neighborhood Association banner

== History ==
The neighborhood is bordered on the north by Deckner Avenue, on the south by Langford Parkway (Hwy 166), to the east by I-75/85 and on the west by Murphy Avenue.

The area that is now Sylvan Hills was once part of the Perkerson and Gilbert holdings that are believed to date to 1831.

Housing development began in Sylvan Hills about 1920 during post-World War I growth. The housing boom tapered off during the Great Depression and started up again after World War II, lasting until the neighborhood was completely developed.

In April 1922, J.R. Smith & M.S. Rankin published an article in The Atlanta Constitution newspaper about their new subdivision to be developed on 100 acres in southwest Atlanta to be called "Sylvan Hills". The property was located on what was then South Ashby Road (soon to be renamed Sylvan Road). The land was advertised to be nearly as level as a floor and situated in a forest of poplar, oak and hickory. The conveniences they associated with this new subdivision included: proximity to schools and churches, paved streets, paved sidewalks, water and sewer, two nearby trolley lines and its location within the city limits. The subdivision was to have few restrictions, however, those restrictions included the following: "A 25 foot building line [setback] must be maintained; It is to be used exclusively for white people; [and] None of the properties can be used for stores or other commercial purposes." The property was subdivided into 50 x 150 ft lots and prices for these lots ranged from $775 to $1350.

By mid-1923, sales of lots and the building of homes were well underway. Advertisements from that period promoted the Sylvan Hills subdivision as "This splendid tract of gently rolling woodland is most appropriately named because over its entire extent the gracefully undulating knolls are covered with majestic forest trees, shading the hills and vales during the summer season, and furnishing much protection from winter blasts."

In May 1924, H. A. Spencer of Norfolk, Virginia, announced the implementation of a "Cross-Town Bus" system that would run from Morningside to Sylvan Hills. The fare for riding the ten modern motor buses was 10 cents. Spencer is credited as being the originator of the cross-town bus system.

Home Beautiful Show Atlanta

Among the open houses for the 1925 Home Beautiful Show was a house located in Sylvan Hills on Melrose Drive (shown above). The house listed for $7,000 and was built by Wagar & Company.

By July 1925, 135 lots had been sold in Sylvan Hills. The subdivision was touted as: "One of the showplaces of the southside metropolitan section.... just a comfortable distance from industrial centers." Its proximity to the city of Atlanta was also listed as an advantage, being reached easily via Sylvan Road, to Dill Avenue and then along Lee - all of which were paved roads, a huge amenity at the time. Road and infrastructure improvements were being made on Woodbourne Drive, Harte Drive and Mickleberry Street to accommodate the demand for lots.

The Sun Rises in Morningside and Sets in Sylvan Hills

Although the Morningside community became a more popularly known community, the Sylvan Hills and neighboring Capitol View Manor neighborhoods shared a few common ties. In 1926, the real estate agency of Maddox & Tisinger sold properties in all three neighborhoods. Additionally, prominent developer James Jackson built many homes in Morningside and Sylvan Hills. Jackson's homes were known for their superior craftsmanship and intricate use of modern materials.

Sylvan Hills also featured homes constructed by respected developer R. M. Cole. The promotional article for Cole published in 1925 talks about how his houses were the prettiest in Sylvan Hills. Cole shared with developer James Jackson a similar emphasis on the use of premium materials and highly skilled workmanship, attracting homeowners in search of more affluent amenities.

By mid-1927, the Sylvan Hills Improvement Club had been established and met on Deckner Avenue. One of the priority projects for the club was to secure land for a park to serve the residents of the growing Sylvan Hills subdivision. The property that was secured belonged to the Perkerson family and comprised 370 acres. At the time, only two buildings existed on the property that were deemed of importance—the Perkerson home and a Fulton county school. The property was soon purchased and developed into a city park, with the contingency that the Perkerson home remain in ownership of the family during the remainder of their lives. City notables in favor of the project included: Mayor James L. Key, Alderman Charles M. Ford, Judge T.O. Hathcock, Frank Callaway, T.B. Hopkins, and T.H. Goodwin.

At one time, there was a center of shops, including a movie theater, at Dill Avenue and Sylvan Road. Shops along the railroad tracks attracted personnel from nearby Fort McPherson.

== Revitalization ==
After decades of decline, Sylvan Hills has experienced significant revitalization and increased demand, diversity, and property values since the 2010s, driven primarily by its proximity to Tyler Perry Studios, Downtown, Midtown, Hartsfield–Jackson Atlanta International Airport, Atlanta colleges and universities, and the Beltline. Sylvan Hills is an official Beltline neighborhood which positively impacted the neighborhood's appeal.

== Places of interest ==
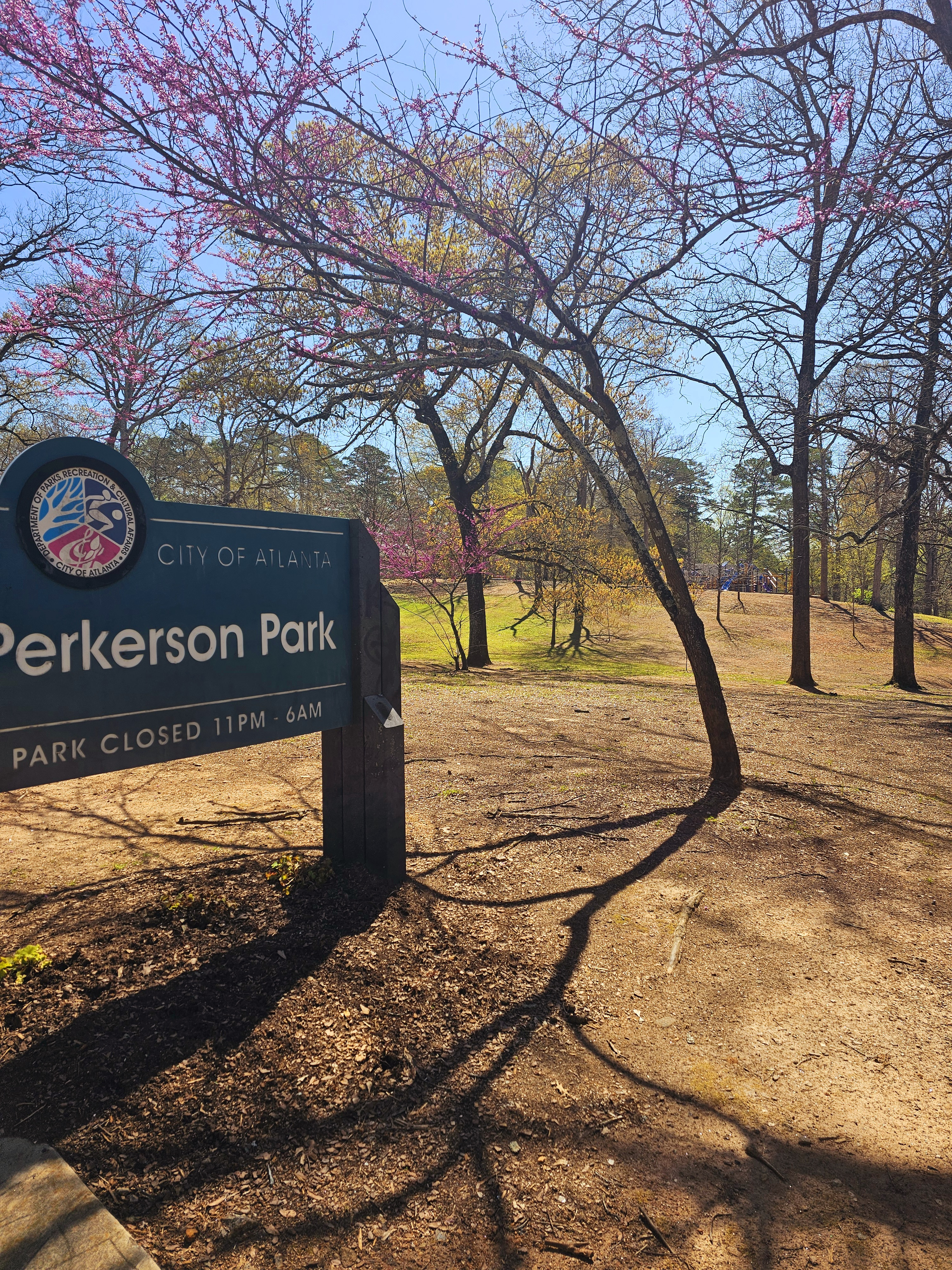
Perkerson Park in early spring

=== Perkerson Park ===
Perkerson Park is approximately 50 acres in size and is located in the northeast portion of the neighborhood. The park is shared with the nearby Capitol View neighborhood.

=== Crossroads Shopping Center ===
The Crossroads Shopping Center, better known by its former name, the Stewart-Lakewood Center, is located in Sylvan Hills. It houses several national and local businesses.

=== Sylvan Plaza ===
The shopping center off Sylvan Rd is home to mostly local businesses.

=== Easterseals North Georgia ===
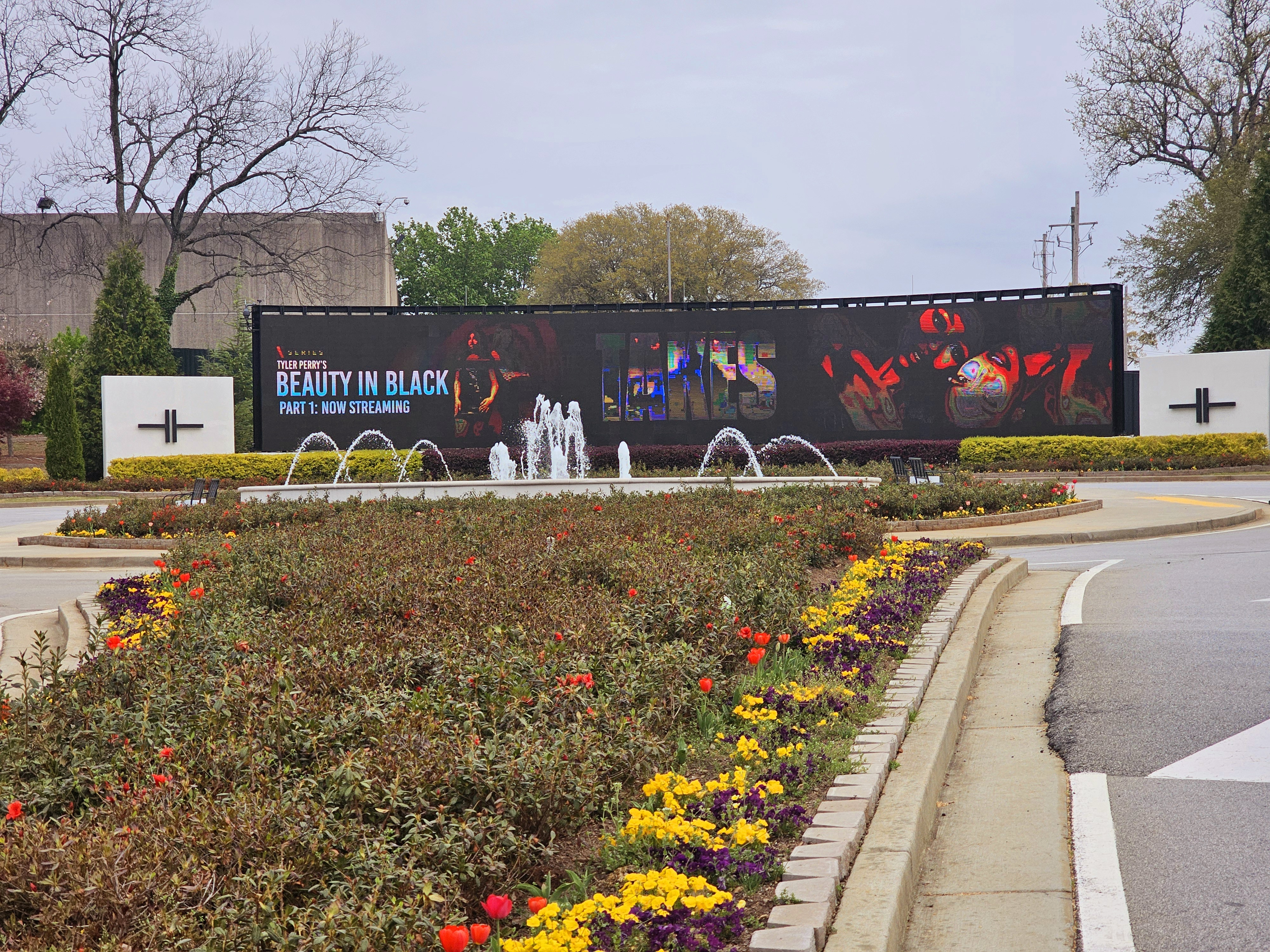
Tyler Perry Studios entrance

Easterseals is a grassroots community-based nonprofit that provides services to help children with disabilities and/or special needs as well as support to their families.

=== Tyler Perry Studios / Fort McPherson ===
Fort McPherson, colloquially known as "Fort Mac" is a U.S. military installation situated just west of Murphy Street, walking distance from the western border of the Sylvan Hills neighborhood. In 2015, billionaire entertainment mogul Tyler Perry purchased the majority of Fort McPherson's 500 acre property for the new home of Tyler Perry Studios which opened in 2019.

== Lakewood/Fort McPherson MARTA Station layout ==
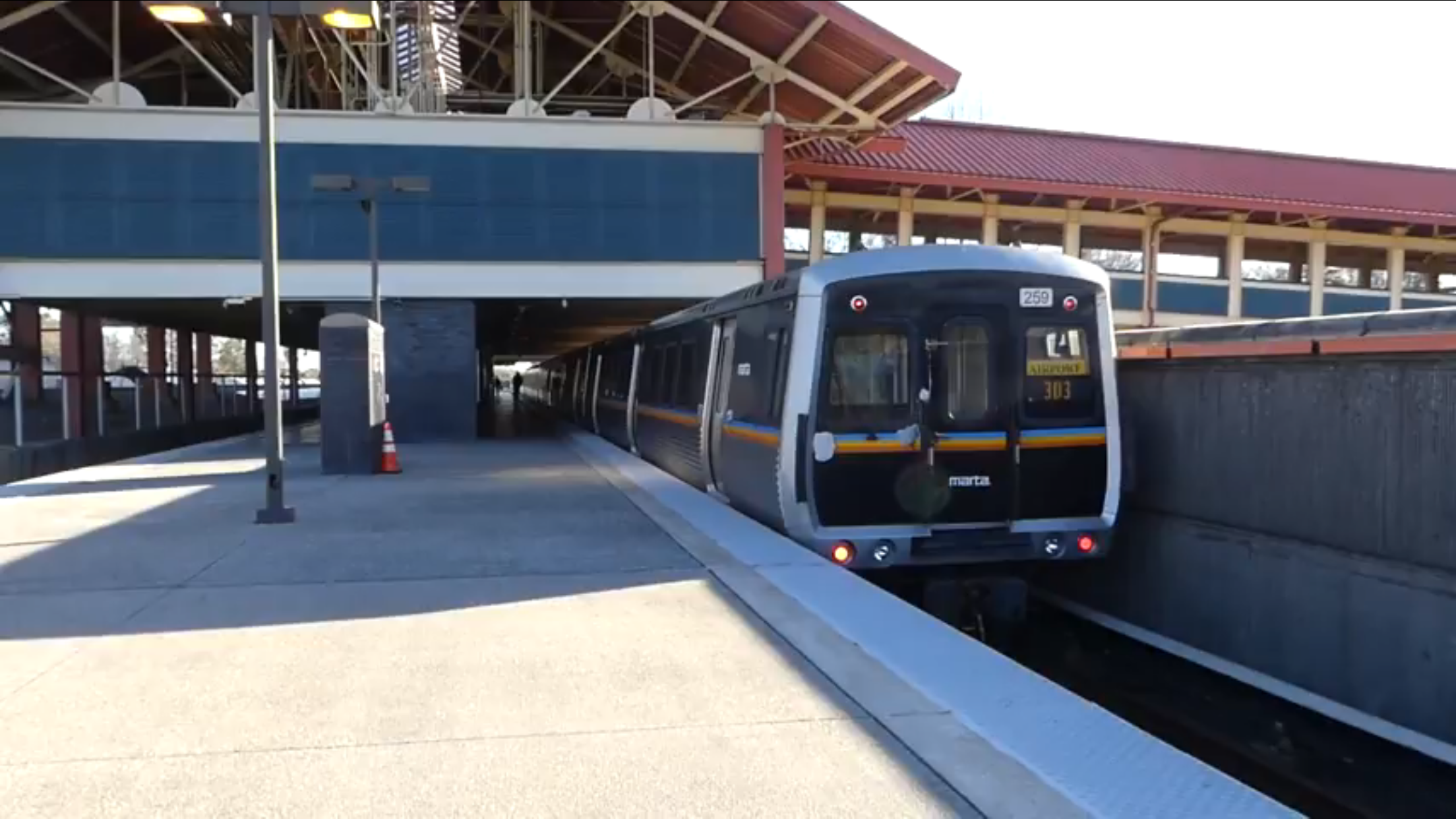
Lakewood/Fort McPherson MARTA station

M	Mezzanine	Crossover to platform
P Platform level	Southbound	← Red Line, Gold Line toward Airport (East Point)
P Platform level	Island platform, doors will open on the left
P Platform level	Northbound	Gold Line toward Doraville (Oakland City) → Red Line toward North Springs (Oakland City) →
G	Street Level	Entrance/Exit, fare barriers, bus loops

== Neighborhood Association ==
The official neighborhood association is the Sylvan Hills Neighborhood Association (SHNA) which strives to represent the best interests of property owners, business owners, and residents in Sylvan Hills. SHNA meets every 4th Thursday evening between January and October.

== Schools ==
Atlanta Public Schools located within Sylvan Hills

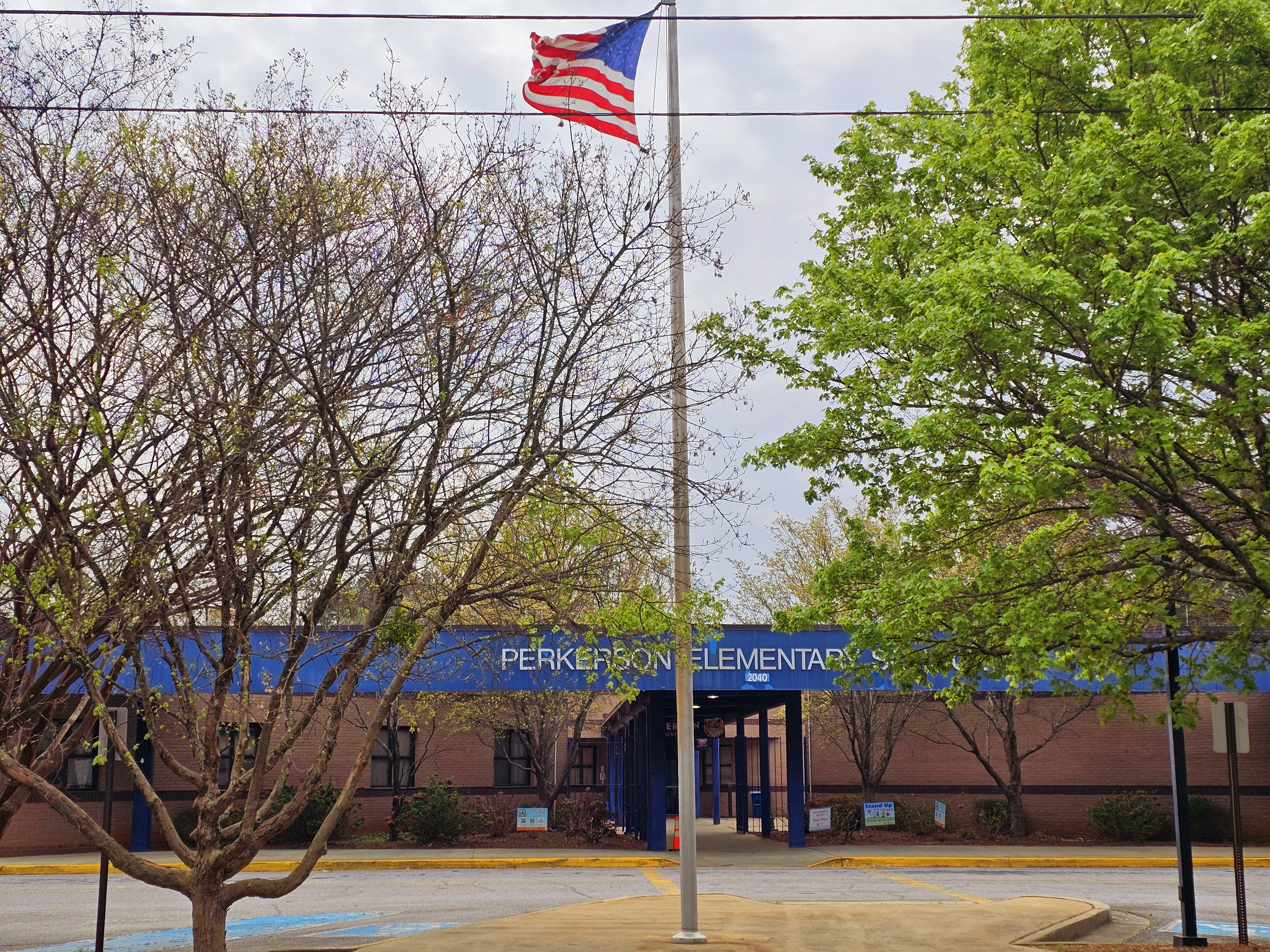
Perkerson Elementary School

=== Elementary ===
Perkerson Elementary School
2040 Brewer Blvd SW
Atlanta, GA 30310

=== Middle ===
Sylvan Hills Middle School
1461 Sylvan Rd SW
Atlanta, GA 30310
