= Metropolitan Parkway (Atlanta) =

Road in Atlanta, Georgia, US

Metropolitan Parkway (formerly known as Stewart Avenue) is a major thoroughfare through southwestern Atlanta, Georgia, United States. It is signed throughout as US 19/US 41/SR 3.

== Route description ==
Once Metropolitan Parkway reaches Whitehall Street (the southern portion of Peachtree Street), the parkway turns into Northside Drive northward to Marietta.

Once it reaches Hapeville, it is called Dogwood Drive, and it ends at Central Avenue. US 19/US 41/SR 3 continues east down Central Avenue.

Landmarks along the street include Atlanta Metropolitan College, the Stewart-Lakewood shopping center, and the Capitol View Baptist Church.

== History ==
Metropolitan Parkway was once known as "Stewart Avenue", after one of the street's first inhabitants Andrew P. Stewart. The name was changed in 1997 because of the area's red-light district and crime reputation. Despite the name change and major improvements since the 1990s, crime still remains a concern in the area, especially at night.

== Gallery ==
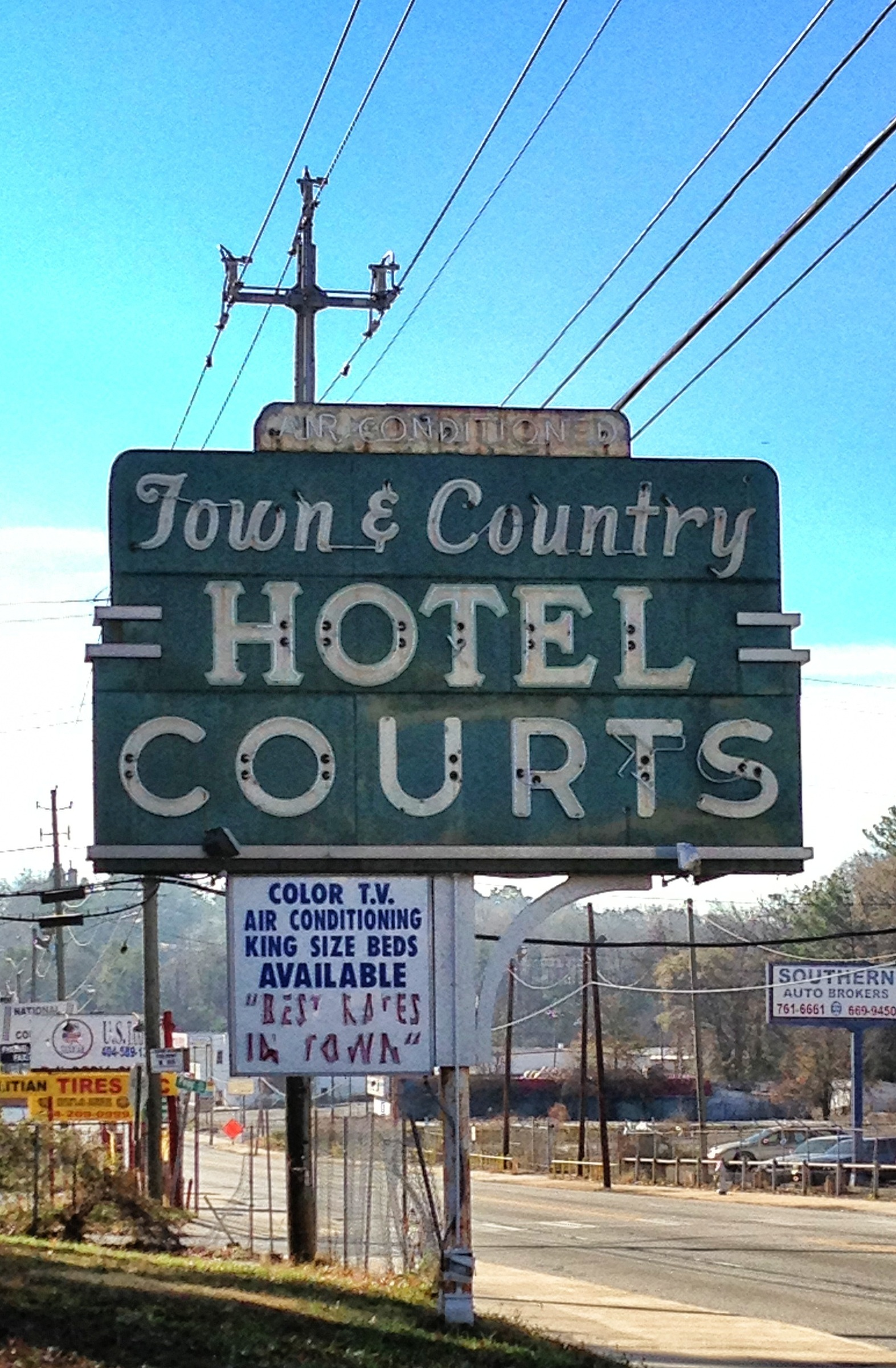
Town and Country Hotel Courts, Metropolitan Parkway, Perkerson neighborhood, Atlanta

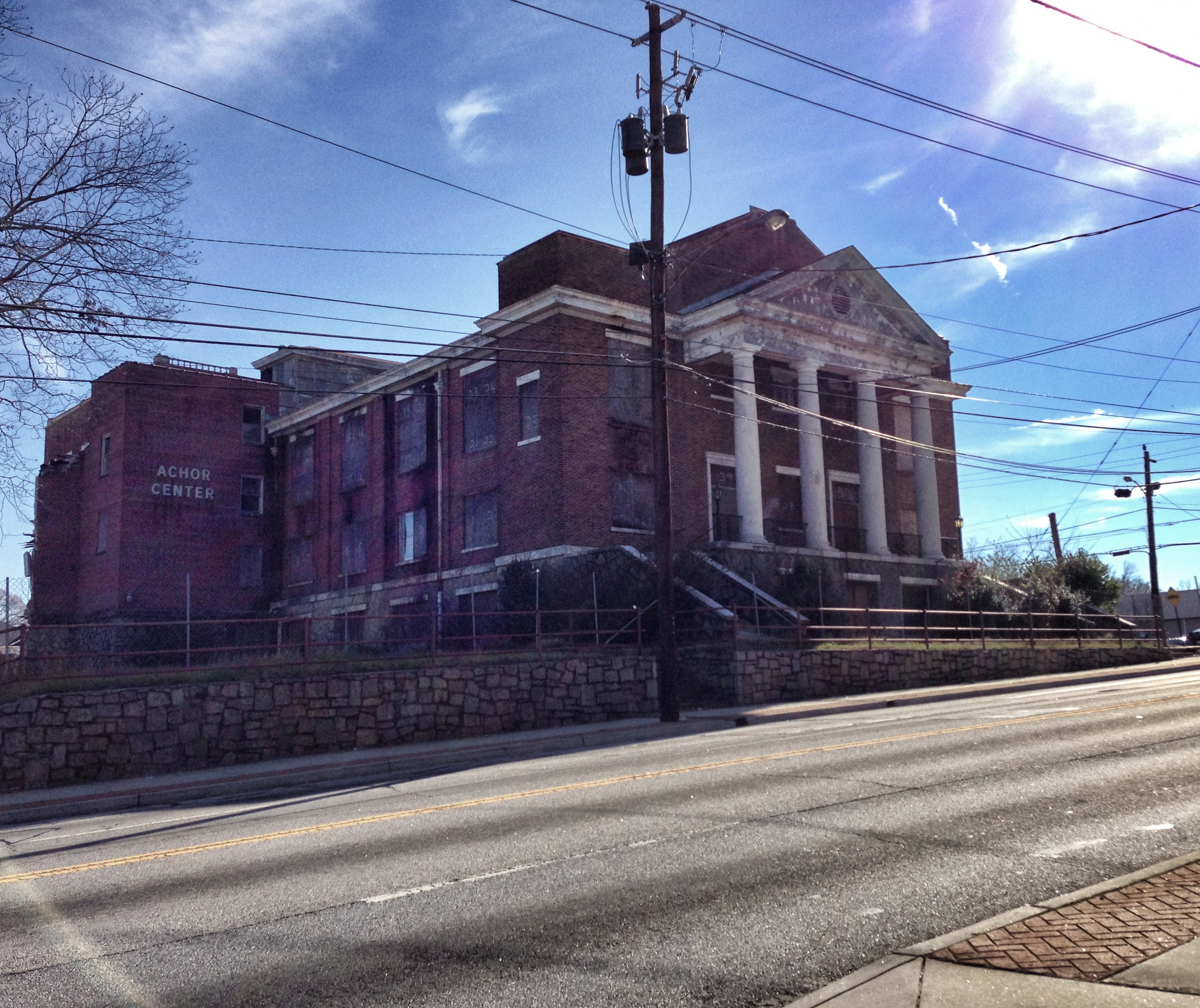
Former Capitol View Baptist Church on Metropolitan Parkway, Capitol View Manor neighborhood, Atlanta]

== See also ==
- Transportation in Atlanta
- List of former Atlanta street names
