= List of public art in Atlanta =

This is a list of public art in Atlanta, in the United States. This list applies only to works of public art on permanent display in an outdoor public space. For example, this does not include artworks in museums. Public art may include sculptures, statues, monuments, memorials, murals, and mosaics.

Image	Title / subject	Location and coordinates	Date	Artist / designer	Type	Material	Dimensions	Designation	Owner / administrator	Wikidata	Notes
	Adult Swim mural	Along Williams Street, near Williams Street headquarters 33.7829°N 84.3904°W			Mural						
More images	Air France Flight 007 Memorial	Grounds of the High Museum of Art 33.7898°N 84.3849°W			Memorial				High Museum of Art		Memorial for the Air France Flight 007 disaster. Incorporates a replica of The Shade by Auguste Rodin, which was gifted by the government of France to Atlanta following the disaster.
	Albert Einstein Memorial	Main campus of the Georgia Institute of Technology 33.775064°N 84.397864°W	2015	Robert Berks	Statue	Bronze			Georgia Tech	Q2402570	Replica of the original in Washington, D.C.
More images	Atlanta from the Ashes (The Phoenix)	Woodruff Park 33°45′16.72″N 84°23′21.37″W	1969	James Siegler	Sculpture	Bronze				Q4816193	
	Auburn Avenue bas-reliefs	Along Auburn Avenue	1996	Brian Owens	Bas-relief	Bronze, Granite					Four bas-reliefs honoring notable individuals from the Sweet Auburn neighborhood. The four individuals honored are Alice Dugged Cary, Carrie Steele Logan, Wesley Chapel Redding, and James Tate.
	Autoeater	Intersection of Peachtree Street and 10th Street 33°46′54.5″N 84°23′2″W	2017	Julia Venske; Gregor Spänle	Sculpture	Carrera marble	Weight: 32,000 pounds (15,000 kg)		Midtown Alliance	Q99539189	
	Ballet Olympia	Near SunTrust Plaza 33.7626°N 84.3870°W	1992	John C. Portman Jr.	Sculpture						Adapted from a sculpture by Paul Manship.
	Statue of Barbara Asher	Intersection of Marietta Street and Broad Street 33.7549°N 84.3906°W	1998		Statue	Bronze					
	Behold	Near Ebenezer Baptist Church 33.755647°N 84.373885°W	1990	Patrick Morelli	Statue	Bronze					
	Statue of Bobby Dodd	Main campus of the Georgia Institute of Technology 33.7737°N 84.3933°W	2012		Statue				Georgia Tech		
	The Bridge	John Lewis Plaza in Freedom Park 33.7734°N 84.3594°W	1997	Thornton Dial	Sculpture	Steel					
More images	Carnegie Education Pavilion	Hardy Ivy Park 33.762633°N 84.387533°W	1997		Monument					Q5043886	
	Concord	Near SunTrust Plaza 33.762980°N 84.386158°W	1992	John C. Portman Jr.	Sculpture	Bronze					
More images	Confederate Obelisk	Confederate section of Oakland Cemetery 33.747985°N 84.372079°W	1874		Obelisk	Granite	Height: 65 feet (20 m)			Q100148300	
	Continuing the Conversation	Main campus of the Georgia Institute of Technology 33.7729°N 84.3950°W	2018	Martin Dawe	Statue	Granite; Bronze			Georgia Tech	Q97609953	
	Statue of Dominique Wilkins	State Farm Arena 33°45′23.5″N 84°23′46″W	2015	Brian Hanlon	Statue	Granite; Bronze					
More images	Statue of Elizabeth and Joseph E. Brown	Grounds of the Georgia State Capitol 33°44′56.5″N 84°23′20.5″W	1928	Giuseppe Moretti	Statue	Bronze					
	Statue of Ellis Arnall	Grounds of the Georgia State Capitol 33°44′57″N 84°23′19″W	1997	Zenos Frudakis	Statue					Q98549574	
	Erskine Memorial Fountain	Grant Park 33°43′53″N 84°22′24″W	1896	J. Massey Rhind	Fountain					Q96377382	
More images	Statue of Eugene Talmadge	Grounds of the Georgia State Capitol 33°44′54″N 84°23′17″W	1949	Steffen Thomas	Statue					Q98175534	
	Statue of Evander Holyfield			Brian Hanlon	Statue						Statue initially was planned to be installed in front of the Flatiron Building near Woodruff Park in 2018. However, this location was later dropped, and the complete statue is currently in storage, awaiting installation somewhere in Southwest Atlanta.
	Expelled Because of Color	Grounds of the Georgia State Capitol 33.748966°N 84.387681°W	1978	John T. Riddle	Sculpture					Q57157852	
	Five Points Monument	Five Points 33.754418°N 84.389849°W	1996	George Beasley	Sculpture	Bronze; Steel				Q100325695	
	The Flair	Georgia International Plaza 33.7572°N 84.3985°W	1996	Richard MacDonald	Statue	Bronze				Q7734329	
	Free Nelson Mandela	Piedmont Park 33.7824°N 84.3726°W	1987	David Hammons	Sculpture					Q5499937	
	Freedom of Flight	Hardy Ivy Park 33.763212°N 84.387499°W	2014	Corrina Sephora	Sculpture						
	Gateway of Dreams	Centennial Olympic Park 33.760407°N 84.393564°W	1996	Raymond Kaskey	Monument					Q100249783	
More images	Statue of George C. Griffin	Main campus of the Georgia Institute of Technology 33.774638°N 84.399342°W			Statue	Bronze			Georgia Tech		Located near the Ferst Center for the Arts.
	Mural on the Glenn Building	Glenn Building 33.756983°N 84.392969°W	2016	Alexi Torres	Mural		Height: 47 feet (14 m); Width: 37 feet (11 m)		Glenn Building		
More images	Statue of Henry W. Grady	Intersection of Marietta Street and Forsyth Street 33°45′20.2788″N 84°23′28.662″W	1891	Alexander Doyle	Statue					Q94523331	
	Statue of Herman Talmadge	Talmadge Plaza 33.749221°N 84.389362°W	1990		Statue						
	Homage to King	Intersection of Freedom Parkway and Boulevard 33.759930°N 84.372468°W	1996	Xavier Medina Campeny	Sculpture	Steel				Q5887398	
	Hope Moving Forward	Martin Luther King Jr. Drive 33.754593°N 84.404168°W		Basil Watson	Statue						
More images	International Peace Fountain	Woodruff Park 33.756°N 84.388°W	1995	Nimrod Long & Associates	Fountain						
	Iron Column	Eastside Trail near the Historic Fourth Ward Skatepark 33.766042°N 84.360088°W	2013	Phil Proctor	Sculpture	Iron					
	Statue of Jimmy Carter	Grounds of the Georgia State Capitol 33.7494°N 84.3883°W	1994	Frederick Hart	Statue	Bronze					
More images	Statue of John Brown Gordon	Grounds of the Georgia State Capitol 33°44′59″N 84°23′18″W	1907	Solon Borglum; Alexander Campbell Bruce	Statue	Bronze				Q96384517	
More images	Statue of John Heisman	Main campus of the Georgia Institute of Technology 33.7736°N 84.3927°W			Statue				Georgia Tech		
	Mural of John Lewis	Intersection of Auburn Avenue and Jessie Hill Jr. Drive 33.7553°N 84.3805°W	2012		Mural		Height:65 feet (20 m)				
	Statue of John Stith Pemberton	Pemberton Place 33.7627°N 84.3935°W	2007	Russ Faxon	Statue	Bronze					
More images	Statue of Joseph E. Brown and Elizabeth Brown	Grounds of the Georgia State Capitol 33.748957°N 84.388999°W	1928		Statue						
	Kaath	Intersection of Eastside Trail and Highland Avenue 33.761439°N 84.361446°W	2018	JD Koth	Sculpture						
More images	Kessler Campanile	Main campus of the Georgia Institute of Technology 33°46′27″N 84°23′54″W	1996	Richard Hill	Campanile		Height: 80 feet (24 m)		Georgia Tech	Q6395158	
	The Last Meter	Piedmont Park 33.786596°N 84.377745°W	1996	Eino	Sculpture	Bronze					Commissioned by Asics and PowerBar for the Centennial Olympic Games. Depicts a scene from the 5000 metres at the 1976 Summer Olympics.
	Lifting the Veil of Ignorance	Booker T. Washington High School 33.753574°N 84.420185°W	1927	Charles Keck	Statue	Bronze and Marble					Replica of the original statue at the Tuskegee University.
More images	Lion of the Confederacy	Confederate section of Oakland Cemetery 33.7482°N 84.3716°W	1894	T. M. Brady	Sculpture	Marble					Based on the Lion Monument in Lucerne, Switzerland.
	Statue of Martin Luther King Jr.	Grounds of the Georgia State Capitol 33°44′57″N 84°23′15″W	2017	Martin Dawe	Statue	Bronze	Height: 8 feet (2.4 m)			Q97275664	
More images	Millennium Gate	Atlantic Station 33.79107°N 84.39975°W	2008		Triumphal arch					Q1090799	
	Miss Freedom	On top of the Georgia State Capitol 33°44′56.35″N 84°23′17.33″W				Copper				Q6876691	
	Nike	Grounds of the Atlanta City Hall 33.7492°N 84.3904°W	1996	Pavlos Angelos Kougioumtzis	Sculpture	Bronze	Height: 11 feet (3.4 m)				Sculpture awarded to host city of the Summer Olympic Games since 1996.
	Northern White	Intersection of Eastside Trail and Freedom Parkway 33.764061°N 84.359557°W	2012	David Landis	Sculpture	Stainless steel					
More images	Peace Monument	Piedmont Park 33°47′11″N 84°22′39″W	1911	Allen George Newman	Statue					Q98136875	
More images	Pioneer Women	Piedmont Park 33.786794°N 84.377410°W	1938	Steffen Thomas	Sculpture	Granite; Bronze					
	Police memorial	Woodruff Park 33.755704°N 84.388684°W	1980	Steve Steinman	Memorial						Also known as Give Our Police a Hand. Dedicated by the bar association of Atlanta during the Atlanta murders of 1979–1981.
More images	Statue of Richard Russell Jr.	Grounds of the Georgia State Capitol 33.749189°N 84.388855°W	1975		Statue						
More images	Statue of Samuel Spencer	1200 Peachtree Street 33.787858°N 84.383959°W	1910	Henry Bacon; Daniel Chester French; Piccirilli Brothers	Statue					Q98526767	
More images	Sidney Lanier Monument	Piedmont Park 33.786018°N 84.375032°W	1914	Carrère and Hastings; Edward Clark Potter	Monument						
	This is Something That I Had To Go Through	Intersection of Eastside Trail and Highland Avenue 33.761014°N 84.362217°W	2018	James Davis	Sculpture						
More images	Statue of Thomas E. Watson	Talmadge Plaza 33°44′58″N 84°23′22″W	1932	Joseph Klein	Statue		Height: 12 feet (3.7 m)			Q98549578	
More images	Thomas W. Talbot Monument	Grant Park 33°44′4″N 84°22′19″W	1948		Monument	Tennessee marble Bronze					
	The Three Pioneers	Main campus of the Georgia Institute of Technology 33.773020°N 84.395420°W	2019	Martin Dawe	Statue	Bronze			Georgia Tech	Q97657209	Part of the Trailblazers series, along with The First Graduate statue.
	Through His Eyes	John Wesley Dobbs Plaza 33.7554°N 84.3778°W	1996	Ralph Helmick	Sculpture	Bronze					Sculpture in honor of John Wesley Dobbs.
More images	Trilon	Intersection of Peachtree Street and 15th Street 33.7883°N 84.3836°W	1975	Steffen Thomas	Sculpture						Sculpture installed in 1975 in a fountain constructed in 1916.
	World Athletes Monument	Pershing Point Park 33.794900°N 84.387938°W	1996		Monument					Q8035381	
	World Events	Grounds of the High Museum of Art 33.788667°N 84.384815°W	1996	Tony Cragg	Sculpture	Aluminum			High Museum of Art		
More images	World War I memorial	Pershing Point Park 33.793662°N 84.387472°W	1920		Memorial						
