= Parks in Atlanta =

Parkland in Atlanta, Georgia in the United States

Atlanta, Georgia includes over 3,000 acres of parkland managed by Parks and Recreation. The 343 Atlanta parks range in scope from formal gardens at Atlanta Botanical Garden to pocket parks in neighborhoods. There are six miles of paved pedestrian and bike trails in the BeltLine, as well as the PATH Foundation network of 150 miles of off-road trails.

== Piedmont Park ==
Piedmont Park, site of the 1895 Cotton States Expo, is Atlanta's iconic green space. The Midtown park, which underwent a major renovation and expansion in 2010, attracts visitors from across the region and hosts various cultural events throughout the year. Piedmont Park also features a large 3-acre dog park with sections for large and small dogs.

== Downtown parks ==
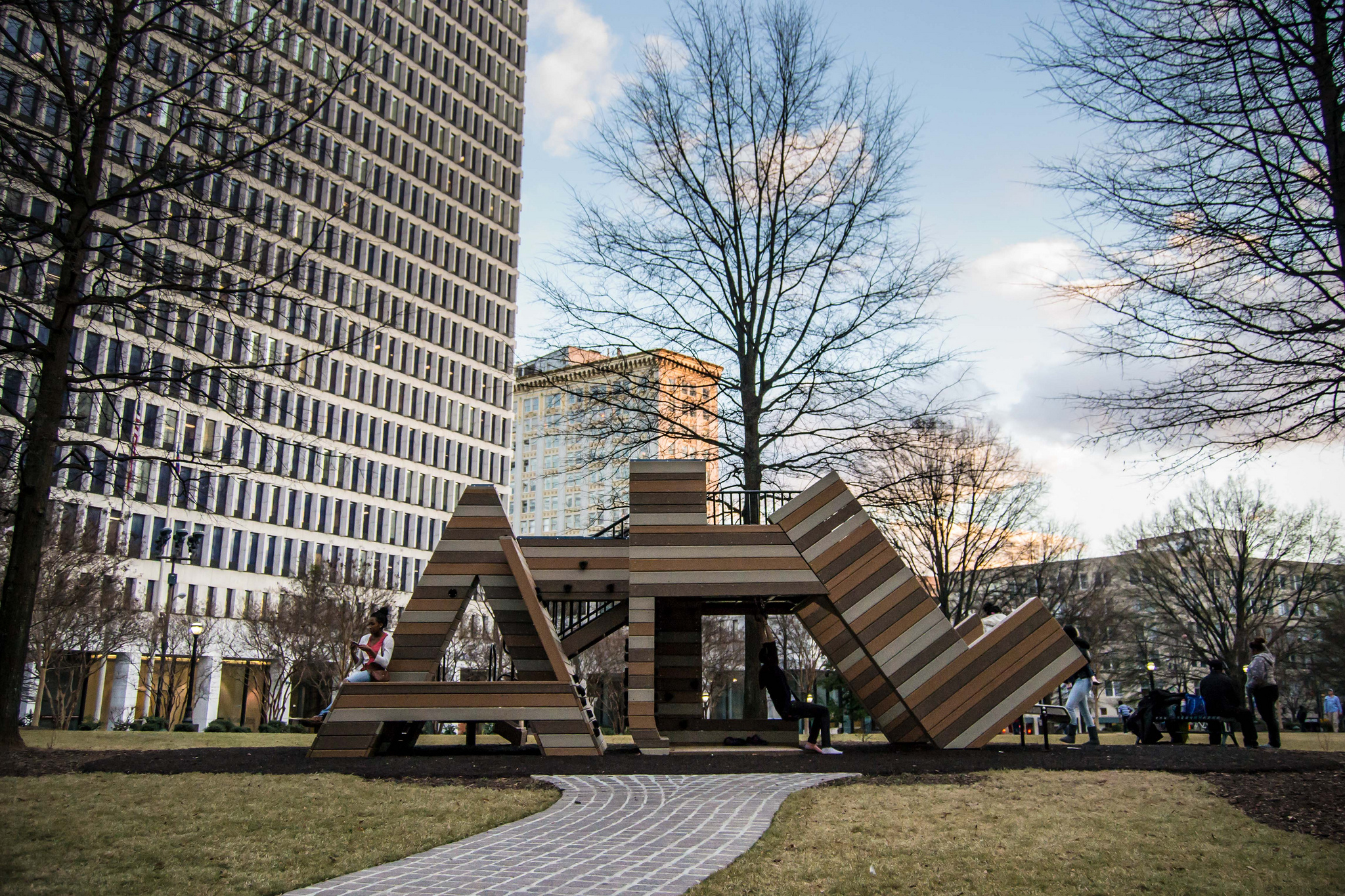
Playground spelling "ATL" in Woodruff Park

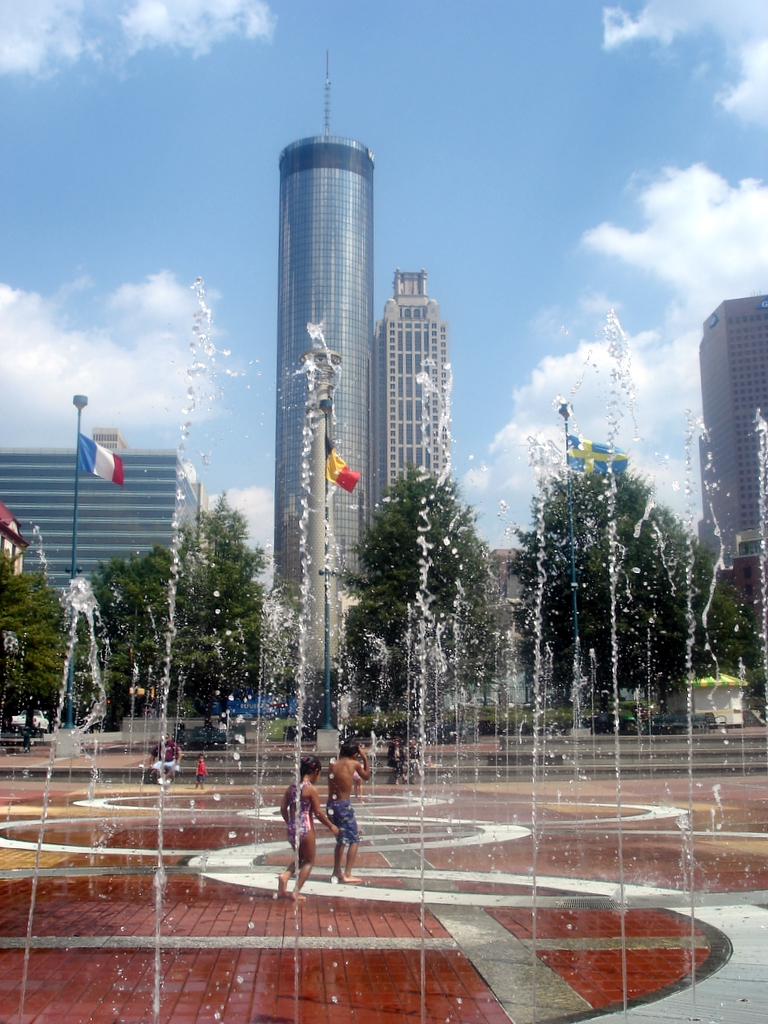
Centennial Olympic Park, Fountain of Rings

Centennial Olympic Park forms a centerpoint for downtown visitors in and around which key visitor attractions are located: nearby Woodruff Park, Georgia International Plaza, and Hurt Park cater to the downtown lunch crowd.

== Other prominent parks ==
Grant Park, located on the east side, is home to the city zoo. Chastain Park, the primary recreational center for the northern Buckhead district, contains an amphitheater for live music concerts. Atlanta's largest park, Shirley Clarke Franklin Park, was constructed on the site of a former gravel quarry and is connected by the Beltline. Before it was built, the Southside Park was the largest park in Atlanta. Perkerson Park in Southwest Atlanta is home to the city's only permanent disc golf course.

Atlanta's neighborhoods are dotted with hundreds of neighborhood parks, such as John Howell Park in Virginia-Highland, and Perkerson Park in the Capitol View/Sylvan Hills area.

Freedom Park is Atlanta's largest passive park, with over 200 acres of linear green space going through Atlanta's historic east side neighborhoods. It was designated as Atlanta's Public Art Park by the Atlanta City Council in 2007.

== Nature preserves ==
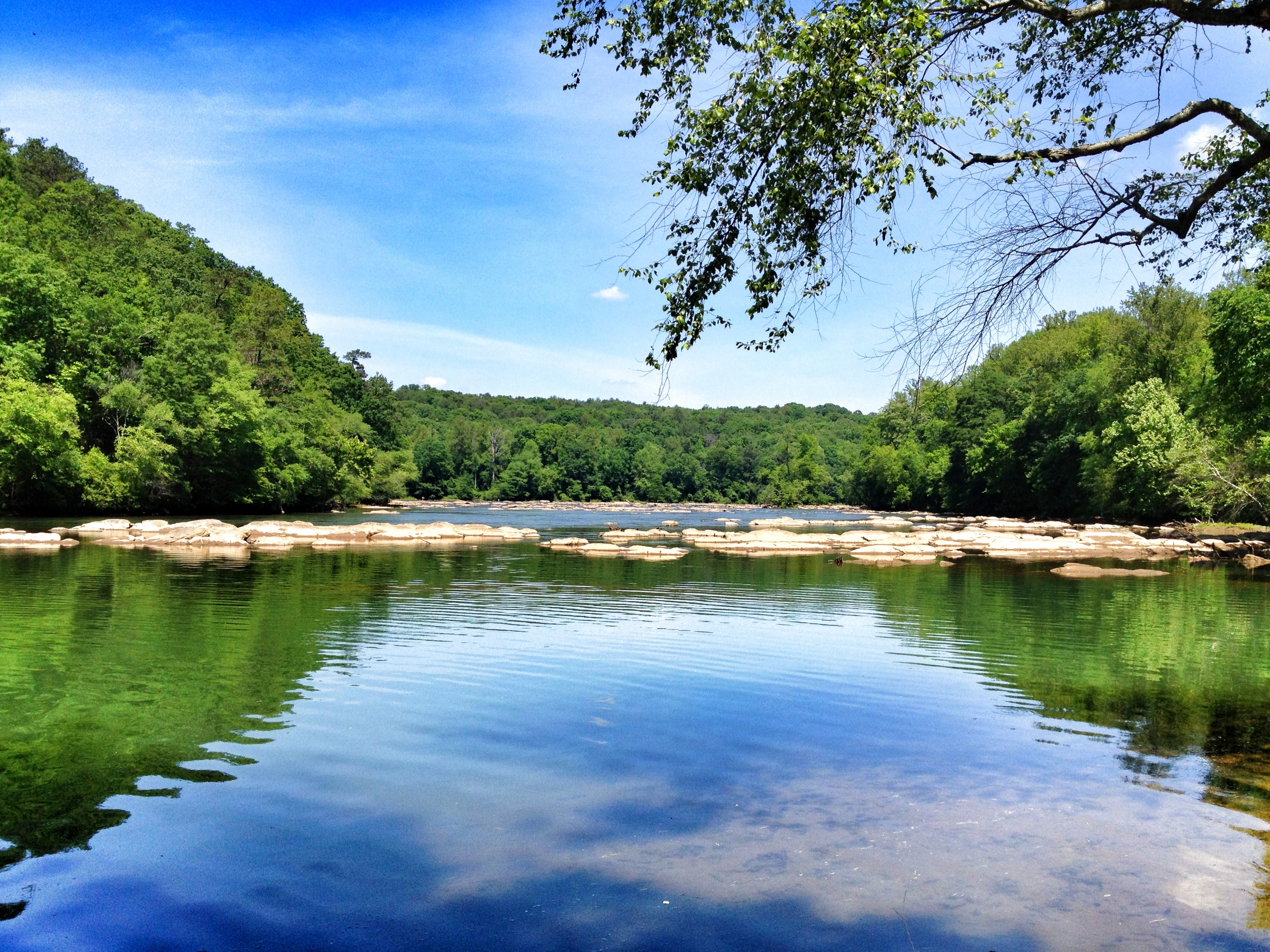
View northwards up the Chattahoochee River from Atlanta at the Chattahoochee River National Recreation Area

Several nature preserves line the south fork of Peachtree Creek in the Morningside neighborhood, including the Morningside Nature Preserve, while part of the Chattahoochee River National Recreation Area lies in the city's northwest corner.

== Atlanta Botanical Garden ==
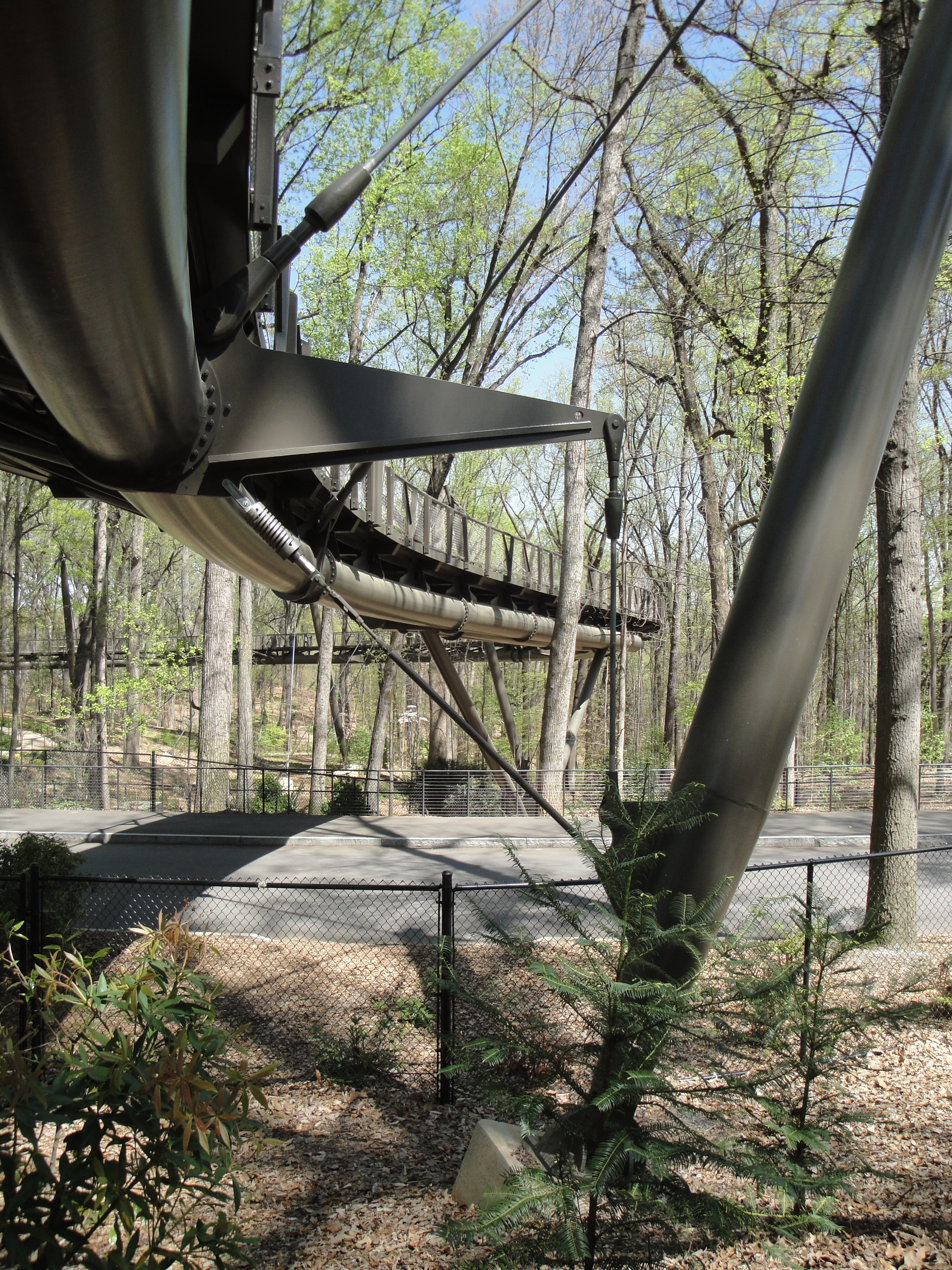
Canopy Walk at Atlanta Botanical Garden

The Atlanta Botanical Garden is home to the Canopy Walk, a 600-foot elevated walkway ambling 40 feet from the ground through a 15-acre forest of mature hardwoods, and the only canopy-level pathway of its kind in the United States.

== Trails ==
=== Beltline ===
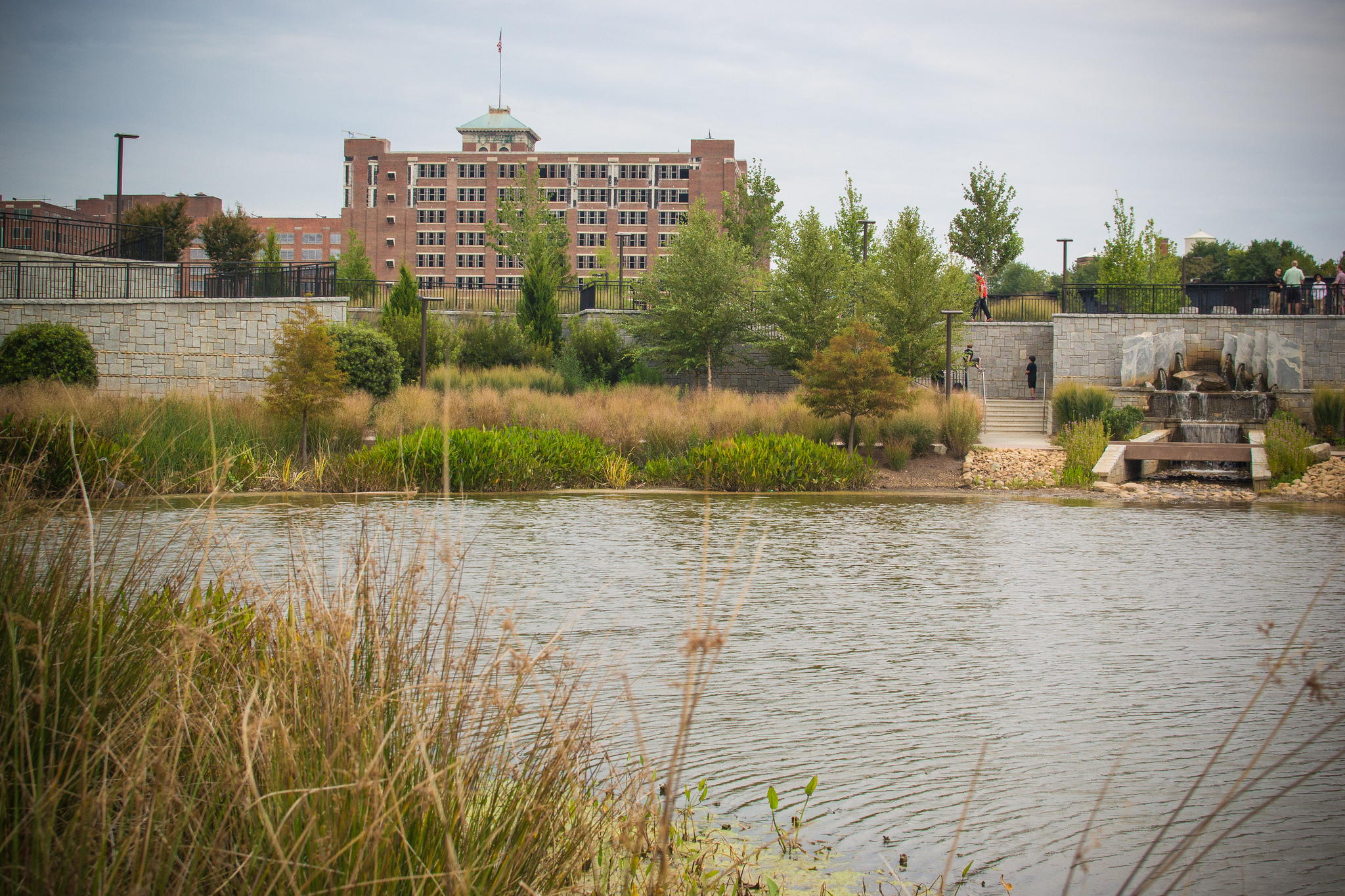
Historic Fourth Ward Park, 2012

The Beltline, a former rail corridor that forms a 22-mile (35 km) loop around Atlanta's central neighborhoods, has been acquired and transformed into public space. Most of the corridor opened in the late 2000s as a walking path, with plans for development of multi-use trails and, eventually, public transit. A trail has been constructed near the West End neighborhood, while another one, under construction as of 2012, will connect Piedmont Park to Inman Park. Beltline projects will increase Atlanta's park space by 40%, including two new parks: Historic Fourth Ward Park and Shirley Clarke Franklin Park.

=== PATH ===
In addition to Beltline trails, PATH maintains a network of biking and walking trails in Metro Atlanta, including one that traverses Atlanta's east side, past the Carter Center and through Freedom Park.

PATH400 will be a major addition to the PATH network through Buckhead.

The Cheshire Farm Trail lines the South Fork of Peachtree Creek from Lindbergh Ave. to Cheshire Bridge Road, and Maiden Trail parallels Ponce de Leon Avenue in Virginia-Highland.

== See also ==
- List of parks in Atlanta
