= Air France Flight 007 =

1962 aviation accident in France

Coordinates: 48.72°N 2.37°E

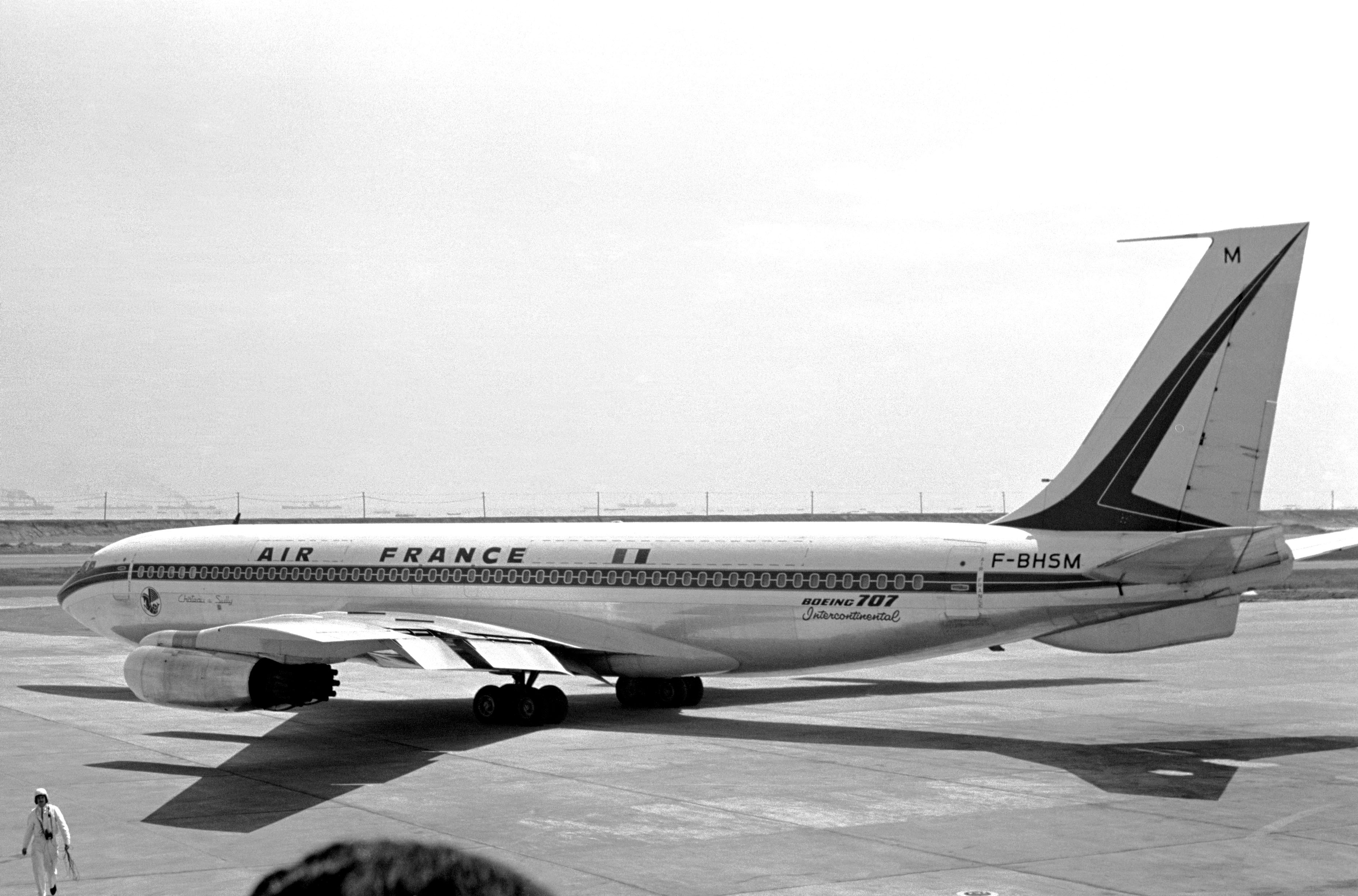
- F-BHSM, the aircraft involved in the accident, seen in May 1962

Accident
- Date: 3 June 1962
- Summary: Rejected takeoff due to mechanical failure
- Site: Orly Airport, Paris, France

Aircraft
- Aircraft type: Boeing 707-328
- Aircraft name: Château de Sully
- Operator: Air France
- IATA flight No.: AF007
- ICAO flight No.: AFR007
- Call sign: AIR FRANS 007
- Registration: F-BHSM
- Flight origin: Paris-Orly Airport, Paris, France
- 1st stopover: Idlewild Airport, New York City, United States
- 2nd stopover: Atlanta Municipal Airport, Atlanta, United States
- Destination: Houston Municipal Airport, Houston, United States
- Occupants: 132
- Passengers: 122
- Crew: 10
- Fatalities: 130
- Injuries: 2
- Survivors: 2

Air France Flight 007 crashed on 3 June 1962 while on take-off from Orly Airport. The only survivors of the disaster were two flight attendants; the other eight crew members, and all 122 passengers on board were killed. The crash was at the time the worst single-aircraft disaster and the deadliest crash involving a Boeing 707.

== Accident ==
According to witnesses, during the takeoff roll on runway 8, the nose of Flight 007 lifted off the runway, but the main landing gear remained on the ground. Though the aircraft had already exceeded the maximum speed at which the takeoff could be safely aborted within the remaining runway length, the flight crew attempted to abort the take off.

With less than 3,000 feet (910 m) of runway remaining, the pilots used the wheel brakes and reverse thrust to stop the 707. They braked so hard that they blew the main landing gear tires and destroyed the undercarriage in an attempt to ground loop. The aircraft went off the end of the runway and plowed into the town of Villeneuve-le-Roi, where a fire broke out. Three flight attendants initially survived the disaster, but one died in a hospital. At the time, it was the world's worst air disaster involving one aircraft. This death toll would be surpassed over 3.5 years later, when in February 1966, All Nippon Airways Flight 60 crashed into Tokyo Bay for reasons unknown, killing all 133 people.

== Investigation ==
Later investigation found indications that a motor driving the elevator trim may have failed, leaving Captain Roland Hoche and First Officer Jacques Pitoiset unable to complete rotation and takeoff.

== Aftermath ==
=== Impact on Atlanta, Georgia ===
The Atlanta Art Association had sponsored a month-long tour of the art treasures of Europe, and 106 of the passengers were art patrons heading home to Atlanta on this charter flight. The tour group included many of Atlanta's cultural and civic leaders. Atlanta mayor Ivan Allen Jr. went to Orly to inspect the crash site where so many Atlantans perished.

During their visit to Paris, the Atlanta arts patrons had seen Whistler's Mother at the Louvre. In late 1962, the Louvre, as a gesture of good will to the people of Atlanta, sent Whistler's Mother to Atlanta to be exhibited at the Atlanta Art Association museum on Peachtree Street.

The crash occurred during the civil rights movement in the United States. Civil rights leader Martin Luther King Jr. and entertainer and activist Harry Belafonte announced cancellation of a sit-in in downtown Atlanta (a protest of the city's racial segregation) as a conciliatory gesture to the grieving city. However, Nation of Islam leader Malcolm X, speaking in Los Angeles, expressed joy over the deaths of the all-white group from Atlanta, saying:

I would like to announce a very beautiful thing that has happened ... I got a wire from God today ... well, all right, somebody came and told me that he really had answered our prayers over in France. He dropped an airplane out of the sky with over 120 white people on it because the Muslims believe in an eye for an eye and a tooth for a tooth. But thanks to God, or Jehovah, or Allah, we will continue to pray, and we hope that every day another plane falls out of the sky.

These remarks led Los Angeles Mayor Sam Yorty to denounce him as a "fiend" and Dr. King to voice disagreement with his statement. Malcolm later remarked, "The Messenger should have done more." This incident was the first in which Malcolm X gained widespread national attention. Malcolm later explained what he meant: "When that plane crashed in France with 130 white people on it and we learned that 120 of them were from the state of Georgia, the state where my own grandfather was a slave in, well to me it couldn't have been anything but an act of God, a blessing from God".

Atlanta's Center Stage (a theatre now primarily used as a music venue) was built as a memorial to Helen Lee Cartledge, a victim of the plane crash. It was almost entirely funded by her mother Frania Lee, heiress to the Hunt Oil fortune. The theatre opened in 1966.

The Woodruff Arts Center, originally called the Memorial Arts Center and one of the United States' largest, was founded in 1968 in memory of those who died in the crash. The loss to the city was a catalyst for the arts in Atlanta, helped create this memorial to the victims, and led to the creation of the Atlanta Arts Alliance. The French government donated a Rodin sculpture, The Shade, to the High Museum of Art in memory of the victims of the crash.

Ann Uhry Abrams, the author of Explosion at Orly: The True Account of the Disaster that Transformed Atlanta, described the incident as "Atlanta's version of September 11 in that the impact on the city in 1962 was comparable to New York of September 11."

One of the victims of the flight was artist Douglas Davis Jr., known for his portraits of singer Edith Piaf that can be seen on album covers late in her career. Davis had a studio in Paris and he returned to Atlanta at the urging of his friends who were part of the Atlanta Arts patrons on board the flight. Douglas's father was Douglas Davis Sr., an accomplished air racer, who died after crashing his plane at the National Air Races in September 1934. Douglas Davis Jr. was one year younger than his father when he died in the Air France 707 Boeing crash.

== In art and popular culture ==
Andy Warhol painted his first "disaster painting", 129 Die in Jet!, based on the 4 June 1962 cover of New York Daily Mirror, the day after the crash. At that time, the death count was 129. The two known paintings are one in the Museum Ludwig in Cologne, Germany, and one in a private collection.

Jack Kerouac mentions the disaster in the opening chapters of "Satori in Paris", 1966.

Hannah Pittard's 2018 novel, Visible Empire, is loosely based on the events and its aftermath.

== See also ==
- Ameristar Charters Flight 9363, another instance of a rejected takeoff above V_{1} necessitated by a flight-control failure, albeit with a very different outcome
- Garuda Indonesia Flight 865
- Jeju Air Flight 2216
