= Hannah Pittard =

American novelist

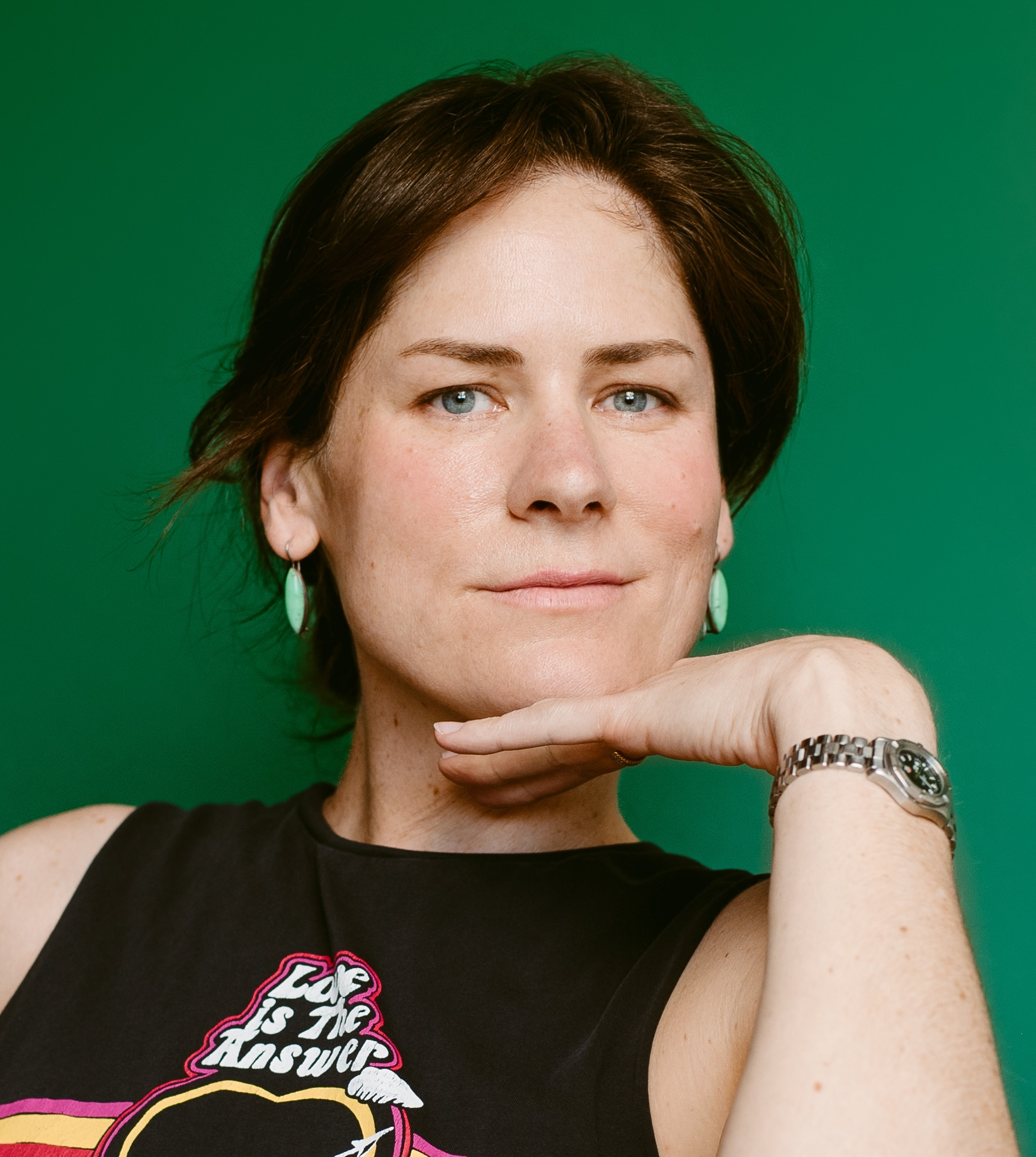
- Pittard in 2025 (photo by Ayna Lorenzo)
- Born: Georgia, U.S.
- Occupations: Novelist, professor
- Writing career
- Notable works: The Fates Will Find Their Way, Visible Empire, We Are Too Many, If You Love It, Let It Kill You

Hannah Pittard is an American novelist and author of short stories.

== Early life and education ==
Pittard was raised in Georgia. She attended Deerfield Academy in Massachusetts, where she received praise for her creative writing. She earned a bachelor's degree from the University of Chicago in 2001 and a Master of Fine Arts from the University of Virginia in 2007. She currently works at the University of Kentucky in Lexington KY. Her literary influences include Southern authors Flannery O'Connor, William Faulkner, and Harry Crews.

== Career ==
Pittard's first novel, The Fates Will Find Their Way, follows a group of boys from adolescence through middle age as they react to and speculate about a peer's mysterious disappearance. It was favorably reviewed by The New York Times Book Review and The Guardian. Pittard said that she had aimed to capture a "universal ... feeling and experience" of nostalgia.

Her second novel, Reunion, an editor's choice by the Chicago Tribune, examines the lives and relationships of adult siblings in the immediate aftermath of their father's unexpected suicide.

Listen to Me looks at personal and marital struggles of a wife and husband as they make a cross-country road trip.

Pittard's short stories have appeared in McSweeney's and Narrative Magazine.

Pittard's 2018 novel, Visible Empire, is loosely based on true events. It is the fictionalized aftermath of the 1962 Air France Flight 007 accident, which exploded on the runway, killing 130 of the 132 people on board. More than one hundred members of the Atlanta Art Association died.

In 2023, Pittard published the memoir We Are Too Many: A Memoir [Kind of], which chronicles the unraveling of her marriage after discovering her husband's affair with her best friend. The book was noted for its formal experimentation and emotional candor, and received critical attention from major outlets.

In 2025, Pittard published the novel If You Love It, Let It Kill You, which explores themes of authorship, identity, and estrangement through a metafictional narrative. The book was reviewed in The New York Times Book Review, which praised its introspective voice and narrative ambition.

== Personal life ==
Pittard was married to fellow writer Andrew Ewell from December 2012 to July 2016. After discovering that Ewell had begun a sexual relationship with her former friend Anna Shearer (the wife of mutual friend Ryan Fox), Pittard divorced Ewell. Ewell later married Shearer.

== Works ==
- The Fates Will Find Their Way (2011)
- Reunion (2014)
- Listen to Me (2016)
- Visible Empire (2018)
- We Are Too Many (2023)
- If You Love It, Let It Kill You (2025)
