= Lifting the Veil of Ignorance =

Sculptural monument in Alabama, US

- The monument in 2010
- Interactive map of Lifting the Veil of Ignorance
- Location: Tuskegee University, Tuskegee, Alabama, United States (Additional cast at Booker T. Washington High School in Atlanta)
- Coordinates: 32°25′49″N 85°42′28″W
- Designer: Charles Keck (sculptor); Palmer and Plonsky (architectural firm)
- Builder: Roman Bronze Works; Lloyd Brothers
- Length: 69 in (180 cm) (statue)
- Width: 50 in (130 cm) (statue)
- Height: 8 ft (2.4 m) (statue)
- Dedicated date: April 5, 1922
- Dedicated to: Booker T. Washington

Lifting the Veil of Ignorance (also known as the Booker T. Washington Monument and the Booker T. Washington Memorial) is a monument located on the campus of Tuskegee University in Tuskegee, Alabama, United States. It was designed by sculptor Charles Keck and depicts Booker T. Washington, the university's founder, lifting a veil from atop a seated African American man. It was dedicated in 1922. In 1927, a reproduction of the statue was commissioned for Booker T. Washington High School in Atlanta, Georgia, United States.

Planning for the statue began shortly after Washington's death in 1915, with Robert Russa Moton—Tuskegee's principal—and Emmett Jay Scott—Washington's former personal secretary—establishing a memorial fund. Two committees were established to coordinate the monument's construction, with one made up primarily of African Americans and the other of White Americans. Keck, a member of the latter committee, was selected as the designer and coordinated with both groups on the monument's creation, with the final design featuring compromises between the two groups. The statue was unveiled in a large ceremony that featured several thousand spectators.

In discussing the monument in a 2010 article in American Art, art historian Ellen Daughterty argued that the monument was created at least partially as a repudiation of the philosophies of W. E. B. Du Bois, a contemporary of Washington's whose ideas regarding political activism differed from Washington's. Daugherty also drew comparisons between the monument and two statues of American presidents—Thomas Ball's Emancipation Memorial showing Abraham Lincoln and Jean-Antoine Houdon's statue of George Washington—suggesting that Keck was trying to portray Washington as "a founding father for the black race".

== History ==
=== Creation ===
Booker T. Washington was an African American educator active in the late 19th and early 20th centuries who founded the Tuskegee Institute (renamed Tuskegee University in 1985) in Tuskegee, Alabama, in 1881. He modeled it after the Hampton Institute, a training school in Virginia that he had graduated from in 1875 and had been a faculty member of since 1879. He died in 1915 at the age of 59.

Following Washington's death, Robert Russa Moton, who had succeeded him as principal of the Tuskegee Institute, and Emmett Jay Scott, who had served as Washington's personal secretary, established a memorial fund in his honor. The two hoped to raise $2 million (equivalent to $63.7 million in 2025) in donations, of which $250,000 ($8 million in 2025) would come from the African American community and the remainder from White Americans. Scott oversaw the African American fundraising effort, while fundraising from White Americans was entrusted to William G. Willcox, who was the chairman of Tuskegee's board of trustees. While money raised from the latter would be directed towards supporting the institute, money raised from the former would go towards the creation of a monument to Washington. Committees for the memorial fund were established in 35 states and Washington, D.C., though only $25,000 ($796,000 in 2025) was raised from African American donations. However, this amount was deemed sufficient to begin creation of the monument. In total, nearly 100,000 people made donations towards the monument's creation, which would be paid for entirely by African Americans.

Following the fundraising, two committees were established to oversee the monument's creation, consisting of one based in Tuskegee and another in New York City. The Tuskegee committee was made up primarily (and possibly exclusively) of African Americans and included as members Moton, Scott, Margaret Murray Washington (Washington's widow), and Robert Robinson Taylor—an architect and faculty member at Tuskegee. Meanwhile, the New York committee consisted of White Americans, including sculptor Charles Keck and several of Tuskegee's trustees, including Willcox, Julius Rosenwald, and William Jay Schieffelin. Taylor served as the de facto coordinator of the project.

In July 1919, Taylor traveled to New York City to review possible artists for the monument, and while he had hoped to select an African American architect or sculptor for the project, he ultimately selected Keck for the role. By the end of the month, Keck traveled to Tuskegee to show the committee there eight maquettes he had created for the monument. The Tuskegee committee initially favored a design that consisted of a bust of Washington atop a pedestal. Within the pedestal would be a black man with an exposed torso who is surrounded by implements of mechanical arts. In one hand he holds a book, while with the other he is lifting a drape from himself, symbolizing the removal of a veil. The proposed monument was similar in design to another memorial present on the institute's campus, this one to former chairman of the board of trustees William Henry Baldwin Jr. This monument showed Baldwin's profile at the top of a stone slab, with a shirtless African American man underneath. Ultimately, however, the Tuskegee committee selected a design similar to the one that was ultimately executed. The most notable change requested by the Tuskegee committee was Washington's apparel, which was changed from an academic dress to a three-piece suit. In March 1920, Keck wrote to Taylor requesting several inscriptions that should be added to the monument. This proved to be a contentious topic and led to several back-and-forth letters between the Tuskegee and New York City committees over the text and placement of the inscriptions, with the final result being a compromise between the two.

Casting for the monument's statue was done by the Roman Bronze Works, while Palmer and Plonsky served as the project's architectural firm and the Lloyd Brothers served as fabricators.

=== Dedication and later history ===
The monument was dedicated on the campus of the institute on April 5, 1922, in a ceremony that was attended by a mixed-race crowd of several thousand African Americans and White Americans. The dedication coincided with the institution's annual Founder's Day. For the ceremony, an Honorary Unveiling Committee was created, composed of African American community leaders who had been friends of Washington's. Additionally, the National Urban League sent representatives to the ceremony, while both the National Negro Press Association and the National Baptist Convention held meetings at the institute to coincide with the large gathering of people.

Founder's Day activities began at 2 p.m. at the institute's chapel. These events included addresses from several individuals, including General Education Board member Wallace Buttrick, former United States Secretary of the Navy Josephus Daniels, and activist George Cleveland Hall. Several religious folk songs and hymns were also sung, while Bishop Robert Elijah Jones of the Methodist Episcopal Church said a prayer. At 3:45 p.m., the events shifted to the dedication of the monument, which began with a playing of Tuskegee's school song. The monument was then presented by Scott and accepted on behalf of the board of trustees by Willcox. The main address was then given by Alvin J. Neely, a Tuskegee graduate from the class of 1908. Additionally, Moton read aloud a letter sent by President Warren G. Harding commemorating the monument. The ceremony ended with a playing of "My Country, 'Tis of Thee" and a benediction by Isaiah Montgomery.

In 1993, the statue was surveyed as part of the Save Outdoor Sculpture! program. As of 2010, the monument is a visible icon of the university, with an image of the statue used in the university's official seal.

=== Atlanta reproduction ===
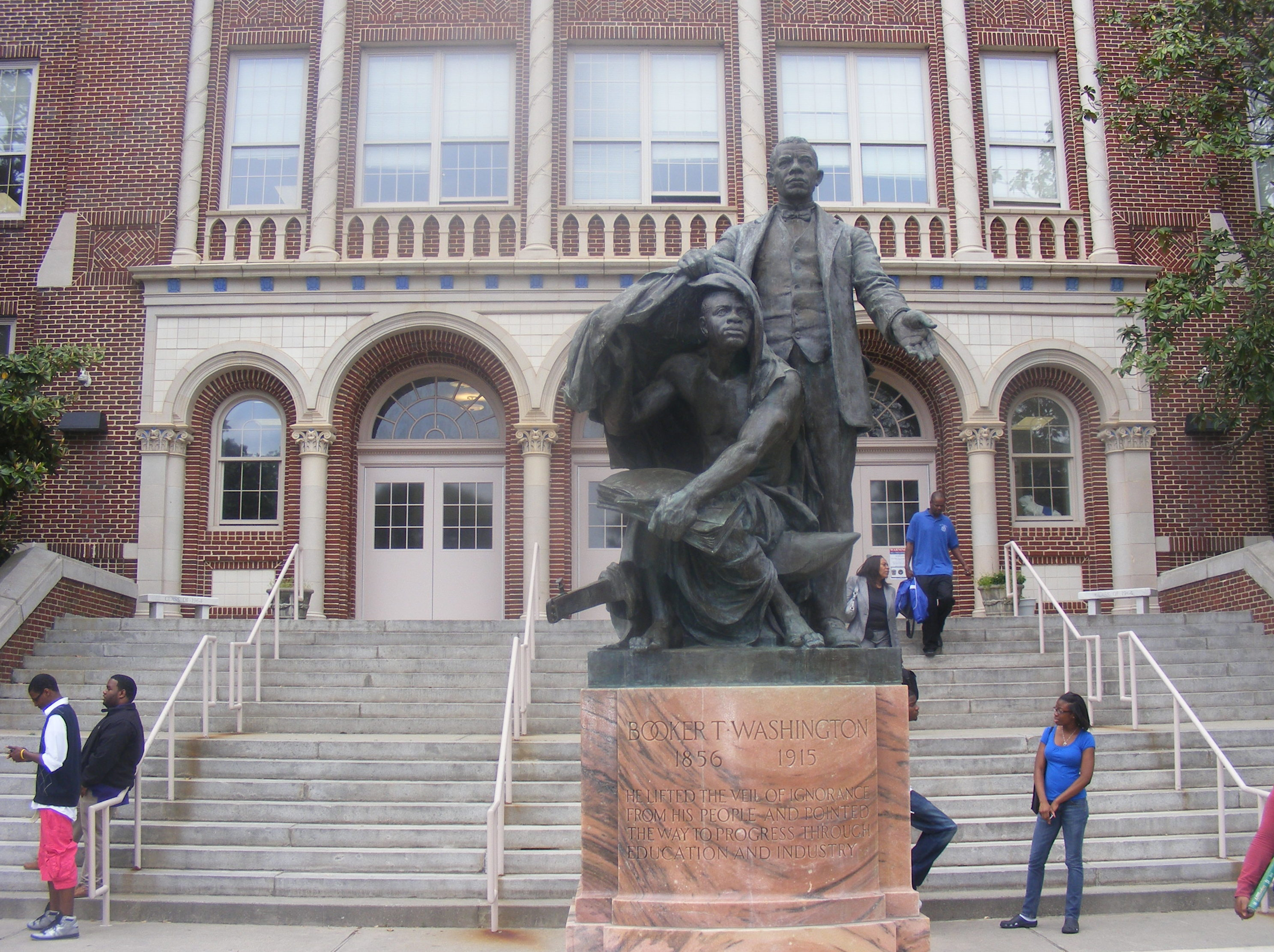
A reproduction of the statue in front of Booker T. Washington High School in Atlanta, pictured 2009

In 1927, Charles Lincoln Harper, the principal of Booker T. Washington High School—the first public high school for African Americans in Atlanta—commissioned a reproduction of the statue to be installed at the high school. It is the only reproduction that was made of the original statue in Tuskegee. It was surveyed as part of the Save Outdoor Sculpture! program in 1994.

== Design ==
The monument, variously referred to as Lifting the Veil of Ignorance, the Booker T. Washington Monument, and the Booker T. Washington Memorial, is located at the center of Tuskegee University's campus. It consists of a bronze statue atop a granite pedestal and exedra. The statue element is 8 feet (2.4 meters) tall and has length and width measurements of 69 inches (180 centimeters) by 50 in (130 cm). The pedestal, meanwhile, has a height of 50 in (130 cm). The exedra measures 36 in (91 cm) high and has an area measurement of 27 ft (8.2 m) by 30 in (76 cm). The exedra curves around a granite oval platform, with the pedestal at its center. Both the pedestal and exedra feature decorative designs of leaves and pine cones.

The statue depicts Washington, standing and wearing a suit. His left arm is outstretched, while his right hand grasps a drapery. African American male who is seated nude on an anvil, covered only by pieces of drapery that rest on his lap and other parts of his body. In his left hand, he holds an angle, a book, and a compass, which are resting on his lap. He is looking upwards and his right hand is raised, positioned directly underneath the drapery. On the ground around him are several tools used in agriculture and mechanical work, such as a pair of pliers, a plow, and a sledgehammer. At the statue's base are inscriptions indicating the sculptor ("C. Keck. Sc.") and the foundry ("Cast by Roman Bronze Works, NY").

=== Inscriptions ===
The statue and surrounding exedra in 2010

The monument's base bears several inscriptions, including quotes from Washington. On the front of the pedestal directly underneath the statue is the following:

BOOKER T. WASHINGTON / 1856 1915 / HE LIFTED THE VEIL OF IGNORANCE / FROM HIS PEOPLE AND POINTED / THE WAY TO PROGRESS THROUGH / EDUCATION AND INDUSTRY

On the back of the pedestal is the following:

THIS MONUMENT IS ERECTED BY / CONTRIBUTIONS FROM NEGROES / IN THE UNITED STATES AS A LOVING / TRIBUTE TO THE MEMORY OF THEIR / GREAT LEADER AND BENEFACTOR

On the proper left of the pedestal:

I WILL LET NO MAN DRAG ME DOWN / SO LOW AS TO MAKE ME HATE HIM

On the proper right:

THERE IS NO DEFENSE OR / SECURITY FOR ANY OF US EXCEPT / IN THE HIGHEST INTELLIGENCE / AND DEVELOPMENT OF ALL.

The following inscription is present on the exedra, directly above a bench area and interrupted by the pedestal:

WE SHALL PROSPER IN PROPORTION AS WE / LEARN TO DIGNIFY AND GLORIFY LABOR / AND PUT BRAINS AND SKILL INTO THE / COMMON OCCUPATIONS OF LIFE

=== Differences with the Atlanta reproduction ===
The monument in Atlanta, called Booker T. Washington Lifting the Veil of Ignorance, consists of the same statue, also made of bronze, but features a pedestal made of Georgia marble. This pedestal bears the same front inscription as the original but has the "I will let no man ..." and "There is no defense ..." quotes both on its proper right side, while its proper left side bears the "We shall prosper ..." quote. Additionally, the rear of the pedestal bears the following inscription:

TEACHERS AND STUDENTS OF THE / BOOKER T. WASHINGTON JR. SR. HIGH SCHOOL / AND WHITE AND COLORED CITIZENS OF ATLANTA / AS A LIVING TRIBUTE TO THE MEMORY OF / A GREAT EDUCATOR PATRIOT AND ADVOCATE / OF INTERRACIAL JUSTICE

== Analysis ==
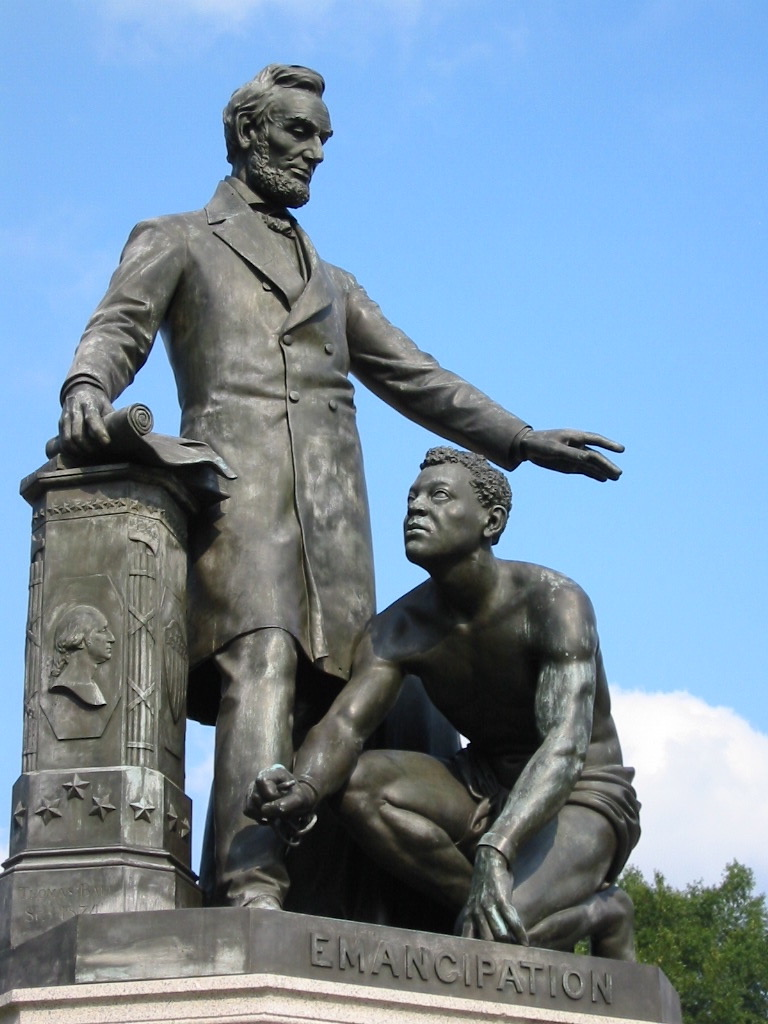
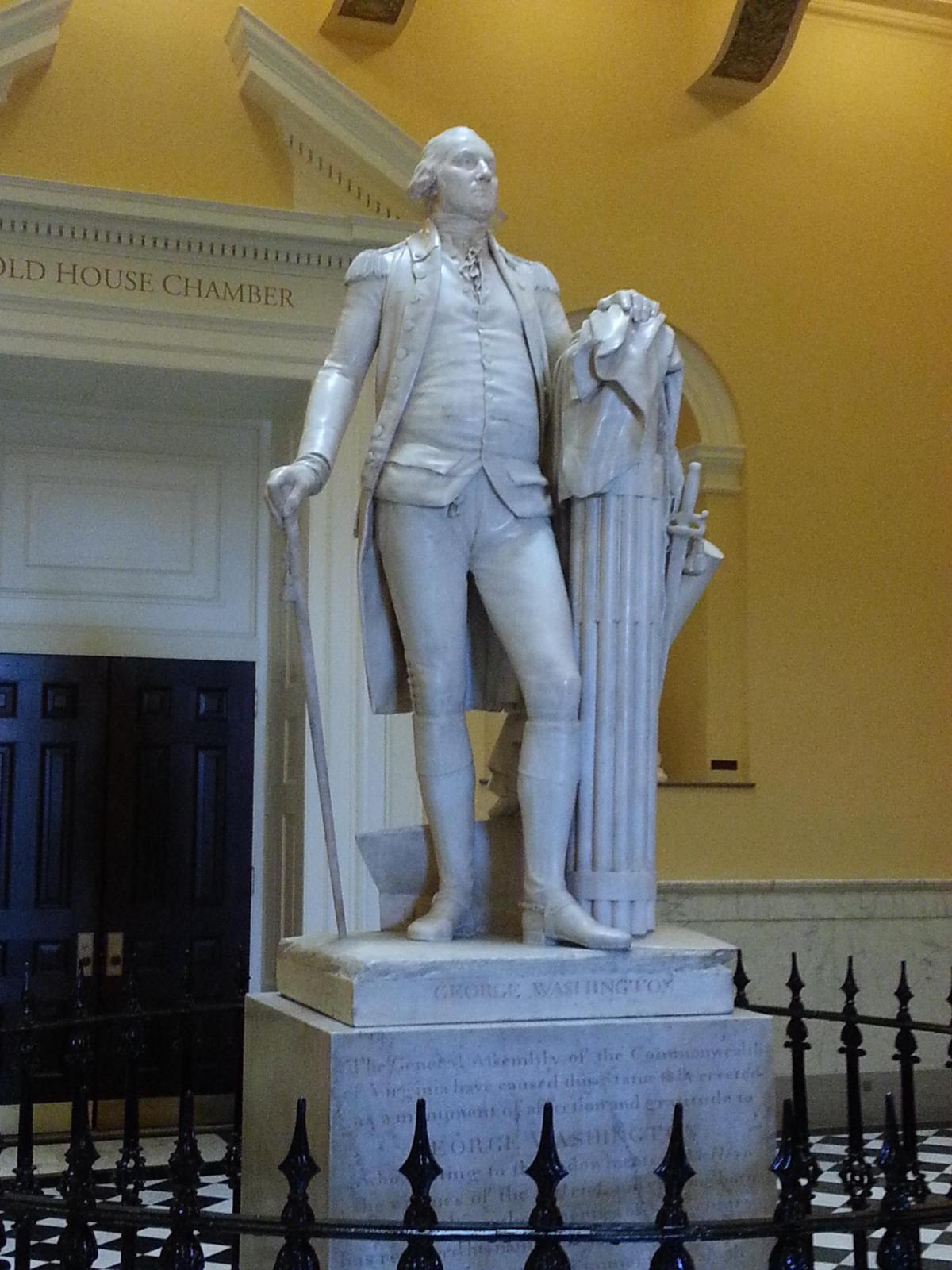
Art historian Ellen Daugherty has compared the monument to Thomas Ball's Emancipation Memorial (left) and Jean-Antoine Houdon's statue of George Washington.

In a 2010 article published in the academic journal American Art, art historian Ellen Daugherty said that "many viewers have been troubled by the ambiguity of the monument". To express this point, she cites a passage from the 1952 novel Invisible Man, written by former Tuskegee student Ralph Ellison and based on his experience at the institute, which reads:

Then in my mind's eye I see the bronze statue of the college Founder, the cold Father symbol, his hands outstretched in the breathtaking gesture of lifting a veil that flutters in hard, metallic folds above the face of a kneeling slave; and I am standing puzzled, unable to decide whether the veil is really being lifted, or lowered more firmly in place; whether I am witnessing a revelation or a more efficient binding.

— Ralph Ellison, Invisible Man

According to Daugherty, the statue focuses on Washington's actions and not on those of the seated man, drawing comparisons to the depiction of President Abraham Lincoln in Thomas Ball's Emancipation Memorial, which shows Lincoln as an emancipator standing over a kneeling slave. Daugherty suggests a parallel between Washington and Lincoln, with Washington continuing Lincoln's work by empowering African Americans through education and industrial training. However, in contrast to the Emancipation Memorial, which Daugherty says shows a clear divide between Lincoln and the kneeling man, the Washington monument highlights the similarities between the two men featured in the statue, highlighting Washington's emphasis on self-help. A review of the statue in the Hampton Institute's Southern Workman newspaper reads: "The likeness of the face of the crouching slave-figure to that of the great leader is symbolical, showing how one may become refined and spiritualized by the influence of thought and high aspirations." Daugherty also notes similarities between Washington's depiction and Jean-Antoine Houdon's statue of George Washington, suggesting that Keck was trying to portray Washington as "a founding father for the black race".

=== Repudiation of W. E. B. Du Bois ===
Daugherty believes that the monument was intended at least partially as a repudiation of the philosophies of W. E. B. Du Bois, a prominent critic of Washington during the early 20th century who advocated for more radical political activity than Washington. According to Daugherty, by 1922, Washington's philosophies had declined in popularity and were being replaced by more activist ideas about directly demanding civil rights. In contrast to Du Bois's ideologies, Daughterty states that the monument supports the idea of "racial uplift", which was espoused by Washington. This idea is also supported by historian Zion McThomas in a 2023 analysis of the monument for the Jule Collins Smith Museum of Fine Art at Auburn University, who said that the monument was "a marker of shallow racial unity in the midst of the Jim Crow Era".

== See also ==
- 1922 in art
- List of public art in Atlanta

== Sources ==
- Daugherty, Ellen (Fall 2010). "Negotiating the Veil: Tuskegee's Booker T. Washington Monument". American Art. 24 (3). Chicago: University of Chicago Press: 52–77. doi:10.1086/658209. ISSN 1549-6503. JSTOR 10.1086/658209. OCLC 24162804.
- Programme and Addresses in Connection with Unveiling Exercises of the Booker T. Washington Memorial. 1922. OCLC 758747157.
