= List of things named after John J. Pershing =

General of the Armies John J. Pershing
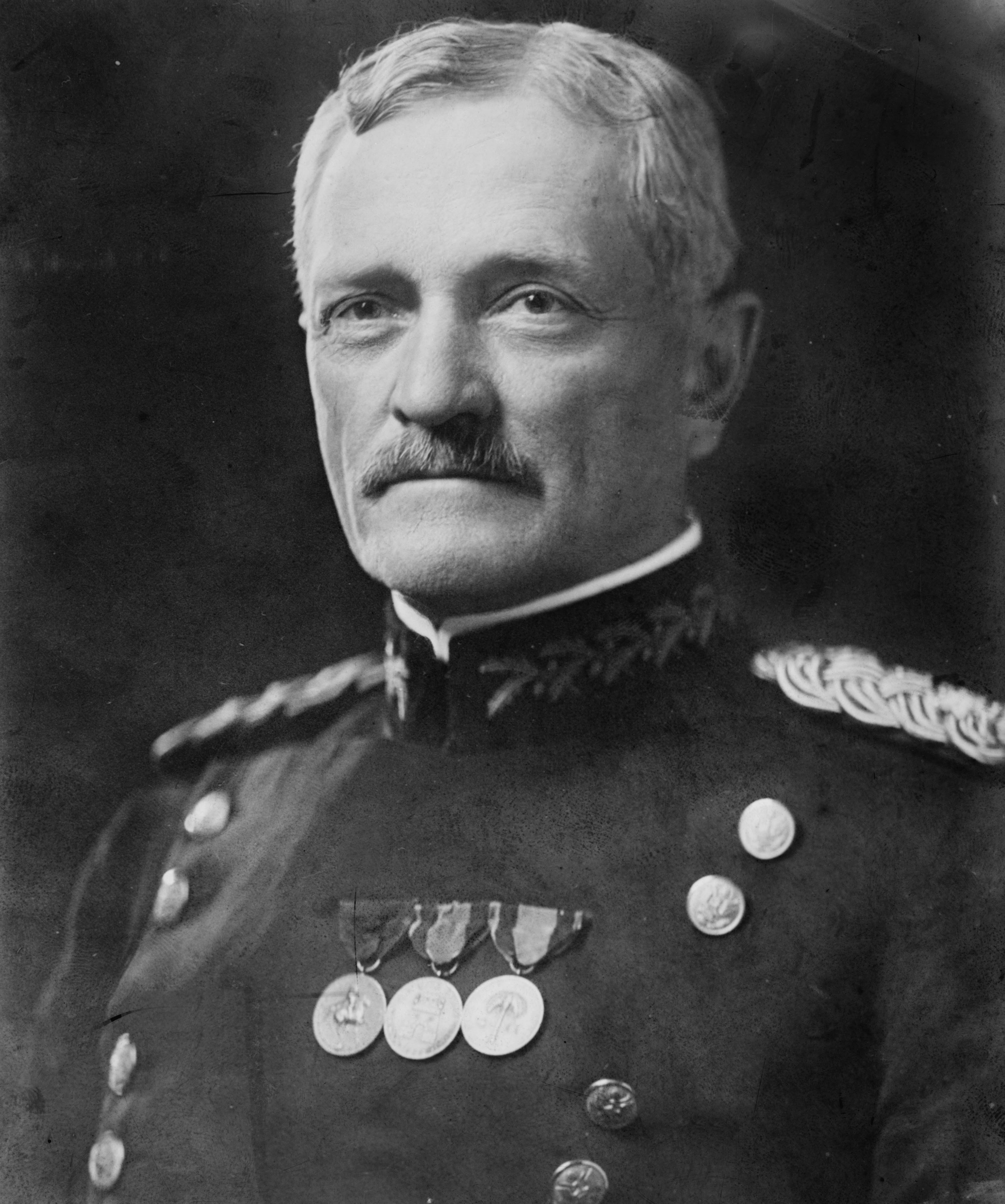
- Born: John Joseph Pershing; September 13, 1860; Laclede, Missouri, U.S.
- Died: July 15, 1948 (aged 87); Walter Reed General Hospital; Washington, D.C., U.S.
- Burial place: Arlington National Cemetery, Arlington County, Virginia, U.S.
- Military career
- Allegiance: United States
- Branch: United States Army
- Service years: 1886–1924
- Rank: General of the Armies
- Nickname: "Black Jack"
- Service number: O-1
- Commands: 8th Brigade; Mexican Expedition; American Expeditionary Force; First United States Army; Chief of Staff of the United States Army
- Conflicts: Indian Wars: Apache Wars; Sioux Wars; Spanish–American War: Battle of San Juan Hill; Philippine–American War: Moro Rebellion; Russo-Japanese War; Mexican Revolution: Pancho Villa Expedition; World War I: Western Front
- Awards: Distinguished Service Cross; Distinguished Service Medal; Silver Star; Honorary Knight Grand Cross of the Order of the Bath (United Kingdom); Légion d'honneur (France)

General of the Armies John Joseph "Black Jack" Pershing (September 13, 1860 – July 15, 1948) was a senior United States Army officer. His most famous post was when he served as the commander of the American Expeditionary Force (AEF) on the Western Front in World War I, 1917–18.

Pershing was immensely popular after World War I, and as a result a large number of organizations, equipment, streets and buildings are named after him throughout the United States and abroad:

== Organizations ==
- The National Society of Pershing Rifles, founded by Pershing, continues on today as America's premier undergraduate military fraternal organization. He also founded the Military Order of the World Wars.
- The 2nd Armored Brigade Combat Team of the 1st Cavalry Division (United States) is nicknamed "Black Jack."
- The 4th Squadron of the 10th US Cavalry, part of the 4th Infantry Division's 3rd Brigade Combat Team, is nicknamed the Blackjack Squadron
- B Troop (Black Jack Troop) 5/15 Cavalry Regiment at Fort Knox, Kentucky, the home of Armor and Cavalry where brand new 19D Cavalry Scouts are trained. A parade field in front of the B Troop barracks is called "Pershing Field" in honor of the General, and a placard of his works lies in its corner.
- The United States Army Band, founded by Pershing, is nicknamed "Pershing's Own".

== Military ordnance and other equipment ==
- The M26 Pershing tank was an American armored vehicle introduced in 1945.
- The MGM-31 Pershing and Pershing II missile systems
- In 1938, the Chicago, Burlington and Quincy Railroad named a diesel engined streamliner train the General Pershing Zephyr.

== Buildings ==
=== Schools ===
==== Elementary schools ====
Berwyn, Illinois; Joliet, Illinois; West Milwaukee, Wisconsin; Muskogee, Oklahoma; Lincoln, Nebraska; Killeen, Texas (Fort Hood); Orangevale, California; Dallas, Texas; Saint Joseph, Missouri; Orlando, Florida; Fort Meade, Maryland; University City, Missouri, Daly City, California

==== Middle schools ====
Houston, Texas; Springfield, Missouri; Sunset Park, Brooklyn, New York City; San Diego, California

==== High schools ====
Detroit, Michigan

=== College buildings ===
- Pershing Arena, Pershing Society, Pershing Hall, and the Pershing Scholarships of Truman State University in Kirksville, Missouri (Pershing's former college)
- Pershing Barracks at the United States Military Academy. Completed in 1895 as the Academic Building for West Point, it was renamed the West Academic Building in 1913. It was later converted to a barracks and renamed Pershing Barracks.
- John J. Pershing Military and Naval Science Building of University of Nebraska–Lincoln
- Pershing Hall of Montana State University – Northern in Havre, Montana
- Pershing Hall, part of the University of Missouri, Columbia, Missouri
- Pershing Walk, a campus street at Culver Military Academy, Culver, Indiana

=== Military buildings ===
- Pershing Hall in The Presidio of San Francisco in San Francisco, California
- Pershing Hall on Governors Island in New York Harbor
- Pershing Community Center, Fort Leonard Wood, Missouri
- Pershing House in Fort Sam Houston, San Antonio, Texas

=== Other buildings ===
- The Pershing Center, a multi-purpose arena in downtown Lincoln, Nebraska
- The Pershing Building in Kansas City, Missouri, located on Pershing Road
- The John J. Pershing VA Medical Center, in Poplar Bluff, Missouri.
- Pershing Memorial Hospital in Brookfield Missouri
- The Pershing Hall in Paris, France.
- Pershing Memorial Hospital in Brookfield, Missouri

== Places ==
=== Streets ===
- Pershing or General Pershing Avenue: St. Louis, Missouri (previously known as Berlin Avenue); Fort Riley, Kansas; Phoenix, Arizona; Cleveland, Ohio; Orlando, Florida; San Jose, California; Stockton, California; Orangevale, California; Davenport, Iowa; Ocean Springs, Mississippi; Fort Worth, Texas; Rensselaer, New York; Milltown, New Jersey; Lancaster, Pennsylvania; Leechburg, Pennsylvania; Salem, Ohio; York, Pennsylvania
  - Avenida General Pershing in the San Isidro District of Lima, Peru
- Pershing or General Pershing Boulevard: North Little Rock, Arkansas, Oklahoma City, Oklahoma (on the Oklahoma State Fairgrounds, formerly part of Main Street); Cheyenne, Wyoming (a main road to Warren AFB); Kenosha, Wisconsin
  - Boulevard Pershing on the western edge of Paris, France runs past the Palais des Congrès near the Porte Maillot. Many of the major streets in the area (the 16th arrondissement) are named after notable French military figures, including Avenue Foch, named after Marshal Foch, and at either end of Boulevard Pershing, streets named after the Marshals of France Gouvion Saint-Cyr and Koenig. It reflects the immense popularity of the American troops who first arrived in the French capital in 1916.
  - Boulevard John-Joseph Pershing in Limpertsberg, Luxembourg
- Pershing or General Pershing Drive: El Paso, Texas; North Omaha, Nebraska; Florence, Nebraska; Arlington, Virginia; Arlington National Cemetery; El Segundo/Playa del Rey, California; Decatur, Illinois; Derby, Connecticut; Silver Spring, Maryland;San Diego, California
- Pershing Road (Weehawken) in Weehawken, New Jersey
- Pershing or General Pershing Road: Chicago (formerly 39th Street); Kansas City, Missouri (the northern border to the Liberty Memorial, the Official National World War I Memorial); Fort Bliss, Texas
- Pershing or General Pershing Street: Houston; New Orleans (in the uptown section); Hamden, Connecticut; Hammond, Louisiana; Portland, Oregon; Cranston, Rhode Island

=== Squares and plazas ===
- Pershing Square in downtown Los Angeles
- Pershing Square in New York City on 42nd Street at Park Avenue in front of Grand Central Terminal
- Pershing Square in The Presidio of San Francisco in San Francisco, California
- Plaza Pershing in Zamboanga City, Philippines

=== Parks ===
- Pershing Point Park in Atlanta, Georgia (opened in 1920)
- Pershing Field Memorial Park in Jersey City, New Jersey (opened in 1922)
- Pershing Park in Washington, D.C. features the Pershing Memorial
- Pershing State Park, in north-central Missouri between Laclede and Meadville
- Pershing Park in Minneapolis, Minnesota, Racine, Wisconsin and Arkansas City, Kansas
- Pershing Field in Fort Carson, Colorado
- Stade Pershing, a baseball park in Paris, France

=== Other places ===
- Pershing County, Nevada
- Mount Pershing, in the Olympic Mountains of Washington (state)

== Miscellaneous ==
- A riderless horse was named in honor of Pershing, "Black Jack". This horse was used for many years in funerals for heads of state, including President John F. Kennedy.
- The Pershing Division of the Clarence Cannon Conference, a high school athletic conference in Northeastern Missouri in the area where the general lived during his youth. The other division in the conference honors Harry S. Truman.
- The John J. Pershing Grille is a casual dining room at the University Club of Washington, DC. Pershing, a member of the Club, dedicated its current clubhouse, located at 1135 Sixteenth Street, in 1921.
- The Great Pershing Balloon Derby at Brookfield, Missouri is named in his honor and is held over the Labor Day weekend each year.
- General Pershing, a British racehorse that took part in the 1995 Grand National Steeplechase.
- The Persian donut, popular around Thunder Bay, Ontario, was said to have been named after him.
