= Glenn Building =

- U.S. National Register of Historic Places
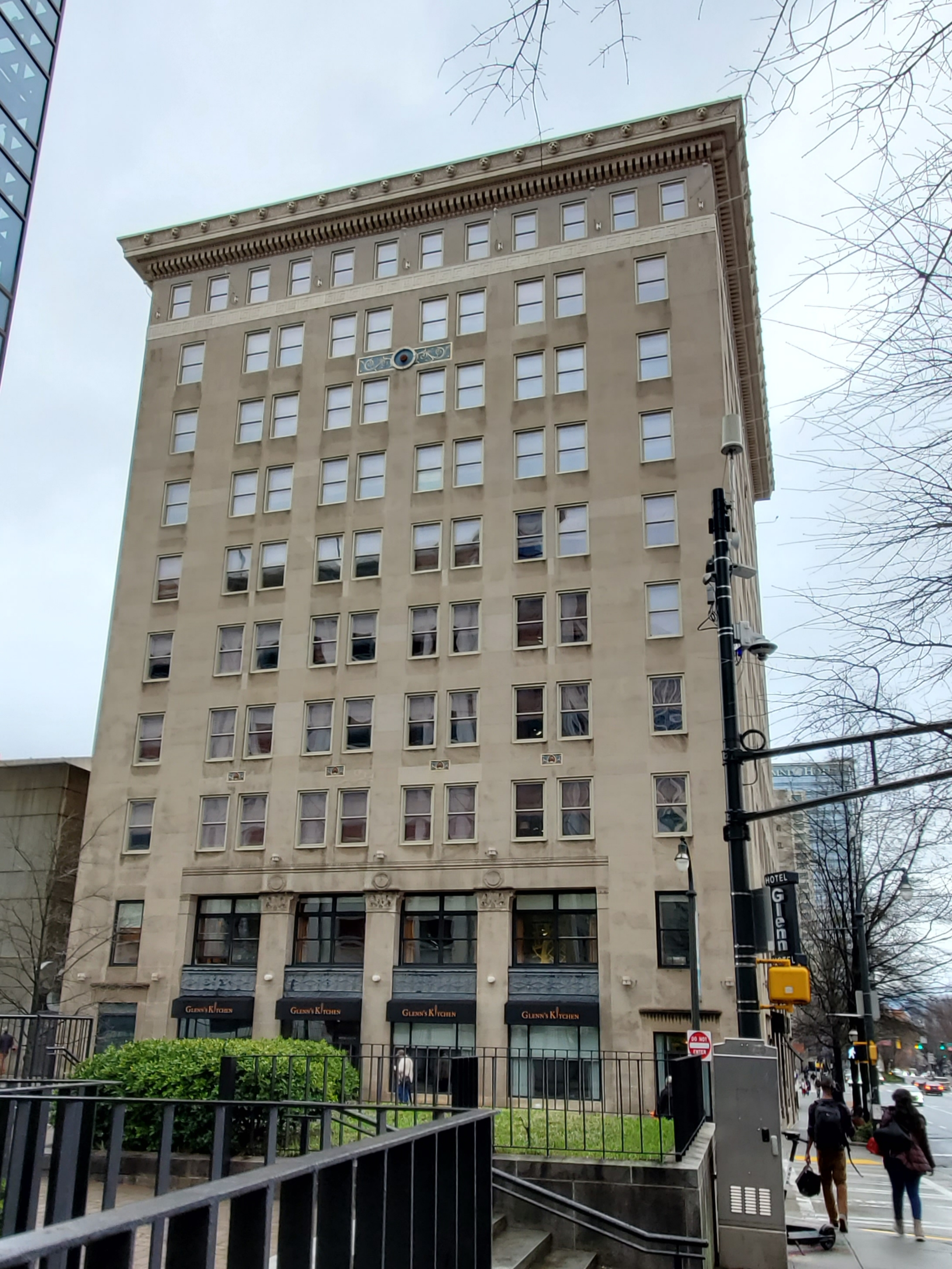
- Glenn Building in 2020

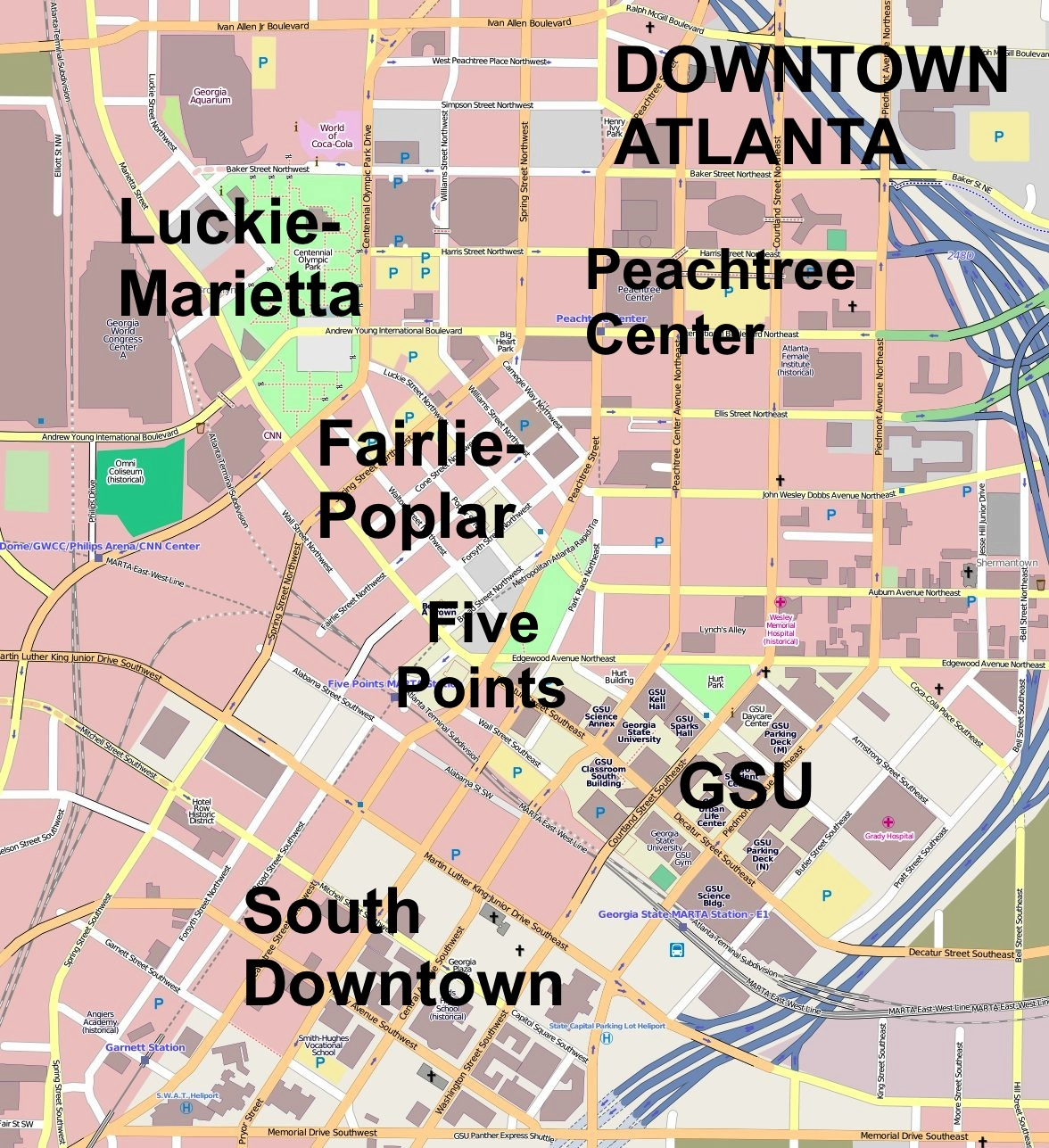
- Location within Downtown Atlanta Location within Atlanta Location within Georgia Location within the United States
- Location: 110 Marietta Street NW; Atlanta, Georgia, United States
- Coordinates: 33.756983°N 84.392969°W
- Area: less than one acre
- Built: 1923
- Architect: Wadley B. Wood; George A. Fuller
- Architectural style: Classical Revival
- Website: glennhotel.com
- NRHP reference No.: 08000350
- Added to NRHP: April 29, 2008

The Glenn Building is a historic building on Marietta Street in downtown Atlanta, Georgia, United States. Built in 1923 as an office building, the building was converted to a boutique hotel in 2006 and added to the National Register of Historic Places in 2008.

== History ==
The Glenn Building was built in 1923. That same year, construction of the Spring Street viaduct led to a boom in development on the west side of downtown Atlanta which included the nearby Bona Allen Office Building. The ten-story building was designed by Wadley B. Wood of Washington, D.C., and originally served as an office building. It was named after former mayor of Atlanta John Thomas Glenn. An Art Deco parking garage was constructed adjacent to the building in 1928, but was demolished in the 1990s and replaced by a larger parking garage. In the late 1980s, the Federal Reserve Bank of Atlanta purchased the building as a possible expansion site, but sold the building after deciding to instead relocate to midtown Atlanta.

In 2003, Central Atlanta Progress placed the building on a top 10 "development opportunities" in downtown Atlanta, alongside other derelict or abandoned buildings such as the Medical Arts Building and the Winecoff Hotel. In 2006, the building underwent a $6 million renovation that converted the building into a boutique hotel as part of the Autograph Collection under Marriott International. Several sources cite the Glenn Hotel as the first boutique hotel in downtown Atlanta. The building was added to the National Register of Historic Places in 2008. In 2015, Alexi Torres was commissioned by the building owners to paint a mural on a side of the building.

== See also ==
- National Register of Historic Places listings in Fulton County, Georgia
- Hotels in Atlanta
