= 129 Die in Jet! =

1962 painting by Andy Warhol

129 Die in Jet! (1962) by Andy Warhol

129 Die in Jet! is a painting created by American Pop artist Andy Warhol in 1962, made with acrylic and pencil on canvas, 100 x 72 inches (254 x 182.9 cm). It is held in the Museum Ludwig, in Cologne.

== Interpretation ==
Warhol created this work after the Air France Flight 007 accident in which 129 (later 130 after one died of injuries) people aboard were killed with only two (initially three) survivors. The Atlanta Art Association had sponsored a month-long tour of the art treasures of Europe, and 106 of the passengers were art patrons heading home to Atlanta on this charter flight. The tour group included many of Atlanta's cultural and civic leaders. Atlanta mayor Ivan Allen Jr. went to Orly to inspect the crash site where so many important Atlantans perished.
