= John Thomas Glenn =

American politician

Mayor of Atlanta
- In office 1889–1891

Personal details
- Born: March 21, 1844 McDonough, Georgia, U.S.
- Died: March 14, 1899 (aged 54) Atlanta, Georgia, U.S.
- Resting place: Oakland Cemetery; Atlanta, Georgia
- Spouse: Helen Augusta Garrard
- Education: University of Georgia
- Profession: Lawyer

Military service
- Allegiance: Confederate States
- Branch/service: Confederate States Army
- Rank: Captain
- Battles/wars: American Civil War

John Thomas Glenn (March 21, 1844 – March 14, 1899) was the 31st Mayor of Atlanta from 1889 to 1891, and the son of another Atlanta mayor, Luther Glenn, and like his father an attorney at law.

== Biography ==
At the beginning of the American Civil War he was attending the University of Georgia where he received a Bachelor of Arts degree just before the institution was shut down in September 1863. He then served as a captain in the Confederate army.

After the war, on April 23, 1873, he married Helen Augusta Garrard (1850–1924) of Columbus, Georgia, where her father William Waters Garrard (1818 – 1866) practiced law. They had four children who lived to adulthood: Isa Garteray Urquhart Glenn (1874 – 1951), a novelist and contemporary of Ellen Glasgow; Garrard Glenn (1878 – 1949), noted attorney in New York City and subsequently professor of law at The University of Virginia; Helen Mildred Lewis Glenn (1884 – 1972), who married Theodore Gordon Ellyson of Richmond, Virginia, the first Naval aviator; and William Louis Glenn (1887–1950), an attorney in New York City.

Glenn practiced law in Atlanta, served as Atlanta's mayor, and died less than a decade later. Money from his estate was used to develop the Glenn Building at Spring St and Marietta which was commissioned by the George Fuller Company to coincide with the Spring Street Viaduct which they were building at the time. It was completed in 1923 and named for him.

== Notes ==
| Preceded by John Tyler Cooper | Mayor of Atlanta; January 1889 – January 1891 | Succeeded by William Hemphill |
