= Pershing Point Park =

Park in Atlanta, Georgia, United States

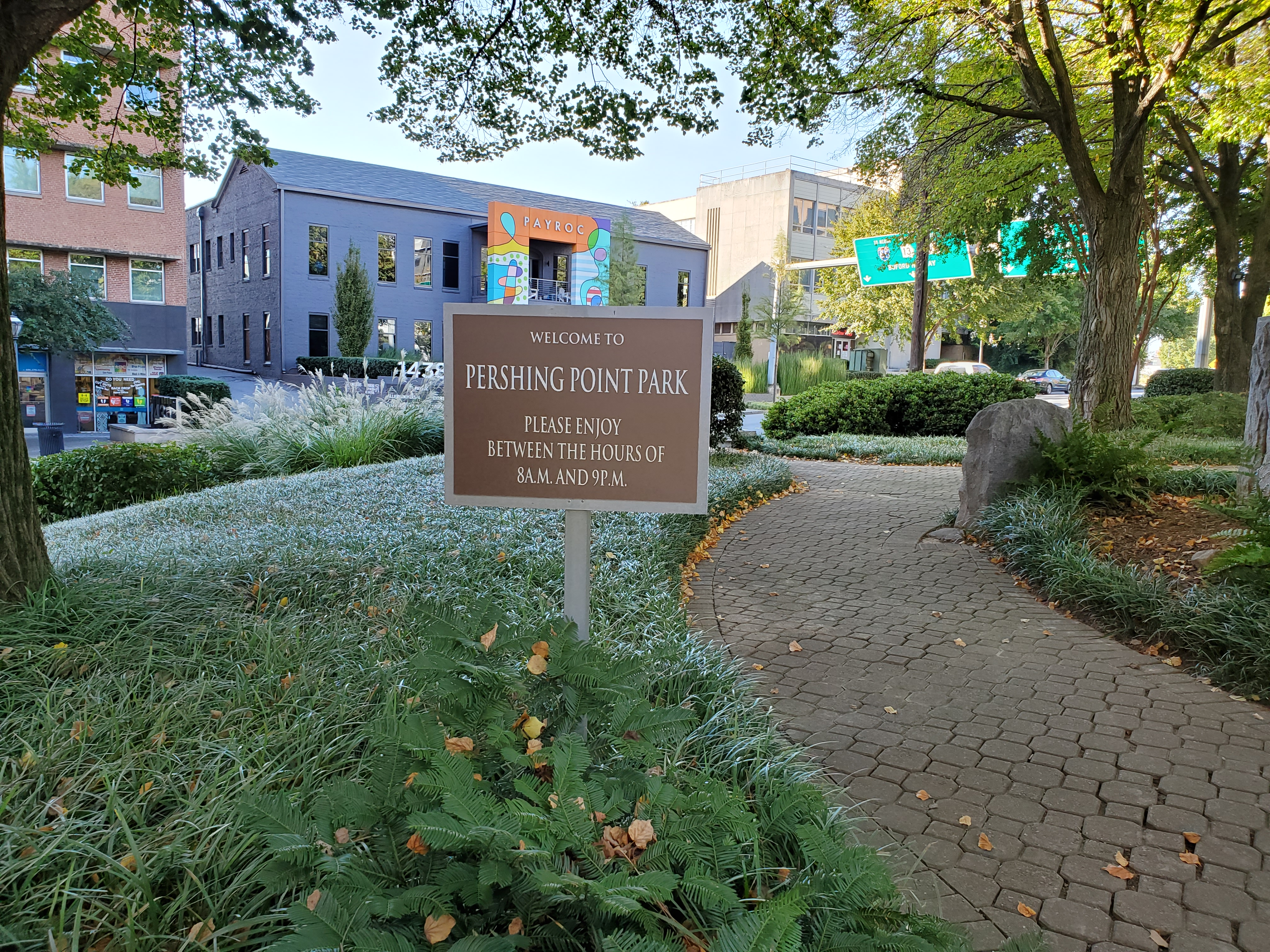
- Pershing Point Park (2020)

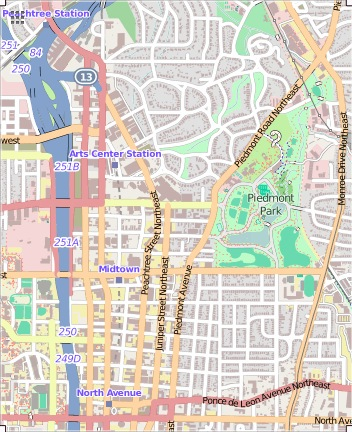
- Location within Atlanta Midtown Location within Atlanta Location within Georgia Location within the United States
- Location: Midtown Atlanta, Georgia, United States
- Coordinates: 33°47′38″N 84°23′15″W
- Opened: 1920

Pershing Point Park, also known as Pershing Point Memorial Park, is a small public park in Atlanta, Georgia, United States. The park, located in midtown Atlanta, is formed by the intersection of Peachtree Street and West Peachtree Street. It was dedicated in the 1920s in honor of General of the Armies John J. Pershing and includes a memorial to Fulton County soldiers who died in World War I. The World Athletes Monument is also located in the park. A 2018 article in The Atlanta Journal-Constitution listed the park as one of three World War I memorials in the Atlanta metropolitan area.

== History ==
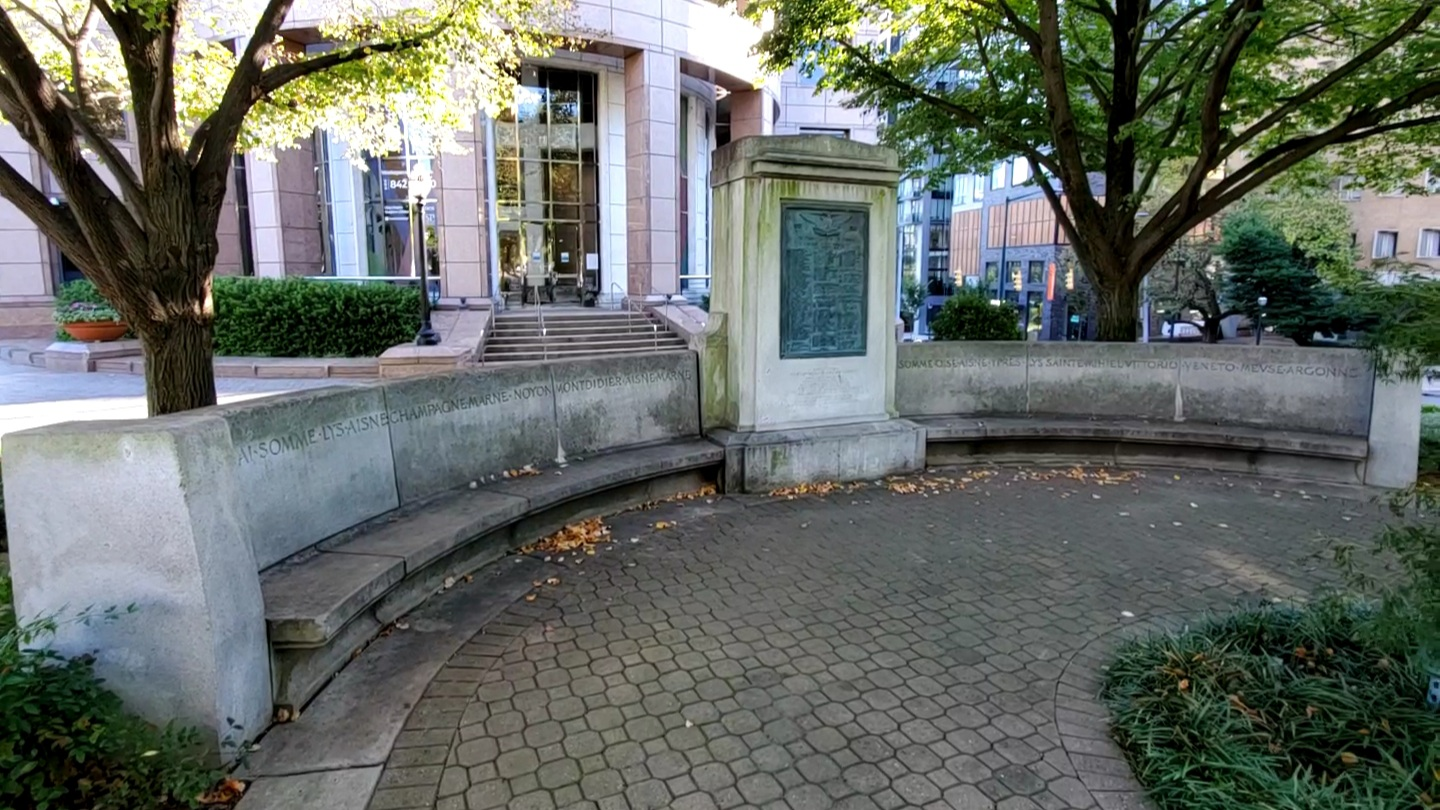
World War I Memorial

=== World War I Memorial ===
The creation of the park was tied to efforts by the American War Mothers to erect a memorial to fallen soldiers from Fulton County, Georgia who had died in World War I. The location selected for the memorial was a triangular tract of land located at the intersection of Peachtree Street and West Peachtree Street, two major thoroughfares in Atlanta. The memorial was dedicated in 1920 in a large ceremony that attracted over 3,000 spectators. Georgia Governor Hugh Dorsey read a list of the 130 residents of Fulton County who had died in the war, whose names were engraved in the granite memorial. This memorial, located near the base of the triangle, was flanked on either side by granite benches that had the names of several major battles of World War I engraved on them. The park itself was named after General of the Armies John J. Pershing, who had led the American Expeditionary Forces during the war. The dedication ceremony, headed by Atlanta Mayor James L. Key, included prayers and speeches from priests from All Saints' Episcopal Church, Central Presbyterian Church, and North Avenue Presbyterian Church.

In 1927, during a visit to the city, Charles Lindbergh visited the memorial, where he placed a wreath.

=== World Athletes Monument and renovation ===
In the 1990s, in the leadup to the 1996 Summer Olympics, another monument was erected at Pershing Point, on the other side of the intersection from the memorial. The monument, called the World Athletes Monument, was funded by Charles, Prince of Wales and stands 55 feet (17 m) tall. In 1997, the Atlanta City Council renamed this plaza across from the park Princess Diana Memorial Plaza following the death of Diana, Princess of Wales.

In early 2013, renovations were started on the park that included extensive pruning, landscaping, and restoration on the memorial. These renovations were completed the following year. Following these restorations, the memorial was rededicated on the one hundredth anniversary of the assassination of Archduke Franz Ferdinand, which triggered World War I. Governor Nathan Deal was a guest speaker at the ceremony.

== See also ==
- List of things named after John J. Pershing
- Parks in Atlanta
