= World Athletes Monument =

Monument in Atlanta, Georgia, United States

- Interactive map of World Athletes Monument
- Coordinates: 33.793349°N 84.386487°W
- Completion date: 1996

The World Athletes Monument, more commonly known as the Prince Charles Monument or Prince of Wales Monument, is a monument located in Atlanta, Georgia, United States. The monument, dedicated to the 1996 Summer Olympics, is a gift from the Prince of Wales. The monument is located on Peachtree Street, at Pershing Point, in Midtown Atlanta.

== Monument ==
The statue is carved in Indiana limestone topped by bronze statues, and stands 55 feet (17 m) tall. It has a conical base circled by five stone bands which have two aedicules on the Peachtree Street axis, within which are plaques honoring the patrons who built the building. Above the base is a tholos circled by five Doric columns, representing the five continents, which support five bronze Atlases who together carry a globe. A cauldron is within the tholos and emits a fire evoking the Olympic torch. Taking advantage of the avenue being straight for a number of blocks, which is unusual in Atlanta, the monument was intentionally aligned with the tower of the 19th-century Gothic Peachtree Christian Church a few blocks away.

== History ==
The Prince of Wales's Institute of Architecture held an international competition for the design of the monument. The competition was won by Anton Glikin, a St. Petersburg, Russia architect and Institute student. The land was donated by the Georgia Department of Transportation. With the lead donation from the Randall family of Atlanta, construction began. The monument was dedicated during the Centennial Olympic Games by Lord Morris of Castle Morris representing Queen Elizabeth II.

== Impact ==
On August 31, 1997 Diana, Princess of Wales, was killed in an automobile accident in Paris. During this time, CNN estimated over 20,000 people were drawn to the World Athletes Monument to grieve and pay their respects. The Atlanta City Council dedicated the space as the Prince of Wales’s Monument at Princess Diana Square.

On June 5, 2004, President Ronald Reagan died and once again thousands of people congregated around the World Athletes Monument to grieve. The monument was enshrouded with flags, candles, flowers and other mementos. It has also become a gathering place for sports victories and other civic uses the citizens of Atlanta choose to celebrate.
