= Autoeater =

Public sculpture in Atlanta, Georgia

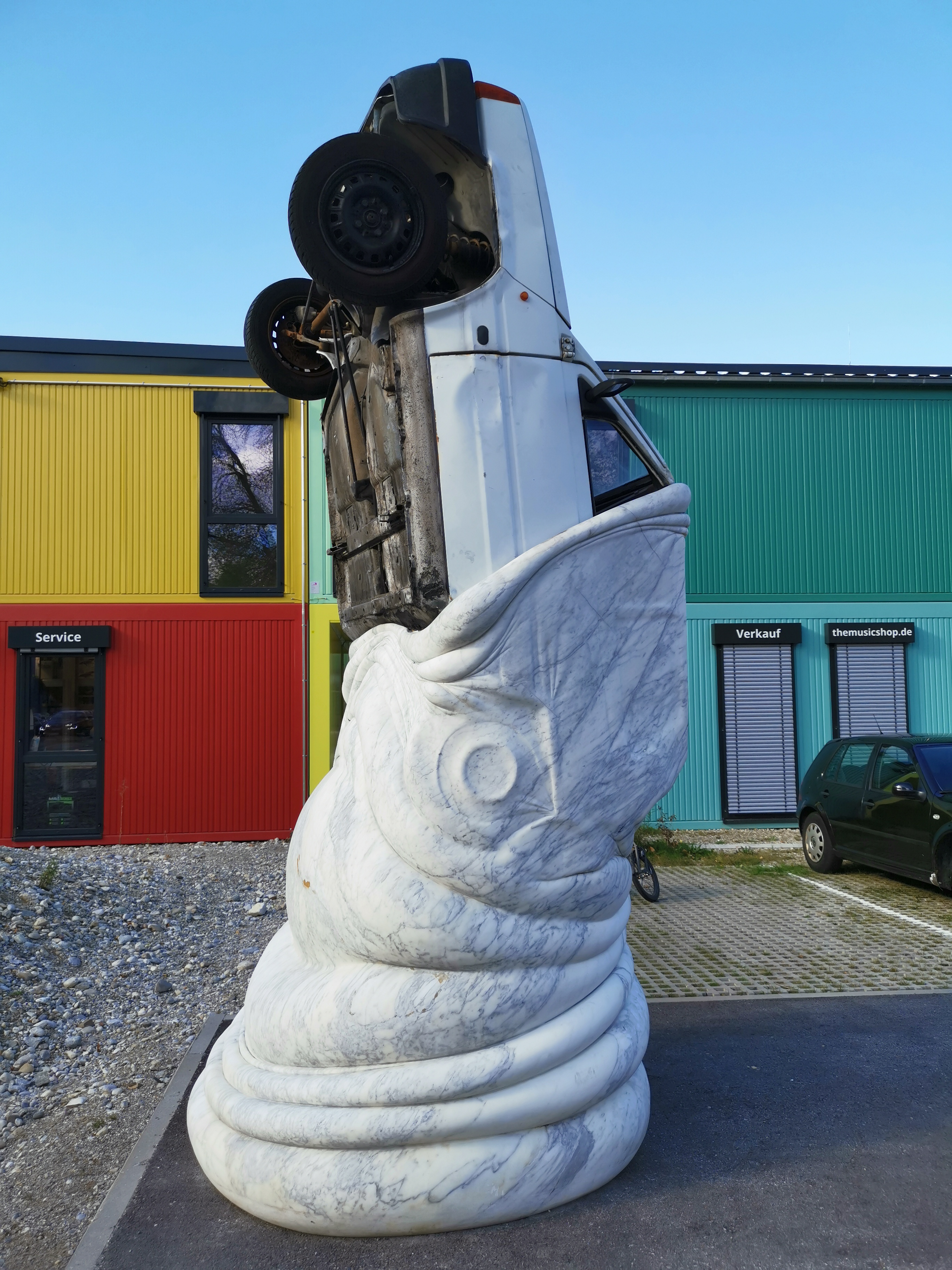
- Autoeater on display in Munich, 2021
- Artist: Julia Venske; Gregor Spänle
- Completion date: June 30, 2017
- Medium: Carrara marble
- Weight: 32,000 pounds (15,000 kg)
- Location: Atlanta, Georgia, United States
- 33°46′54.5″N 84°23′2″W

Autoeater is a large public sculpture previously located in Atlanta, Georgia, United States. The sculpture was unveiled in 2017.

== History ==
In 2017, Midtown Alliance (a coalition of business and civic leaders in Atlanta) announced that Rockspinner, a 22,000-pound (10,000 kg) sculpture at the intersection of Peachtree Street and 10th Street in Midtown Atlanta, would be removed on April 3, to be relocated to another city. Earlier in the year, the alliance took bids for a sculpture that would replace Rockspinner, planning to debut the new piece in the summer. Several months later, on June 30, a replacement sculpture was installed called Autoeater. The sculpture, carved from Carrara marble, depicts a Fiat Panda being consumed by a distorted creature. The sculpture, which weighs 32,000 pounds (15,000 kg), was designed by Julia Venske and Gregor Spänle and created in Italy, being shipped to Atlanta from a marble quarry near Tuscany after its completion. Discussing the thought behind the sculpture, Venske said, "For us, [Atlanta's] a lot of the traffic and it's a lot about the forest. But the traffic is just really obvious." A statement by the Midtown Alliance claims the sculpture "invites comment on Atlanta's relationship with the automobile in the context of one of the city's most walkable urban districts." A 2020 article in The Atlanta Journal-Constitution claims the piece "also has a suggestive sexual connotation, as if the car — symbol of capitalist might upended to reveal its rarely seen undercarriage — is being enveloped in an enormous prophylactic." The sculpture was slated for removal in summer 2020, though the COVID-19 pandemic has caused a delay in its removal. The sculpture was removed in 2021.
