= Richard MacDonald =

American artist

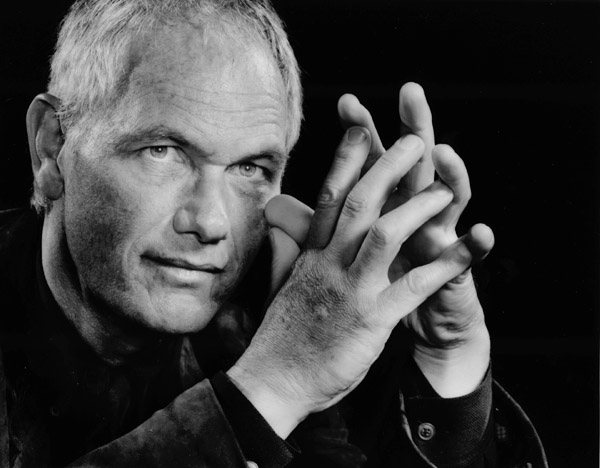
- Richard MacDonald
- Born: 1946 (age 79–80); Pasadena, California
- Known for: Sculpture
- Notable work: Momentum, 100th Anniversary, U.S. Open at Pebble Beach; The Flair, Georgia World Congress Center, Atlanta, Georgia
- Movement: Neo-figurative art, Realism

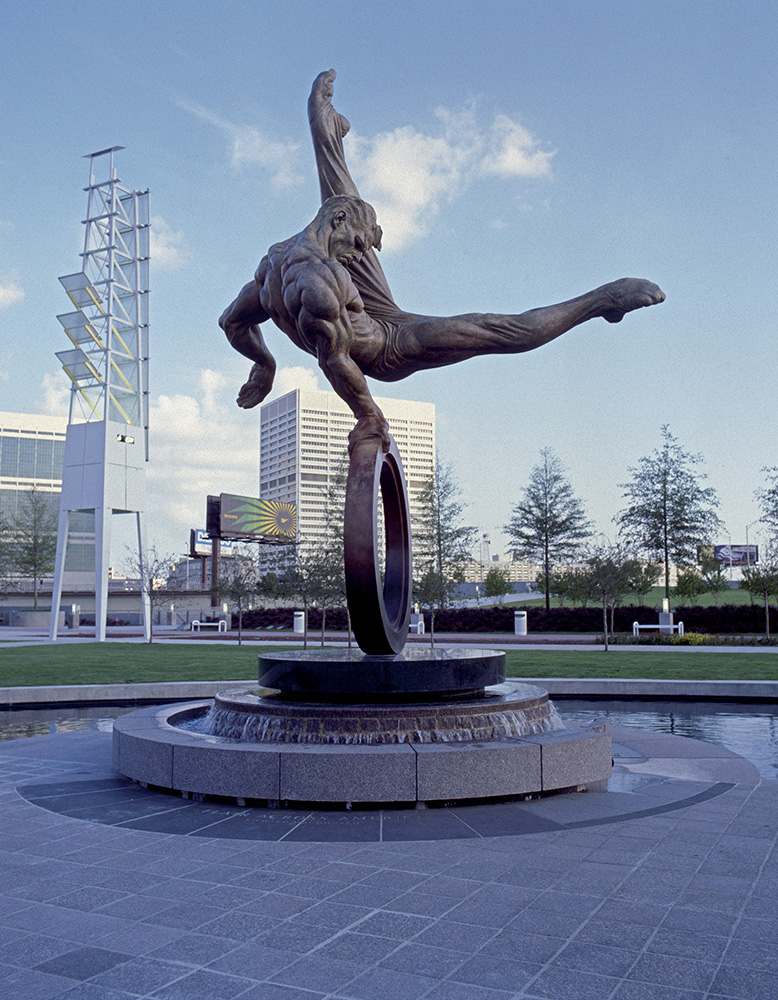
The Flair

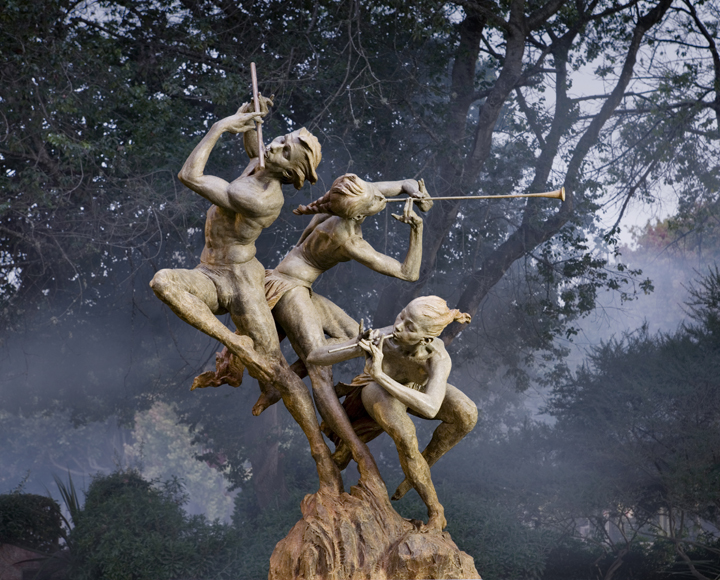
Joie de Vivre

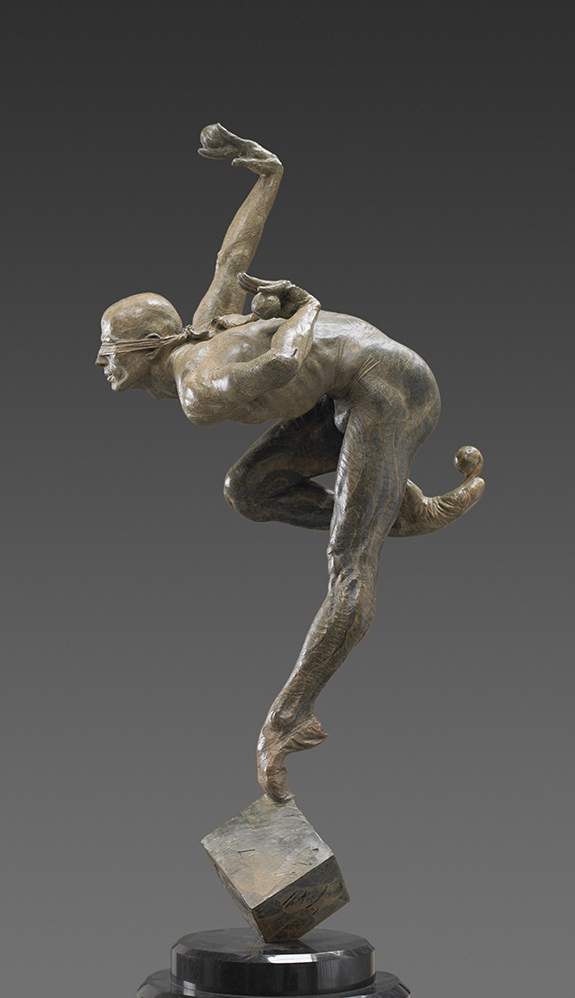
Blind Faith

Richard MacDonald (born 1946) is a California-based contemporary figurative artist known for his bronze sculptures and his association with Cirque Du Soleil.

== Career ==
Educated in painting and illustration at the Art Center College of Design, MacDonald was successful as a commercial illustrator until his late thirties when a fire destroyed his studio, along with the accumulated works of his career as painter and illustrator. Subsequently, he began sculpting in earnest and within ten years became one of the most collected present-day figurative sculptors in America. His work has been acquired for the permanent collections of corporations such as AT&T, IBM, and Anheuser-Busch, as well as notable private collections. His work has been described as "paying tribute to the eloquence of the human form." He is an advocate of neo-realism and figurative art, and has fostered emerging and professional artists through annual international Masters Workshops.

== Method ==
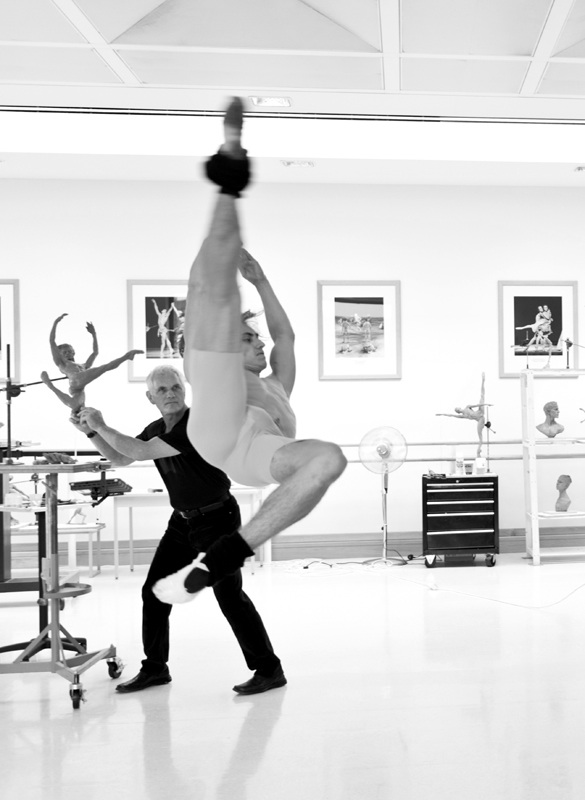
Artist in London Studio sculpting dancer Sergei Polunin

MacDonald's work portrays "the beauty of the human body and the spirit that drives it." He works consistently with models throughout the process of creating a sculpture, often celebrated dancers, performers, and athletes. MacDonald draws and sculpts his subjects over and over, often requiring models to repeat a specific dance move or spontaneous gesture. This may include small, quick sketches or "maquette" in an oil-base plasticine clay. Using the "lost wax" method, MacDonald cast the works of art into bronze. Using an artist method of patina, MacDonald alters the surface color of the final composition. The completed patinated bronze is affixed to a marble base, also designed and selected by the artist as part of the overall sculptural composition.

== Monuments ==
=== The Flair ===
For the 1996 Summer Olympics, MacDonald created The Flair, a 26-foot-tall sculpture of a gymnast. As with all the monuments he completed, MacDonald designed the plaza on which The Flair sits, including a large reflective pool and fountain.

=== Momentum ===
Momentum is a 15-foot-tall, 10,000-pound sculpture sitting atop a 22,000-pound granite base, installed at the Peter Hay Golf Course in Pebble Beach, California to commemorate the 100th U.S. Open Golf Championship. The sculpture accurately portrays the mechanics of an ideal golfer swing. The granite base features the names of the first 100 winners of the U.S. Open. The reverse side provides space for the next hundred winners.

=== The Grand Coda ===
MacDonald started work on The Grand Coda, in late 2008, early 2009, a memorial to Dame Ninette de Valois, founder of The Royal Ballet and The Royal Ballet School. The monument was to be installed at White Lodge in Richmond Park, London, England, a historic royal retreat that is now home to The Royal Ballet School.

=== Additional commissions ===
Additional monument commissions include: Rain, City of Concord, California, 1992; Secretary of State William H. Seward, Z. J. Loussac Public Library, Anchorage, Alaska, 1990; Architectonica, MGM Film Group, Inc., MGM Corporate Center, 1987; Stephen F. Austin, Texas Susquicentennial, Stephen F. Austin University, Austin, Texas, 1986; and The Gymnast, permanent collection of The National Art Museum of Sport, 1986.

== Sources ==
- Richard MacDonald, 1999, Gardner Lithograph Press ISBN 0-9673425-0-3
- City of Art, Kansas City’s Public Art, 2001
- International Encyclopedia Dictionary of Modern and Contemporary Art, 2000-2001
- New Mexico Millennium Collection, 2002
