= Cheshire Bridge Road =

Street in Atlanta, Georgia, US

- Length: 1.55 mi (2.49 km)
- Location: Atlanta
- South end: Piedmont Avenue / Piedmont Road / Piedmont Circle
- Major junctions: SR 236 (Lindbergh Drive / Lavista Road); I-85 (Northeast Expressway / SR 403)
- North end: Lenox Road

Cheshire Bridge Road is a mainly north–south thoroughfare of Atlanta, Georgia, USA traversing the Morningside-Lenox Park and Lindridge-Martin Manor neighborhoods from Piedmont Avenue to Buford Highway just north of Interstate 85.

While the corridor was originally settled during the 1800s, it was not until the 1950s and 1960s that it rapidly developed as a commercial center dominated by strip malls. Following the massive white flight from Intown Atlanta during the 1970s due to increased desegregation, the corridor became well known for various types of adult entertainment such as sex shops, strip clubs, gay circuit parties, and gay nightclubs that had moved into its abandoned retail spaces. The area has been noted as a landmark in the LGBT history of Georgia.

Since the 2000s, urban redevelopment projects and gentrification have challenged the legacy of the area. In 2005, the Atlanta City Council banned new adult businesses from opening on Cheshire Bridge Road but existing ones were allowed to stay. However, new high-density residential developments have become more common in recent years in the area which pressured some of those existing adult businesses and nightclubs to close or relocate.

== History ==
=== Origins ===
White settlers originally settled the corridor in the 1820s. Two of these early settlers were Napoleon and Jerome Cheshire, two brothers who owned farms on opposite sides of South Fork of Peachtree Creek, and connected their farms by a bridge known as the Cheshire Bridge, giving the road its name.

The area remained agricultural until the early 20th century. At that time suburban development encroached from Atlanta to the south, in today's Morningside neighborhood. By the 1960s the entire area was suburban.

=== Possible "cleanup" of Cheshire Bridge ===
In 2005, the city banned new adult businesses on Cheshire Bridge, but existing ones were allowed to stay.

In 2013, councilman Alex Wan introduced legislation, supported by neighborhood associations and NPU F, to remove existing adult businesses from Cheshire Bridge by 2018, but this was not passed, opposed by a mix of gays, strippers and Atlanta's real estate interests – including Scott Selig. Some in the gay community wondered if Cheshire Bridge were "sanitized", "where would people go for sexual expression"? Matthew Cardinale, the editor and publisher of Atlanta Progressive News, and a resident of the Road, decried "the ongoing project of gentrification, homogenization, sterilization and capitalization of a historic neighborhood", Atlanta's "red-light district".

By 2020, several prominent adult entertainment businesses and gay nightclubs were pressured to close or relocate to make the area more palatable for Atlanta residents and investors seeking to make it more residential and family friendly. However, some area business owners and Atlanta residents have organized to try to preserve the legacy of Cheshire Bridge Road.

== Businesses ==
Well known current and former businesses along Cheshire Bridge Road include:

- Tokyo Valentino Erotique (formerly Inserection) - a sex shop
- Allure, Onyx, Bliss, and Doll House - straight strip clubs
- The Chamber - a BDSM and burlesque centric straight nightclub
- Cheshire Motor Inn - a motel famous for gay cruising
- The Colonnade restaurant - a popular restaurant among "gays and grays"
- Roxx Taven - a popular restaurant among gays
- Bliss Atlanta - a gay strip club
- B.J. Roosters, Xion, The Heretic and The Jungle - gay nightclubs
- The Den - a men only private sex club

== Amenities ==
- Cheshire Farm Trail along South Fork Peachtree Creek
