= Cheshire Farm Trail =

Walking trail in Atlanta, Georgia, U.S.

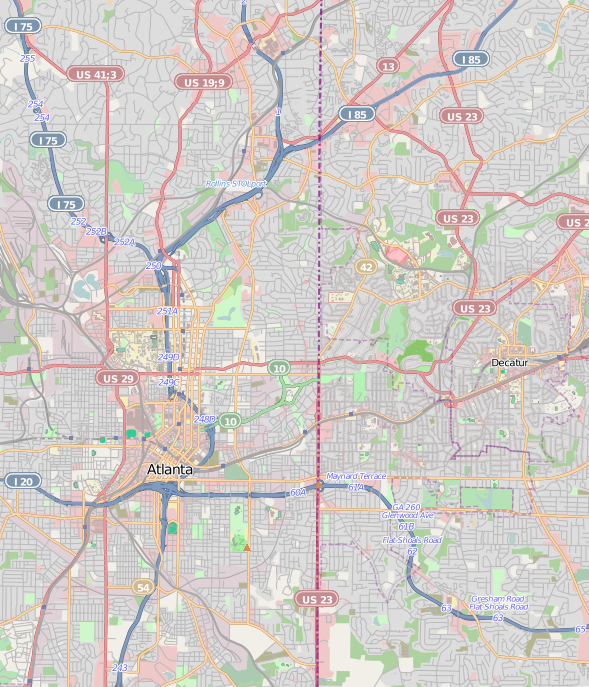
Location of the trailheads in Intown Atlanta

The Cheshire Farm Trail is a walking trail along the South Fork of Peachtree Creek in Atlanta. The trail was completed in 2014 and opened to the public after a ribbon cutting ceremony on September 23, 2014.

The trail cost about $1 million, and was funded by the Georgia Department of Transportation to appease local residents who were unhappy about the construction of a flyover for the Georgia 400/I-85 interchange.

The trail is named for Hezekiel Cheshire, a captain in the War of 1812 who lived and farmed in the area and built a farmhouse near the location of the current trailhead. Cheshire was part of the Cheshire family, after whom Cheshire Bridge Road is named.
