= Flair Across America =

Bronze sculpture in Atlanta, Georgia

Coordinates: 33.7572°N 84.3985°W

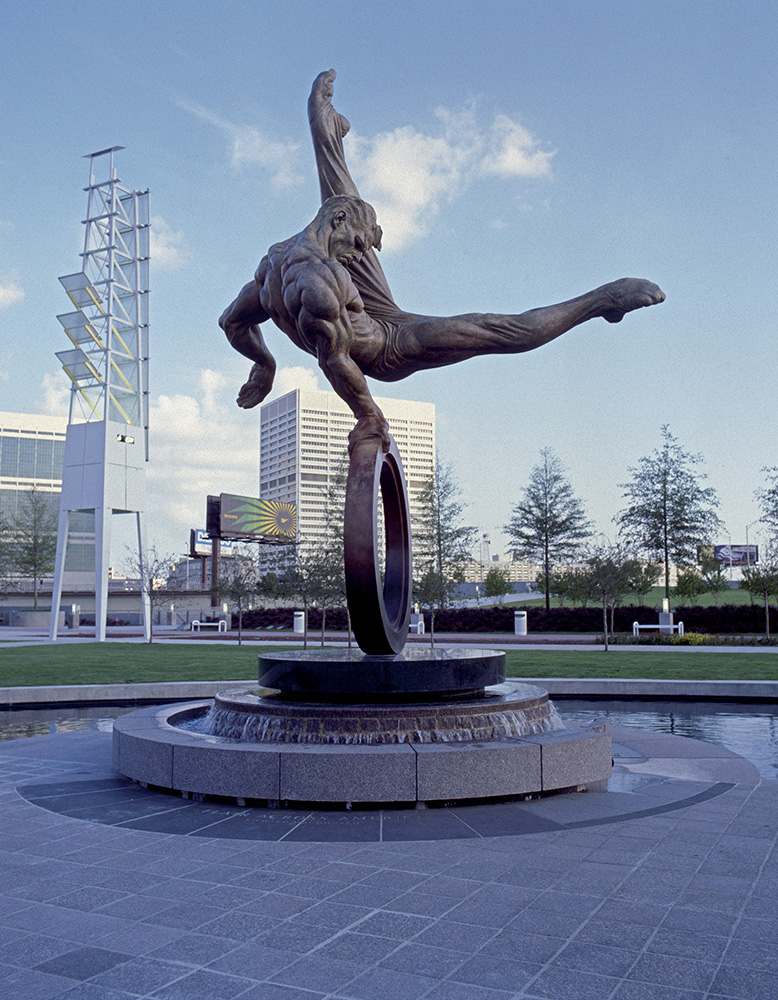
Flair Across America

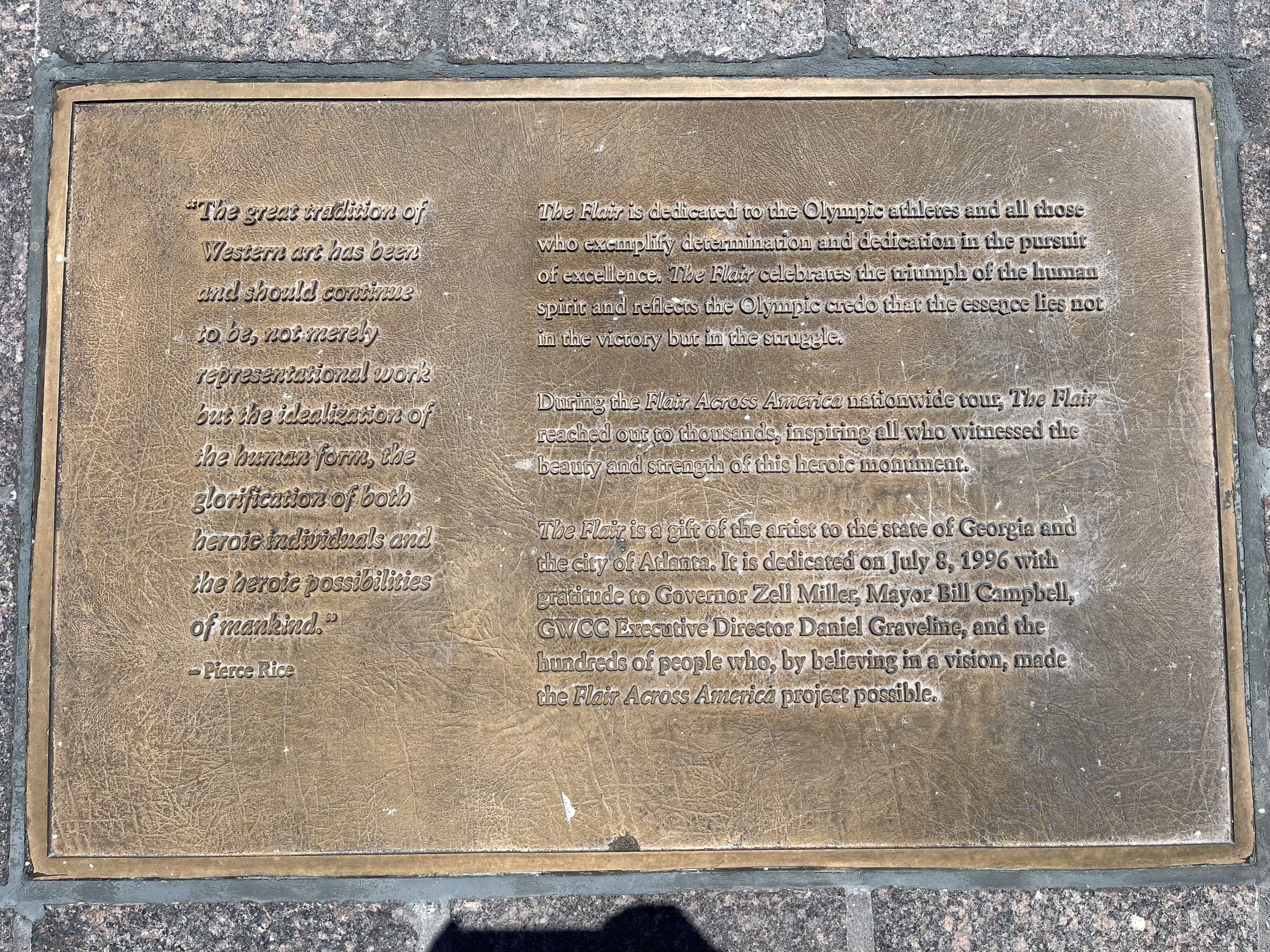
Plaque adorning the Flair Across America statue

Flair Across America is a bronze statue in Georgia International Plaza in Atlanta, Georgia by artist Richard MacDonald finished in 1996 before the 1996 Summer Olympics. It is located near the site of the former Georgia Dome in the Georgia World Congress Center complex.

The sculpture is dedicated to the Olympic athletes and to "all those who exemplify determination and dedication in the pursuit of excellence".

The dedication appears on a plaque accompanying the statue, which also includes a quote by the author Pierce Rice:

The great tradition of western art has been and should continue to be not merely representational work but the idealization of the human form, the glorification of both heroic individuals and the heroic possibilities of mankind.

The sculpture has been variously referred to as The Flair, Flair Across America, and Flair Across America: The Gymnast in different publications over the years. Prior to its installation in Atlanta, it traveled the United States on a multi-city tour. It was a gift of MacDonald to the state and to the city. It was dedicated on July 8, 1996.
