= Alexi Torres =

Cuban artist (born 1976)

- Born: Alexi Torres; September 27, 1976 (age 49); Bermeja, Matanzas, Cuba
- Occupation: Artist
- Website: alexitorres.com

Alexi Torres is an artist from Cuba. He is known for his oil paintings that are painted to appear as if knitted and woven. His artistic inspiration is derived from everyday, organic objects, such as leaves, feathers, basket weavings, and cloth. It is driven by a love of nature and his dedication to perfecting a unique technique of oil painting.

Inspired by his upbringing, Torres views the art making process as planting an idea and harvesting it. He builds the stretchers, stretches the canvases, and primes them himself. As his ancestors did during the harvest, he starts and finishes each work following the cycle of the waning moon.

Alexi Torres was born in 1976 in Matanzas, Cuba. He attended the Elemental School of Art in Matanzas, Cuba (1989-1991) and the National School of Arts in Havana, Cuba (1991-1995.) He has had solo exhibitions around the world. His work has also been featured in several group exhibitions and held in the collections of famous figures, such as Will Smith. In fact, in the ABC special from November 19, 2013 featuring magician, David Blaine, Jada Pinkett Smith and the whole family are standing in front of the painting, ReAmerica, while Will Smith, David Blaine, and Jada are performing the illusion.

Torres currently lives and works in Georgia and Zancudo, Costa Rica. He has shown his work at several art fairs including the Miami International Art Fair, Scope Art Fair, Arthamptons, Art Southamptons, Aspen Fine Art Fair, Palm Beach Art Fair, San Francisco Fine Art Fair, Art Palm Springs, and the Houston Fine Art Fair. He is represented by Contessa Gallery.

== Works ==
Torres' painting Reamerica depicts an American flag with a selection of objects, brands and symbols made of basket weaving. Redream shows a young couple resting on a flag mattress. Lucky Bill is a twelve foot long two dollar bill. Like many of his other pieces, they are painted in a basket weaving design.

His most recent bodies of work are two series We Buy Gold (2013) and We Buy Silver. (2013) The titles of these series were inspired by signs seen by the artist that proclaim "We Buy Gold" and "We Buy Silver." The paintings included present the faces of artists and other historical figures on the faces of coins. They commemorate these celebrated individuals and honor the value of their contributions to the world. They are propositions to use money to buy values. The artist painted portraits of the artist and not the works to encourage others to treasure the human soul more than his or her works.
