= Georgia International Plaza =

Rooftop green space in Atlanta, Georgia

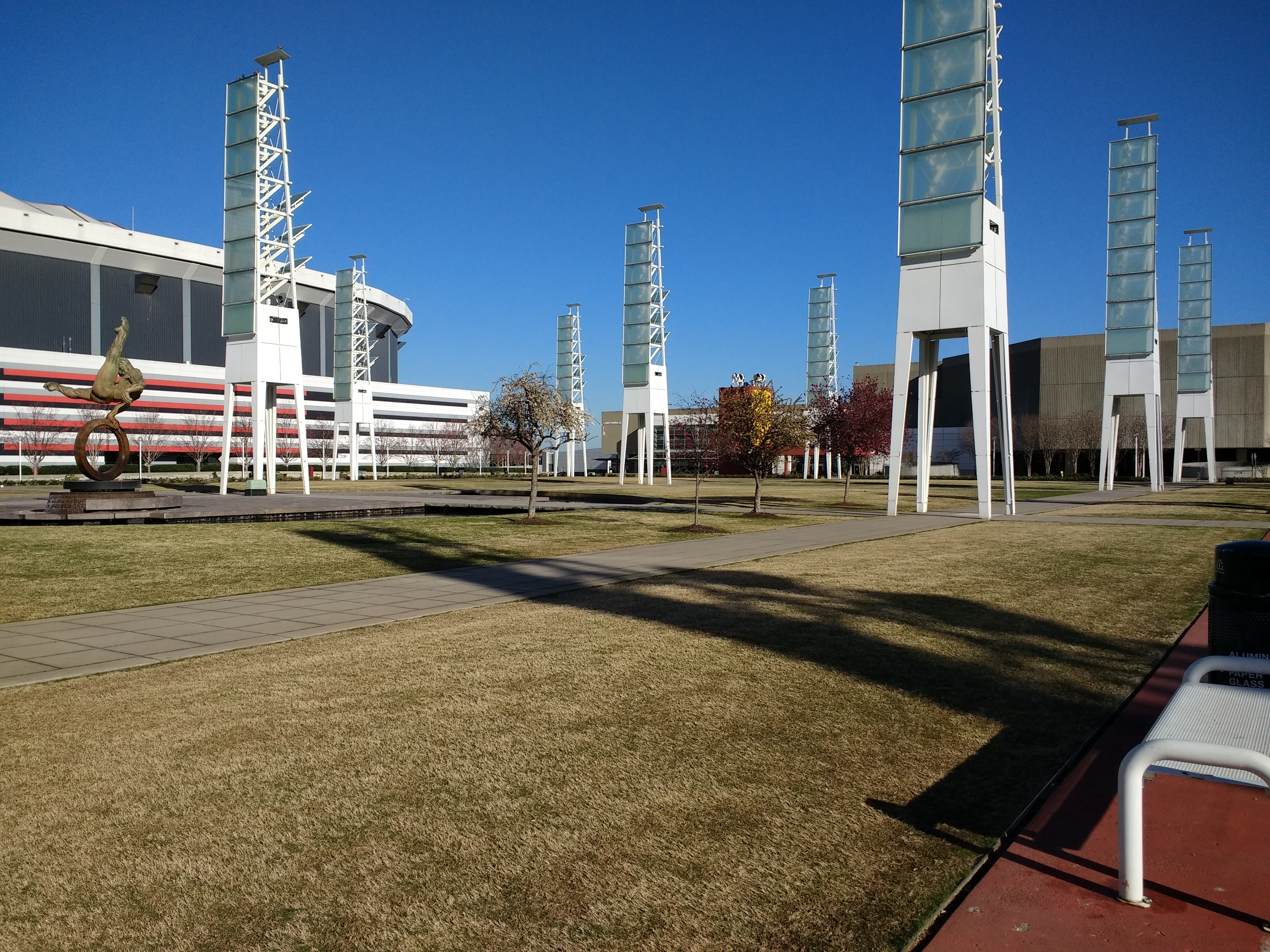
- The plaza in 2017

- Location within Atlanta
- Type: Community park
- Location: Downtown, Atlanta, Georgia, US
- Coordinates: 33.7573°N 84.3986°W
- Area: 6-acre (2.4 ha)
- Opened: June 1996
- Owner: Georgia World Congress Center Authority

Georgia International Plaza is a 6-acre (24,000 m^{2}) green space atop a 2,000-space parking garage in Downtown Atlanta, between the Mercedes-Benz Stadium in the southwest, the Georgia World Congress Center in the north, and State Farm Arena in the east. It was built to link these three sites. In March 1994, the Georgia General Assembly approved that $28 million could go towards building the park. It opened in June 1996 to coincide with the 1996 Summer Olympics being held in Atlanta. It has been proposed that the park be used as an entertainment venue.

The sculpture Flair Across America is located in the plaza.

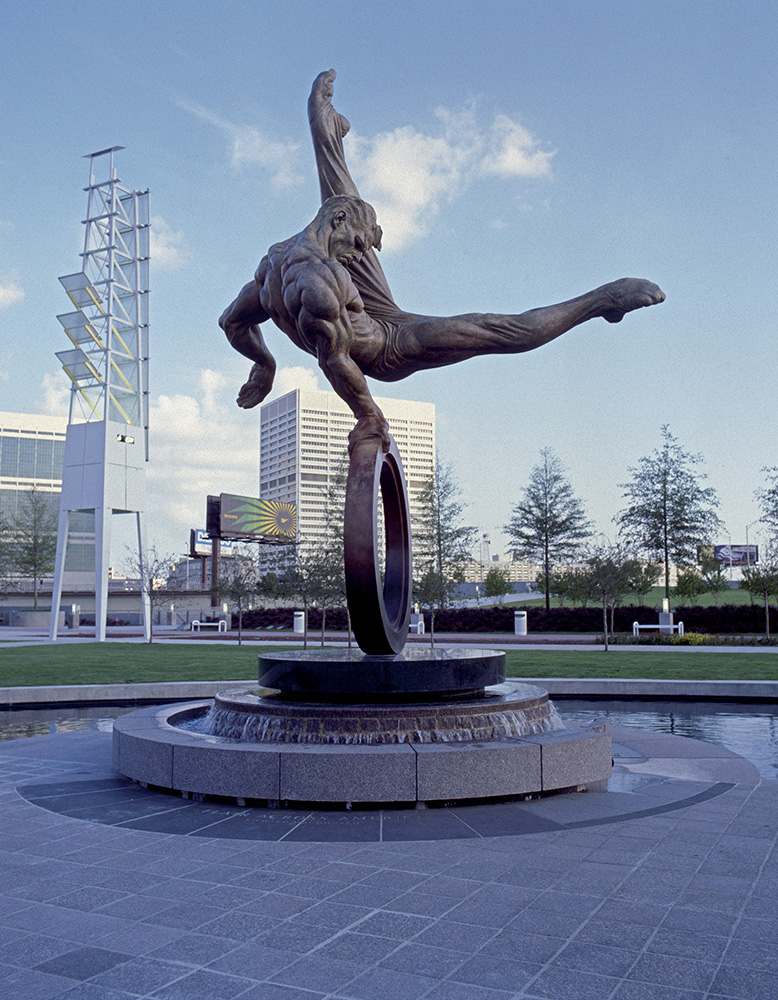
Flair Across America

== See also ==
- Flair Across America
- Centennial Olympic Park, another park constructed for the 1996 Summer Olympics
