= The Shade (sculpture) =

Sculpture by Auguste Rodin

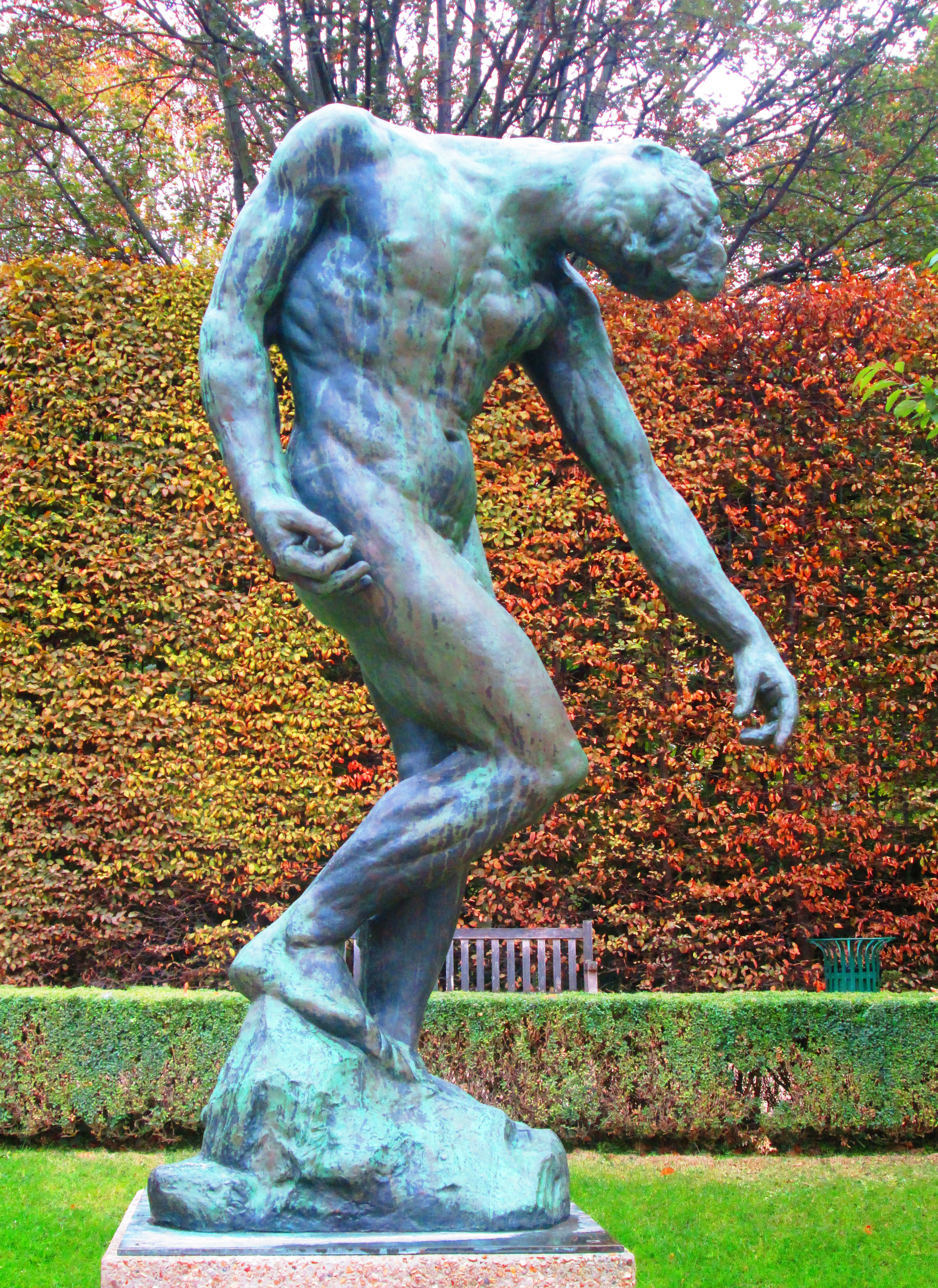
- full-size version in the garden of the Musée Rodin, cast in 1946 by Alexis Rudier from the 1904 model
- Artist: Auguste Rodin
- Year: c.1880 (conception)
- Medium: plaster / bronze

The Shade, The Slave or The Titan is a sculpture by the French artist Auguste Rodin.

== Evolution ==
The sculpture was conceived around 1880 and used in triplicate as a part of the artist's large-scale work The Gates of Hell. It evolved into both the full size sculpture The Three Shades, and a separate sculpture of a single figure, The Shade.

The original individual figure had no right hand - Rodin had Josef Maratka add one in 1904 for both the individual figure and The Three Shades.

== See also ==
- List of sculptures by Auguste Rodin
