= Georgia Tech =

Public university in Atlanta, Georgia, US

Georgia Institute of Technology
- Former name: Georgia School of Technology (1885–1948)
- Motto: "Progress and Service"
- Type: Public research university
- Established: October 13, 1885; 141 years ago
- Parent institution: University System of Georgia
- Accreditation: SACS
- Academic affiliations: AAU; GRA; ORAU; UARC; URA; Space-grant
- Endowment: $3.51 billion (2025)
- Budget: $2.74 billion (2024)
- President: Tim Lieuwen (interim)
- Provost: Raheem Beyah
- Faculty: 1,371 (2025)
- Administrative staff: 114 (2025)
- Students: 56,715 (Fall 2025)
- Undergraduates: 21,028 (Fall 2025)
- Postgraduates: 31,436 (Fall 2025)
- Doctoral students: 4,083 (Fall 2025)
- Other students: Special Graduate: 168 (Fall 2025)
- Location: Atlanta, Georgia, United States; 33.776°N 84.396°W
- Campus: 426 acres (1.72 km^{2}); Large city
- Other campuses: Savannah; Metz
- Newspaper: Technique
- Colors: White & Gold
- Nickname: Yellow Jackets
- Sporting affiliations: NCAA Division I FBS – ACC
- Mascots: Buzz; Ramblin' Wreck
- Website: gatech.edu

The Georgia Institute of Technology (commonly referred to as Georgia Tech, GT, and simply Tech or the Institute) is a public research university and institute of technology in Atlanta, Georgia, United States. Established in 1885, it has the largest student enrollment of the University System of Georgia, with satellite campuses in Savannah, Georgia, and Metz, France.

The school was founded as the Georgia School of Technology as part of New South efforts to build an industrial economy in the Southern United States after the Civil War. Initially, it offered only a degree in mechanical engineering. By 1901, its curriculum had expanded to include electrical, civil, and chemical engineering. In 1948, the school changed its name to reflect its evolution from a trade school to a technical institute and research university. Georgia Tech is organized into seven colleges with about 30 departments and academic units. It emphasizes the academic fields of science and technology. Georgia Tech's $5.8 billion economic impact for fiscal year 2024 led all public institutions in the state.

Georgia Tech fields eight men's and seven women's sports teams; these compete in NCAA Division I athletics and have won five national championships. The university is a member of the Atlantic Coast Conference.

== History ==
=== Establishment ===
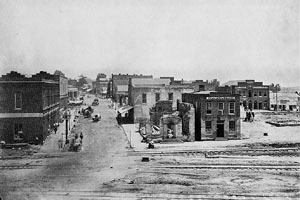
Atlanta during the Civil War, c. 1864

The idea of a technology school in Georgia was introduced in 1865 during the Reconstruction period. Two former Confederate officers, Major John Fletcher Hanson (an industrialist) and Nathaniel Edwin Harris (a politician and eventually governor of Georgia), who had become prominent citizens in the town of Macon, Georgia, after the Civil War, believed that the South needed to improve its technology to compete with the North's industrialization. Many Southerners at this time agreed with this idea, known as the New South Creed. Because the American South of that era was mainly populated by agricultural workers and technical developments lagged, they proposed establishing a technology school.

In 1882, the Georgia State Legislature authorized a committee, led by Harris, to visit the Northeast to learn how technology schools worked. They were impressed by the polytechnic educational models developed at the Massachusetts Institute of Technology and the Worcester County Free Institute of Industrial Science (now Worcester Polytechnic Institute). The committee recommended adapting the Worcester model, which stressed a combination of "theory and practice," the "practice" component including student employment and production of consumer items to generate revenue for the school.

On October 13, 1885, Georgia Governor Henry D. McDaniel signed the bill to create and fund the new school. In 1887, Atlanta pioneer Richard Peters donated to the state 4 acres (1.6 ha) of the site of a failed garden suburb called Peters Park. The site was bounded on the south by North Avenue and on the west by Cherry Street. He then sold five adjoining acres of land to the state for US$10,000, (equivalent to $360,000 in 2025). This land was near Atlanta's northern city limits at the time of its founding, although the city has since expanded beyond it. A historical marker on the large hill in Central Campus says that the site occupied by the school's first buildings once held fortifications to protect Atlanta during the Atlanta campaign of the American Civil War. The surrender of the city took place in 1864 on what today is the southwestern boundary of the Georgia Tech campus.

=== Early years ===
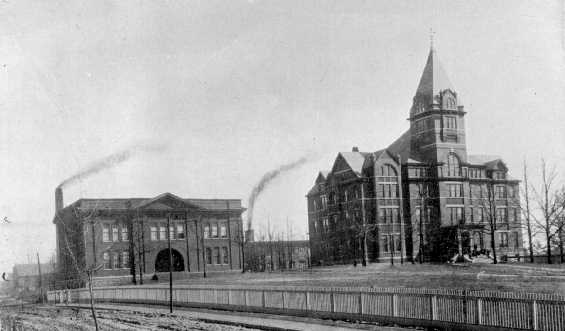
An early picture of Georgia Tech, circa 1899

The Georgia School of Technology opened in the fall of 1888 with two buildings. One building (now Tech Tower, an administrative headquarters) had classrooms to teach students. The second building featured a shop and had a foundry, forge, boiler room, and engine room. It was designed for students to work and produce goods to sell and fund the school. The two buildings were equal in size to show the importance of teaching both the mind and the hands, though, at the time, there was some disagreement as to whether the machine shop should have been used to turn a profit.

Georgia Tech's Evening School of Commerce began holding classes in 1912. The evening school admitted its first female student in 1917, although the state legislature did not officially authorize attendance by women until 1920. Annie T. Wise became the first female graduate in 1919 and was Georgia Tech's first female faculty member the following year. In 1931, the Board of Regents transferred control of the Evening School of Commerce to the University of Georgia (UGA) and moved the civil and electrical engineering courses at UGA to Georgia Tech. Georgia Tech replaced the commerce school with what later became the College of Business. The commerce school would later split from UGA and eventually became Georgia State University. In 1934, the Engineering Experiment Station (later known as the Georgia Tech Research Institute) was founded by W. Harry Vaughan with an initial budget of $5,000 (equivalent to $120,336 in 2025) and 13 part-time faculty. In the 1940s, President Blake Van Leer focused on making Georgia Tech the "MIT of the South." He lobbied government and businesses for funds for new facilities. The Research Building was expanded, and a $300,000 (equivalent to $4,000,000 in 2025) Westinghouse A-C network calculator was given to Georgia Tech by Georgia Power in 1947. A new gymnasium, new textile and architecture buildings, and a $2 million library was completed.

=== Modern history ===
Founded as the Georgia School of Technology, Georgia Tech assumed its present name in 1948 to reflect a growing focus on advanced technological and scientific research.

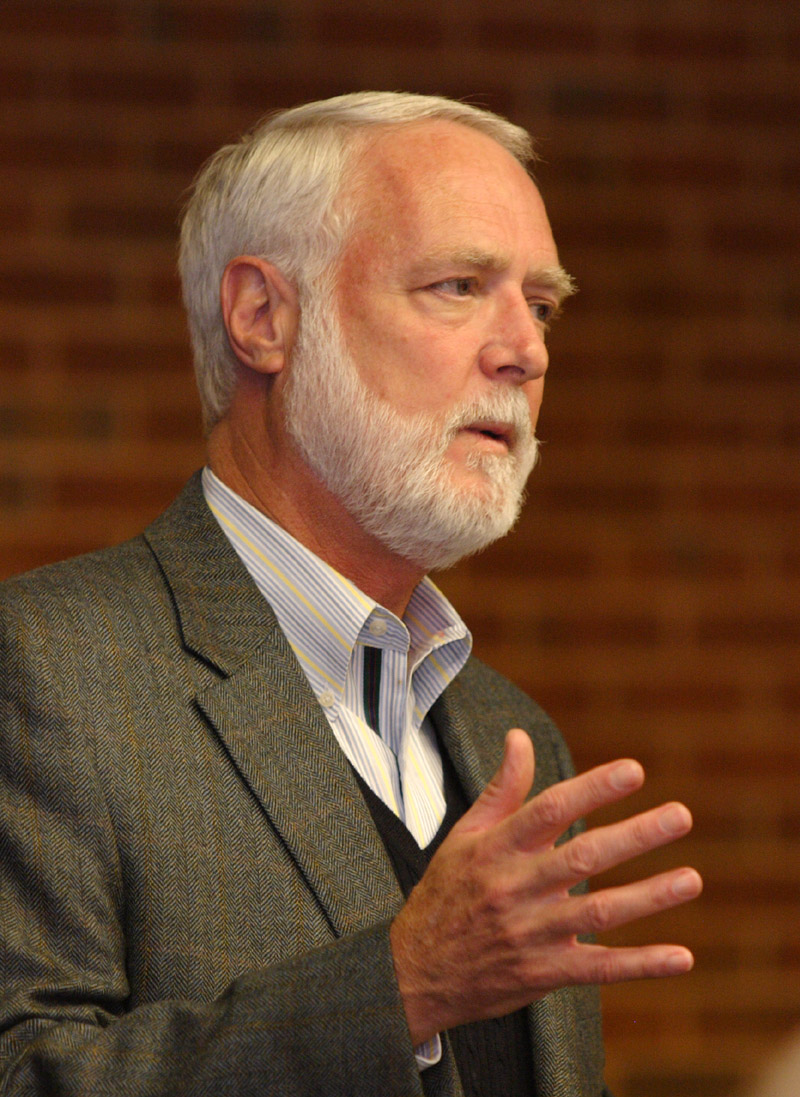
Georgia Tech's 10th president, G. Wayne Clough

During President Blake Ragsdale Van Leer's tenure, Georgia Tech expanded its campus with new facilities, added new engineering courses, and became the largest engineering institute in the South and the third largest in the United States. The first Georgia Tech Ph.D. was awarded in 1950 in electrical engineering. Van Leer also admitted the first female students to regular classes in 1952 and began steps toward racial integration. He stood up to Georgia governor Marvin Griffin's demand to bar Bobby Grier from participating in the 1956 Sugar Bowl game between Georgia Tech and Grier's University of Pittsburgh. After Van Leer's death, his wife, Ella Lillian Wall Van Leer, bought a house on campus and opened it to female students. She also set up the first sorority on campus along with a Society of Women Engineers chapter. In 1968, women could enroll in all programs at Georgia Tech. Industrial Management was the last program to open to women. The first women's dorm, Fulmer Hall, opened in 1969. Rena Faye Smith, appointed as a research assistant in 1969 by R.A. Young in X-ray diffraction, became the first female faculty member (research) in the School of Physics. She went on to earn a Ph.D. at Georgia State University and taught physics and instructional technology at Black Hills State University from 1997 to 2005 as Rena Faye Norby. She served as a Fulbright Scholar in Russia in 2004–2005. By Spring 2009, women constituted 30.3% of the undergraduates and 25.3% of the graduate students.

In 1959, a meeting of 2,741 students voted by an overwhelming majority to endorse integration of qualified applicants, regardless of race. In September 1961, nine months after the University of Georgia's violent integration, Ralph A. Long Jr., Lawrence Williams, and Ford C. Greene enrolled at Georgia Tech, becoming the first African American students at Georgia Tech. Ronald Yancey enrolled the next year and in 1965 became the university's first African American graduate. Georgia Tech became the first university in the Deep South to desegregate without a court order. In the 1967–68 academic year, 28 students out of 7,526 were Black. In 1968, William Peace became the first Black instructor, and Marle Carter became the first Black member of the homecoming court. In 1964, Calvin Huey became the first Black player to play at Grant Field when he took the field for Navy. The first Black person to play for Georgia Tech was Eddie McAshan in 1970.

In 1988, President John Patrick Crecine oversaw a restructuring of the university. Georgia Tech had three colleges at that point: the College of Engineering, the College of Management, and the College of Sciences and Liberal Arts. Crecine reorganized the latter two into the College of Computing; the College of Sciences; and the Ivan Allen College of Management, Policy, and International Affairs. Crecine never asked for input regarding the changes and, consequently, many faculty members disliked his top-down management style; despite this, the changes passed by a slim margin. Crecine was also instrumental in securing the 1996 Summer Olympics for Atlanta. A large amount of construction occurred on campus, since Georgia Tech served as the Olympic Village. The Undergraduate Living Center, Fourth Street Apartments, Sixth Street Apartments, Eighth Street Apartments, Hemphill Apartments (now named Crecine Apartments), and Center Street Apartments were built to house athletes and journalists. The Georgia Tech Aquatic Center was built for swimming events, and the Alexander Memorial Coliseum was renovated. The Institute also built the Kessler Campanile and fountain to serve as a landmark and symbol of the university on television broadcasts.

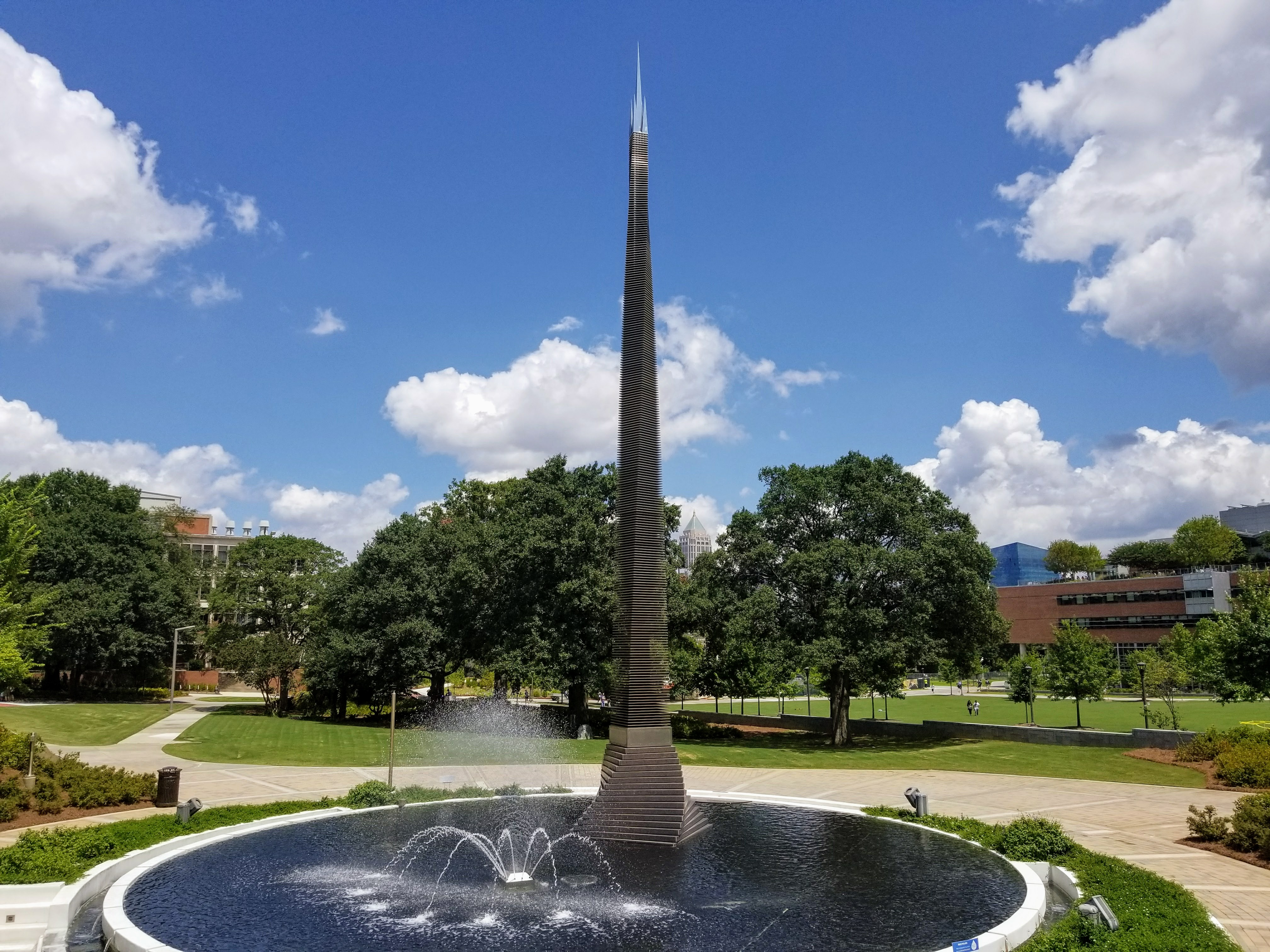
The Kessler Campanile seen from the John Lewis Student Center.

In 1994, G. Wayne Clough became the first Georgia Tech alumnus to serve as the president of the institution. He was in office during the 1996 Summer Olympics. In 1998, he separated the Ivan Allen College of Management, Policy, and International Affairs into the Ivan Allen College of Liberal Arts and returned the College of Management to "College" status (Crecine, the previous president, had demoted Management from "College" to "School" status as part of a controversial 1990 reorganization plan). His tenure focused on a dramatic expansion of the Institute, a revamped Undergraduate Research Opportunities Program, and the creation of an International Plan. On March 15, 2008, he was appointed secretary of the Smithsonian Institution, effective July 1, 2008. Gary Schuster, Georgia Tech's provost and executive vice president for Academic Affairs, was named interim president, effective July 1, 2008.

On April 1, 2009, G. P. "Bud" Peterson, previously the chancellor of the University of Colorado at Boulder, became the 11th president of Georgia Tech. On April 20, 2010, Georgia Tech was invited to join the Association of American Universities, the first new member institution in nine years. In 2014, Georgia Tech launched the first "massive open online degree" in computer science by partnering with Udacity and AT&T. A complete degree through that program cost students $7,000 at the time. It eventually expanded this program with its online master's in analytics in January 2017, as well as providing the option for advanced credits with a MicroMasters in collaboration with edX. Georgia Tech now offers 13 master's programs.

On January 7, 2019, President G.P. Bud Peterson announced his intention to retire. Ángel Cabrera, Georgia Tech alumnus and former president of George Mason University, was named his successor on June 13, 2019. Cabrera took office on September 3, 2019.

== Campus sections ==
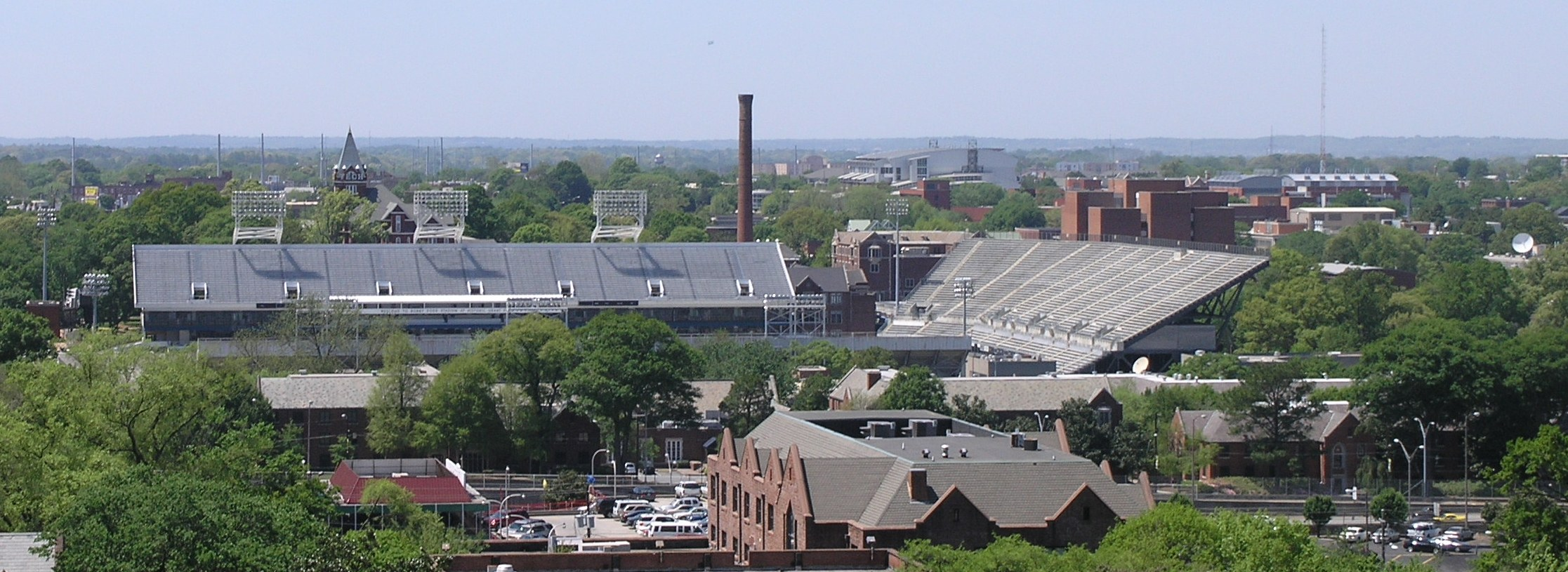
Georgia Tech's East Campus and Central Campus as seen from an elevated point near Peachtree Street and North Avenue.

The Georgia Tech campus is located in Midtown, an area slightly north of downtown Atlanta. The campus offers a mix of tall buildings and greenery. More than 15,000 trees cover nearly 30 percent of the campus. The university has been tree campus-certified since 2008 and a Certified ArbNet Level II Arboretum since 2016. The campus is served by two stations on the MARTA rail system, Midtown and North Avenue.

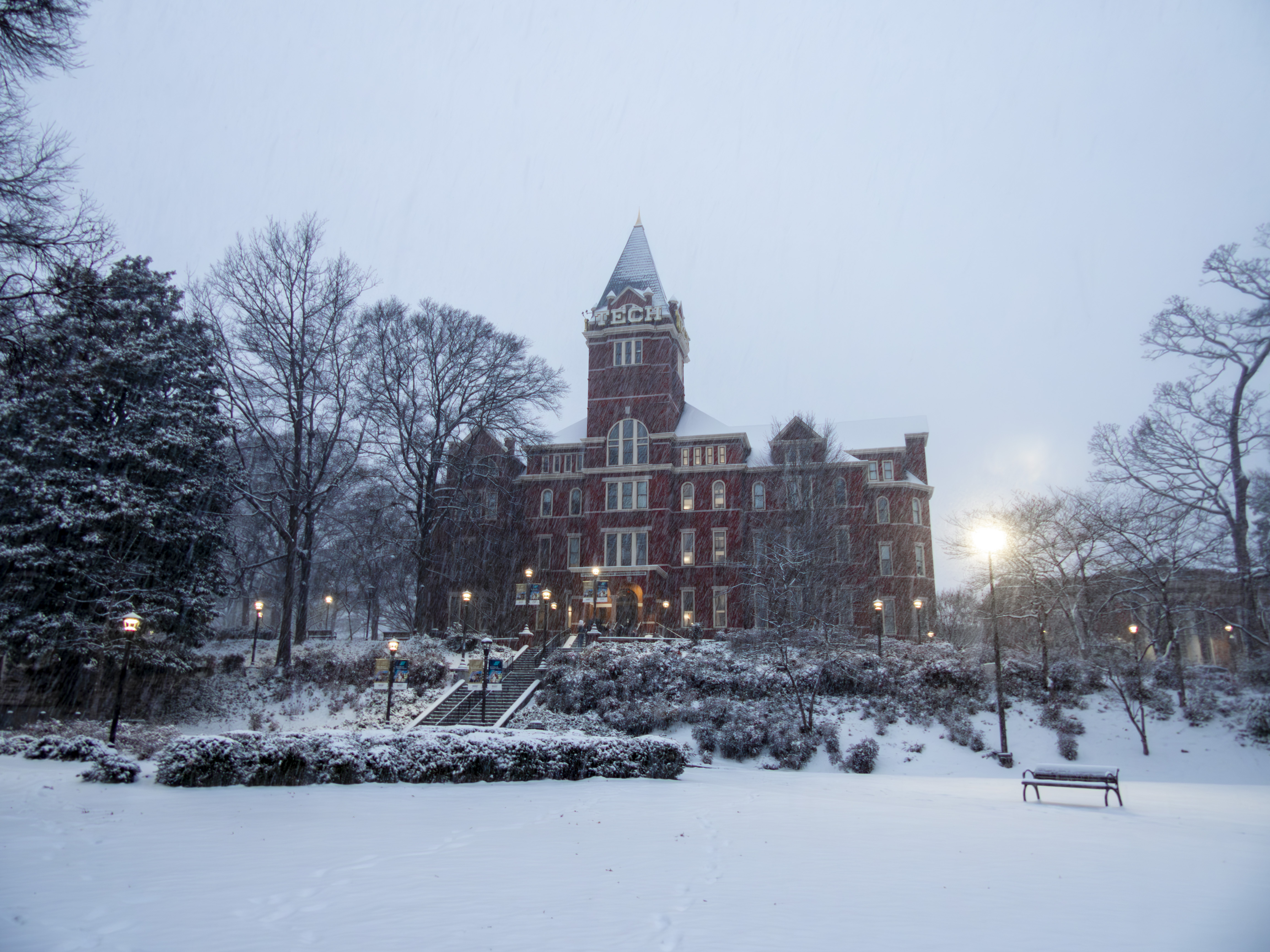
Tech Tower during a rare snow day

The campus is organized into four main parts: West Campus, East Campus, Central Campus, and Technology Square. West Campus and East Campus are both occupied primarily by residence halls, while Central Campus is reserved primarily for teaching and research buildings.

=== West Campus ===
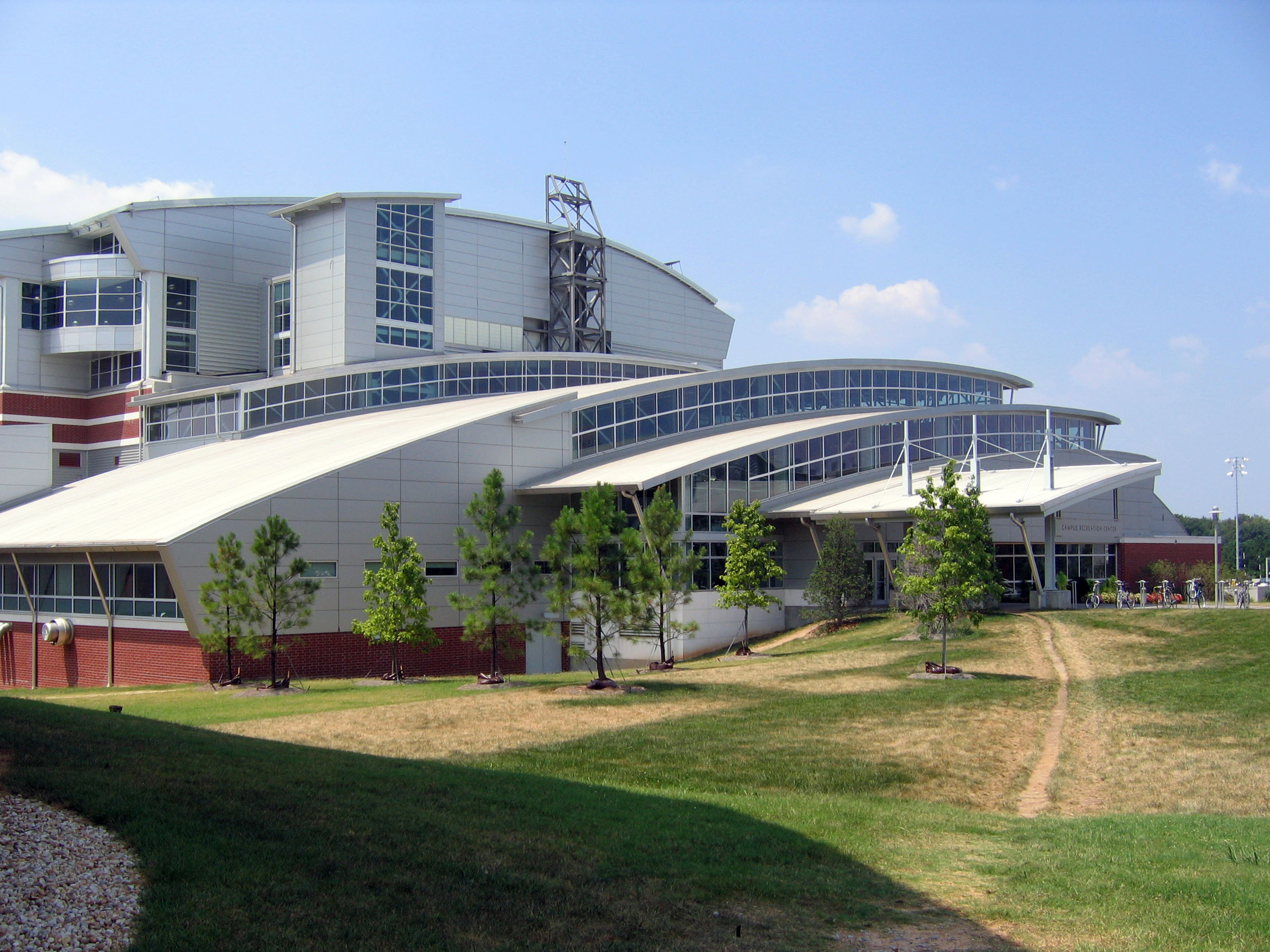
The front of the Georgia Tech Campus Recreation Center

West Campus is occupied primarily by apartments and coed undergraduate dormitories. Apartments include Crecine, Center Street, Sixth Street, Maulding, Graduate Living Center, Eighth Street, Nelson Shell, and Zbar, while dorms include Bud and Val Peterson, Freeman, Montag, Fitten, Folk, Caldwell, Armstrong, Hefner, Fulmer, and Woodruff suites. The Campus Recreation Center (formerly the Student Athletic Complex); a volleyball court; a large, low natural green area known as the Burger Bowl; and a flat artificial green area known as the Roe Stamps (formerly SAC) Fields are all located on the west side of the campus. In 2017, West Village, a multipurpose facility featuring dining options, meeting space, School of Music classrooms, and offices on West Campus, opened.

The Robert C. Williams Museum of Papermaking is located on West Campus. Also within walking distance of West Campus are several late-night eateries. West Campus was home to a convenience store, West Side Market, which closed following the opening of West Village in the fall of 2017. Because of limited space, all auto travel proceeds via a network of one-way streets that connects West Campus to Ferst Drive, the main road of the campus. Woodruff Dining Hall, or "Woody's," was the West Campus dining hall before closing after the opening of West Village. It connected the Woodruff North and Woodruff South undergraduate dorms.

=== East Campus ===
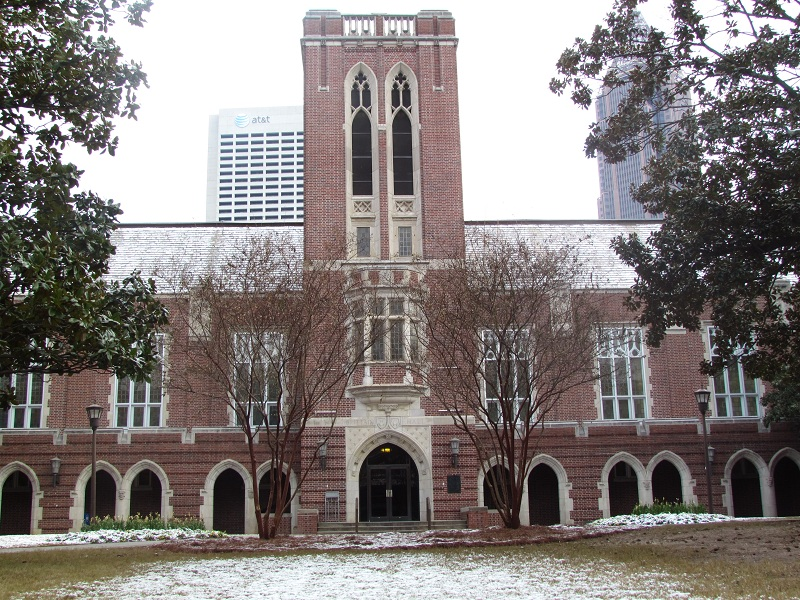
Brittain Dining Hall, a former dining hall for East Campus

East Campus houses all of the fraternities and sororities as well as most of the undergraduate first-year dormitories. East Campus abuts the Downtown Connector, granting residents quick access to Midtown and its businesses (for example, The Varsity) via a number of bridges over the highway. Georgia Tech football's home, Bobby Dodd Stadium, is located on East Campus, as is Georgia Tech basketball's home, McCamish Pavilion (formerly Alexander Memorial Coliseum).

North Avenue Dining Hall is the main dining hall for East Campus. Brittain Dining Hall, a dining hall on East Campus that closed in 2024, was modeled after a medieval church, complete with carved columns and stained glass windows showing symbolic figures. The main road leading from East Campus to Central Campus is a steep, ascending incline commonly known as "Freshman Hill" (in reference to the large number of first-year student dorms nearby). On March 8, 2007, the former Georgia State University Village apartments (also the former site of the 1996 Olympic Village) were transferred to Georgia Tech. Renamed North Avenue Apartments by the Institute, they began housing students in the fall semester of 2007.

=== Central Campus ===
Central Campus is home to the majority of the academic, research, and administrative buildings. The Central Campus includes, among others: the Clough Undergraduate Learning Commons; the Howey Physics Building; the Boggs Chemistry Building; the College of Computing Building; the Klaus Advanced Computing Building; the John and Joyce Caddell Building; the Skiles Classroom Building, which houses the School of Mathematics and the School of Literature, Media, and Communication; the D.M. Smith Building, which houses the Jimmy and Rosalynn Carter School of Public Policy; the Krone Engineered Biosystems Building; and the Ford Environmental Science and Technology Building. In 2005, the School of Modern Languages returned to the Swann Building, a 100-year-old former dormitory that now houses some of the most technologically-equipped classrooms on campus.

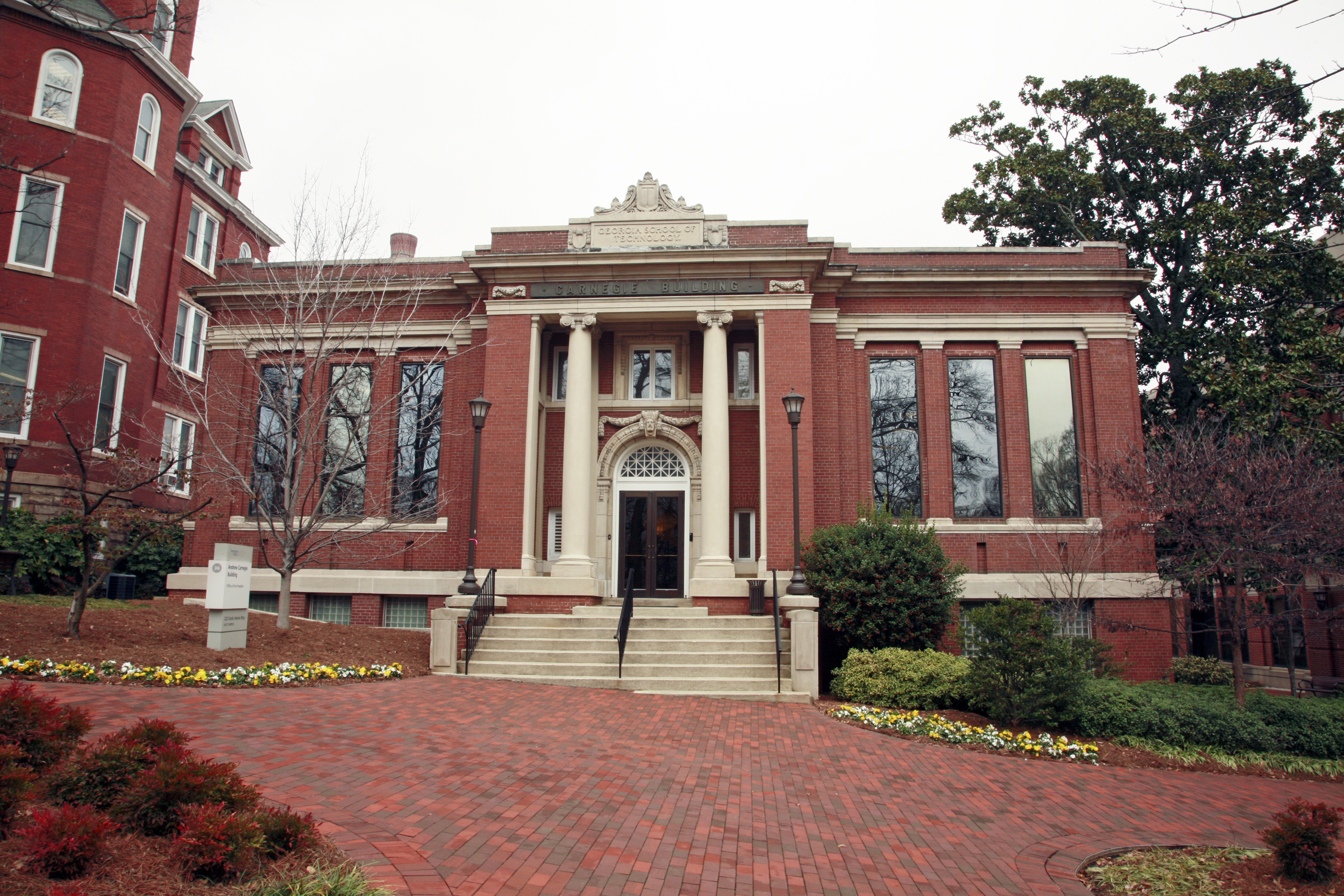
The Carnegie Building, constructed in 1907, is located in the Historic District of Central Campus. It was originally the campus library, and it now houses the president's office.

Georgia Tech's administrative buildings, such as Tech Tower and the Bursar's Office, are also located on the Central Campus. The campus library, the John Lewis Student Center (formerly the Fred B. Wenn Building), and the Smithgall Student Services Building ("Flag Building") are also located on Central Campus too. The Student Center provides a variety of recreational and social functions for students, including: a computer lab, a game room ("Tech Rec"), a post office, a music venue, two movie theaters, dining options, a reflection space, plus meeting rooms for various clubs and organizations. The Kessler Campanile (which is referred to by students as "The Shaft") is located next to the eastern entrance of the Student Center. The former Hightower Textile Engineering building was demolished in 2002 to create Yellow Jacket Park. More greenspace now occupies the area around the Kessler Campanile for a more aesthetically pleasing look, in accordance with the official Campus Master Plan. In August 2011, the G. Wayne Clough Undergraduate Learning Commons opened next to the library and occupies part of Tech Green (formerly Yellow Jacket Park).

=== Technology Square ===
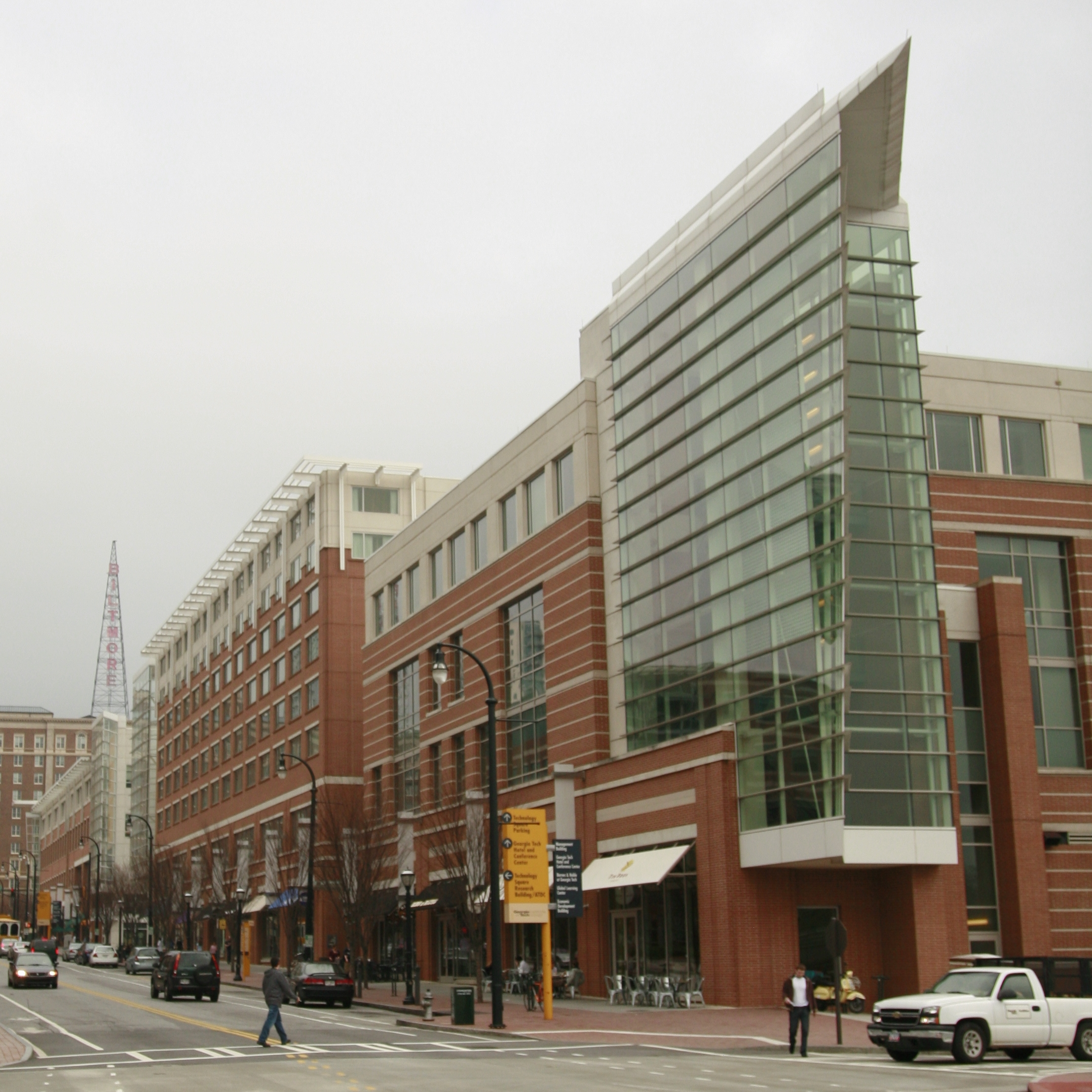
A view of Technology Square

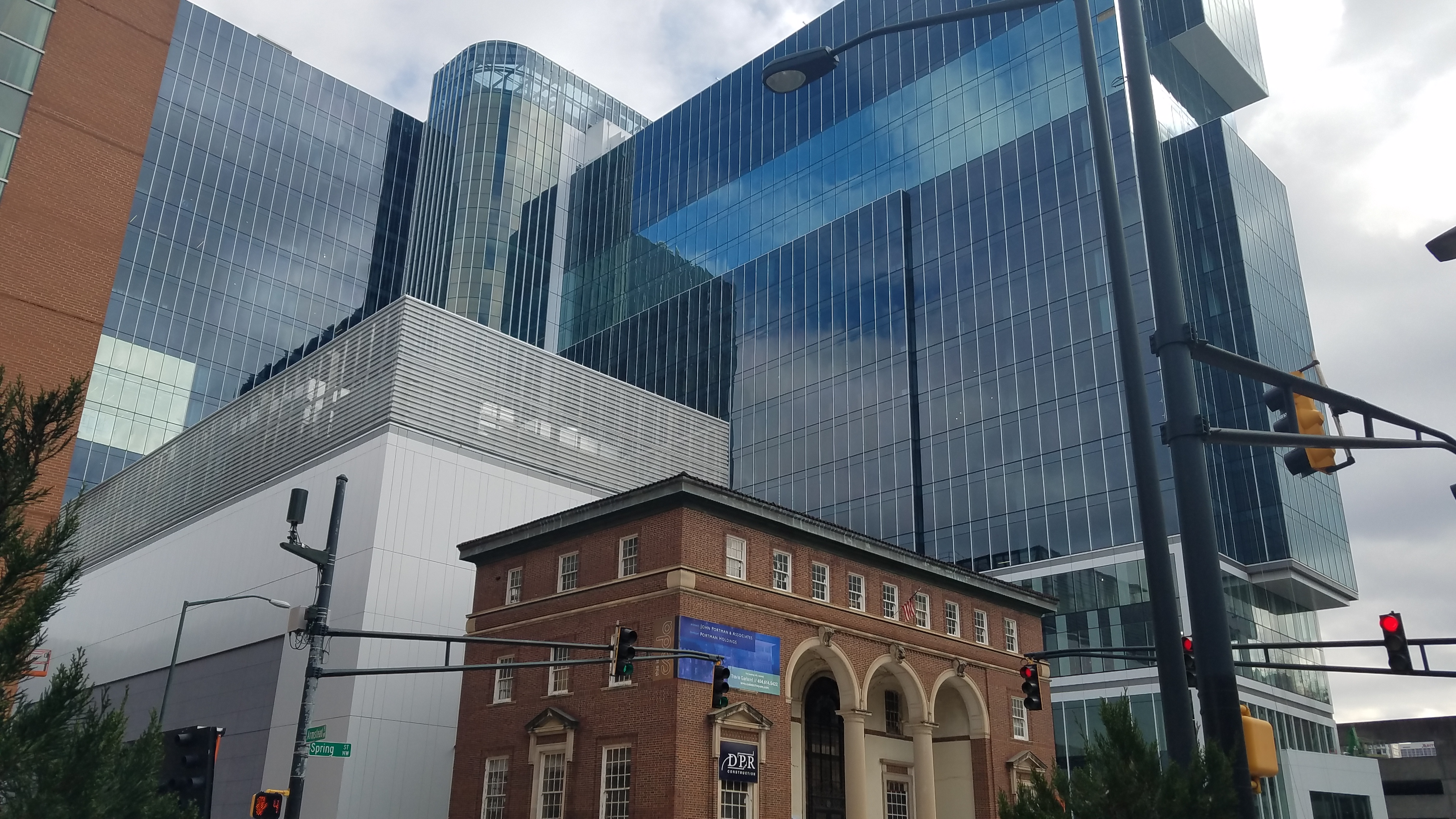
A view of the CODA building, a Mixed-use development

Technology Square, also known as "Tech Square," is located across the Downtown Connector and embedded in the city east of campus. Opened in August 2003 at a cost of $179 million, the district helped revive the area and has sparked a wider revitalization of the Midtown area. Connected by the Fifth Street Bridge, it is a pedestrian-friendly area comprising Georgia Tech facilities and retail locations. One complex contains the Scheller College of Business Building, holding classrooms and office space for the Ernest Scheller Jr. College of Business, as well as the Georgia Tech Hotel and Conference Center and the Georgia Tech Global Learning Center.

Another part of Tech Square, the privately owned Centergy One complex, contains the Technology Square Research Building (TSRB), holding faculty and graduate student offices for the College of Computing and the School of Electrical and Computer Engineering, as well as the GVU Center, a multidisciplinary technology research center. The Advanced Technology Development Center (ATDC), Georgia Tech's science and business incubator, is also headquartered in Centergy One.

Other Georgia Tech-affiliated buildings in the area host the Center for Quality Growth and Regional Development, the Georgia Tech Enterprise Innovation Institute, the Advanced Technology Development Center, VentureLab, the Georgia Electronics Design Center and the CODA building (a mixed-use development). Technology Square also hosts a variety of restaurants and businesses, including the headquarters of notable consulting companies like Accenture, a Barnes & Noble Georgia Tech bookstore, and a Georgia Tech-themed Waffle House.

=== Science Square ===
Science Square is a mixed‐use development dedicated to life sciences and biomedical research. It is located southwest of Georgia Tech's main campus, serving as a link between Georgia Tech and Atlanta's rapidly evolving Westside community. Opened in April 2024, the district spans 18 acres and features over 1.8 million square feet of laboratory and office space, 500 residential units, and 25,000 square feet of retail area. Due to eventually connect to the main campus by a pedestrian bridge, Science Square is the starting point for a multi-phase project designed to attract industry research partners. One of its central components is Science Square Labs, a 13-story tower designed to accommodate wet and dry laboratories for academia, industry, and startups.

=== Satellite campuses ===
In 1999, Georgia Tech began offering local degree programs to engineering students in Southeast Georgia and in 2003 established a physical campus in Savannah, Georgia. Until 2013, Georgia Tech Savannah offered undergraduate and graduate programs in engineering in conjunction with Georgia Southern University, South Georgia State College, Armstrong Atlantic State University (now Georgia Southern University–Armstrong Campus), and Savannah State University. Georgia Tech also collaborated with the National University of Singapore to set up the Logistics Institute–Asia Pacific in Singapore. The campus is home to the regional offices of the Georgia Tech Enterprise Innovation Institute, the Savannah Advanced Technology Development Center, and the Georgia Logistics Innovation Center.

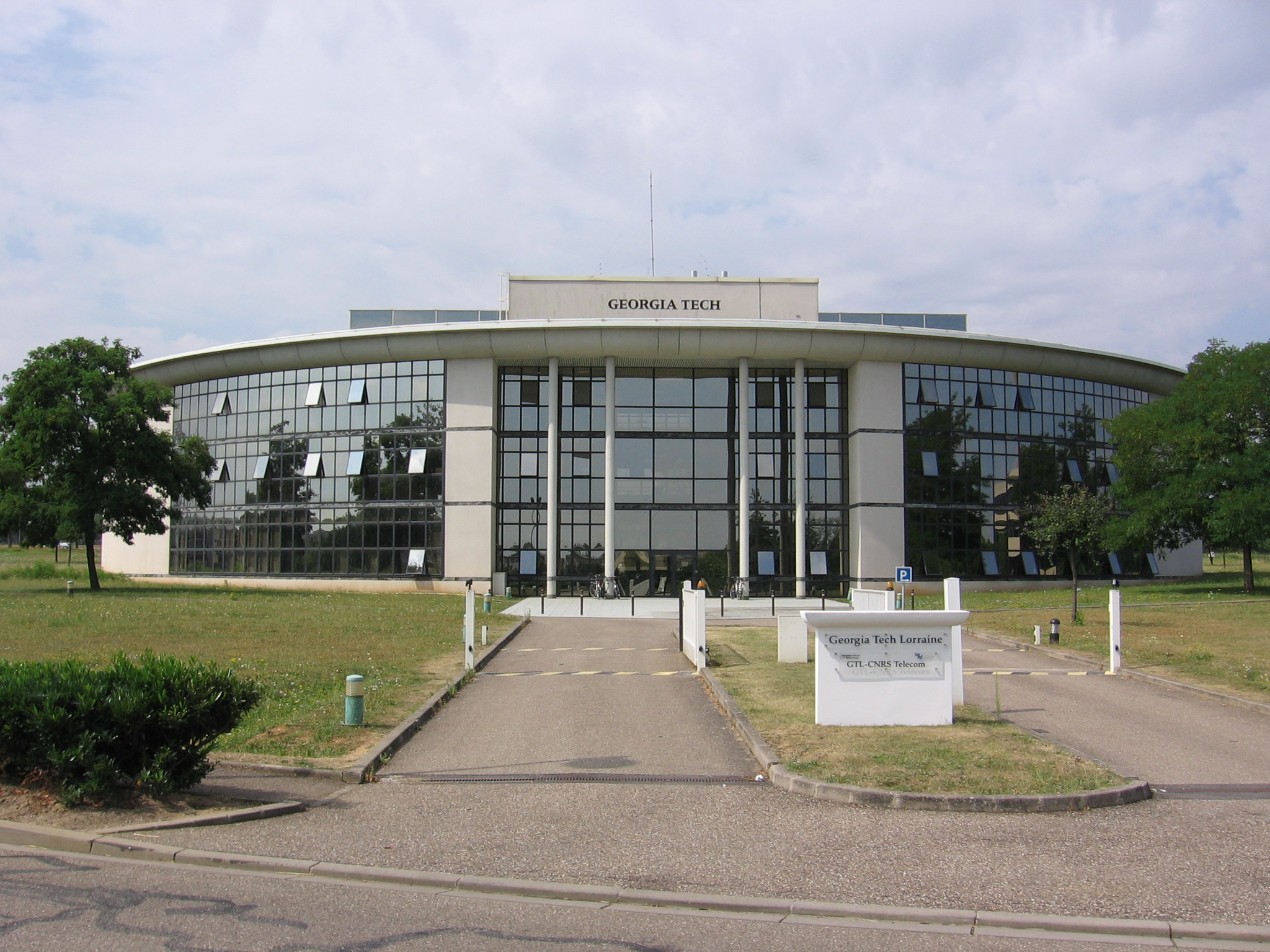
Georgia Tech Europe, Metz, France

Georgia Tech also operates a campus in Metz, in northeastern France, known as Georgia Tech Europe (GTE). Opened in October 1990, it offers master's-level courses in Electrical and Computer Engineering, Computer Science, and Mechanical Engineering and Ph.D. coursework in electrical and computer engineering and mechanical engineering. Georgia Tech Europe was the defendant in a lawsuit pertaining to the language used in advertisements, which was a violation of the Toubon Law.

Georgia Tech and Tianjin University cooperatively operated a campus in Shenzhen, Guangdong, China — Georgia Tech Shenzhen Institute, Tianjin University. Launched in 2014, it offered undergraduate and graduate programs in electrical and computer engineering, analytics, computer science, environmental engineering, and industrial design. Admission and degree requirements at Georgia Tech were the same as those in Atlanta. In September 2024, Georgia Tech announced that it was ending its partnership with Tianjin University following U.S. congressional scrutiny of potential ties to the People's Liberation Army.

The College of Design (formerly College of Architecture) maintains a small permanent presence in Paris in affiliation with the École d'architecture de Paris-La Villette, and the College of Computing has a similar program with the Barcelona School of Informatics at the Polytechnic University of Catalonia in Barcelona, Spain. There are additional programs in Athlone, Ireland; Shanghai, China; and Singapore. Georgia Tech was supposed to have set up two campuses for research and graduate education in the cities of Visakhapatnam and Hyderabad, Telangana, India by 2010, but it appeared the plans had been set on hold as of 2011.

=== Campus services ===
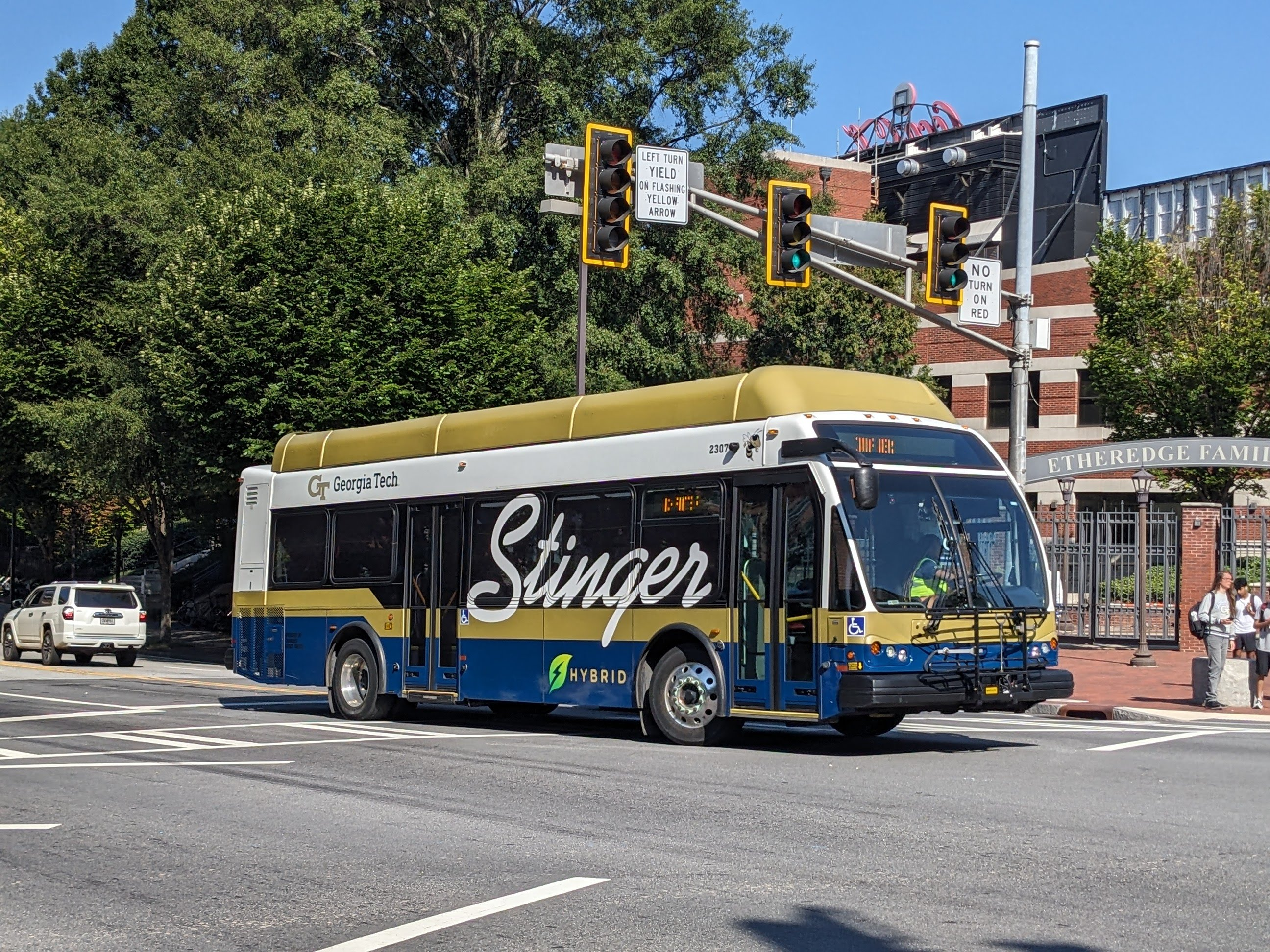
Stinger bus on North Avenue

The Stinger is the campus bus network and is open to the general public. Stinger routes transport students throughout campus and also offer connections to the Midtown station (MARTA), Atlantic Station, and Emory University.

The Office of Information Technology, or OIT, manages most of the Institute's computing resources (and some related services such as campus telephones). With the exception of a few computer labs maintained by individual colleges, OIT is responsible for most of the computing facilities on campus. Student, faculty, and staff email accounts are among its services. Georgia Tech's ResNet provides free technical support to all students and guests living in Georgia Tech's on-campus housing (excluding fraternities and sororities). ResNet is responsible for network, telephone, and television service, and most support is provided by part-time student employees.

Georgia Tech Cable Network, or GTCN, was the college's branded cable source from 1995 to 2022. Most non-original programming was obtained from Dish Network. GTCN had 100 standard-definition channels and 23 high-definition channels.

== Organization and administration ==
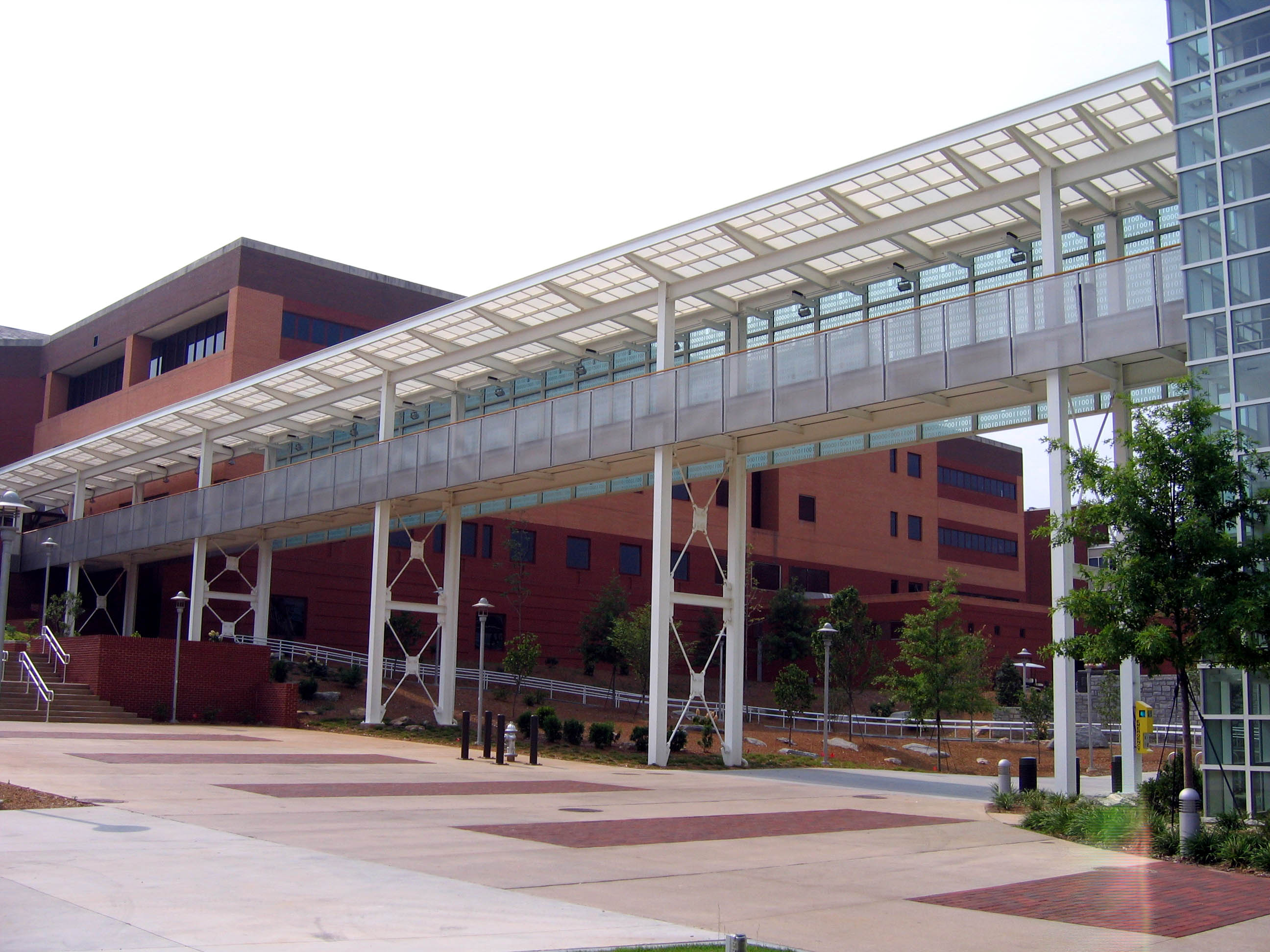
A pedestrian bridge links the Klaus Advanced Computing Building to the College of Computing Building.

Georgia Tech's undergraduate and graduate programs are divided into seven colleges. Georgia Tech has sought to expand its undergraduate and graduate offerings in less technical fields, primarily those under the Ivan Allen College of Liberal Arts, which saw a 20% increase in admissions in 2008. Also, even in the Ivan Allen College, the Institute does not offer Bachelor of Arts and Master of Arts degrees, only Bachelor of Science and Master of Science degrees. Georgia Tech's honors program is highly selective and designed to cater to the most intellectually curious undergraduates from all seven colleges.

- College of Computing
- College of Design
- College of Engineering

- College of Sciences
- Ivan Allen College of Liberal Arts
- Scheller College of Business
- College of Lifetime Learning

=== Funding ===
The Georgia Institute of Technology is a public institution that receives funds from the State of Georgia, tuition, fees, research grants, and alumni contributions. In 2025, the Institute reported a total revenue amounting to about $2.997 billion, of which 77% came from the Institute's own operations and 18.6% from state appropriations. Reported expenditures amounted to about $2.89 billion, of which 51% was spent on research and 15.8% on instruction. Total assets were reported to amount to about $3.644 billion. The Georgia Tech Foundation runs the university's endowment and was incorporated in 1932. It includes several wholly owned subsidiaries that own land on campus or in Midtown and lease the land back to the Georgia Board of Regents and other companies and organizations. As of 2007, Georgia Tech had the most generous alumni donor base, percentage wise, of any public university ranked in the top 50. In 2015, the university received a $30 million grant from Atlanta philanthropist Diana Blank to build the "most environmentally-sound building ever constructed in the Southeast." In 2025, Georgia Tech received the single largest donation in its history. Alumnus John W. Durstine bequeathed the university’s George W. Woodruff School of Mechanical Engineering $100 million, which is being used to expand facilities, programs, and research and fund faculty endowments.

== Academics ==
=== Undergraduate admissions ===
Admissions statistics
- 2025 entering class
- Admit rate: 12.7 (▼ −7.5)
- Yield rate: 45.76 (▲ +3.9)

Test scores middle 50%
- SAT Total: 1430–1530 (among 53% of FTFs)
- ACT Composite: 31–35 (among 36% of FTFs)

The 2022 annual ranking of U.S. News & World Report categorizes Georgia Institute of Technology as "most selective." For the Class of 2029 (enrolled fall 2025), Georgia Tech received 66,895 applications from first-time, first-year students and accepted 8,640 (12.74%). In the 2028 cycle, of those accepted, nearly 4,000 enrolled, a yield rate (the percentage of accepted students who choose to attend the university) of 45.8%. Of the 77% of the incoming first-year class who submitted SAT scores, the middle 50% composite scores were 1440. Of the 35% of enrolled first-year students in 2023 who submitted ACT scores, the middle 50% composite score was between 31 and 35 Georgia Tech's freshman retention rate is 98%, with 92% going on to graduate within six years. In the 2020–2021 academic year, 95 first-year students were National Merit Scholars which was the highest in Georgia.

In 2017, Georgia Tech announced valedictorians and salutatorians from Georgia's accredited public and private high schools with 50 or more graduates will be the only students offered automatic undergraduate admission via its Georgia Tech Scholars Program.

=== Rankings ===
Academic rankings

National
- Forbes: 28
- U.S. News & World Report: 29
- WSJ/College Pulse: 16

Global
- ARWU: 151–200
- QS: 142
- THE: 49
- U.S. News & World Report: 94

Georgia Tech's is ranked the 29th in the national university category by U.S. News & World Report for 2027. Times Higher Education World University Rankings ranks it 49th.

== Research ==
=== Facilities and classification ===
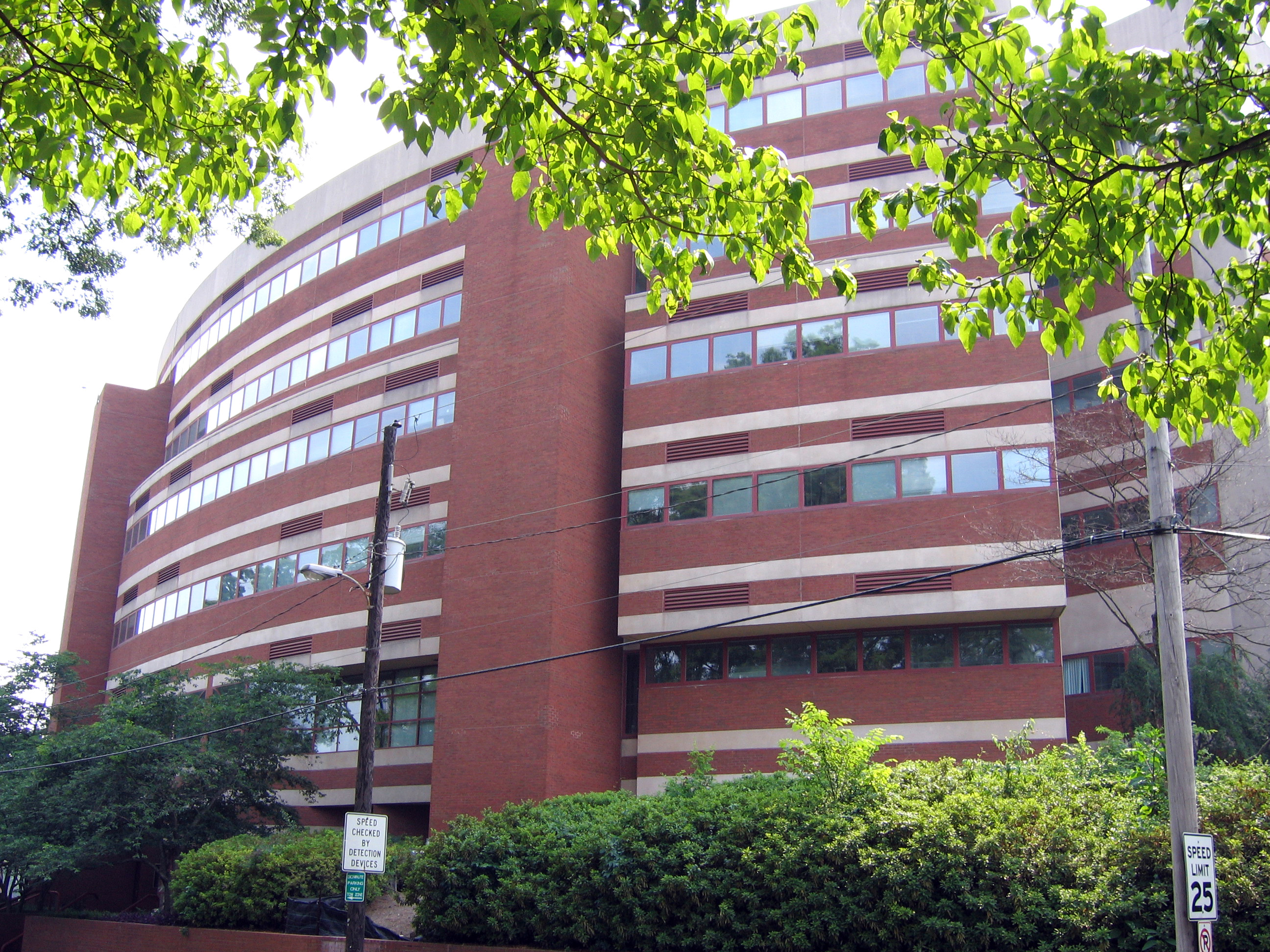
The Centennial Research Building, one of the buildings of the Georgia Tech Research Institute

Georgia Tech is classified among "Research 1: Very High Research Spending and Doctorate Production" universities. The National Science Foundation ranked Georgia Tech 15th among American universities for research and development expenditures in 2024 with $1.53 billion. Much of this research is funded by large corporations or governmental organizations. Research is organizationally under the Executive Vice President for Research, Tim Lieuwen, who reports directly to Georgia Tech's president. Eleven interdisciplinary research institutes report to him, with all research centers, laboratories and interdisciplinary research activities at Georgia Tech reporting through one of those institutes.

The oldest of those research institutes is a nonprofit research organization referred to as the Georgia Tech Research Institute (GTRI). GTRI provides sponsored research in a variety of technical specialties including radar, electro-optics, and materials engineering. More than 93% of its research is for federal sponsors, especially government-funded classified work. GTRI employs around 3,000 people and had $988 million in revenue in fiscal year 2025. The other institutes include: the Parker H. Petit Institute for Bioengineering and Bioscience, the Institute for Data Engineering and Science; the Strategic Energy Institute; the Georgia Tech Manufacturing Institute; the Institute for Matter and Systems; the Institute for Neuroscience, Neurotechnology, and Society; the Institute for People and Technology; the Renewable Bioproducts Institute; the Institute for Robotics and Intelligence Machines; the Space Research Institute; and the Brook Byers Institute for Sustainable Systems.

=== Entrepreneurship ===
Many startup companies are produced through research conducted at Georgia Tech, with the Advanced Technology Development Center and VentureLab ready to assist Georgia Tech's researchers and entrepreneurs in organization and commercialization. The Georgia Tech Research Corporation serves as Georgia Tech's contract and technology licensing agency. Georgia Tech is ranked fourth for startup companies, eighth in patents, and eleventh in technology transfer by the Milken Institute. Georgia Tech and GTRI devote 1,900,000 square feet (180,000 m^{2}) of space to research purposes, including the new $90 million Marcus Nanotechnology Building, one of the largest nanotechnology research facilities in the Southeastern United States with over 30,000 square feet (2,800 m^{2}) of clean room space. Georgia Tech encourages undergraduates to participate in research alongside graduate students and faculty. The Undergraduate Research Opportunities Program awards scholarships each semester to undergraduates who pursue research activities. These scholarships, called the President's Undergraduate Research Awards, take the form of student salaries or help cover travel expenses when students present their work at professional meetings. Additionally, undergraduates may participate in research and write a thesis to earn a "Research Option" credit on their transcripts. An undergraduate research journal, The Tower, was established in 2007 to provide undergraduates with a venue for disseminating their research and a chance to become familiar with the academic publishing process. Recent developments include a proposed graphene antenna.

Georgia Tech and Emory University have a strong research partnership and jointly administer the Emory-Georgia Tech Predictive Health Institute. They also, along with Peking University, administer the Wallace H. Coulter Department of Biomedical Engineering. In 2015, Georgia Tech and Emory were awarded an $8.3 million grant by the National Institutes of Health (NIH) to establish a National Exposure Assessment Laboratory. In July 2015, Georgia Tech, Emory, and Children's Healthcare of Atlanta were awarded a four-year, $1.8 million grant by the Cystic Fibrosis Foundation in order to expand the Atlanta Cystic Fibrosis Research and Development Program. In 2015, the two universities received a five-year, $2.9 million grant from the National Science Foundation (NSF) to create new bachelor's, master's, and doctoral degree programs and concentrations in healthcare robotics, which will be the first program of its kind in the Southeastern United States.

The Georgia Tech Panama Logistics Innovation & Research Center is an initiative between the H. Milton Stewart School of Industrial and Systems Engineering, the Ecuador National Secretariat of Science and Technology, and the government of Panama that aims to enhance Panama's logistics capabilities and performance through a number of research and education initiatives. The center is creating models of country level logistics capabilities that will support the decision-making process for future investments and trade opportunities in the growing region and has established dual degree programs in the University of Panama and other Panamanian universities with Georgia Tech. A similar center in Singapore, The Centre for Next Generation Logistics, was established in 2015 and is a collaboration between Georgia Tech and the National University of Singapore. The center will work closely with government agencies and the industry to perform research in logistics and supply chain systems for translation into innovations and commercialization to achieve transformative economic and societal impact.

=== Industry connections ===
Georgia Tech maintains close ties to industry. Many of these connections are made through Georgia Tech's cooperative education and internship programs. Georgia Tech's Division of Professional Practice (DoPP), established in 1912 as the Georgia Institute of Technology Cooperative Division, operates the largest and fourth-oldest cooperative education program in the United States and is accredited by the Accreditation Council for Cooperative Education.

The Graduate Cooperative Education Program, established in 1983, is the largest such program in the United States. It allows graduate students pursuing master's degrees or doctorates in any field to spend a maximum of two consecutive semesters working full- or part-time with employers. The Work Abroad Program hosts a variety of cooperative education and internship experiences for upperclassmen and graduate students seeking international employment and cross-cultural experiences. While all four programs are voluntary, they consistently attract high numbers of students. Career services removed any immigration-related discrimination from its platform after a Justice Department settlement agreement.

Georgia Tech's cooperative education and internship programs have been externally recognized for their strengths. The Undergraduate Cooperative Education was recognized by U.S. News & World Report as one of the top 10 "Programs that Really Work" for five consecutive years. U.S. News & World Report additionally ranked Georgia Tech's internship and cooperative education programs among 14 "Academic Programs to Look For" in 2006 and 2007. On June 4, 2007, the University of Cincinnati inducted Georgia Tech into its Cooperative Education Hall of Honor.

== Student life ==
Undergraduate demographics as of Fall 2023
Race and ethnicity	Total
White	36%
Asian	33%
International student	9%
Black	8%
Hispanic	8%
Two or more races	5%
Unknown	1%
Economic diversity
Low-income (Note: The percentage of students who received an income-based federal Pell grant intended for low-income students.)	14%
Affluent (Note: The percentage of students who are a part of the American middle class at the bare minimum.)	86%

Georgia Tech students benefit from many Institute-sponsored or related events on campus, as well as a wide selection of cultural options in the surrounding district of Midtown Atlanta, "Atlanta's Heart of the Arts". Home Park, a neighborhood that borders the north end of campus, is a popular living area for Georgia Tech students and recent graduates.

=== Student demographics ===
As of fall 2025, the student body consists of more than 56,000 undergraduate and graduate students, with graduate students making up 60% of the student body. The student body at Georgia Tech is approximately 68% male and 32% female.

Around 50% of all Georgia Tech students are residents of the state of Georgia, around 20% come from outside the U.S., and 25–30% are residents of other U.S. states or territories. The top states of origin for all non-Georgia U.S. students are Florida, Texas, California, North Carolina, Virginia, New Jersey, and Maryland. Students at Georgia Tech represent all 50 states and 114 countries. The top three countries of origin for all international students are China, India, and South Korea.

=== Housing ===
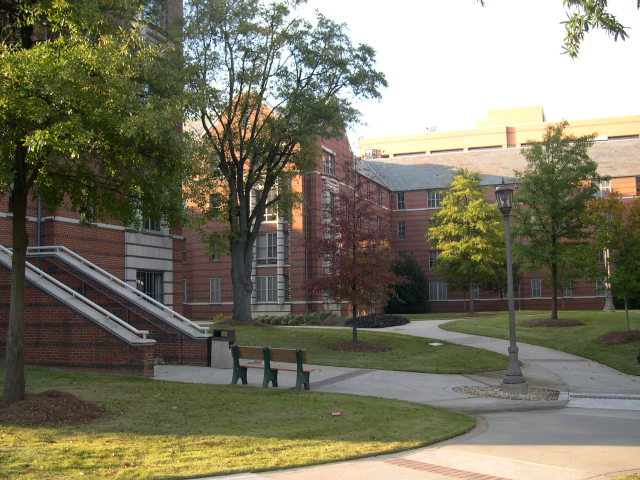
Eighth Street Apartments are apartment-style residence halls that opened in 1995 as housing for the athletes and journalists at the 1996 Summer Olympics as a part of the Olympic Village.

Georgia Tech Housing is subject to a clear geographic division of campus into eastern and western areas that contain the vast majority of housing. East Campus is largely populated by first-year students and is served by North Avenue Dining Hall. West Campus houses some first-year, transfer, and returning students (upperclassmen), and is served by West Village Dining Commons. Graduate students typically live off-campus (for example, in Home Park) or on-campus in the Graduate Living Center or Tenth and Home.

Two programs on campus have houses on East Campus: the International House (commonly referred to as the I-House) and Women, Science, and Technology. The I-House is housed in Gray and Hayes. Women, Science, and Technology is housed in Goldin and Stein. The I-House hosts an International Coffee Hour for residents and guests to discuss culture and interests.

Single graduate students may live in the Graduate Living Center (GLC) or at Tenth and Home. Tenth and Home is the designated family housing unit of Georgia Tech. Residents are zoned to Atlanta Public Schools' Centennial Place Academy and Midtown High School.

=== Student clubs and activities ===
Several extracurricular activities are available to students, including over 500 student organizations overseen by the Center for Student Engagement. The Student Government Association (SGA), Georgia Tech's student government, has separate executive, legislative, and judicial branches for undergraduate and graduate students. One of the SGA's primary duties is the disbursement of funds to student organizations in need of financial assistance. These funds are derived from the Student Activity Fee that all Georgia Tech students must pay, currently $123 per semester. The ANAK Society, a secret society and honor society established at Georgia Tech in 1908, claims responsibility for founding many of Georgia Tech's earliest traditions and oldest student organizations, including the SGA. Georgia Tech removed religious discrimination from its policies after multiple lawsuits by students that resulted in settlements and court-ordered changes.

=== Arts ===
Georgia Tech's Music Department was established as part of the school's General College in 1963 under the leadership of Ben Logan Sisk. In 1976, the Music Department was assigned to the College of Sciences and Liberal Studies, and in 1991 it was relocated to its current home in the College of Design. In 2009, it was reorganized into the School of Music. The Georgia Tech Glee Club, founded in 1906, is one of the oldest student organizations on campus, and still operates today as part of the School of Music. The Glee Club was among the first collegiate choral groups to release a recording of their songs. The group has toured extensively and appeared on The Ed Sullivan Show twice, providing worldwide exposure to "Ramblin' Wreck from Georgia Tech". Today, the modern Glee Club performs dozens of times each semester for many different events, including official Georgia Tech ceremonies, banquets, and sporting events.

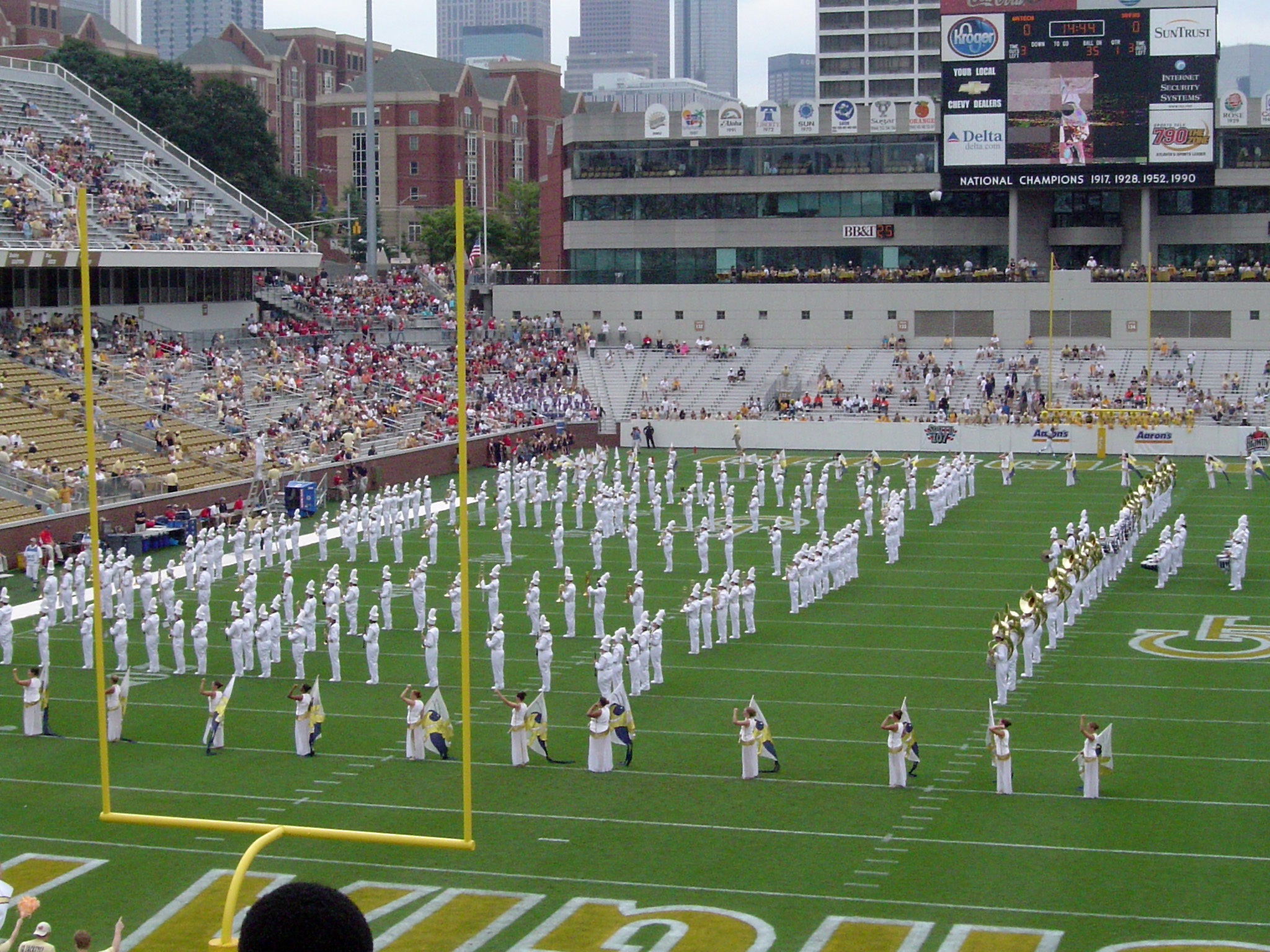
Bobby Dodd Stadium at Historic Grant Field, home of the Georgia Tech Yellow Jackets football team

The Georgia Tech Yellow Jacket Marching Band, also in the School of Music, represents Georgia Tech at athletic events and provides Georgia Tech students with a musical outlet. It was founded in 1908 by 14 students and Robert "Biddy" Bidez. The marching band consistently fields over 300 members. Members of the marching band travel to every football game.

The School of Music is also home to a number of ensembles, including two orchestras, two jazz ensembles, a concert band, and percussion ensembles. Students also can opt to form their own small Chamber Ensembles, either for course credit or independently.

Georgia Tech also has a music scene that is made up of groups that operate independently from the Music Department. These groups include four student-led a cappella groups: Nothin' but Treble, Sympathetic Vibrations, Taal Tadka, and Infinite Harmony. Musician's Network, another student-led group, runs two annual music festivals on campus. It formerly operated Under the Couch, a live music venue and recording facility that was initially located beneath the Couch Building on West Campus, was relocated to the Student Center, and then closed in 2018.

Many music, theatre, dance, and opera performances are held in the Ferst Center for the Arts. DramaTech is the campus' student-run theater. The theater has been entertaining Georgia Tech and the surrounding community since 1947. They are also home to Let's Try This! (the campus improv troupe) and DanceTech (a performing dance troupe). MomoCon is an annual fan convention held annually in March. It started as a free event hosted by Anime O-Tekku, the Georgia Tech anime club. Beginning in 2012, the convention rebranded as a paid event located at the Georgia World Congress Center.

=== Student media ===
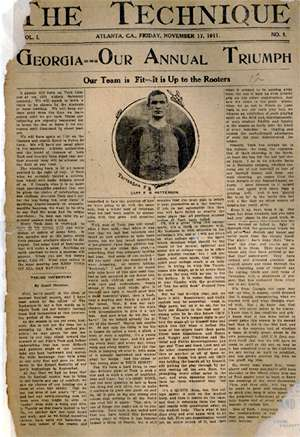
The front page of the first issue of The Technique

WREK is Georgia Tech's student-run radio station. Broadcast at 91.1 MHz on the FM band, the station is known as "Wrek Radio". Broadcasting with 100 kW ERP, WREK is among the nation's most powerful college radio stations. In April 2007, a debate was held regarding the future of the radio station. The prospective purchasers were GPB and NPR. WREK maintained its independence after dismissing the notion with approval from the Radio Communications Board of Georgia Tech. The Georgia Tech Amateur Radio Club, founded in 1912, is among the oldest collegiate amateur radio clubs in the nation. The club provided emergency radio communications during several disasters including numerous hurricanes and the 1985 Mexico earthquake.

The Technique, also known as the "'Nique", is Georgia Tech's official student newspaper. It is distributed weekly during the Fall and Spring semesters (on Fridays) and biweekly during the Summer semester (with certain exceptions). It was established on November 17, 1911. Blueprint is Georgia Tech's yearbook, established in 1908. Other student publications include Erato, Georgia Tech's literary magazine; The Tower, Georgia Tech's undergraduate research journal; T-Book, the student handbook detailing Georgia Tech traditions; and (intermittently) The North Avenue Review, Georgia Tech's "free-speech magazine". The offices of all student publications are located in the Student Services Building.

=== Greek life ===
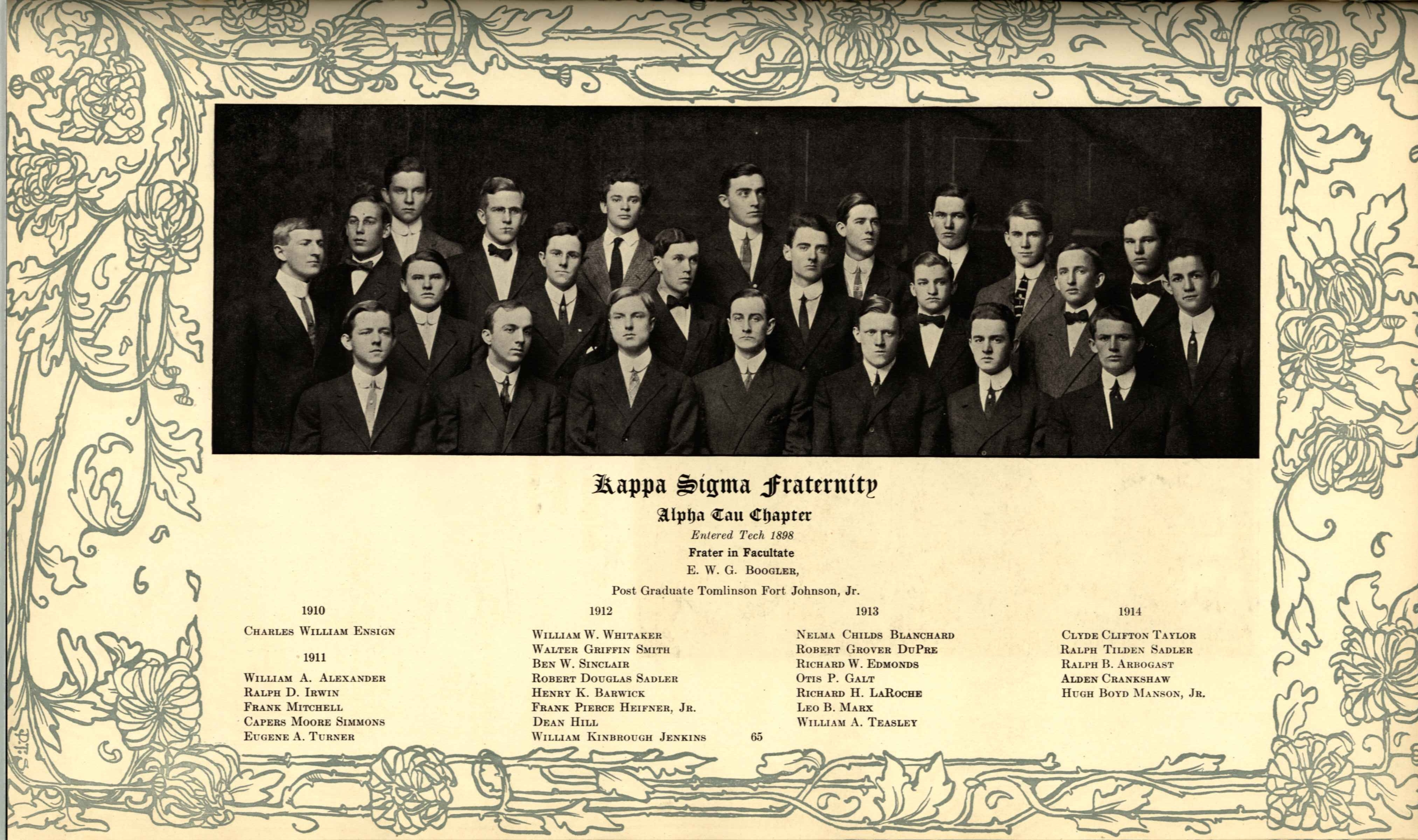
1910 Georgia Tech Blueprint – Fraternities Page 05

Greek life at Georgia Tech includes over 50 active chapters of social fraternities and sororities. All of the groups are chapters of national organizations, including members of the North American Interfraternity Conference, National Panhellenic Conference, and National Pan-Hellenic Council. The first fraternity to establish a chapter at Georgia Tech was Alpha Tau Omega in 1888, before the school held its first classes. The first sorority to establish a chapter was Alpha Xi Delta in 1954. In 2019, 28% of undergraduate men and 33% of undergraduate women were active in Georgia Tech's Greek system. There are two sororities and three fraternities that make up the Multicultural Panhellenic Council. Nine sororities make up the Collegiate Panhellenic Council (CPC).

== Athletics ==
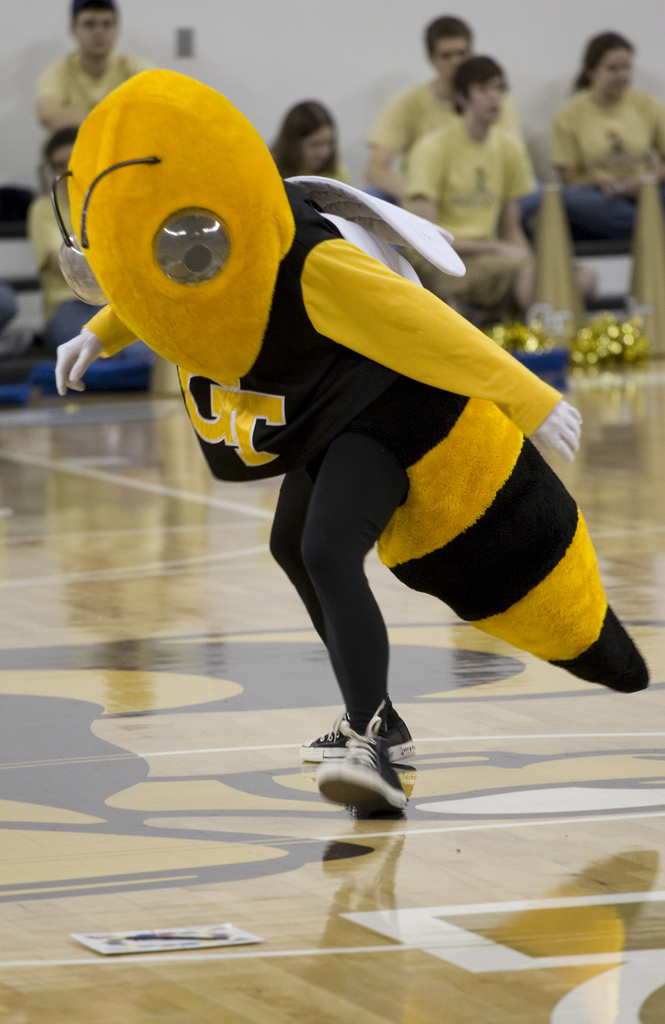
Buzz, the Georgia Tech Yellow Jackets' mascot

Georgia Tech teams are variously known as the Yellow Jackets, the Ramblin' Wreck and the Engineers; but are officially known as the Georgia Tech Yellow Jackets. They compete as a member of the NCAA Division I level, primarily in the Atlantic Coast Conference (ACC) for all sports since the 1979–80 season.

The Institute mascots are Buzz and the Ramblin' Wreck. The Institute's traditional football rival is the University of Georgia. The rivalry is commonly referred to as Clean, Old-Fashioned Hate. There is also a long-standing rivalry with Clemson. Georgia Tech has 14 varsity sports: football, women's and men's basketball, baseball, softball, volleyball, golf, men's and women's tennis, men's and women's swimming and diving, men's and women's track and field, men's and women's cross country, and coed cheerleading. Four Georgia Tech football teams were selected as national champions in news polls: 1917, 1928, 1952, and 1990. In May 2007, the women's tennis team won the NCAA National Championship with a 4–2 victory over UCLA, the first ever national title granted by the NCAA to Georgia Tech.

Georgia Tech participates in many non-NCAA sanctioned club sports, including airsoft, cycling, ice hockey, and wrestling. Many club sports take place at the Georgia Tech Aquatic Center, where swimming, diving, water polo, and the swimming portion of the modern pentathlon competitions for the 1996 Summer Olympics were held.

=== Fight songs ===
Tech's fight song "I'm a Ramblin' Wreck from Georgia Tech" is known worldwide. First published in the 1908 Blueprint, it was adapted from an old drinking song ("Son of a Gambolier") and embellished with trumpet flourishes by Frank Roman. Then-vice president Richard Nixon and Soviet Premier Nikita Khrushchev sang the song together when they met in Moscow in 1958 to reduce the tension between them. As the story goes, Nixon did not know any Russian songs, but Khrushchev knew that one American song as it had been sung on The Ed Sullivan Show.

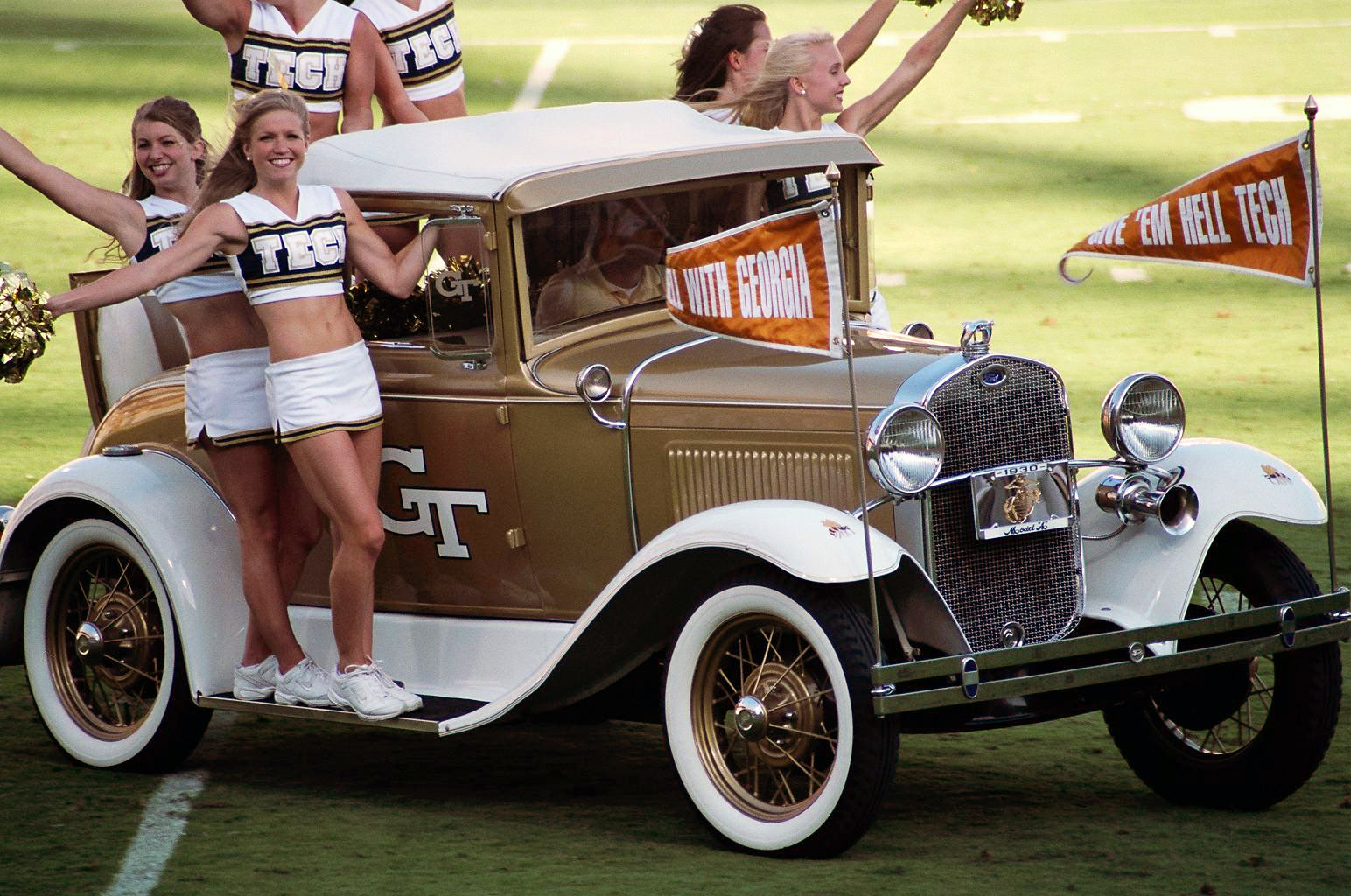
The Ramblin' Wreck at a football game in 2006

"I'm a Ramblin' Wreck" has had many other notable moments in its history. It is reportedly the first school song to have been played in space. Gregory Peck sang the song while strumming a ukulele in the movie The Man in the Gray Flannel Suit. John Wayne whistled it in The High and the Mighty. Tim Holt's character sings a few bars of it in the movie His Kind of Woman. There are numerous stories of commanding officers in Higgins boats crossing the English Channel on the morning of D-Day leading their men in the song to calm their nerves. It is played after every Georgia Tech score in a football game.

Another popular fight song is "Up With the White and Gold," which is usually played by the band preceding "Ramblin' Wreck." First published in 1919, "Up with the White and Gold" was also written by Frank Roman. The song's title refers to Georgia Tech's school colors, and its lyrics contain the phrase, "Down with the Red and Black," an explicit reference to the school colors of the University of Georgia and the then-budding Georgia Tech–UGA rivalry.

== Traditions ==
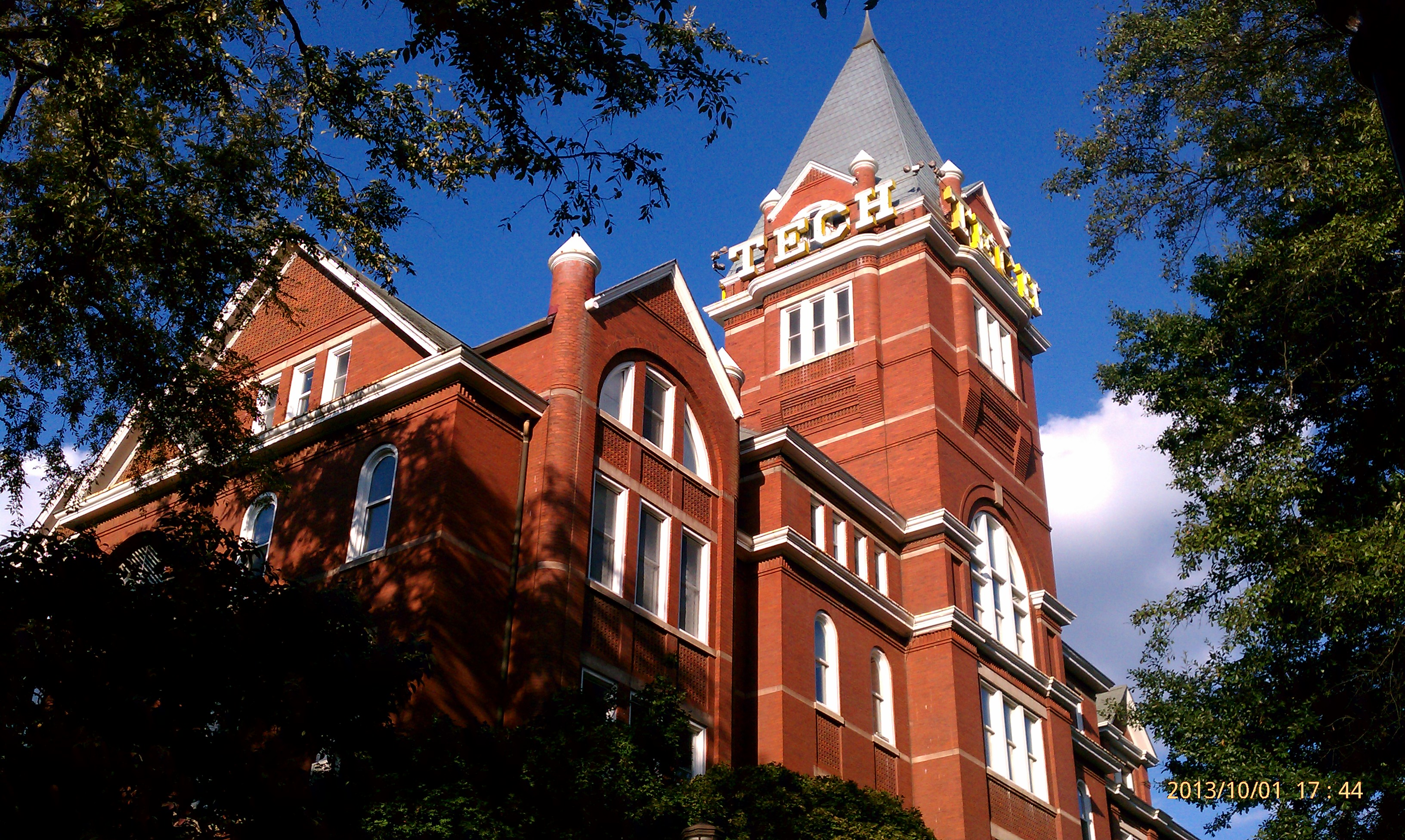
Tech Tower

Georgia Tech has a number of legends and traditions, some of which have persisted for decades. The most notable of these is the popular but rare tradition of stealing the "T" from Tech Tower. Tech Tower, Tech's historic primary administrative building, has the letters "TECH" hanging atop it on each of its four sides. There have been several attempts by students to orchestrate complex plans to steal the huge symbolic letter T, and on occasion they have carried this act out successfully.

=== School colors ===
Georgia Tech students hold a heated, long and ongoing rivalry with the University of Georgia, known as Clean, Old-Fashioned Hate, dating back to their first football game in 1893. The University of Georgia's literary magazine proclaimed UGA's colors to be "old gold, black, and crimson". Charles H. Herty, then-president of the University of Georgia, felt that old gold was too similar to yellow and that it "symbolized cowardice". After the 1893 football game against Georgia Tech, Herty removed old gold as an official color. Georgia Tech would first use old gold for their uniforms, as a proverbial slap in the face to UGA, in their first unofficial football game against Auburn in 1891. Georgia Tech's school colors would henceforth be old gold and white.

In April 2018 Georgia Tech went through a comprehensive brand redefinition solidifying the school colors into Tech Gold and White as the primary school colors while Navy Blue serves as the contrasting secondary color. The decision to move forward with gold, white and blue is rooted in history, as the first mention of official Georgia Tech class colors came in the Atlanta Constitution in 1891 (white, blue and gold) and the first GT class ring in 1894 also featured gold, white and blue.

=== Spirit organizations ===
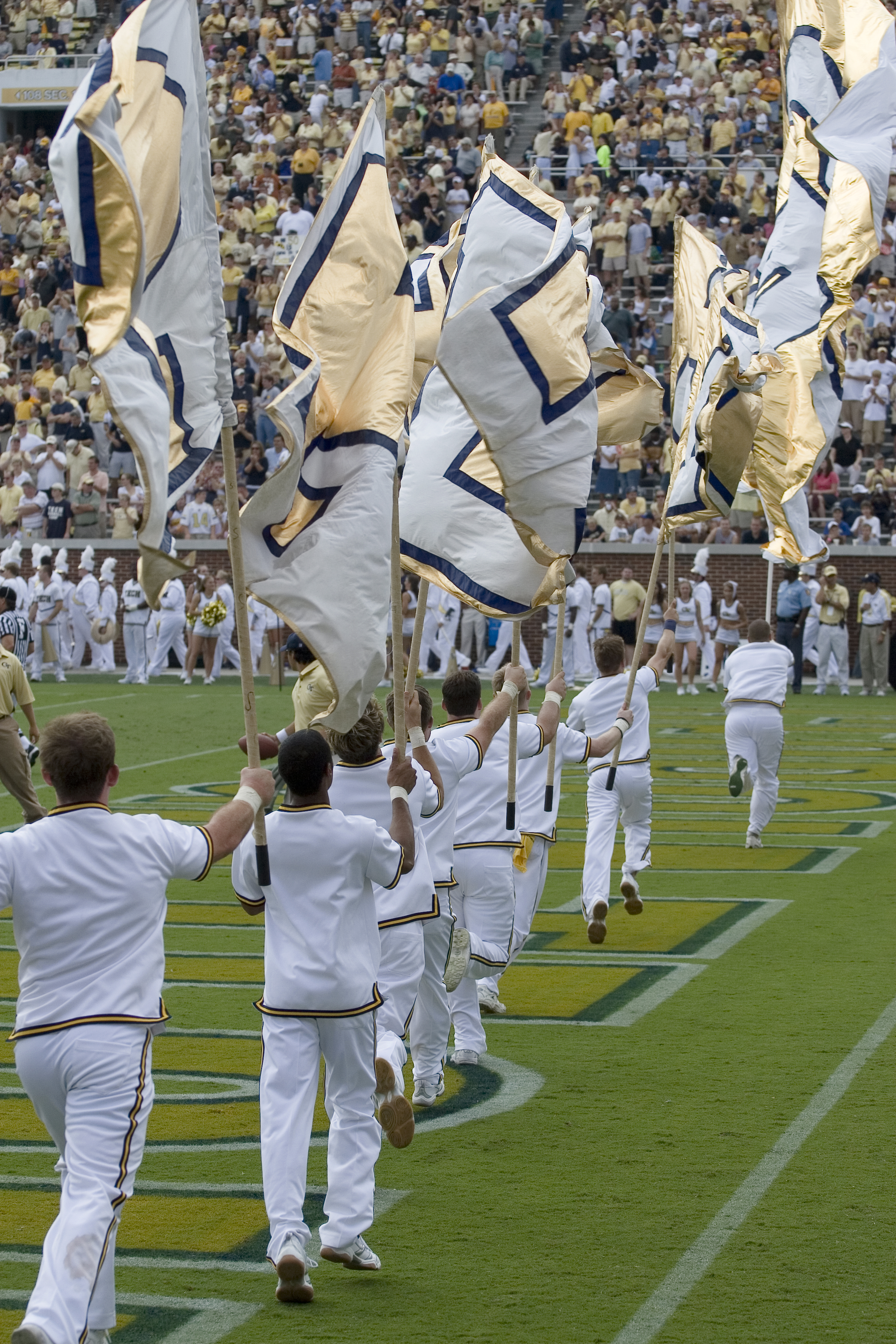
Georgia Tech cheerleaders waving flags after a touchdown

The Ramblin' Reck Club is charged with upholding all school traditions and creating new traditions such as the Swarm. The Swarm is a spirit group seated along the north end zone or courtside at basketball games. This is the group that typically features body painting, organized chants, and general fanaticism.

The Yellow Jacket Marching Band that performs at halftime and after big plays during the football season is clad in all white and sits next to the Swarm at football games, providing a dichotomy of white and gold in the north end zone. The band is also the primary student organization on campus that upholds the tradition of RAT caps, wherein band freshmen wear the traditional yellow cap at all band events.

== Notable people ==
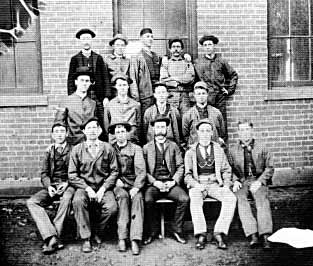
Georgia Tech's first two graduates were H. L. Smith (top row, center) and G. C. Crawford (top row, far right).

There are many notable graduates, non-graduate former students and current students of Georgia Tech. Georgia Tech alumni are known as Yellow Jackets. According to the Georgia Tech Alumni Association:

[the status of "alumni"] is open to all graduates of Georgia Tech, all former students of Georgia Tech who regularly matriculated and left Georgia Tech in good standing, active and retired members of the faculty and administration staff, and those who have rendered some special and conspicuous service to Georgia Tech or to [the alumni association].

The first class of 95 students entered Georgia Tech in 1888, and the first two graduates received their degrees in 1890. Since then, the Institute has greatly expanded, with an enrollment of 21,028 undergraduates and 31,436 postgraduate students as of fall 2025.

Jimmy Carter, the 39th president of the United States (1977 to 1981) and Nobel Peace Prize winner, briefly attended Georgia Tech in the early 1940s before matriculating at and graduating from the United States Naval Academy. Juan Carlos Varela, a 1985 industrial engineering graduate, was elected president of Panama in May 2014. Another Georgia Tech graduate and Nobel Prize winner, Kary Mullis, received the Nobel Prize in Chemistry in 1993. A large number of businesspeople (including but not limited to prominent CEOs and directors) began their careers at Georgia Tech. Some of the most successful of these are Charles "Garry" Betty (CEO, Earthlink), David Dorman (CEO, AT&T Corporation), Mike Duke (CEO, Wal-Mart), David C. Garrett Jr. (CEO, Delta Air Lines), and James D. Robinson III (CEO, American Express and later director of The Coca-Cola Company).

Georgia Tech graduates have been deeply influential in politics, military service, and activism. Atlanta mayor Ivan Allen Jr. and former United States Senator Sam Nunn have both made significant changes from within their elected offices. Former Georgia Tech president G. Wayne Clough was also a Tech graduate, the first Tech alumnus to serve in that position. Many notable military commanders are alumni: James A. Winnefeld Jr., who served as the ninth vice chairman of the Joint Chiefs of Staff; Philip M. Breedlove, who served as the Commander, U.S. Air Forces in Europe; William L. Ball, who was the 67th Secretary of the Navy; John M. Brown III, who was the Commander of the United States Army Pacific Command; and Leonard Wood, who was chief of staff of the Army and a Medal of Honor recipient for helping capture of the Apache chief Geronimo. Wood was also Georgia Tech's first football coach and (simultaneously) the team captain, and was instrumental in Tech's first-ever football victory in a game against the University of Georgia. Thomas McGuire was the second-highest scoring American ace during World War II and a Medal of Honor recipient.

Numerous astronauts and National Aeronautics and Space Administration (NASA) administrators spent time at Georgia Tech. Most notably, Retired Vice Admiral Richard H. Truly was the eighth administrator of NASA and later served as the president of the Georgia Tech Research Institute. John Young walked on the Moon as the commander of Apollo 16. He also was the first commander of the Space Shuttle and is the only person to have piloted four different classes of spacecraft.

Georgia Tech has its fair share of noteworthy engineers, scientists, and inventors too. Herbert Saffir developed the Saffir-Simpson Hurricane Scale, R. I. Sujith discovered intermittency in combustion regarding thermoacoustic systems, and W. Jason Morgan made significant contributions to the theory of plate tectonics and geodynamics. In computer science, Andy Hunt co-wrote "The Pragmatic Programmer" and was an original signatory of The Agile Manifesto, Krishna Bharat developed Google News, and D. Richard Hipp developed SQLite. Architect Michael Arad designed the World Trade Center Memorial in New York City. Despite their highly technical backgrounds, Georgia Tech graduates are no strangers to the arts or athletic competition. Among them, comedian/actor Jeff Foxworthy of Blue Collar Comedy Tour fame and Randolph Scott both called Georgia Tech home. Several famous athletes have, as well. About 150 Georgia Tech students have gone into the National Football League (NFL), with many others going into the National Basketball Association (NBA) or Major League Baseball (MLB). Well-known American football athletes include all-time greats such as Joe Hamilton, Pat Swilling, Billy Shaw, and Joe Guyon, former Georgia Tech head football coaches Pepper Rodgers and Bill Fulcher, and recent students such as Calvin Johnson, Demaryius Thomas and Tashard Choice. Some of Georgia Tech's recent entrants into the NBA include Josh Okogie, Chris Bosh, Derrick Favors, Thaddeus Young, Jarrett Jack, and Iman Shumpert. Award-winning baseball stars include Kevin Brown, Mark Teixeira, Nomar Garciaparra, and Jason Varitek. In golf, Georgia Tech alumni include the legendary Bobby Jones, who founded The Masters, and David Duval, who was ranked the No. 1 golfer in the world in 1999.

== See also ==
- List of colleges and universities in metropolitan Atlanta
