= Jeanette Shakalli =

Panamanian mathematician (born 1985)

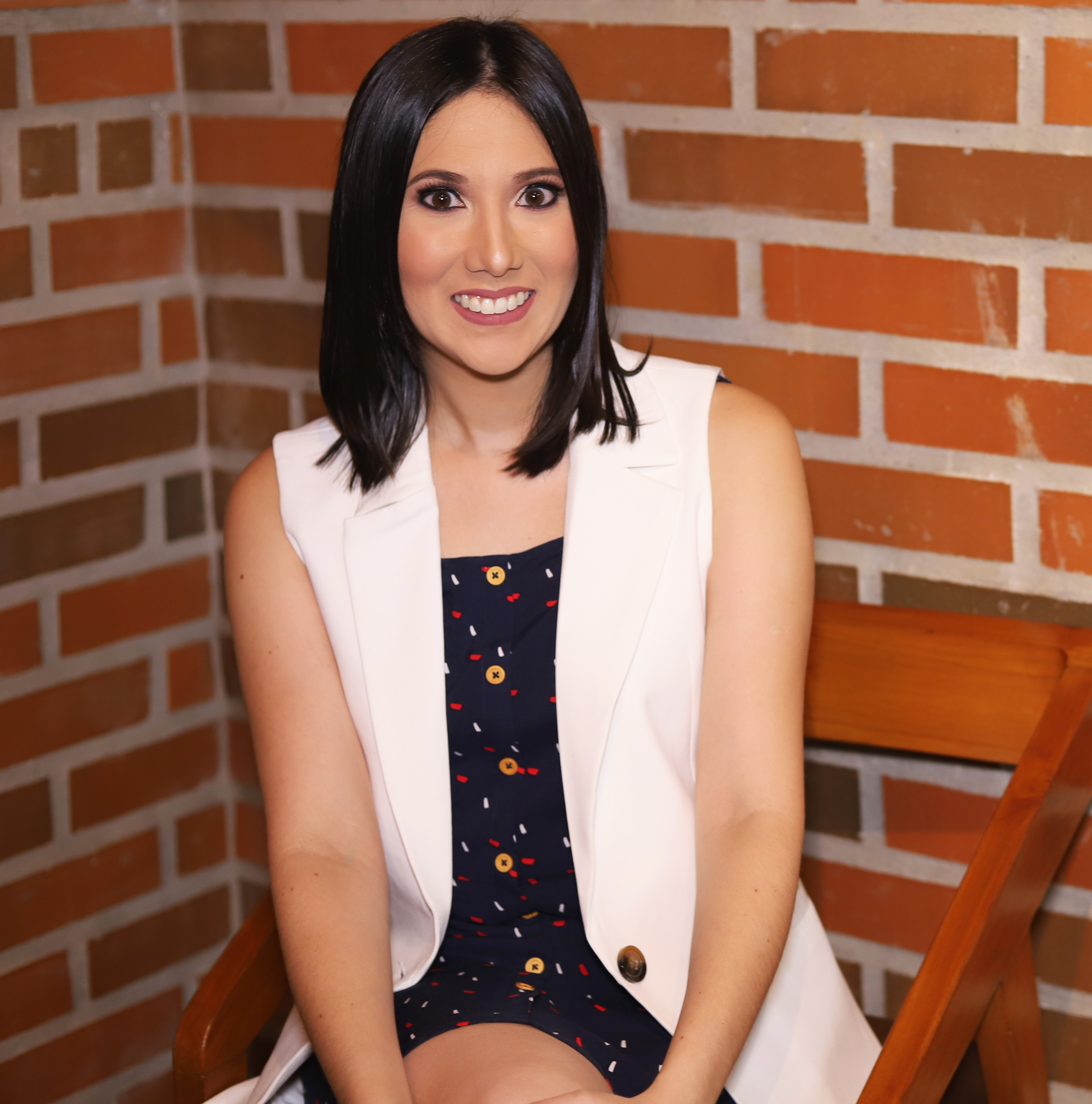
- Born: 1985 (age 40–41)
- Known for: Mathematical outreach in Panama
- Scientific career
- Doctoral advisor: Sarah Witherspoon

Jeanette Shakalli is a Panamanian mathematician best known for her outreach activities in the Republic of Panama. She is currently Executive Director of the Panamanian Foundation for the Promotion of Mathematics (FUNDAPROMAT) a private non-profit foundation established to promote the study of mathematics in Panama.

== Education ==
Shakalli earned a Bachelor of Science in Mathematics and Chemistry from the University of Notre Dame. In 2012, she received a Ph.D. in Mathematics from Texas A&M University under the advisement of Sarah J. Witherspoon.

== Career ==
From 2012 to 2019 Shakalli worked for National Secretariat of Science, Technology, and Innovation (SENACYT) of Panama. In 2016, she created the Program on Math Outreach in Panama which holds several activities a year on recreational mathematics. Since then she has organized over 50 mathematical outreach events in Panama.

She is chair of the Program Committee for Mathematics Association of America's SIGMAA on Recreational Mathematics program. In 2017, she became the International Mathematical Union's (IMU) Committee for Women in Mathematics (CWM) Ambassador for Panama. She is on the board of directors of both the IEEE Panama Section as secretary and the Panamanian Association for the Advancement of Science (APANAC) as admissions director.

== Honors ==
In 2007, Shakalli was awarded the Senior GE Prize for Mathematics Majors at the University of Notre Dame which is given to one who excelled in mathematics in their senior year. Shakalli was recognized as Rotarian of the Year for 2018-2019 by the Rotary Club of Panama.
