= 2006–07 Georgia Tech Yellow Jackets women's tennis team =

American college tennis season

2006–07 Georgia Tech Yellow Jackets women's tennis

National Champions ACC Champions, W 4-1 vs. Miami

NCAA Women's Tennis Championship, W, 4-2 vs. UCLA
- Conference: Atlantic Coast Conference
- Coastal
- Record: 25-4 (13-1 ACC)
- Head coach: Bryan Shelton
- Assistant coaches: Mariel Verban; Robin Stephenson

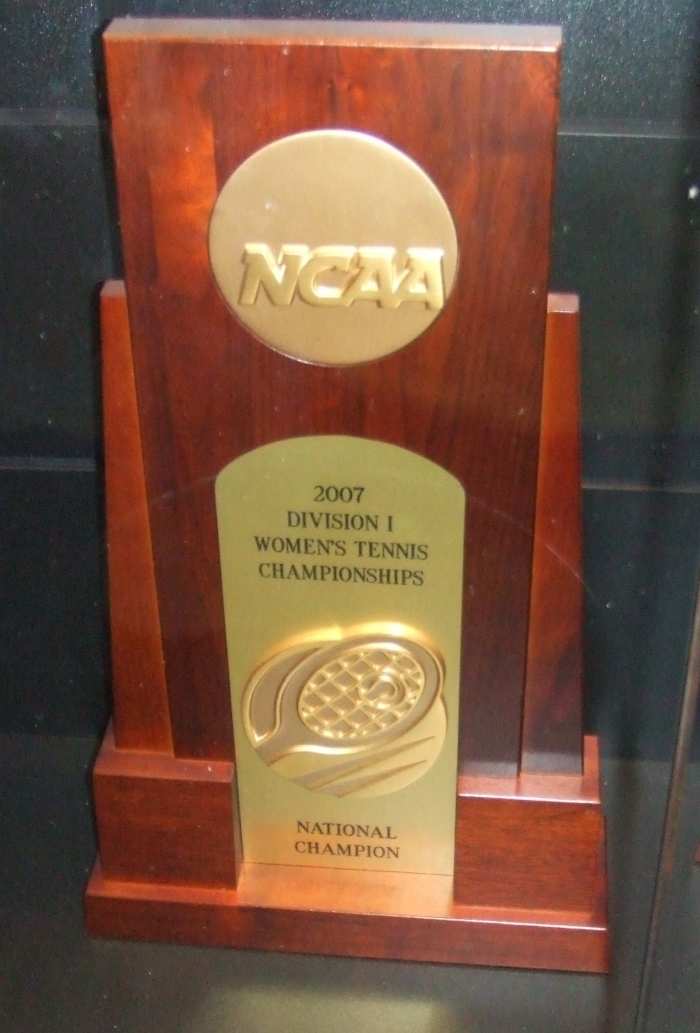
The 2007 NCAA Women's Tennis Championship trophy.

The 2006-07 Georgia Tech Yellow Jackets tennis team represented the Georgia Tech Yellow Jackets in the college tennis season of 2006-07. This season netted them their third straight ACC Championship, and their win in the NCAA tournament earned Georgia Tech its first-ever NCAA-recognized title.

== Roster ==
Name	Height	Year	Hometown	Last school
Amanda Craddock	5-10	Freshman	St. Louis, Missouri	University of Missouri-Columbia
Kirsten Flower	5-7	Freshman	Columbus, Ohio	Upper Arlington
Whitney McCray	5-6	Junior	Decatur, Ga.	Greater Atlanta Christian
Amanda McDowell	5-6	Freshman	Atlanta, Ga.	Marist
Kristi Miller	5-7	Junior	Marysville, Mich	Marysville
Tarryn Rudman	5-2	Senior	Johannesburg, South Africa	Mississippi State
Alison Silverio	5-8	Senior	Louisville, Ohio	St. Thomas Aquinas
Christy Striplin	5-7	Sophomore	Birmingham, Ala.	Pendleton

== Schedule ==
Date	Event/Opponent	Location	Time (EST)	Result	Overall	Conf.	Recap
Pre-season tournaments and championships
September 30, 2006	Riviera/ITA All-American Championships	Pacific Palisades, CA					
October 1, 2006	Riviera/ITA All-American Championships	Pacific Palisades, CA					
October 2, 2006	Riviera/ITA All-American Championships	Pacific Palisades, CA					
October 3, 2006	Riviera/ITA All-American Championships	Pacific Palisades, CA					
October 4, 2006	Riviera/ITA All-American Championships	Pacific Palisades, CA					
October 5, 2006	Riviera/ITA All-American Championships	Pacific Palisades, CA					
October 6, 2006	Riviera/ITA All-American Championships	Pacific Palisades, CA					
October 7, 2006	Riviera/ITA All-American Championships	Pacific Palisades, CA					
October 8, 2006	Riviera/ITA All-American Championships	Pacific Palisades, CA					
October 19, 2006	ITA South Regionals	Tuscaloosa, AL					
October 20, 2006	ITA South Regionals	Tuscaloosa, AL					
October 21, 2006	ITA South Regionals	Tuscaloosa, AL					
October 22, 2006	ITA South Regionals	Tuscaloosa, AL					
November 2, 2006	ITA National Indoors	Columbus, OH					
November 3, 2006	ITA National Indoors	Columbus, OH					
November 3, 2006	Palm Springs Desert Classic	Palm Springs, FL					
November 4, 2006	ITA National Indoors	Columbus, OH					
November 4, 2006	Palm Springs Desert Classic	Palm Springs, FL					
November 5, 2006	ITA National Indoors	Columbus, OH					
November 5, 2006	Palm Springs Desert Classic	Palm Springs, FL					
November 10, 2006	UNC Invitational	Chapel Hill, NC					
November 11, 2006	UNC Invitational	Chapel Hill, NC					
November 12, 2006	UNC Invitational	Chapel Hill, NC					
January 12, 2007	UNLV Invitational	Las Vegas, NV					
January 13, 2007	National Collegiate Tennis Classic	Palm Springs, CA					
January 13, 2007	UNLV Invitational	Las Vegas, NV					
January 14, 2007	UNLV Invitational	Las Vegas, NV					
ITA National Team Indoors
February 1, 2007	vs. Pepperdine	Madison, WI	10:00 AM	W, 6-0			
February 2, 2007	vs. North Carolina	Madison, WI	3:30 PM	W, 4-3			
February 3, 2007	vs. Stanford	Madison, WI	4:30 PM	W, 4-3			
February 3, 2007	vs. Notre Dame	Madison, WI	12:00 PM	W, 4-2			
Regular Season
February 10, 2007	@ William & Mary	Champaign, IL	12:00 PM	L, 4-3	0-1	0-0	
February 11, 2007	@ Illinois	Champaign, IL	12:00 PM	W, 4-0	1-1	0-0	
February 12, 2007	@ Northwestern	Chicago, IL	4:00 PM	W, 4-3	2-1	0-0	
February 17, 2007	Auburn	Atlanta, GA	12:00 PM	W, 7-0	3-1	0-0	
February 22, 2007	@ Vanderbilt	Nashville, TN	3:30 PM	L, 5-2	3-2	0-0	
February 24, 2007	Denver	Atlanta, GA	3:30 PM	W, 6-1	4-2	0-0	
February 28, 2007	@ Georgia	Athens, GA	2:30 PM	L, 5-2	4-3	0-0	
March 3, 2007	@ Clemson	Clemson, SC	1:30 PM	L, 4-3	4-4	0-1	
March 9, 2007	@ Maryland	College Park, MD	3:00 PM	W, 7-0	5-4	1-1	
March 11, 2007	@ Boston College	Boston, Mass		W, 7-0	6-4	2-1	
March 21, 2007	@ South Florida	Tampa, FL	2:00 PM	W, 5-2	7-4	2-1	
March 24, 2007	Miami	Atlanta, GA	12:00 PM	W, 5-2	8-4	3-1	
March 25, 2007	Florida State	Atlanta, GA	10:00 AM	W, 6-1	9-4	4-1	
March 31, 2007	North Carolina	Atlanta, GA	12:00 PM	W, 4-3	10-4	5-1	
April 1, 2007	Duke	Atlanta, GA	1:00 PM	W, 4-3	11-4	6-1	
April 7, 2007	@ Wake Forest	Winston-Salem, NC	12:00 PM	W, 5-2	12-4	7-1	
April 8, 2007	@ NC State	Raleigh, NC	12:00 PM	W, 6-1	13-4	8-1	
April 11, 2007	Furman	Atlanta, GA	2:00 PM	W, 7-0	14-4	8-1	
April 14, 2007	@ Virginia Tech	Blacksburg, VA	12:00 PM	W, 7-0	15-4	9-1	
April 15, 2007	@ Virginia	Charlottesville, VA	11:00 AM	W, 5-2	16-4	10-1	
ACC Championships
April 19, 2007	vs. Duke	Cary, NC	12:00 PM	W, 4-0	17-4	11-1	
April 21, 2007	vs. North Carolina	Cary, NC	1:00 PM	W, 4-2	18-4	12-1	
April 22, 2007	vs. Miami	Cary, NC	11:00 AM	W, 4-1	19-4	13-1	
NCAA Tournament
May 12, 2007	vs. Furman	Atlanta, GA	12:00 PM	W, 4-0	20-4	13-1	
May 13, 2007	vs. Kentucky	Atlanta, GA	12:00 PM	W, 4-0	21-4	13-1	
May 18, 2007	vs. Fresno State	Athens, GA	3:00 PM	W, 4-2	22-4	13-1	
May 20, 2007	vs. Notre Dame	Athens, GA	3:00 PM	W, 4-2	23-4	13-1	
May 21, 2007	vs. Cal	Athens, GA		W, 4-2	24-4	13-1	
May 22, 2007	vs. UCLA	Athens, GA		W, 4-2	25-4	13-1	
