= R. I. Sujith =

Professor of Aerospace Engineering

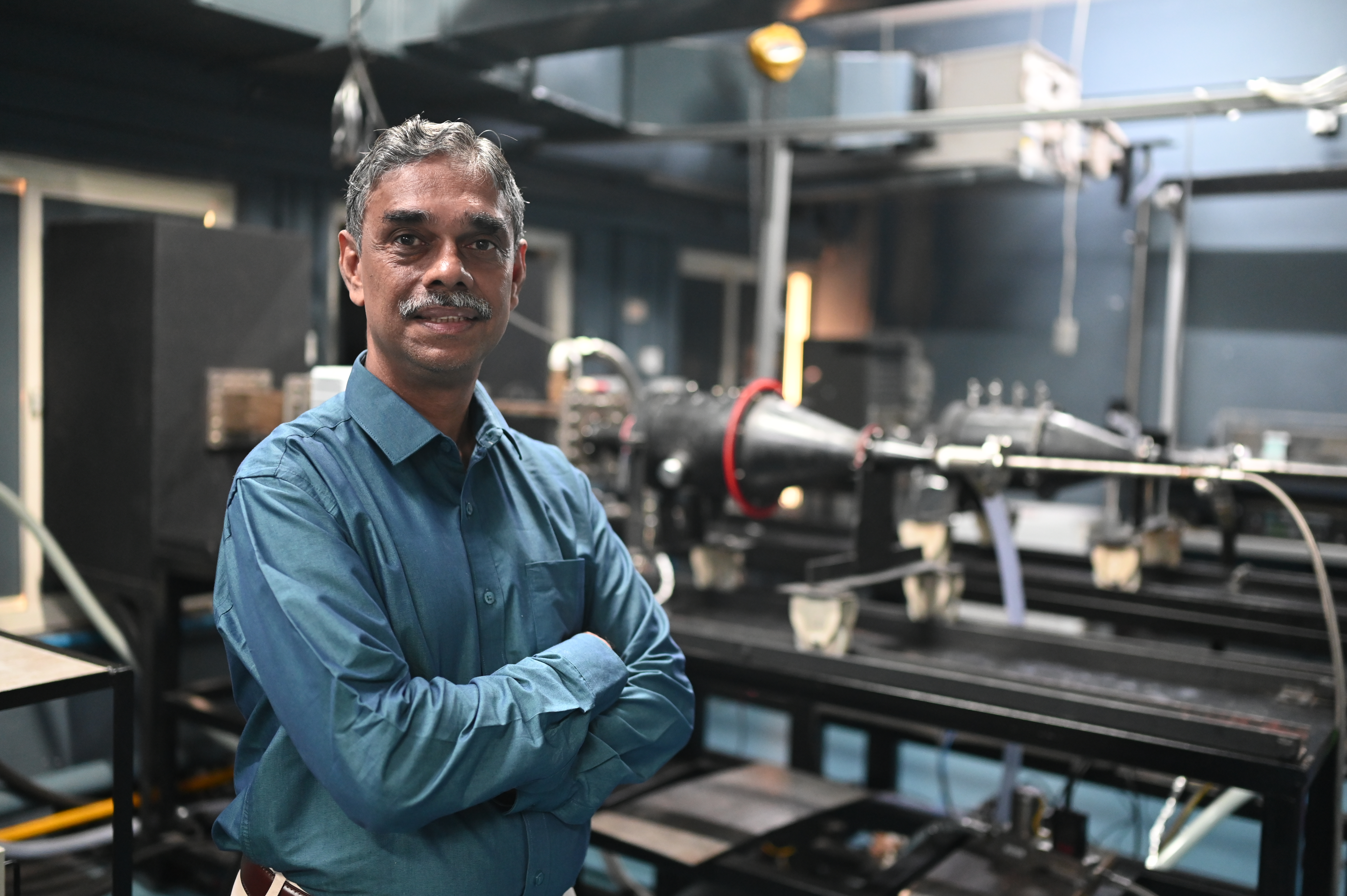
- Sujith in his laboratory, 2023
- Born: Sujith Raman Pillai Indusekharan Nair; 11 May 1967; Thiruvananthapuram, India
- Known for: Thermoacoustic instability and complex systems
- Title: D. Srinivasan Institute Chair Professor
- Awards: Keshav-Rangnath Excellence in Research Award (2016), Bhagya Lakshmi Krishna Iyengar Award (2015), J. C. Bose Patent Award (2013)

Academic background
- Education: Georgia Institute of Technology Indian Institute of Technology Madras
- Thesis: Behavior of droplets in axial acoustic fields (1994)
- Doctoral advisor: Ben T. Zinn

Academic work
- Institutions: Indian Institute of Technology Madras
- Website: http://www.ae.iitm.ac.in/~sujith/

Sujith Raman Pillai Indusekharan Nair (born 11 May 1967), known as R. I. Sujith, is an Indian aerospace engineer. He is Institute Professor and the D. Srinivasan Chair Professor at the Department of Aerospace Engineering at IIT Madras.

== Early life ==
Sujith was born on 11 May 1967 in Thiruvananthapuram, Kerala, India. He completed his Bachelor of Technology in aerospace engineering at IIT Madras. He earned his PhD in aerospace engineering on "Behavior of Droplets in Axial Acoustic Fields" working with Ben T. Zinn at the Georgia Institute of Technology from 1990 to 1994. He worked as a postdoctoral fellow in the same department from 1994 to 1995. He then joined IIT Madras as a lecturer in the Department of Aerospace Engineering.

== Research ==
Sujith’s research focuses on thermoacoustic instability. His work has examined low-amplitude aperiodic pressure fluctuations, commonly referred to as combustion noise, and has characterized them as deterministic and exhibiting chaotic behavior.

He has studied intermittency as an intermediate dynamical state during the transition of turbulent thermoacoustic systems from combustion noise to instability. His research has also explored the multifractal nature of combustion noise and its evolution with the onset of instability. In addition, he has proposed an analogy between the onset of oscillatory instabilities and Bose–Einstein condensation, which has been used to derive scaling relationships applicable to different systems.

Sujith has applied complex network approaches to thermoacoustic systems, identifying changes in network topology during transitions from combustion noise to instability, with implications for early detection. His work further encompasses topics such as chimera states, rate-induced tipping (R-tipping), synchronization, amplitude death, partial amplitude death, and phase-flip bifurcation in thermoacoustic systems.

== Honours and awards ==
In 2023 he was inducted as International Member of the United States National Academy of Engineering. He was selected as a fellow of the Combustion Institute in 2022, and was awarded the Distinguished Fellowship of the International Institute of Acoustics and Vibration in 2021. He received the J. C. Bose Fellowship in 2019 and the Swarnajayanti Fellowship in 2005 from the Department of Science and Technology of the Government of India. He is a fellow of the Indian Academy of Sciences, an associate fellow of the American Institute of Aeronautics and Astronautics, a fellow of the Indian National Academy of Engineering and an honorary fellow of the Indian Society of Systems for Science and Engineering (ISSE). He has been awarded Hans Fischer Senior Fellowship from the TUM Institute for Advanced Study in 2010. He was awarded fellowship of the Alexander von Humboldt Foundation in 2000. He was the editor-in-chief of the International Journal of Spray and Combustion Dynamics from 2009 to 2015. He is currently a member of the editorial advisory board of Chaos: An Interdisciplinary Journal of Nonlinear Science.
