= Krone Engineered Biosystems Building =

Coordinates: 33°46′50.6″N 84°23′54.3″W

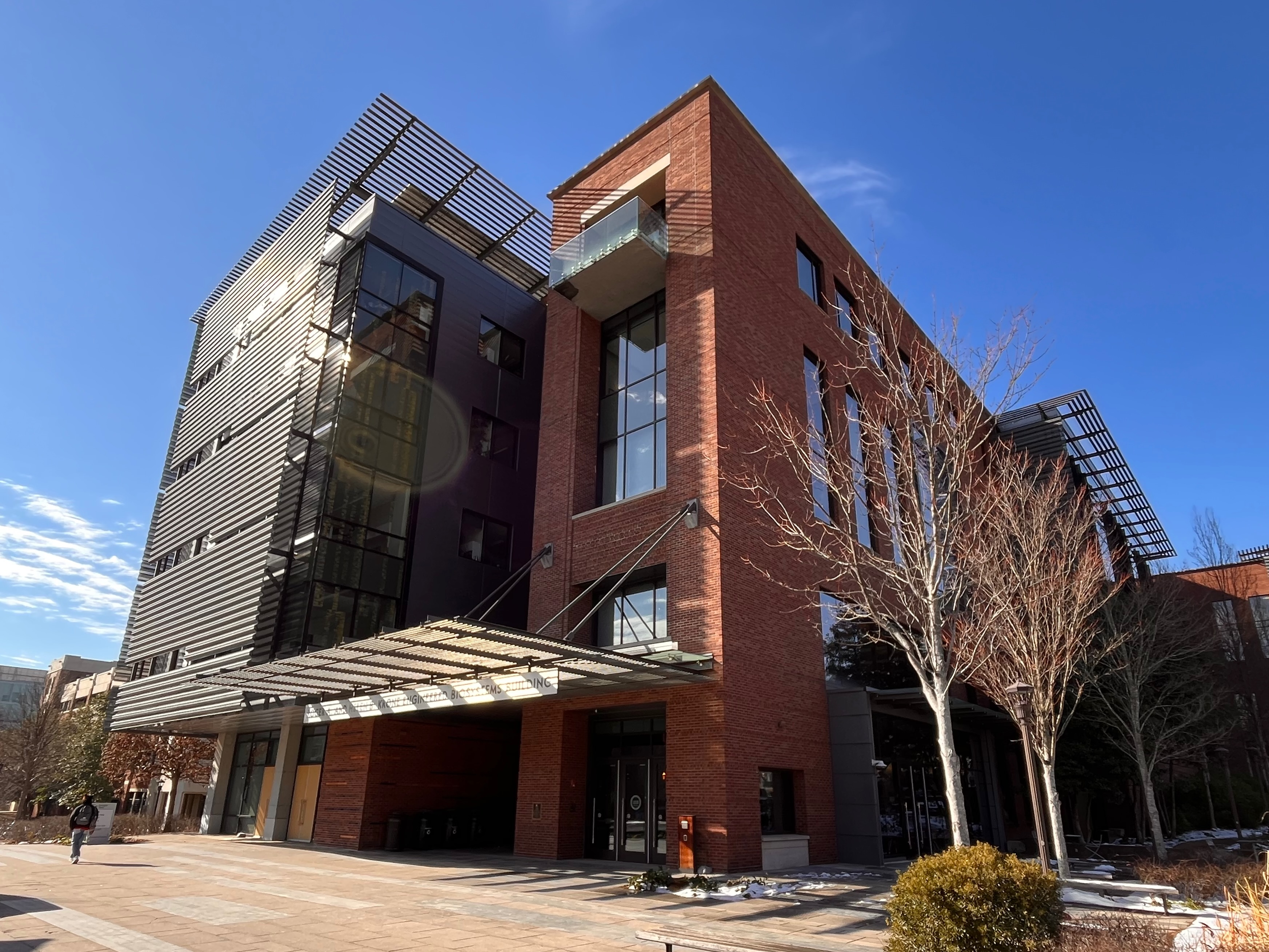
The Georgia Tech Krone Engineered Biosystems Building

The Roger A. and Helen B. Krone Engineered Biosystems Building (EBB) is an interdisciplinary facility on the North side of the campus of Georgia Tech in Atlanta, Georgia. EBB is a hub for collaboration between researchers in the fields of Chemical Biology, Cell Therapies and Systems Biology, and it houses labs and offices for nearly 40 researchers. A notable occupant of the building is the Children's Pediatric Technology Center.

A primary design requirement of the 218,880 square feet (20,335 m^{2}) building was to foster interaction between two colleges of Georgia Tech: the College of Engineering and the College of Science. The building opened on 11 September 2015, with major funding for its development and construction provided by a gift from Roger Krone and his wife Helen Krone.

The building's architects incorporated a naturally occurring nearby stream and other sources of water to provide gray water for toilet flush and to feed adjacent wetland parks. EBB's many sustainability features led it to achieving LEED Platinum and other green project certifications.
