= Parker H. Petit Institute for Bioengineering & Bioscience =

Parker H. Petit Institute for Bioengineering and Bioscience
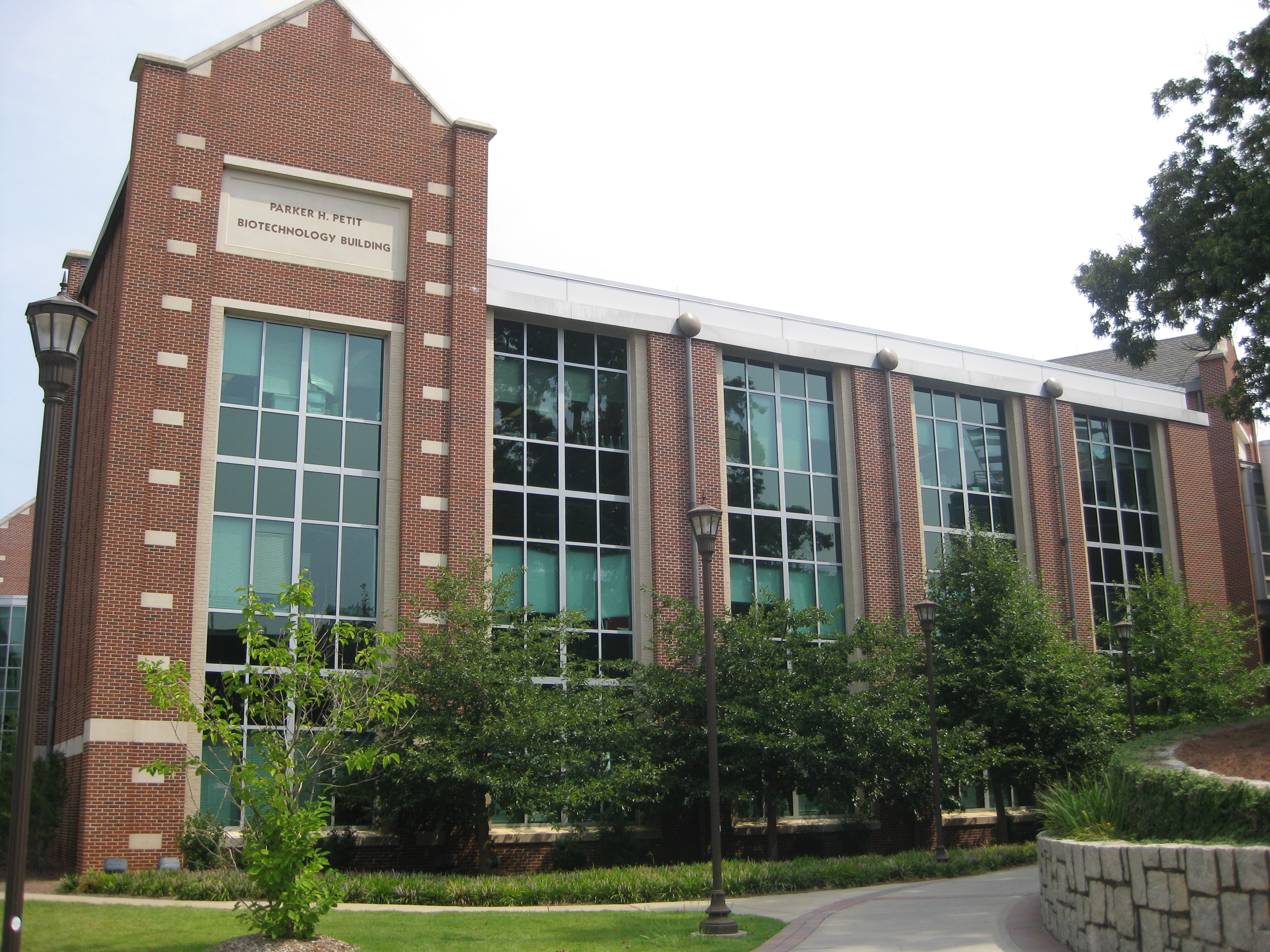
- Established: 1995
- Faculty: 200
- Location: Atlanta, Georgia, USA
- Website: petitinstitute.gatech.edu

The Parker H. Petit Institute for Bioengineering and Bioscience (IBB) is one of the ten interdisciplinary research institutes at the Georgia Institute of Technology. Established in 1995, the goal of the IBB has been to centralize and accelerate Georgia Tech's bio-research efforts. The IBB is a research center for members of the Georgia Research Alliance as well as non-member institutions such as the Morehouse School of Medicine. It also serves as the headquarters for over a dozen biomedical and bioengineering centers that conduct research in areas including pharmaceuticals, immunoengineering, cancer, heart disease, infectious diseases, and diabetes, among others.

== History ==
Beginning in 1985, Georgia Tech had begun to centralize its life sciences and bioengineering research by establishing the Bioengineering Center. Prior to that time, most of the research in these fields had been fragmented among various departments. In 1987, the Emory/Georgia Tech Biomedical Technology Research Center was established. By 1988, a group of professors whose research interests were in biochemistry and bioengineering began to organize to promote institutional initiatives to promote more interdisciplinary cooperation between the life science and bioengineering disciplines. In 1993, the Whitaker Foundation awarded one of five Biomedical Engineering Development Awards to Georgia Tech, largely in recognition of the cross-disciplinary cooperation that had emerged from these efforts, as the institute had been identified as having the potential for developing a top program in biomedical engineering.

The funding from the Whitaker Award spurred the development of a bioengineering PhD program at Georgia Tech, which was approved in 1994, and emphasized the need for a bioengineering department. Institute president Pat Crecine responded to the Whitaker Foundation's recommendations for such a department by stating that it was a future possibility, and that “we will build bioengineering at Georgia Tech not by creating a new ‘silo’, but by tearing down the walls between the existing ‘silos’". When G. Wayne Clough became institute president in 1994, the creation of a bioengineering department was pushed forward, though physical space for it was a concern. $3 million from the Whitaker Development Award was available to renovate space in an existing building on campus, but $8 million was needed to complete the project as planned. In the fall of 1994, President Clough decided that the space initially chosen for renovation was not adequate, and instead proposed an $11 million addition to the Weber Building. Plans for this expansion were developed and funds were raised over the next 12 months, but Clough again decided that a more ambitious approach was necessary for the new department's facilities. The revised plan was for a biotechnology complex on the north side of campus. A $5 million endowment from alumnus Parker H. Petit was instrumental in moving this much larger endeavor forward, and in recognition of Petit's gift, the bioengineering institute was named in his honor. The IBB building, located at the northeast corner of Atlantic Drive and Ferst Drive, opened in July 1999.

== Research centers ==
The IBB serves as headquarters for a number of biomedical and bioengineering research centers. Each center receives infrastructure support and staffing resources from the IBB.

- Atlanta Pediatric Device Consortium
- Center for Advanced Bioengineering for Soldier Survivability
- Center for Bio-Imaging Mass Spectrometry
- Center for Chemical Evolution
- Center for Drug Design Development & Delivery
- Center for Fundamental and Applied Molecular Evolution
- Center for Innovative Cardiovascular Technologies
- Center for Integrative Genomics
- Center for Nanobiology of the Macromolecular Assembly Disorders (NanoMAD)
- Center for Pharmaceutical Development
- Emergent Behavior of Integrated Cellular Systems
- Integrated Cancer Research Center
- Nanomedicine Center for Nucleoprotein Machines
- Program of Excellence in Nanotechnology - Center for Translational Cardiovascular Nanomedicine
- Regenerative Engineering and Medicine
- Ribosomal Evolution and Adaptation
- Stem Cell Engineering Center

== Facilities ==
The IBB building is a three-story, 150,000 square-foot facility located on the north side of the Georgia Tech campus. It is designed specifically to encourage and facilitate interdisciplinary research. At the core of the building is the atrium, which spans the full three stories of the structure, has a spiral staircase, and features a small restaurant, Le Petit Cafe, and artwork by Irving Geis and Karen Stoutsenberger. The high, open atrium is meant to connect the building's "research neighborhoods" of all of the different departments represented in the IBB's interdisciplinary research projects.

The IBB has 10 state-of-the-art core research facilities, which include equipment for mass spectrometry, biomechanics, biomolecular, cellular, and genome analysis, histology, magnetic resonance imaging, microcomputed tomography, microscopy and biophotonics, and pluripotent stem cell research. The IBB is home to the Center for Immunoengineering at Georgia Tech.
