= Secretaria Nacional de Ciencia y Tecnologia =

Educational body in Ecuador

The Secretaria Nacional de Ciencia y Tecnologia (National Secretariat of Science and Technology, SENACYT), is the government technical body responsible for implementing policies for science, technology, and innovation in Ecuador.

SENACYT is an autonomous agency of the Ministry of Planning and National Development. SENACYT works alongside universities and the private sector to promote applied research. The major focus of its research has been in agriculture and environmental impact on raw material extraction.

The National Secretary of Science and Technology is Dr. Ruben Berrocal; he was sworn in on July 10, 2008.

As of 2021, SENESCYT co-ordinates the National Knowledge Dialogue Project, which is striving to ensure that ancestral knowledge co-exists alongside scientific and technical knowledge.

Launched in 2018, SENESCYT's Inédita programme funds both institutional and collaborative scientific research projects. Its Network Knowledge programme aims to build academic, research, cultural and social innovation networks through events and scientific publications. To promote innovation and entrepreneurship, SENESCYT grants seed capital to social innovation projects through its Bank of Ideas programme.

== Sources ==
This article incorporates text from a free content work. Licensed under CC BY-SA 3.0 IGO Text taken from Latin America, in: UNESCO Science Report: the Race Against Time for Smarter Development., Gabriela Dutrénit, Carlos Aguirre-Bastos, Martín Puchet and Mónica Salazar, UNESCO.
