= South Downtown, Atlanta =

Neighborhood of Atlanta, Georgia, United States

South Downtown
- Neighborhood
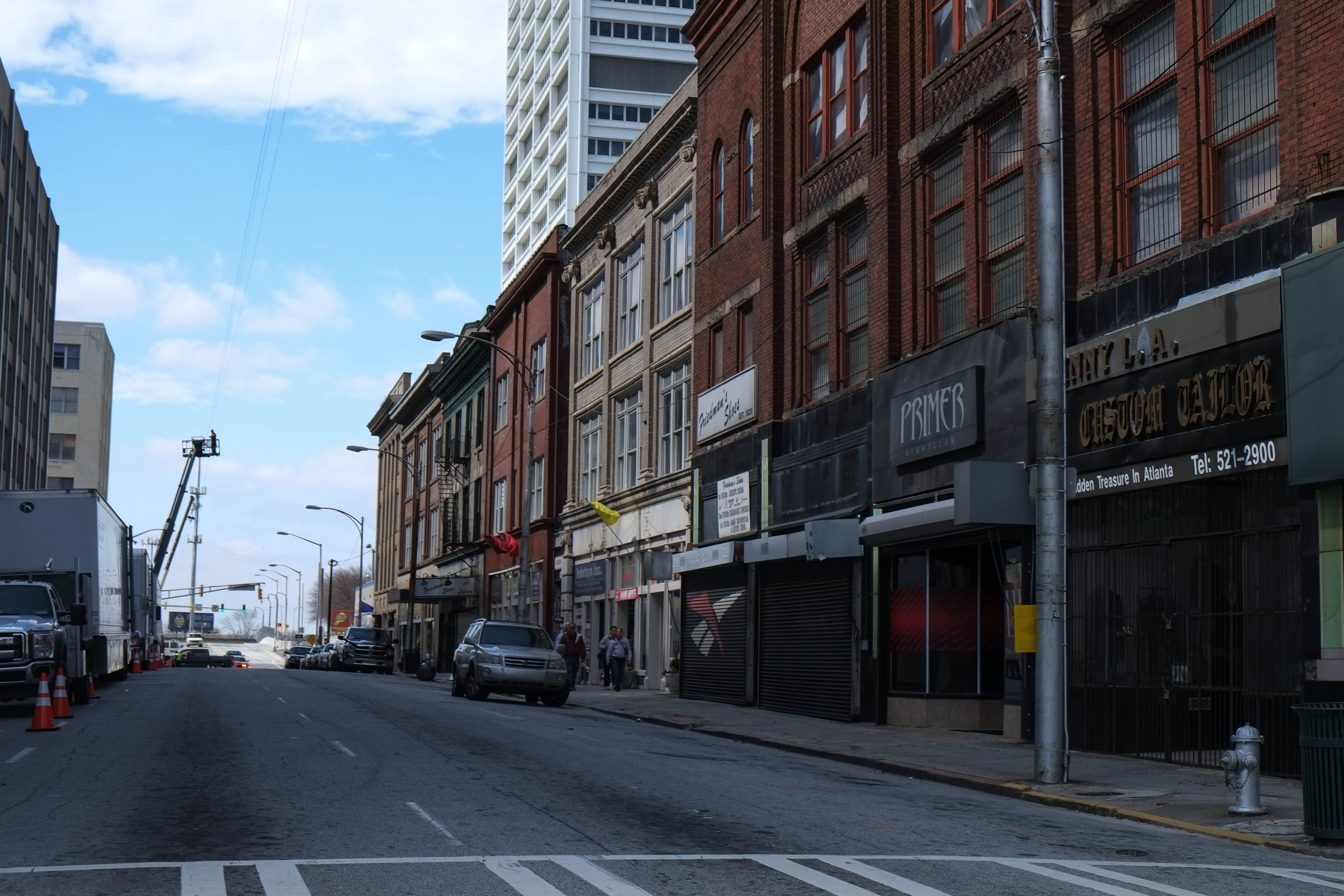
- Mitchell Street in South Downtown

- Location within Atlanta
- Coordinates: 33.7488°N 84.3935°W
- Country: United States
- State: Georgia
- County: Fulton County
- City: City of Atlanta
- Council District: 4
- NPU: M
- Districts: Historic South Downtown; Railroad District; The Gulch; Castleberry Hill; Garnett District

Area
  - Total: 1.5 sq mi (3.9 km^{2})
- Estimate

Population (2020 est.)
  - Total: 10,000
  - Density: 6,700/sq mi (2,600/km^{2})
- ZIP Codes: 30303, 30312
- Area codes: 404, 470, 678, 770

South Downtown is a historic neighborhood of Downtown Atlanta, Georgia, United States. The neighborhood was passed over during the redevelopment boom of the 1960s and 1970s that resulted in the demolition of much of Downtown's architecturally significant buildings, leaving many structures from the 1950's and earlier that retained their original facades and historic structural integrity.

The area has been historically home to city, county, state, and federal governmental offices, which prompted the city to adopt signage declaring the area "Government Walk."

Tenants as of 2026 include, Bottle Rocket, Crates record store Village Books, Smorgasburg Atlanta, Spiller Park Coffee, Tyde Tate Kitchen, El Tesoro, Glide Pizza, Broad Street BBQ, and Brewhouse Cafe. The neighborhood also includes Founders Green, a half-acre public venue, serves as a public venue for community events and screenings. In 2026, South Downtown became the first neighborhood in Atlanta to be a designated open-container entertainment district.

== Geography ==
South Downtown is bordered by I-20 to the south, Castleberry Hill to the west, Five Points to the north. South Downtown is approximately a half mile to Mercedes-Benz Stadium. The neighborhood is situated in between the Five Points and Garnett MARTA stations providing direct rail access to the broader Atlanta Metropolitan area.

Underground Atlanta and the railroad gulch ("The Gulch"), separate South Downtown from Five Points and the Hotel District. By 2026, the neighborhood had undergone significant redevelopment, emerging as a mixed-use neighborhood with retail, dining, and entertainment usage.

== History ==
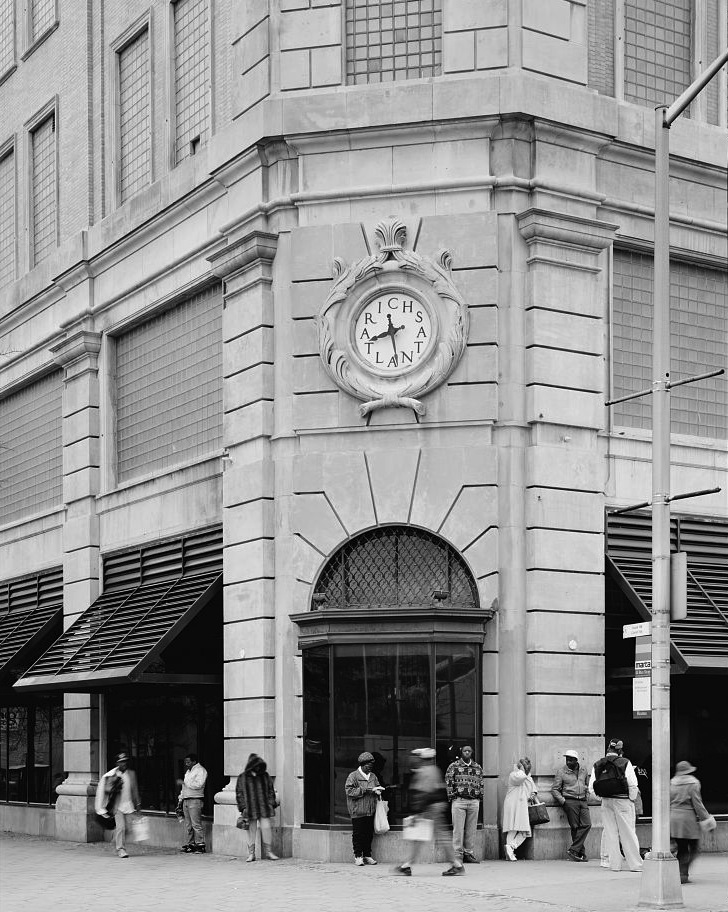
Rich's 1924 store, the anchor of the South Downtown shopping district until its closure in 1991

South Downtown was once a bustling shopping district. Whitehall Street, renamed Peachtree Street Southwest, was the principal shopping street of Atlanta from the 1850s until the mid-20th century. A source from 1854 reported that the street was "being built up with stores of brick", while Broad Street was the market district. The City of Atlanta historians refer to the area as the "Heart of Atlanta" commercial district.

In the late 19th and early 20th centuries, a cluster of department stores was located in the area. In the 1870s, the "Big Five" were Rich's, Chamberlain, Boyton, & Co., Ryan's; Keeley's; and Dougherty's; later, the J.M. High Company would join their leagues. By the 1930s, Rich's would come to dominate the South Downtown shopping district. In 1949, Whitehall was filled with five and dime stores, such as McCrory's, S. H. Kress, Woolworth's, and W. T. Grant.

As late as 1968 the northern end of Whitehall was still called a "bustling retail corridor". Today, Peachtree Street Southwest continues as a shopping area with several of the older retail buildings converted into restaurants and retail spaces. As of 2015, landmark Miller's Rexall Drugs continued its trade in hoodoo and homeopathic remedies at Broad and Mitchell streets, as it has since 1965.

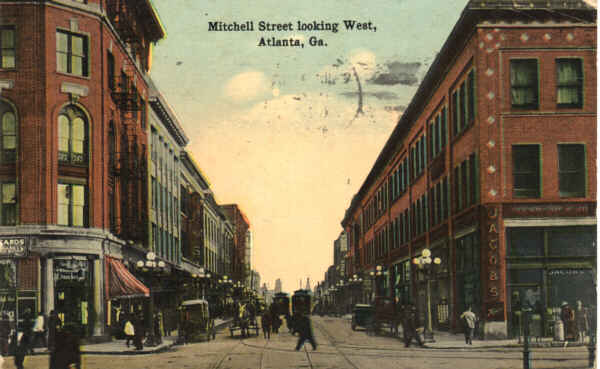
Hotel Row in the early 20th century

Located in South Downtown is Hotel Row, both a National Register and locally listed historic district consisting of one block of early 20th century commercial buildings, 3-4 stories high, located on Mitchell Street west of Forsyth Street. The building were originally hotels built to serve the needs of passengers from Terminal Station, opened in 1905 and demolished in 1971. The buildings are the most intact row of early 20th century commercial structures in the city in Atlanta's original business district. The decline of Hotel Row began in the 1920s due to the increased availability of automobile transportation and the construction of the Spring Street viaduct, which made getting to hotels in the northern part of the city easier.

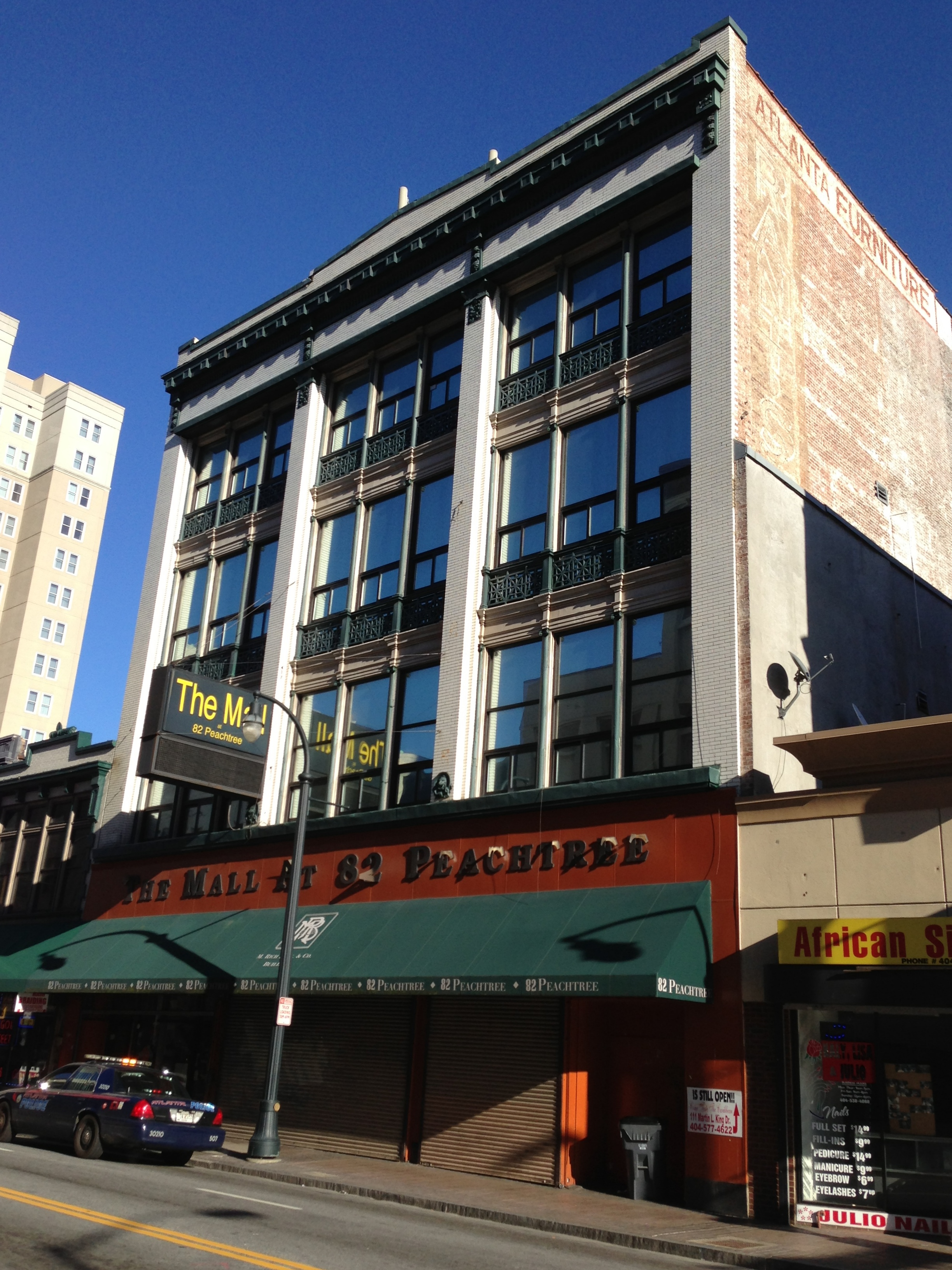
Rich's 1906 building at what is now 82 Peachtree St. SE, as seen in 2013

== Government facilities ==
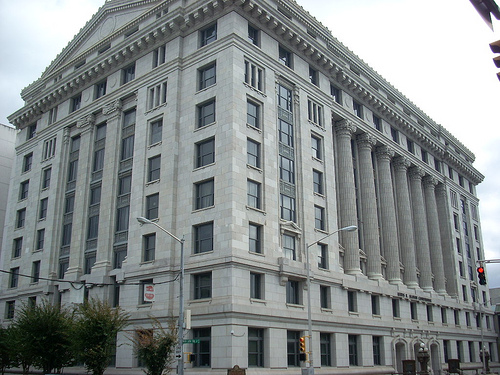
The exterior of the Fulton County Courthouse, located at 136 Pryor Street SW

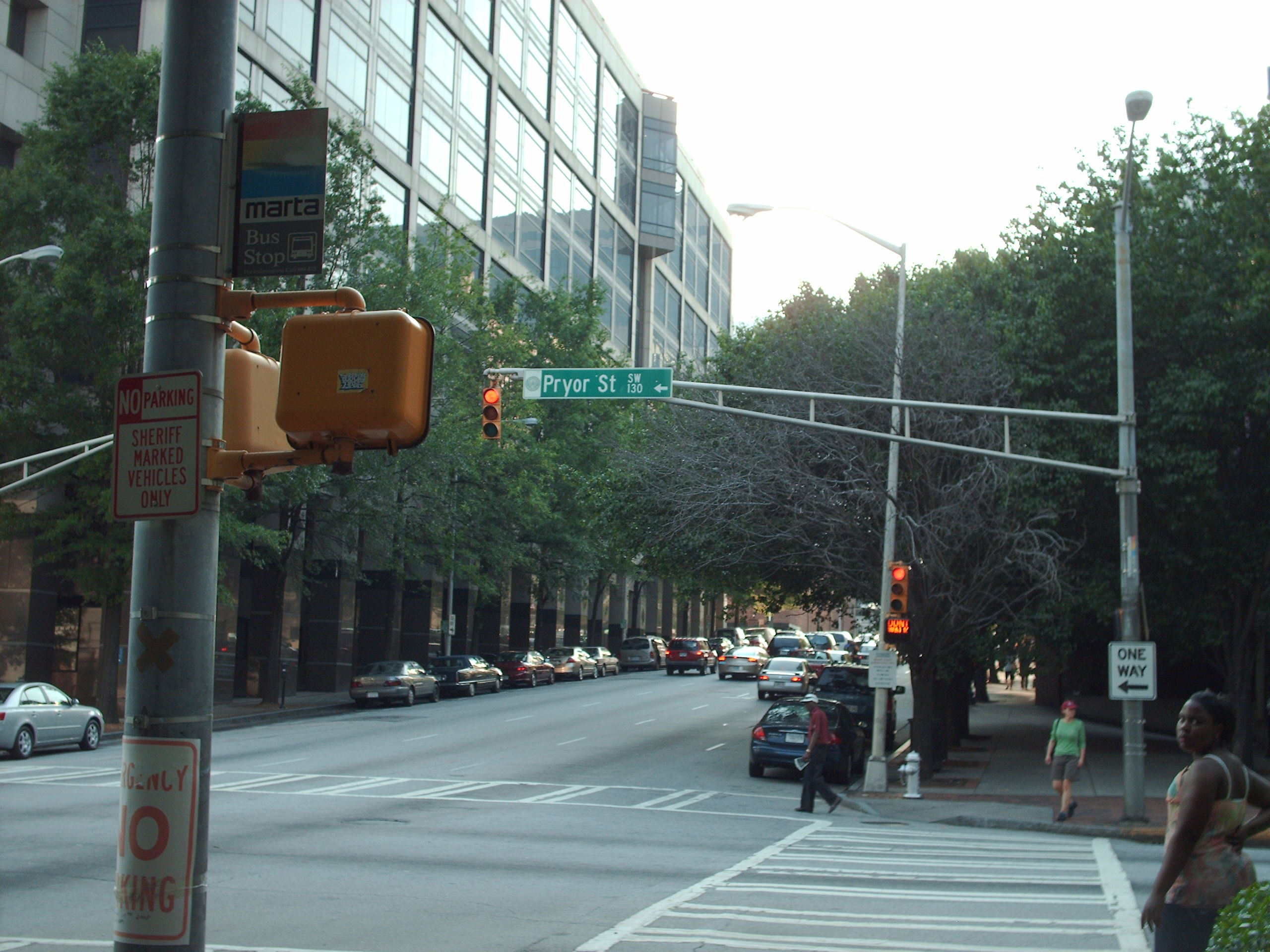
Pryor Street, with the Fulton County Government Center building to the left

South Downtown is home to the governmental facilities of the City of Atlanta, Fulton County, and the State of Georgia. South Downtown is also home to federal government offices. This concentration of governmental facilities influenced the city's decision to market the area as "Government Walk." A list of the most well known government buildings in this district are:

- Atlanta City Hall
- Georgia State Capitol
- Fulton County Courthouse
- Martin Luther King Jr. Federal Building
- Sam Nunn Atlanta Federal Center
- Richard B. Russell Federal Building

To the east of Central Avenue, aside from the Georgia State Capitol, many State of Georgia offices are located in this district, such as the Georgia Department of Transportation (GDOT), Georgia Department of Agriculture, and the Georgia Supreme Court.

== Transportation ==
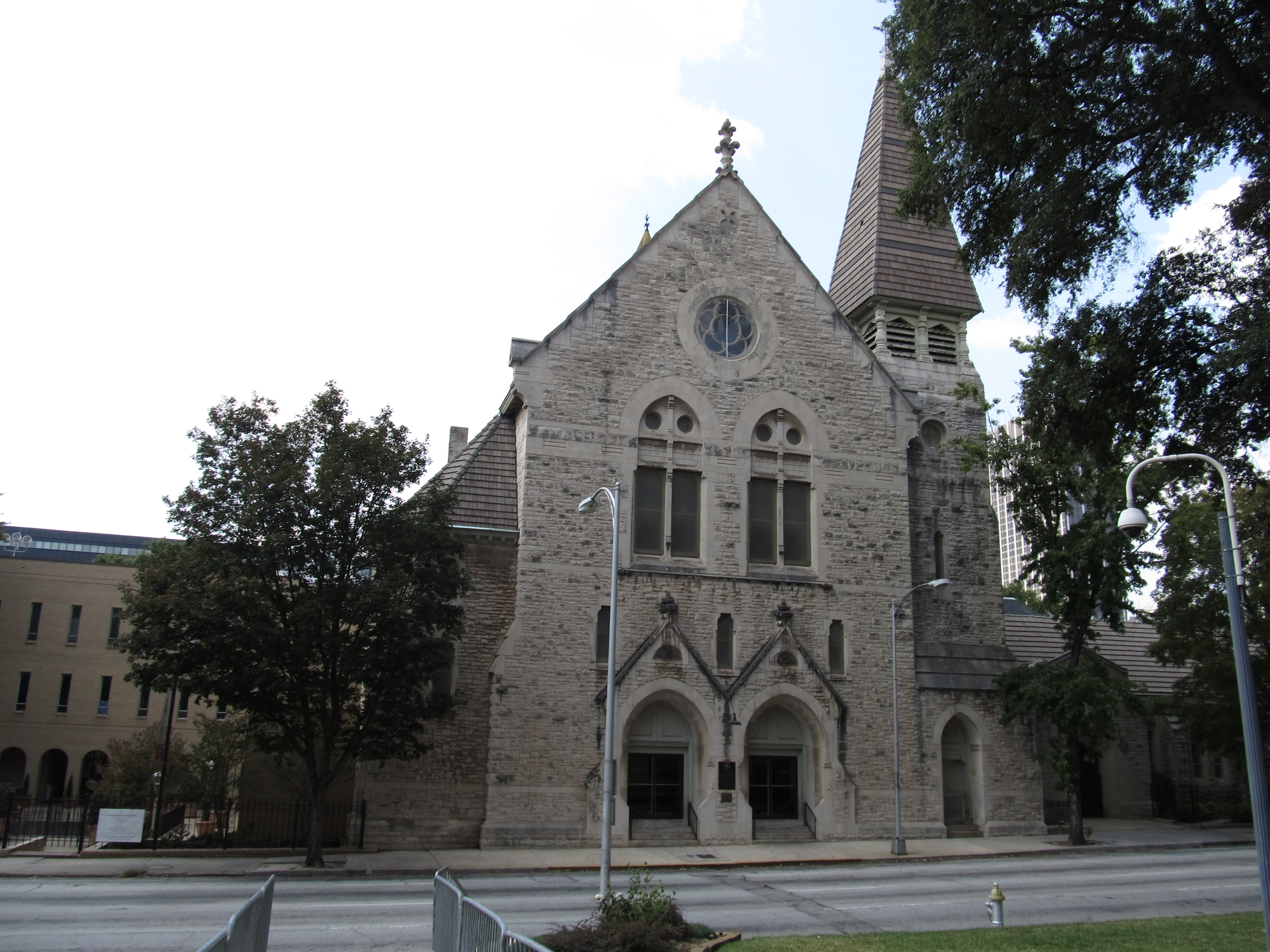
Central Presbyterian Church, located across from the Georgia State Capitol

MARTA provides public transportation to the district through the Garnett Transit Station, located on Peachtree Street, and Georgia State Station, located on Piedmont Avenue.

Many commuters from the southern suburbs who work in Downtown travel on South Downtown's streets when heading to work. Many streets in this district are one-way, similar to the other districts that make up Downtown.

- Peachtree Street, south of the railroad gulch, has a multitude of stores along its stretch between Alabama Street and Martin Luther King Jr. Drive. It is the primary two way north-south street in this district.
- Trinity Avenue and Memorial Drive are the only two-way streets in South Downtown that run east and west. Trinity Avenue is signed as Georgia State Route (SR) 154 until it ends at Memorial Drive near Capitol Avenue at the eastern end of the South Downtown, where Memorial Drive becomes Georgia SR 154.
- Central Avenue is a primary northbound street through the district. It is the main route for commuters into Downtown from the southern suburbs. The Fulton County Justice Center is located at 185 Central Avenue SW.
- Pryor Street is a primary southbound street through the district. It is one of the routes out of Downtown when commuters head back to the southern and western suburbs. The Fulton County Courthouse is located at 136 Pryor Street SW and the Fulton County Government Center is located at 141 Pryor Street SW.
