= Heart of Atlanta =

Heart of Atlanta may refer to:

- The original business district of Atlanta, now part of South Downtown
- Heart of Atlanta Motel v. United States, a trial
