= Woodruff Park =

Park in Atlanta, Georgia

Coordinates: 33°45′18″N 84°23′20″W

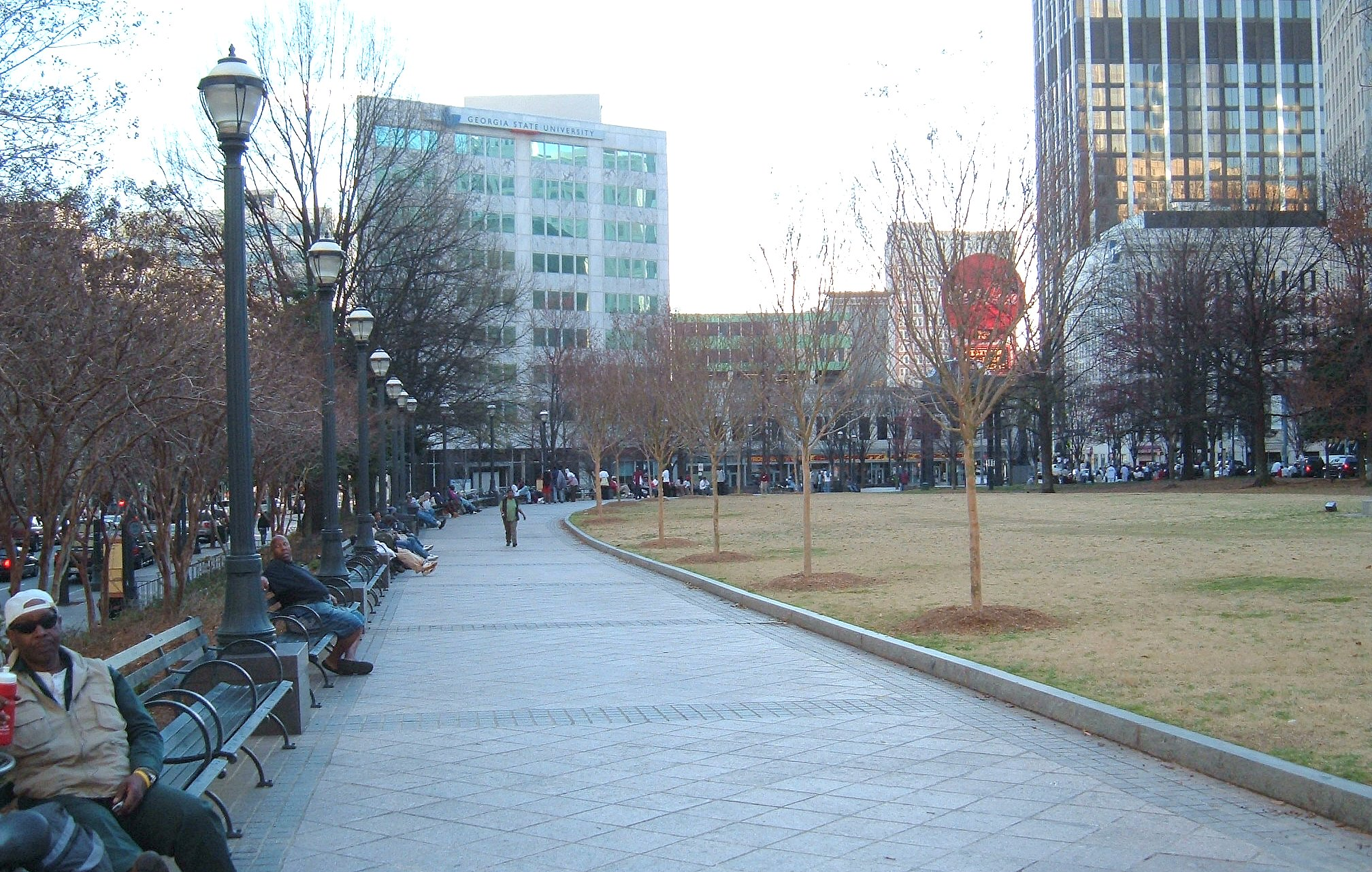
Wide sidewalk along the park's east side

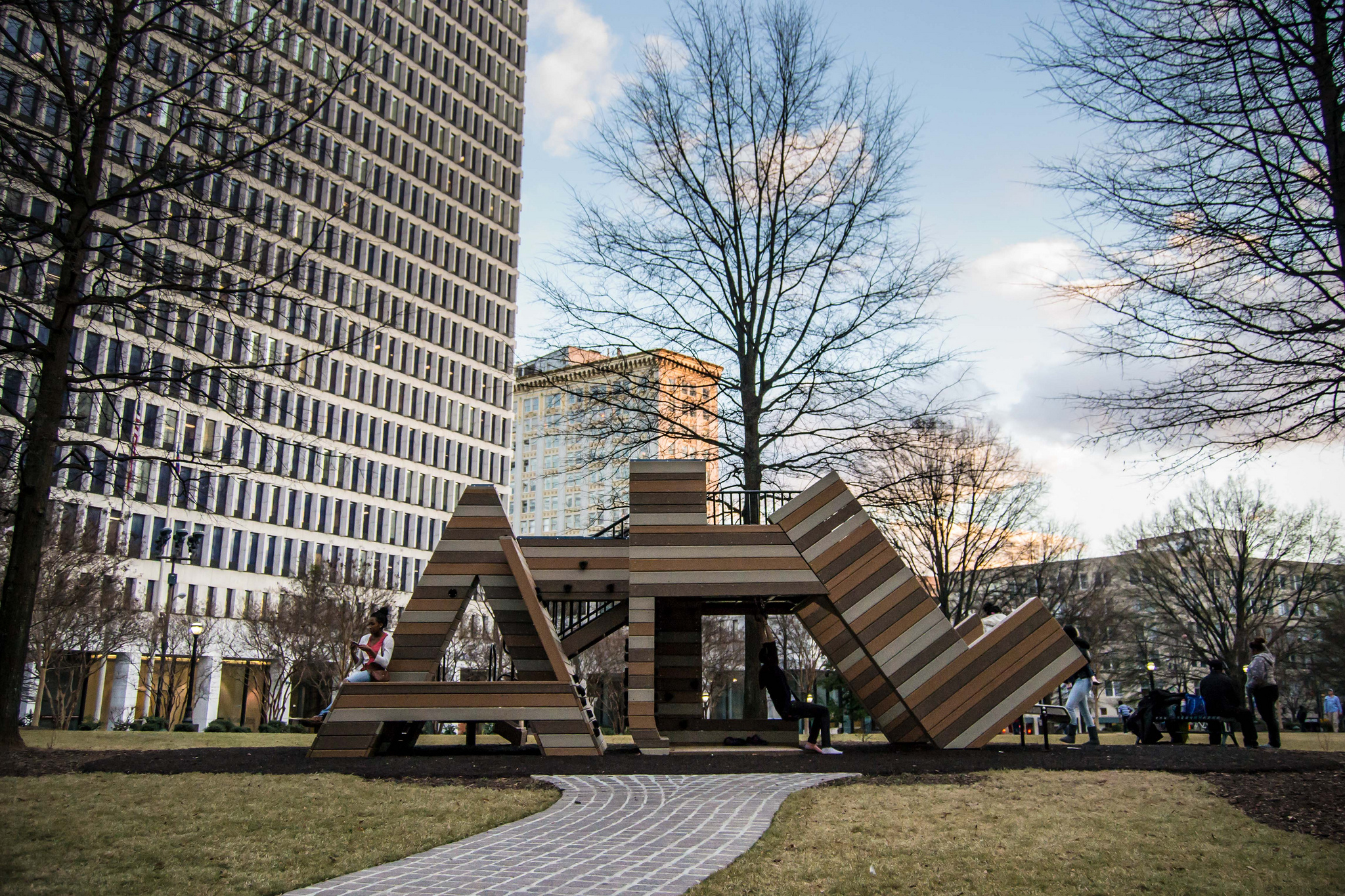
Playground spelling "ATL" in Woodruff Park

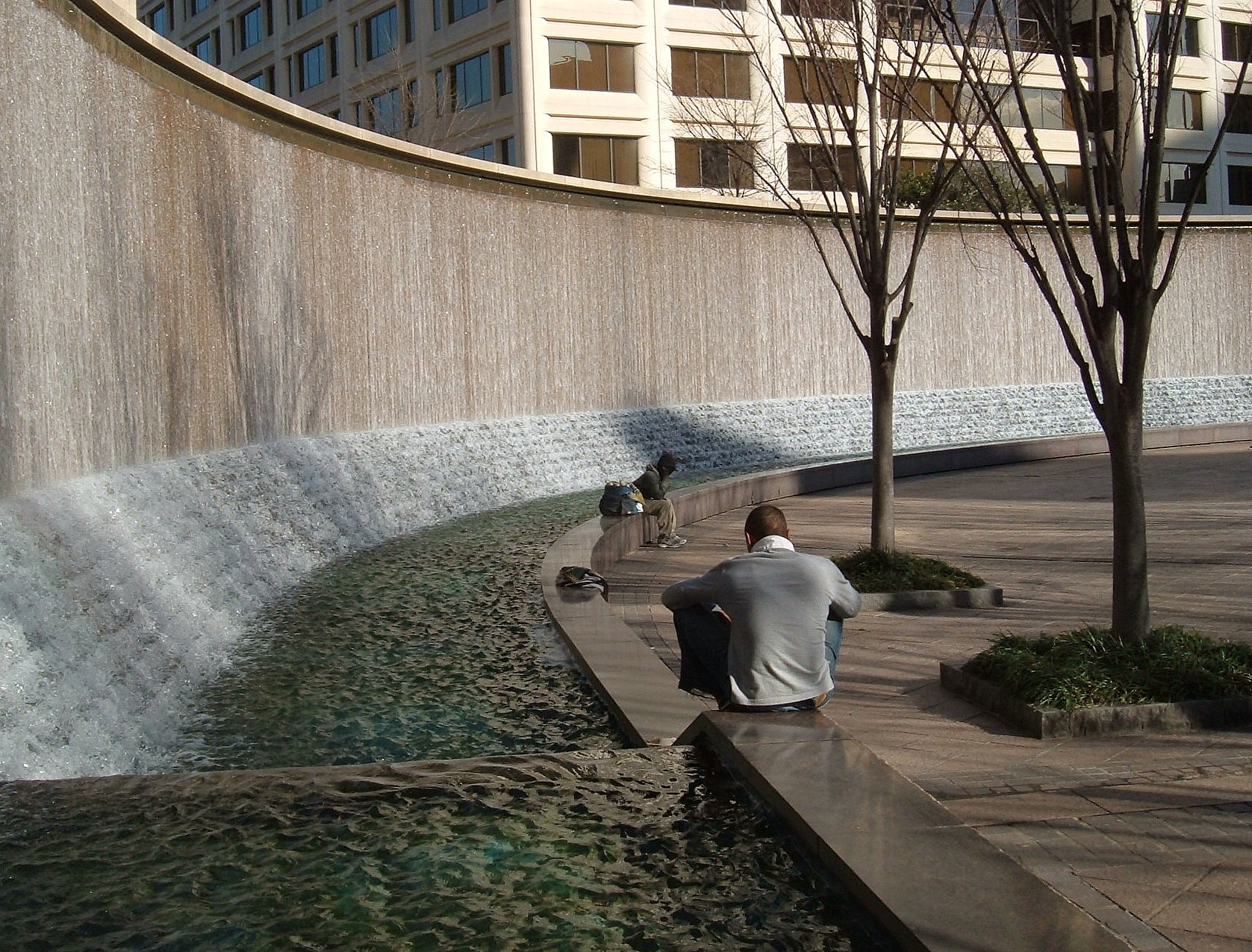
International Peace Fountain on the park's northern edge

Woodruff Park, named for Robert W. Woodruff, is located in the heart of Downtown Atlanta, Georgia. The park's 6 acres (2.4 ha) are north of Edgewood Ave, between Peachtree Street NE and Park Place NE. The park includes a fountain, a performance pavilion, and several monuments.

== History ==
The original 4 acres (1.6 ha) between Peachtree Street, Edgewood Avenue, Pryor St. (now Park Place) and the Candler Building were purchased anonymously by Mr. Woodruff then donated to the city in 1971 and the first incarnation of the park, Central City Park, opened in 1973. It was later revealed that Robert W. Woodruff had donated the funds for the park and it was renamed in his honor in 1985. In 1995, during the lead-up to the Centennial Olympic Games, the International Peace Fountain was constructed in the park.

Woodruff Park has been the site of many demonstrations and rallies.

== Phoenix statue ==
A bronze sculpture, Atlanta from the Ashes (The Phoenix), depicts a woman releasing a phoenix, a symbol of Atlanta's rise from the ashes after being burnt to the ground by William T. Sherman's Union armies during the Civil War. Atlanta from the Ashes (The Phoenix) was a gift of the Rich Foundation in commemoration of the 100th anniversary of Rich's Department store. The sculpture was designed by James Seigler, sculpted by Gamba Quirino, and fabricated by Feruccia Vezzoni in 1969. Atlanta from the Ashes (The Phoenix) was originally located on a viaduct adjacent to the first Rich's Department store on Martin Luther King Jr. Drive, S.W. & Spring Street, S.W., Atlanta, Georgia from 1969 to 1995. In 1995, the sculpture was restored and moved to its current location in Woodruff Park.

== Transportation ==
Woodruff Park is served by the Atlanta Streetcar at two stations: one called Woodruff Park, and another called Park Place.
