= Atlanta from the Ashes (The Phoenix) =

Monument in Atlanta, Georgia, US

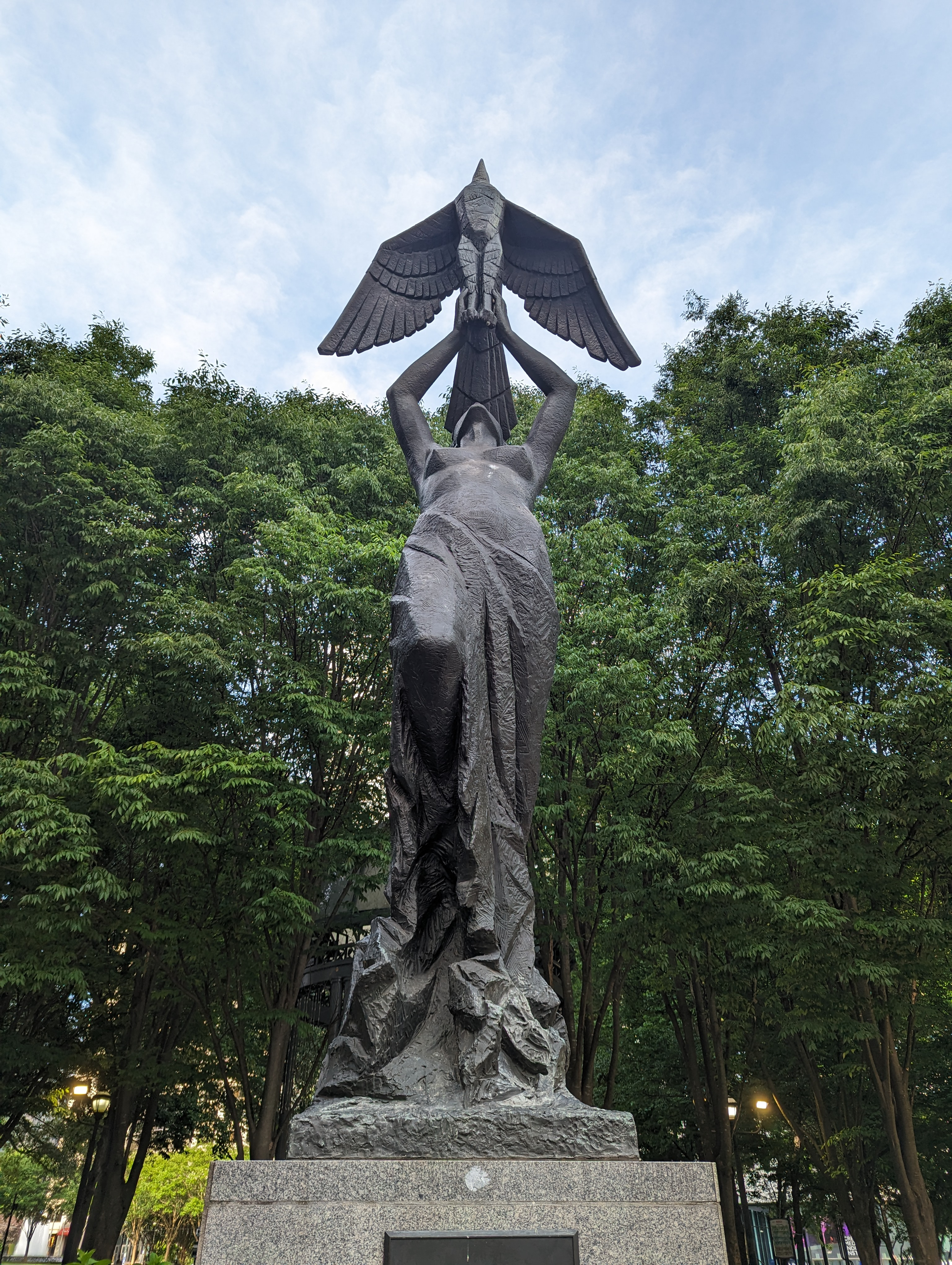
- The statue in 2024
- Artist: James Seigler
- Year: 1969
- Type: Bronze
- Location: Atlanta; 33°45′16.72″N 84°23′21.37″W

Atlanta from the Ashes, more commonly known as The Phoenix, is a bronze monument located in Atlanta, Georgia, United States, symbolizing Atlanta's rise from the ashes of the Civil War to become a world city. The sculpture, dedicated in 1969, depicts a woman being lifted from flames by a phoenix, in reference to the phoenix of Greco-Roman mythology that was consumed by fire and rose from the ashes, just as Atlanta rose from the ashes after the city's infrastructure was burned by William T. Sherman's Union Army during the Civil War in the Atlanta campaign and the March to the Sea. The female figure has long hair and is seen nude above the waist, looking upward. In her raised arms she holds the legs of a gilded phoenix. The sculpture is mounted on a rectangular base. The monument is located in Woodruff Park, located in Downtown Atlanta.

The monument was a gift of the Rich Foundation in commemoration of the 100th anniversary of Rich's Department store. The sculpture was designed by James Seigler, of Houston, Texas, but it was both sculpted and fabricated in Italy, by Gamba Quirino, and Feruccia Vezzoni, respectively. The monument was originally located on a viaduct adjacent to the first Rich's Department store on Martin Luther King Jr. Drive at Spring Street from 1969 to 1995. In 1995, the sculpture was restored and moved to its current location in Woodruff Park.

Since its creation, the sculpture has become an iconic symbol of Atlanta's rise from out of the ashes and destruction of the Civil War to become one of the most important international cities.

== Gallery ==
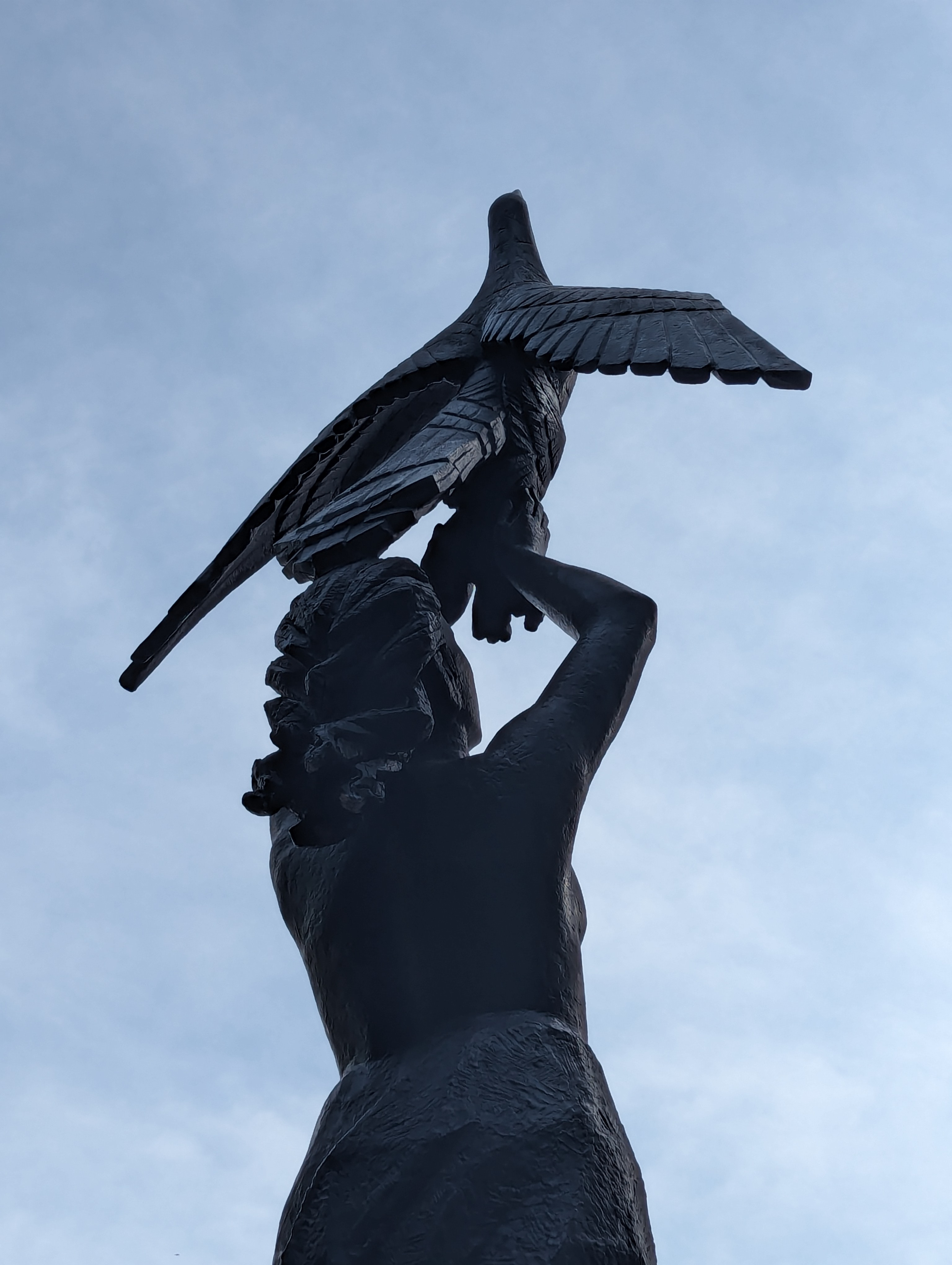
Seen from behind

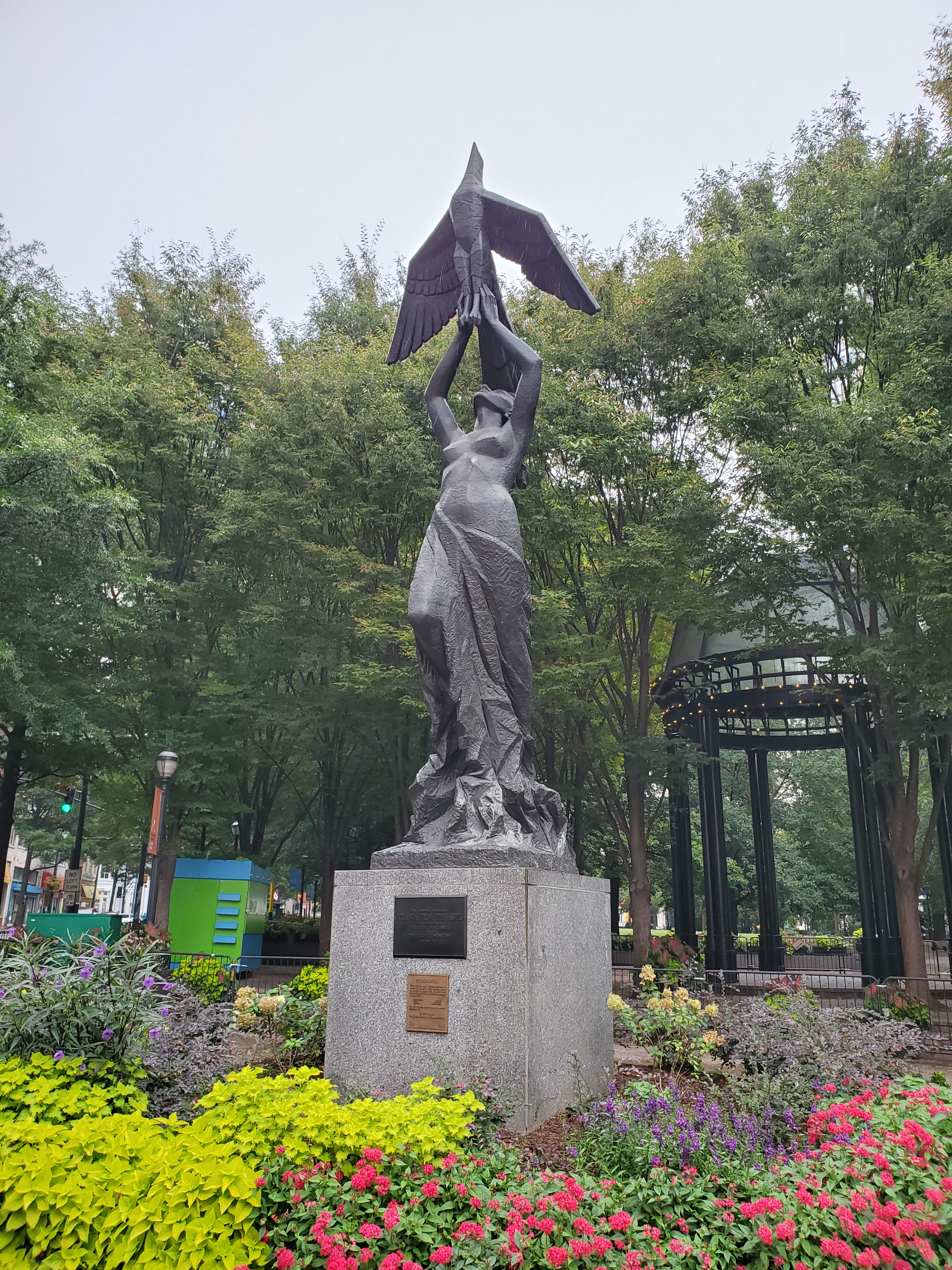
With view of Woodruff Park in the background

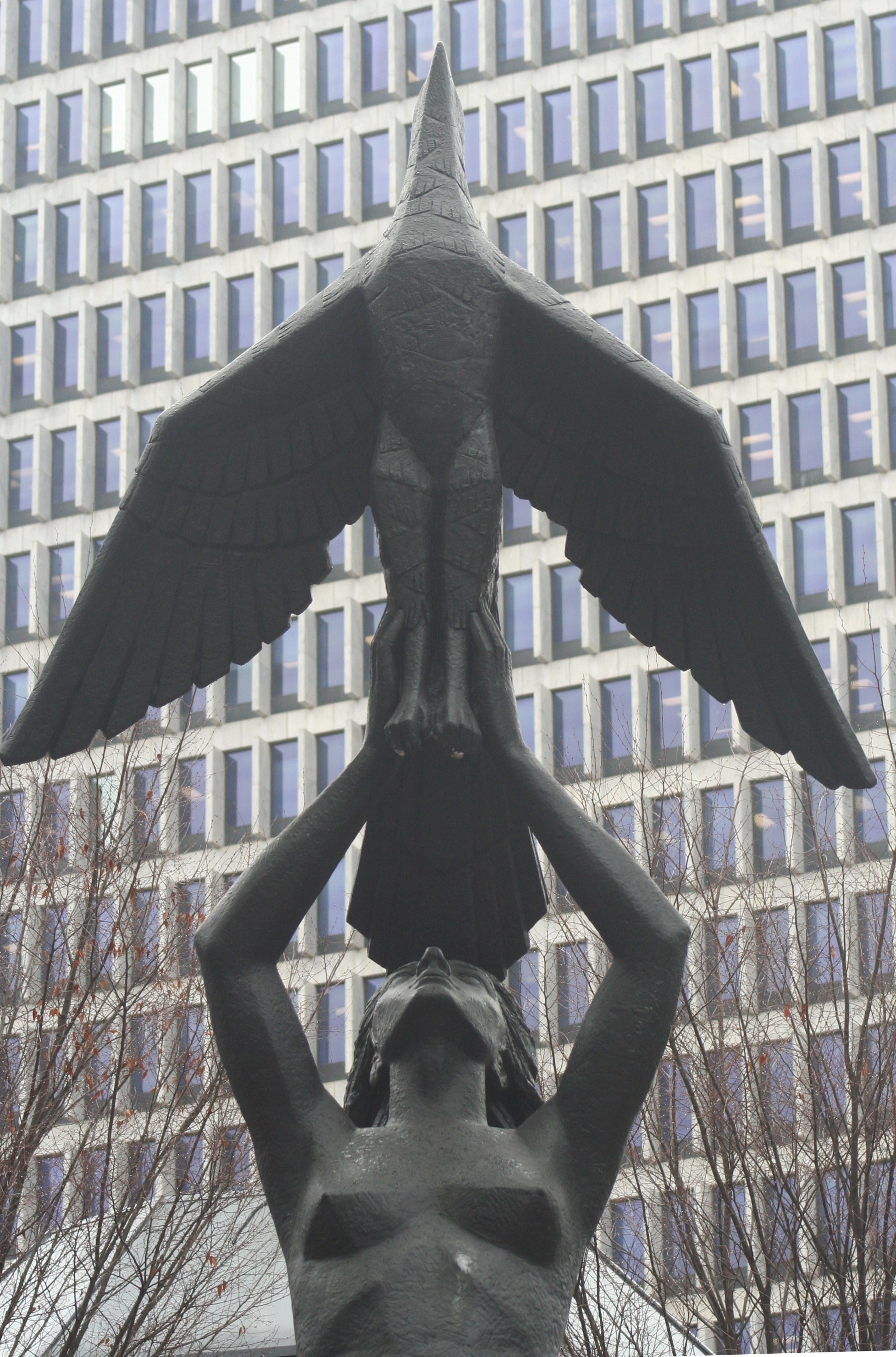
Detail on the head and bird

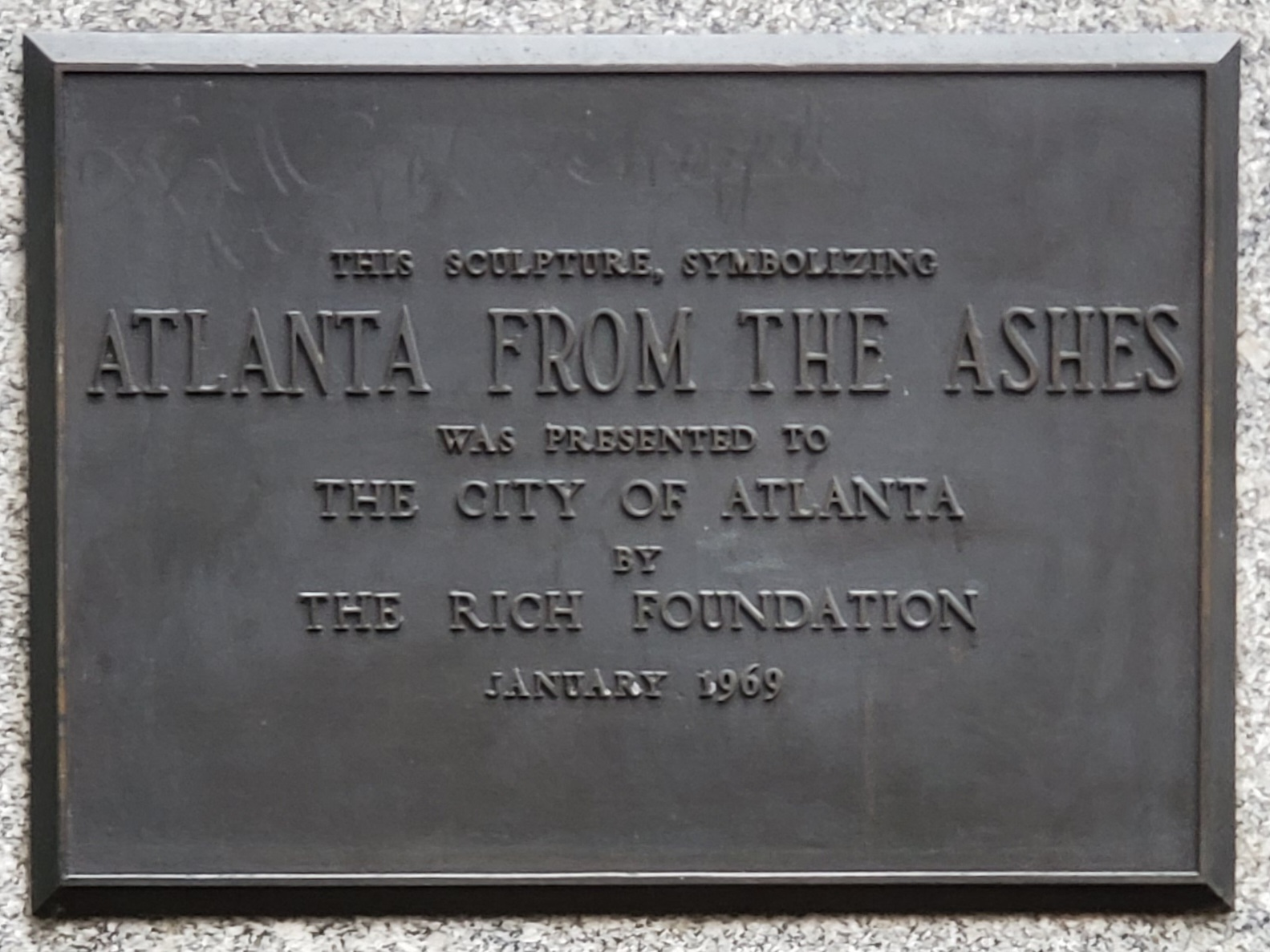
The statue's plaque
