= Downtown Atlanta =

Central business district of Atlanta, Georgia

- Central business district
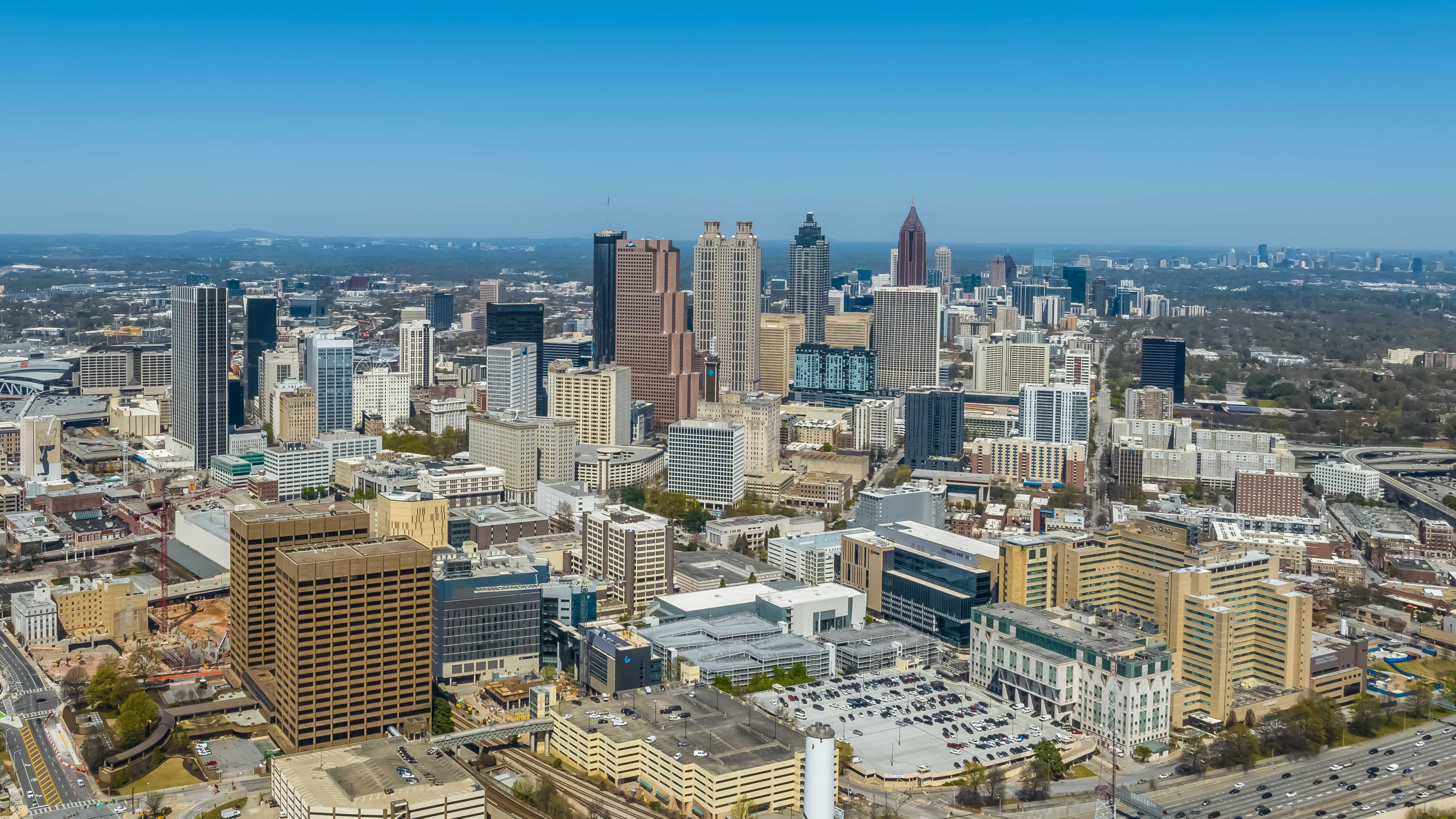
- Downtown Atlanta skyline in 2025

- Location in Metro Atlanta
- Coordinates: 33°45′18″N 84°23′24″W
- Country: United States
- State: Georgia
- City: Atlanta

Area
  - Total: 4.00 sq mi (10.4 km^{2})
- Elevation: 738–1,050 ft (225–320 m)

Population (2017)
  - Total: 26,850
  - Density: 6,680/sq mi (2,581/km^{2})
- Time zone: UTC-5 (EST)
  - Summer (DST): UTC-4 (EDT)
- Website: https://www.atlantadowntown.com/

Downtown Atlanta is the central business district of Atlanta, Georgia, United States of America. The largest of the city's three commercial districts (Midtown and Buckhead being the others), it is the location of many corporate and regional headquarters; city, county, state, and federal government facilities; Georgia State University; sporting venues; and most of Atlanta's tourist attractions. It measures approximately four square miles, and had 26,850 residents as of 2017. Like many urban central business districts in the US, it has recently seen an influx of investment and energy that includes the construction of new condos and lofts, renovation of historic buildings, and arrival of new residents and businesses.

== Geography ==
Downtown is bound by North Avenue to the north, Boulevard to the east, Interstate 20 to the south, and Northside Drive to the west. This definition includes central areas like Five Points, the Hotel District, and Fairlie-Poplar, and outer neighborhoods such as SoNo and Castleberry Hill.

The Atlanta Downtown Improvement District (ADID) organization, though, defines a much smaller downtown area measuring just one and two tenths square miles. This area is roughly bound by North Avenue to the north, Piedmont Avenue and the Downtown Connector to the east, Martin Luther King Jr Drive, Courtland Street, and Edgewood Avenue to the south, and the railroad tracks to the west. This area only includes the core central business district neighborhoods of Fairlie-Poplar, Five Points, the Hotel District, Centennial Hill, and South Downtown.

== History ==
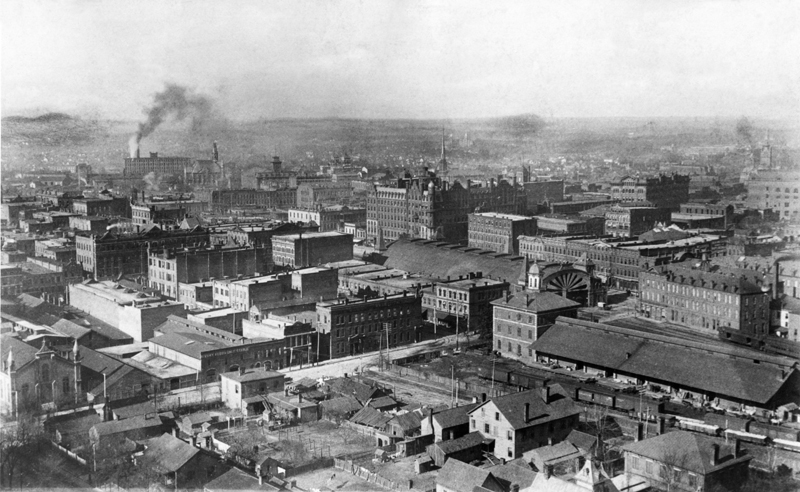
Downtown Atlanta, 1889

The history of downtown began in 1826 with Wilson Lumpkin and Hamilton Fulton surveying a possible canal route between Chattanooga, Tennessee, and Milledgeville, Georgia's capital at the time. In 1833, Lumpkin, who had become governor, requested that the state legislature charter three railroad lines. By 1836, the state-financed Western and Atlantic Railroad, linking the middle of Georgia to the other states north and west, was granted a charter by the legislature, which was signed into law by Lumpkin. As a result, the town named Terminus was founded in 1837, named for the end of the railroad line. Terminus received a name change in 1842 when the town's 30 inhabitants voted to change the town's name to Marthasville, in honor of Governor Lumpkin's daughter.

By 1845, John Edgar Thomson, chief engineer of the Georgia Railroad, suggested that Marthasville's name be changed. The first suggestion was "Atlantica-Pacifica", which was shortened to "Atlanta". In 1847, Atlanta was incorporated, with the town limits extending in a one-mile (1.6 km) radius from the mile marker at the railroad depot.

By the outbreak of the Civil War, Atlanta was a major railroad hub and manufacturing center, making it a target for the Union Army. In 1864, General William T. Sherman burned Atlanta to the ground during his March to the Sea, making Atlanta the only major American city to be destroyed by war.

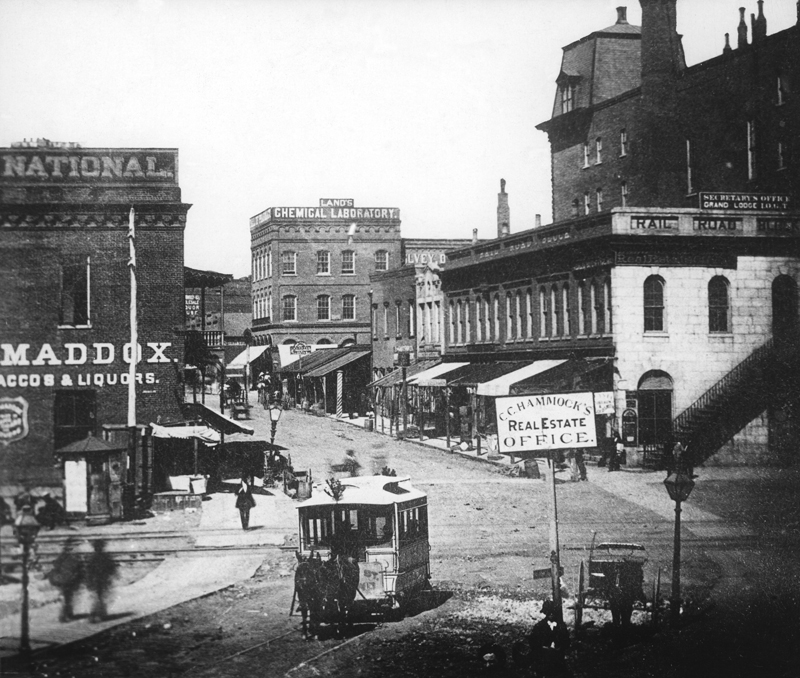
Peachtree Street, 1882

Atlanta's first resurgence began during Reconstruction. In 1868, Georgia's state capital was moved to the city from Milledgeville. By the 1920s, a downtown business sector ringed by residential districts had emerged.

Professional sports came to Atlanta in 1965 with the construction of Atlanta–Fulton County Stadium and the relocation of the Braves from Milwaukee. The National Football League awarded the city the Falcons expansion team in 1966. The Hawks arrived in 1968, even though Omni Coliseum, the city's basketball arena, did not open until 1972. Two of the teams continue to play their home games downtown at Mercedes-Benz Stadium and State Farm Arena.

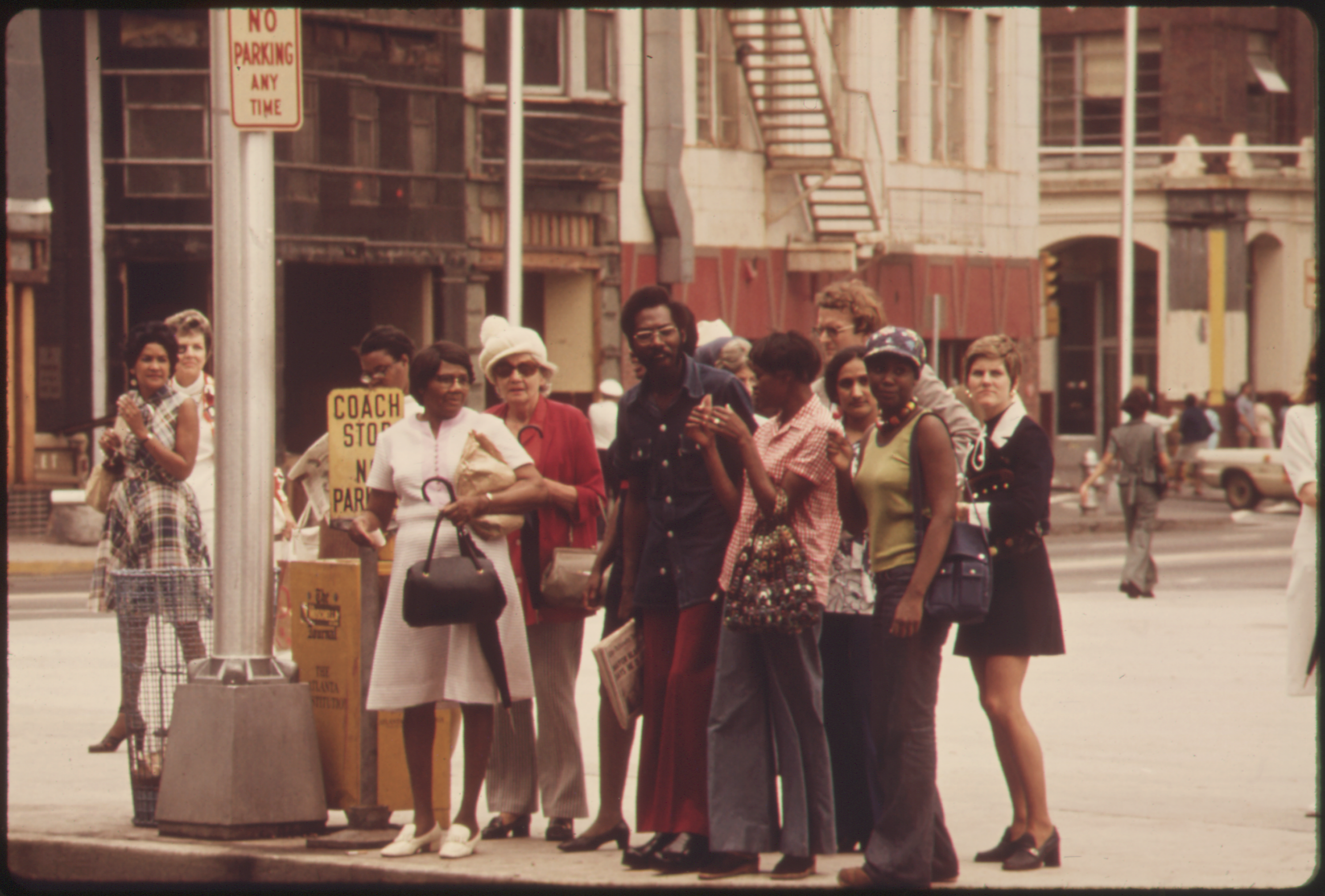
Downtown commuters waiting for a bus in 1974

Business growth in the 1970s resulted in significant development in Downtown, most notably in Peachtree Center and the Hotel District. Economic development in these areas shifted the commercial center of the city to an area along Peachtree Street that was north of Five Points, however, despite the construction of the MARTA central station there in 1975. By the mid-1980s, Peachtree Center had become the core of a dedicated hotel-convention district that lay at the heart of the Downtown economy, even as the remainder of Downtown Atlanta deteriorated markedly.

The closure of Underground Atlanta in 1979 due to an increase in crime contributed to perceptions that Downtown was dangerous, and the 1980s saw a significant decline in population. By 1990, Five Points was a "vacant shell of its former self," while Downtown as a whole was largely an "archepelagic assemblage of fortified enclaves inhabited in the daylight hours by government office workers, conventioners, and college students, and in the night by a substantial population of homeless persons."

The 1996 Olympic Games, along with the transformation of Georgia State University from a commuter school to a traditional college, initiated a resurgence of Downtown that continues today. They resulted in Centennial Olympic Park, which was built as a physical memorial to the games in the former industrial area west of Five Points. In the following decade, Centennial Olympic Park spurred the creation of a Downtown tourist district anchored by the World of Coca-Cola, the Georgia Aquarium, the CNN Center, the Center for Civil and Human Rights, and the College Football Hall of Fame. Following the 1996 games, Georgia State University president Carl Patton, an urban planner, initiated a university-led transformation of Downtown that sought to make Georgia State "a part of the city, not apart from the city." Dubbed the Main Street Master Plan, Patton's vision has been executed through billions of dollars of urban construction, boosting Downtown's economy and population.

On March 14, 2008, at approximately 9:40 pm Eastern Daylight Time, an EF2 tornado hit Downtown with winds up to 135 miles per hour (217 km/h). It caused damage to Philips Arena, the Georgia Dome, Centennial Olympic Park, the Westin Peachtree Plaza Hotel, the CNN Center, and the Georgia World Congress Center. It was the first time a tornado touched ground in Downtown since weather record keeping began in the 1880s. While there were dozens of injuries, there was only one fatality.

== Cityscape ==
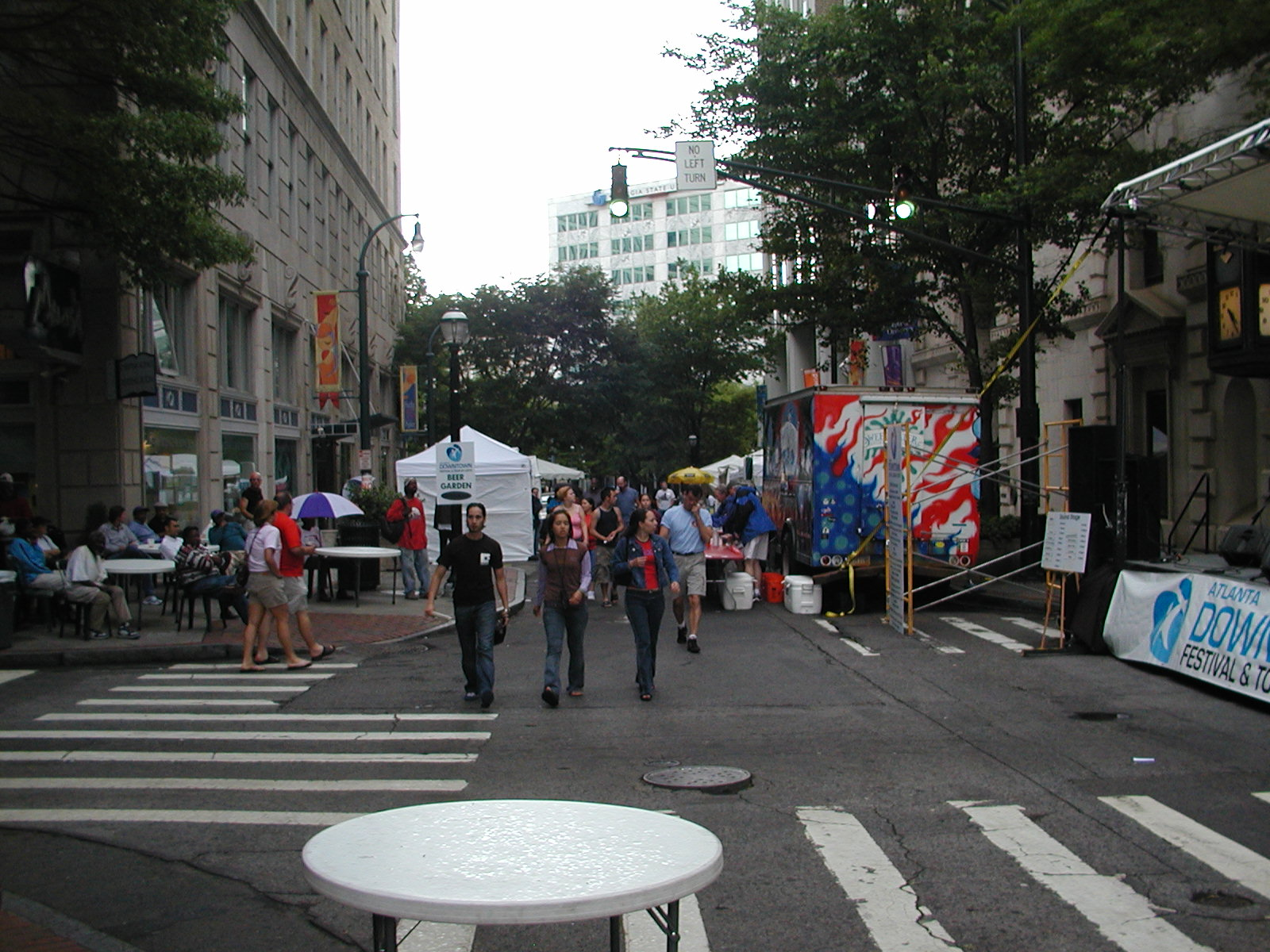
Atlanta Downtown Festival and Tour

Downtown contains some of the tallest buildings in Atlanta. The tallest building in Atlanta, the Bank of America Plaza building, is situated between Midtown and Downtown. Rising at 1,023 feet (312 m), the Bank of America Plaza is also the tallest building in any of the U.S. state capitals, and one of the tallest buildings in the United States outside of New York City and Chicago.

Downtown is the heart and the largest of the three business districts of the city. This area contains striking architecture dating as far back as the 19th century. Some of the most famous and/or tallest buildings in Downtown include:

- Westin Peachtree Plaza Hotel
- Georgia-Pacific Tower
- Flatiron Building
- Truist Plaza
- 191 Peachtree Tower
- Centennial Tower (or known as 101 Marietta)
- Equitable Building
- Healey Building
- Bank of America Plaza
- Candler Building
- Hurt Building
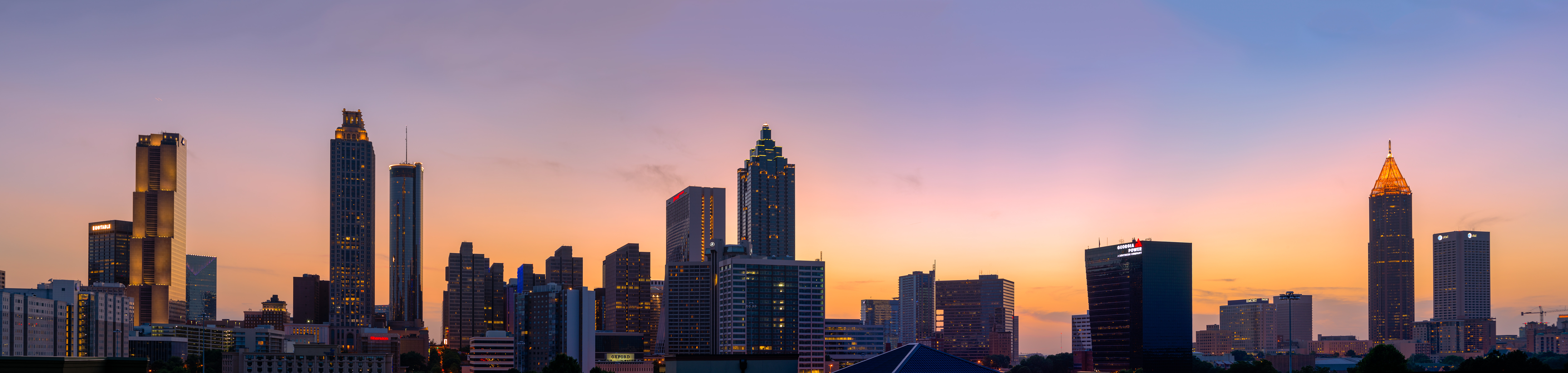
The Downtown skyline

=== Districts ===
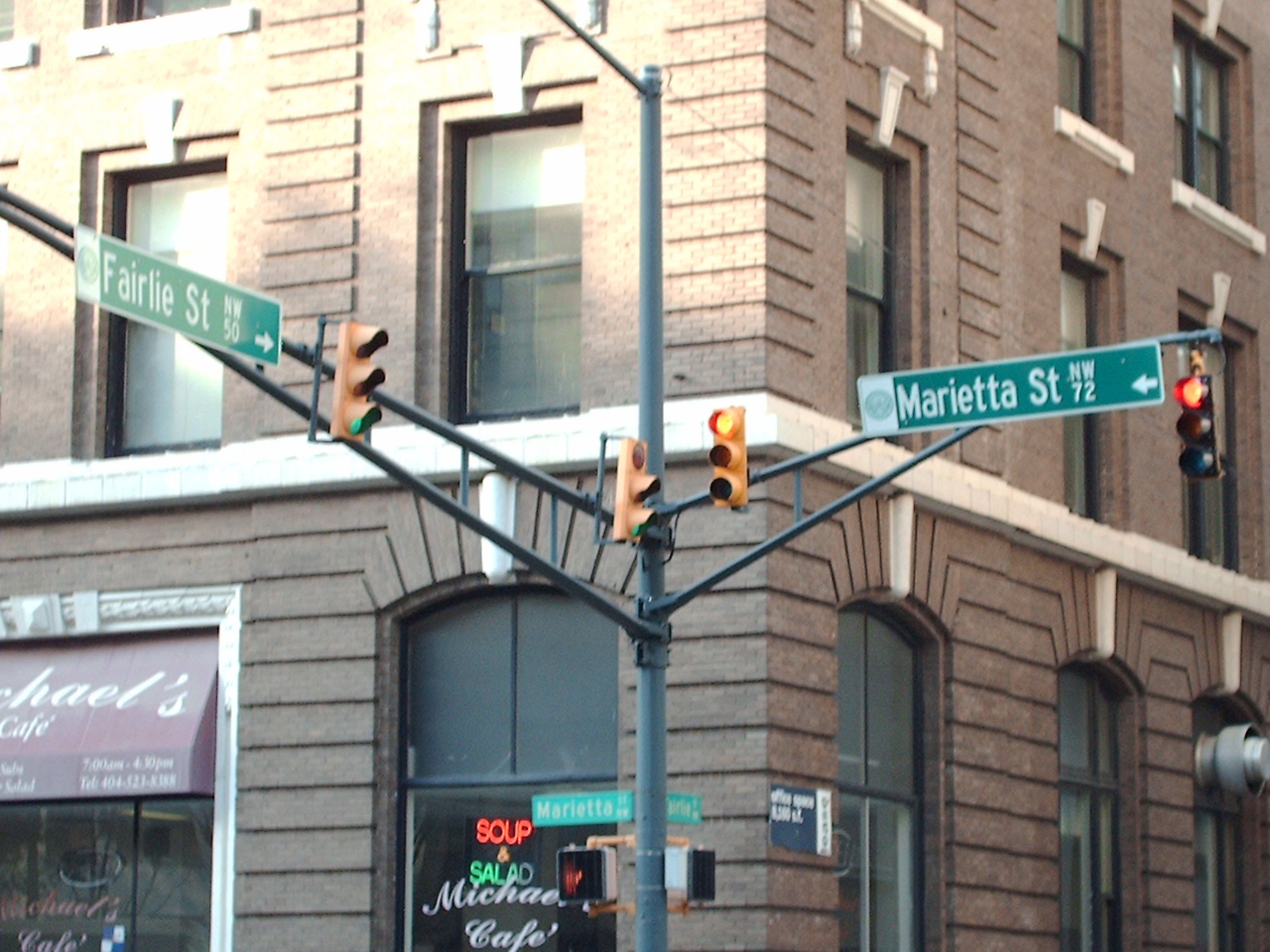
Marietta Street in downtown Atlanta

The Downtown Atlanta Neighborhood is divided into seventeen (17) Districts:

- Auburn Avenue Corridor - Cultural District
- Castleberry Hill - Arts District
- Centennial Hill - Energy District
- Centennial Park - Tourism District
- Centennial Yards (CY) - Entertainment District
- Edgewood Avenue Corridor - Nightlife District
- Fairlie-Poplar - Residential District
- Underground - Music & Shopping District
- Five Points - Transportation District
- Garnett - Civic District
- Georgia State University (GSU) Campus - Education District
- Congress Center - Sports & Events District
- Government Walk - Government District
- Grady Memorial Hospital (GMH) Campus - Medical District
- Peachtree Center (PTC) - Business District
- South Downtown (SoDo) - Tech District
- Whitehall Street Corridor - Industrial District

== Economy ==
Downtown contains over 26 million square feet (2,400,000 m^{2}) of office space; combined with Midtown as the central business district they make up over 48 million sq ft, more than the CBDs of Dallas, and Miami. Downtown's economy is also driven by its government facilities, venues, and retail options.

=== Governmental facilities ===
The Federal government maintains a strong presence in Downtown. The U.S. Census Bureau has its Atlanta Regional Office in the Centennial Tower and the Atlanta Regional Census Center in Suite 1000 in the Marquis Two Tower in the Peachtree Center. The National Transportation Safety Board operates the Atlanta Aviation Field Office in the Atlanta Federal Center in Downtown Atlanta. The Martin Luther King Jr. Federal Building was built and "designed and constructed to accommodate the rapidly expanding volume of the Postal Service, which was then oriented around a single, central processing facility."

The Sam Nunn Atlanta Federal Center is the ninth largest federal building in the United States and the largest in the southeast. It "houses 5,000 employees for dozens of federal agencies and combines four distinct structural elements in central downtown, equaling 2 million square feet (190,000 m^{2})." The Richard B. Russell Federal Building, a 1.25-million-square-foot (116,000 m^{2}) mixed-used office building, contains the U.S. District Court for the Northern District of Georgia and offices for several other federal agencies, including the Department of Energy's regional office.

Further north in the Fairlie-Poplar district of Downtown is the U.S. Court of Appeals. This court takes federal cases from the states of Alabama, Georgia, and Florida. It is officially named the Elbert P. Tuttle U.S. Court of Appeals building, named after a former Chief Judge of the U.S. Court of Appeals for the Fifth Circuit (the predecessor court to the U.S. Court of Appeals for the Eleventh Circuit).

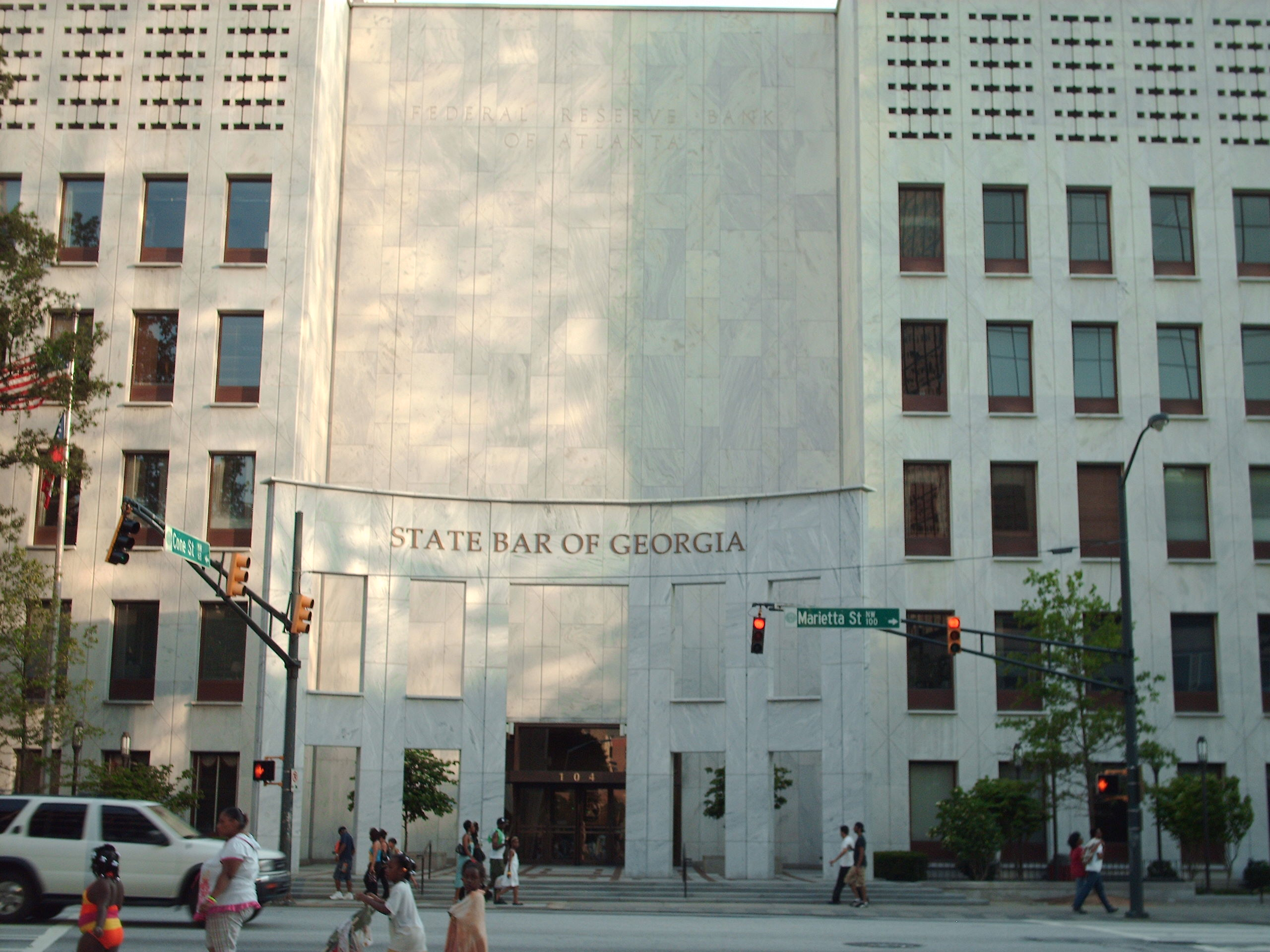
The State Bar of Georgia, the former Federal Reserve Bank of Atlanta.

Downtown is also marked by its state, county, and city government facilities. The Georgia State Capitol, the seat of the government for the State of Georgia, is located South Downtown. Its gold dome is visible from the Downtown Connector. The Fulton County Government Center, the seat of the Fulton County Government, is located on Pryor Street. The Fulton County Courthouse is located directly across the street from the Fulton County Government Center. A few blocks away from the U.S. Court of Appeals is the State Bar of Georgia building, the former location of the Federal Reserve Bank of Atlanta before it moved to its Midtown location in 2001.

=== Venues and convention centers ===
Downtown is home to most of the city's major sporting venues. Mercedes-Benz Stadium is home to the Atlanta Falcons, the city's NFL team, and Atlanta United FC, the city's MLS team. Mercedes-Benz Stadium also hosts major college football events, including the annual Aflac Kickoff Game, the SEC Championship Game, the Celebration Bowl, and the Peach Bowl. In its vicinity is State Farm Arena, the home of the Atlanta Hawks, the city's NBA team. It is located directly across Centennial Olympic Park Drive from the CNN Center. Just south of Interstate 20 are the Georgia State University baseball, basketball, and football stadiums—the latter built from the legacy of the defunct Centennial Olympic Stadium and Turner Field.

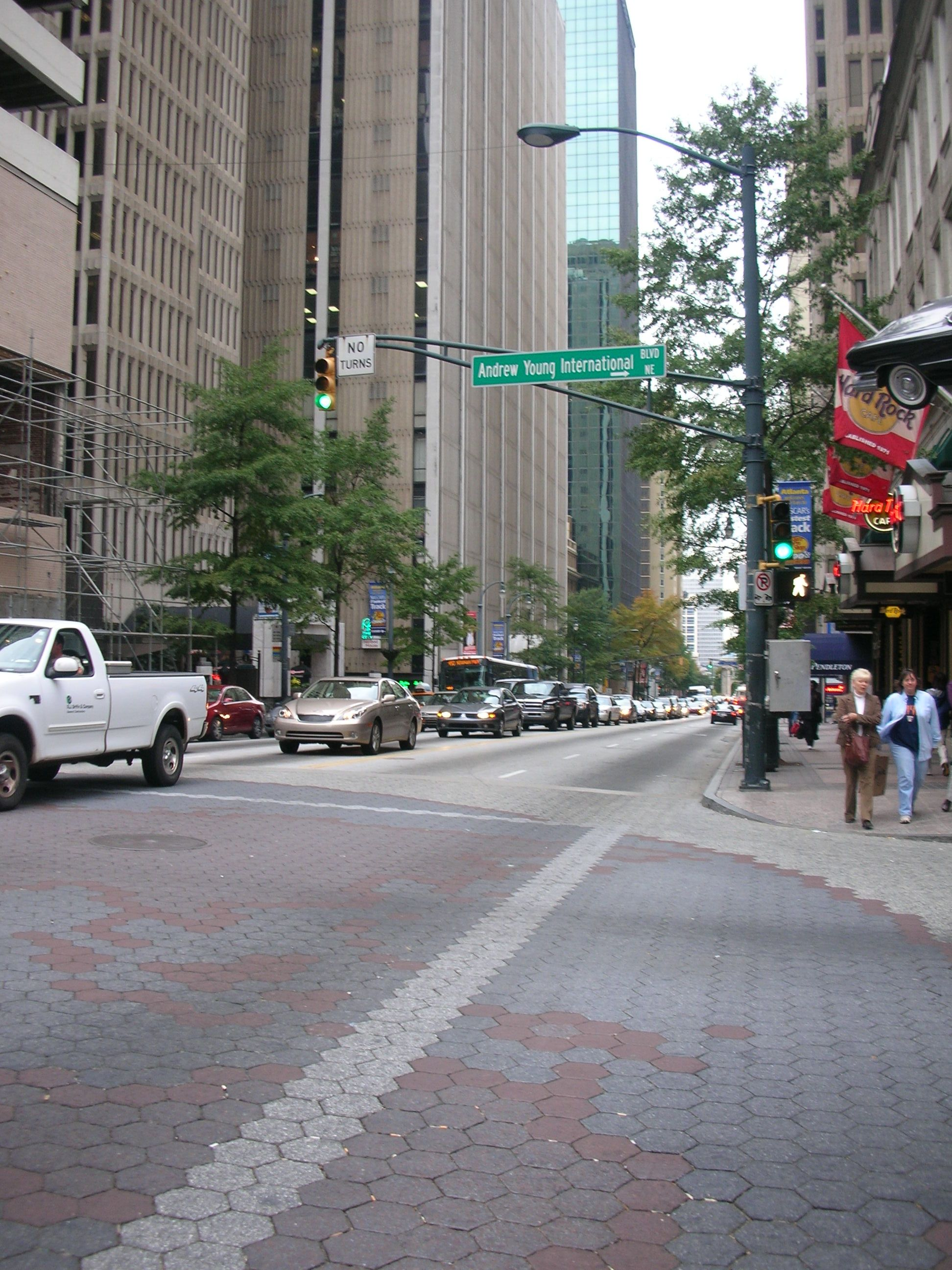
Street scene in Peachtree Center

The Tabernacle, located on Luckie Street, is a music concert hall built in 1910 for the Tabernacle Baptist Church. In 1996 it was converted into a House of Blues Club for the Olympics. It was renamed "The Tabernacle" in 1998. The concert hall is four stories and can seat 2600.

AmericasMart is a wholesale trade center consisting of four buildings totaling seven million square feet. The Mart hosts several trade shows every year including Market Wednesday, Atlanta Apparel, Atlanta Spring Immediate Delivery, and The Atlanta International Gift and Home Furnishings Market. Some permanent showrooms are open daily, though many are open only part of the time or during trade shows.

Clustered around the Mercedes-Benz Stadium and the CNN Center, the Georgia World Congress Center is a state-owned convention center. Opened in 1976, it was the first state owned and operated major convention center in the United States. As the fourth largest convention center in the United States and with 1.4 million square feet (130,000 m^{2}) of space, more than a million people attend conventions at the Georgia World Congress Center annually, and as many 125,000 people attend a single event.

=== Retail ===
Located near the MARTA Five Points Station, Underground Atlanta is Downtown's shopping and entertainment district. During the 1920s, streets in the area were raised above the ground (and the railroad tracks) for a better flow of traffic. The Mall at Peachtree Center, located on Peachtree Street, has 60 specialty shops, including six full-scale restaurants, as well as a regular food court, a conference center in the South Tower. It also includes the Peachtree Center Athletic Club, which contains a 72,000-square-foot (6,700 m^{2}) full service athletic facility. Transit access is provided MARTA's Peachtree Center station that is directly connected to it. Centennial Yards is a $5 billion mixed-use development that is expected to be completed in 2026. The transformative 50-acre project will bring more restaurants, entertainment, housing, hotel rooms, and retail stores to downtown.

=== Diplomatic missions ===
The Consulate-General of Argentina, The Consulate-General of Germany, Consulate of Belgium, and the Consulate-General of South Korea are located in Peachtree Center. The Consulate-General of the United Kingdom is located in the Georgia-Pacific Tower.

== Parks ==
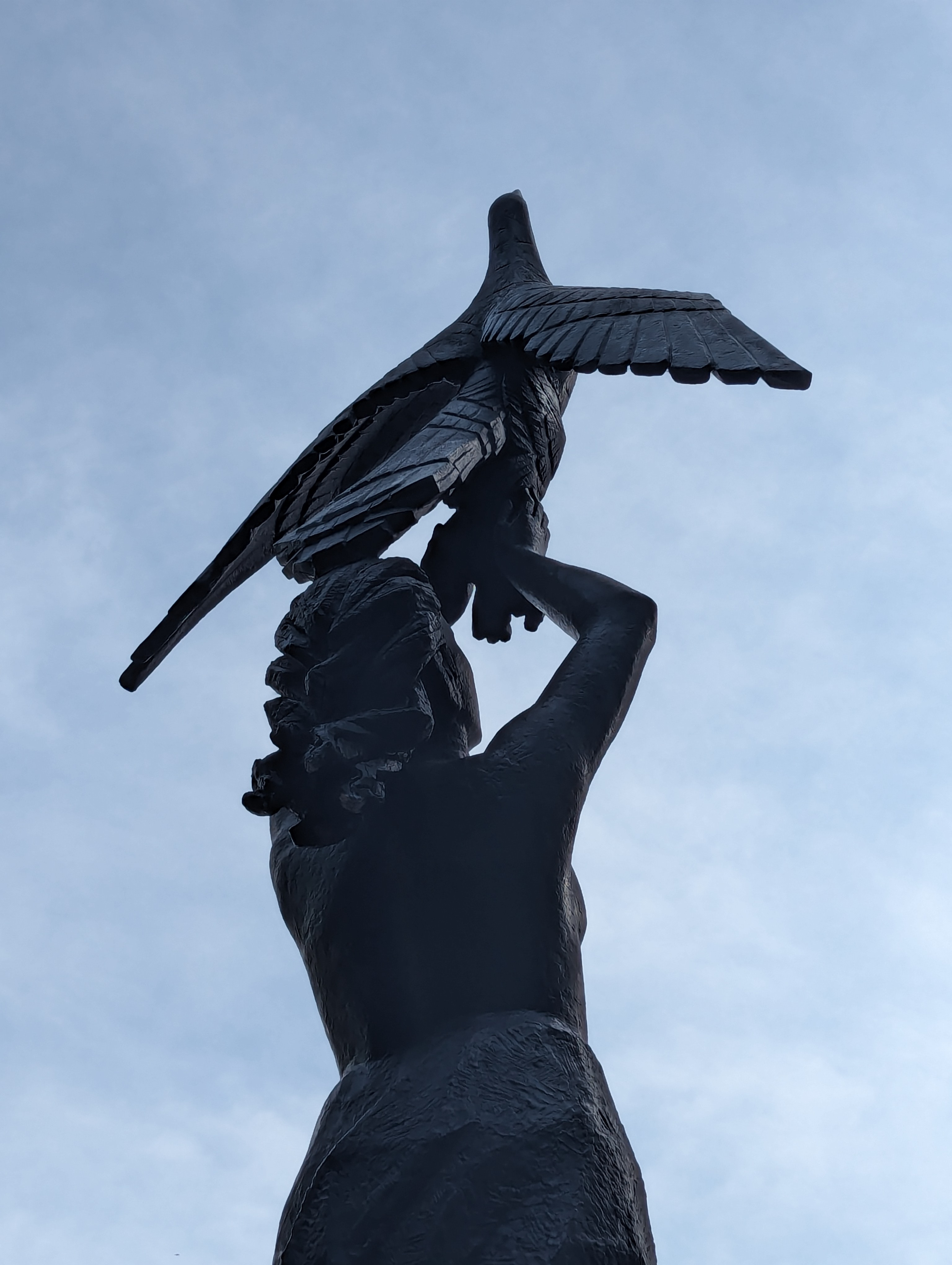
Detail of the Phoenix Memorial, a symbol of the city

Woodruff Park, named after Robert W. Woodruff, is a 6-acre (24,000 m^{2}) park in Downtown located a block away from Five Points. The park is the location of the iconic Phoenix Memorial, which memorializes Atlanta's rise from the ashes of the Civil War. Built as a legacy of the 1996 Olympic Games, Centennial Olympic Park, located on 21-acre (85,000 m^{2}) area of Downtown, is the largest downtown park in the United States developed in the last 25 years.

A famous part of the park is the Fountain of Rings, the world's largest interactive fountain utilizing the Olympic symbol of five interconnecting rings. The park hosts many events, such as music concerts and a fireworks display for the Independence Day holiday. Hurt Park with its lighted fountain was an attraction in the 1940s and 1950s, and is a reminder of a bygone time.

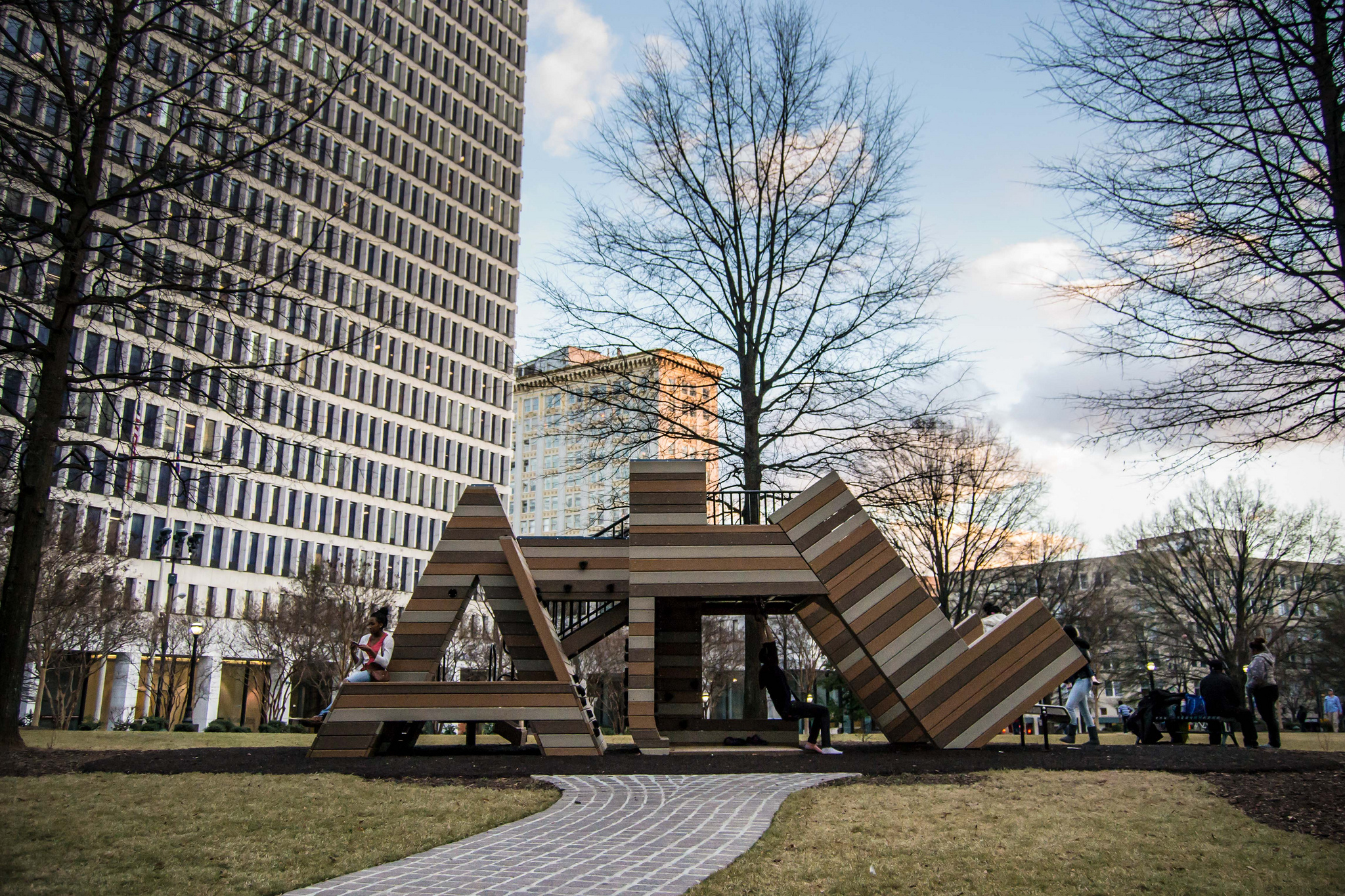
A playground spelling "ATL" in Woodruff Park

== Attractions ==
Just north of Centennial Olympic Park is the Georgia Aquarium, the world's third largest aquarium, after Marine Life Park in Singapore built in 2012 and the Chimelong Ocean Kingdom in China built in 2010. The Georgia Aquarium remains the largest aquarium in the United States and in the Western Hemisphere, with more than 8 million US gallons (30,000 m^{3}) of fresh and marine water. It is listed as one of the "1,000 Places to See Before You Die".

The World of Coca-Cola, situated near the Georgia Aquarium at Pemberton Place, is a permanent exhibition to the history of Coca-Cola. Downtown is in the process of bringing new attractions to the area, particularly in the area clustered around Centennial Olympic Park. In June 2008, Atlanta was selected for the future home of the National Health Museum. It will be near Centennial Olympic Park where it is estimated to attract between 1.1 and 1.4 million visitors per year.

== Education ==
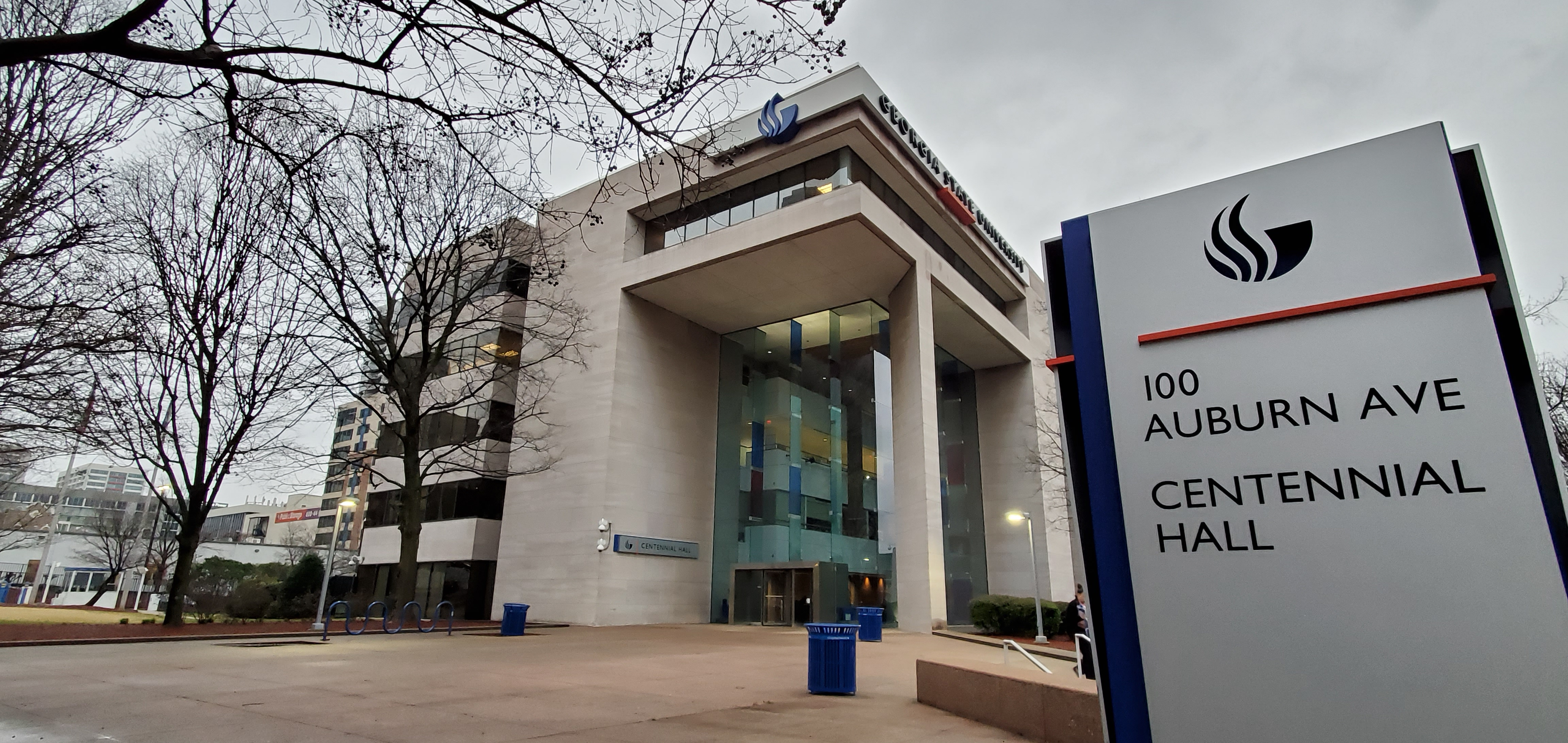
Georgia State University

Georgia State University, a four-year public research institution, has been a major force in Downtown's resurgence. Downtown has benefited from the flurry of GSU-related construction and land acquisitions as the institution undergoes its transformation from a commuter school to a traditional university. In the early 2000s, under then-president Carl Patton, the university undertook the creation of a master plan that would make GSU "a part of the city, not apart from the city." The resulting $1 billion master plan has led to 14 new or renovated university buildings, including academic structures, student dormitories, dining halls, and sporting facilities. The result is a reinvigorated Downtown, especially in the areas around Woodruff Park and Sweet Auburn.

Downtown Atlanta is in Atlanta Public Schools (APS). Zoned schools are: Centennial Place Academy (K-8 school), and Midtown High School (formerly Henry W. Grady High School).

== Transportation ==
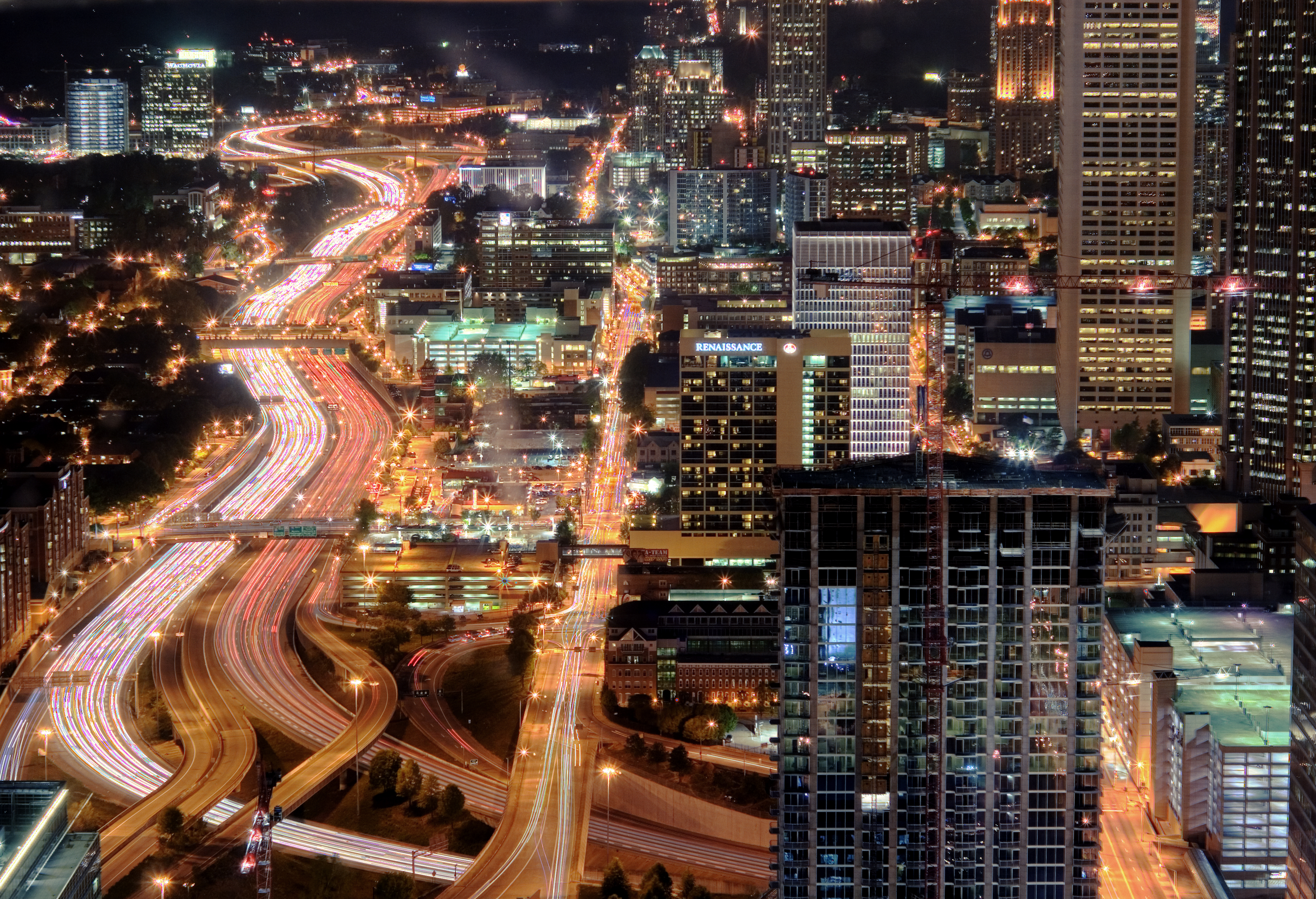
Downtown Connector

Downtown is a transportation hub for the entire region. The Downtown Connector runs north and south through the district. The Connector is the primary freeway artery for the city. Downtown is also served by Interstate 20, which creates the southern border of Downtown. Downtown also has many surface streets that serve as alternatives to the Downtown Connector.

MARTA's east–west and north–south subway lines converge in the middle of Downtown at the Five Points station. The North-South Line has four additional stops at Garnett (in South Downtown), Peachtree Center, and Civic Center (in SoNo). The east–west line has two additional stops at SEC District and Georgia State.

== See also ==
- Peachtree Street
- South Downtown, Atlanta
- Midtown Atlanta (Central financial and residential district of Atlanta)
- Buckhead (Northern financial and residential district of Atlanta)
- List of tallest buildings in Atlanta
- List of skyscrapers
- Peachtree-Pine shelter
- Gentrification of Atlanta
- 2008 Atlanta tornado outbreak
