= Castleberry Hill =

- Castleberry Hill Historic District
- U.S. National Register of Historic Places
- U.S. Historic district
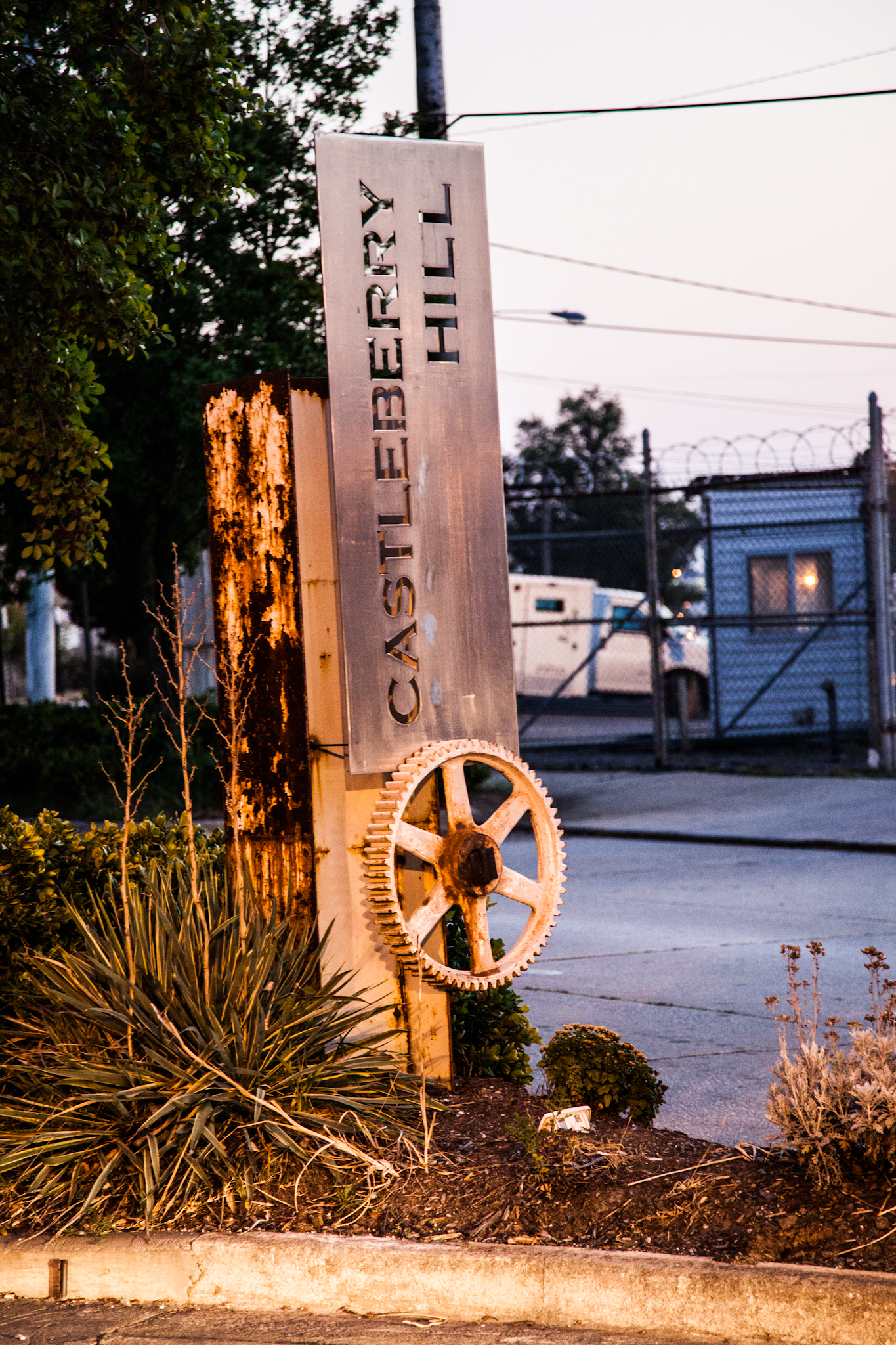
- Welcome Sign

- Location within Atlanta Location within Georgia Location within the United States
- Location: Atlanta, Georgia
- Coordinates: 33°45′3.6″N 84°23′59.7″W
- NRHP reference No.: 85001742
- Added to NRHP: August 8, 1985

Castleberry Hill is a historic arts district and southwest district of Downtown Atlanta. It is a federally recognized historic district since 1985 and became a City of Atlanta Landmark District in 2006.

== History ==
The area in the city limits of Atlanta known today as Castleberry Hill was originally part of the renegade Snake Nation community that functioned during the 1850s. According to an article from Atlanta Magazine, Castleberry Hill was, by the mid-nineteenth century, a red-light district filled with prostitutes, gambling, and cockfighting. By the time the Civil War began, however, this area was in the process of industrialization. Items such as terra cotta and other building materials were produced then in Atlanta factories. Additionally, Castleberry Hill then contained cotton warehousing and grocers. One of those grocers was Daniel Castleberry, for whom the area was named. Daniel Castleberry, however, is believed to have been an established businessman in the area as a result of his winning the land in the 1821 Georgia Land Lottery. By the early 1990s, the area went into heavy decline, serving as the backdrop for dystopic films such as Freejack and Kalifornia. The 1996 Olympics saw another influx of development for the area. Loft conversions began in the 1980s, and currently make up the majority of housing options in the neighborhood. In the early 21st century, Castleberry Hill began another renaissance with major motion pictures and TV series such as Walking Dead' being filmed in the area; the now well-known Castleberry Hill Art Stroll, which is held on the second Friday of each month, has become yet another popular event in this area. Castleberry Hill was noted for having one of the largest concentrations of black owned businesses in the nation. Since 2017, numerous new developments in downtown helped significantly increase property values, demand, visitors, safety, and diversity in the neighborhood.

== Gallery ==
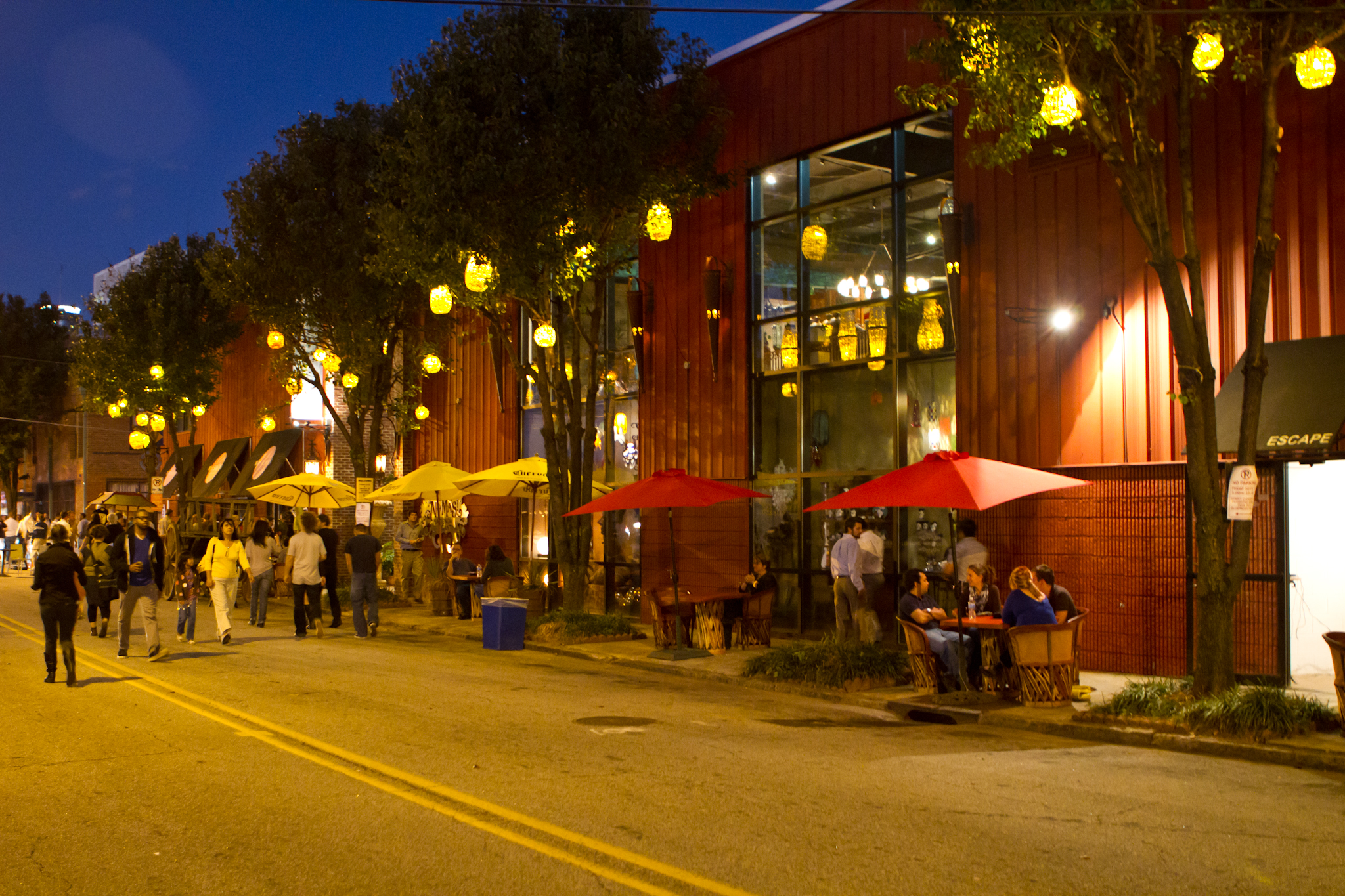
The Art Stroll

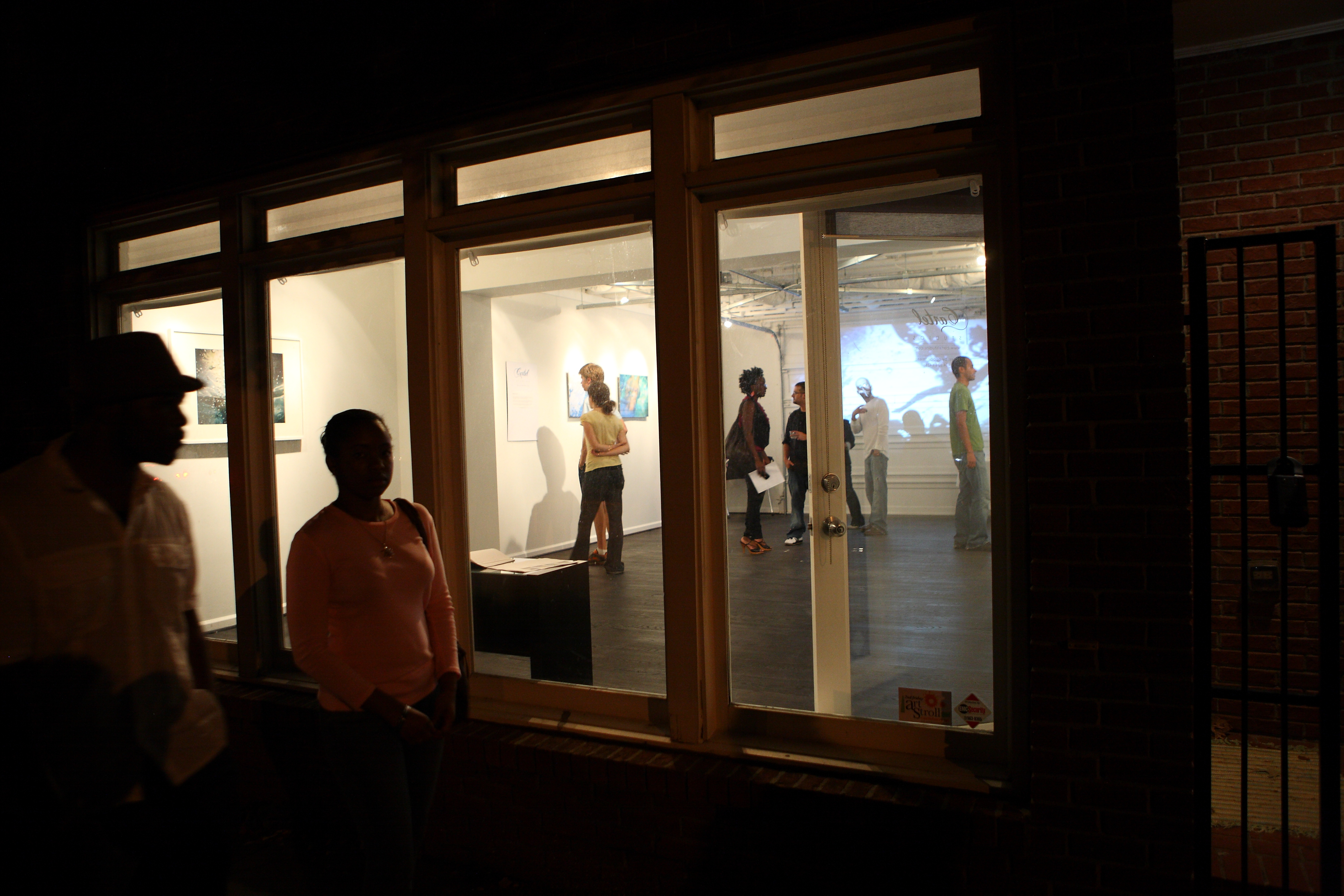
The Art Stroll

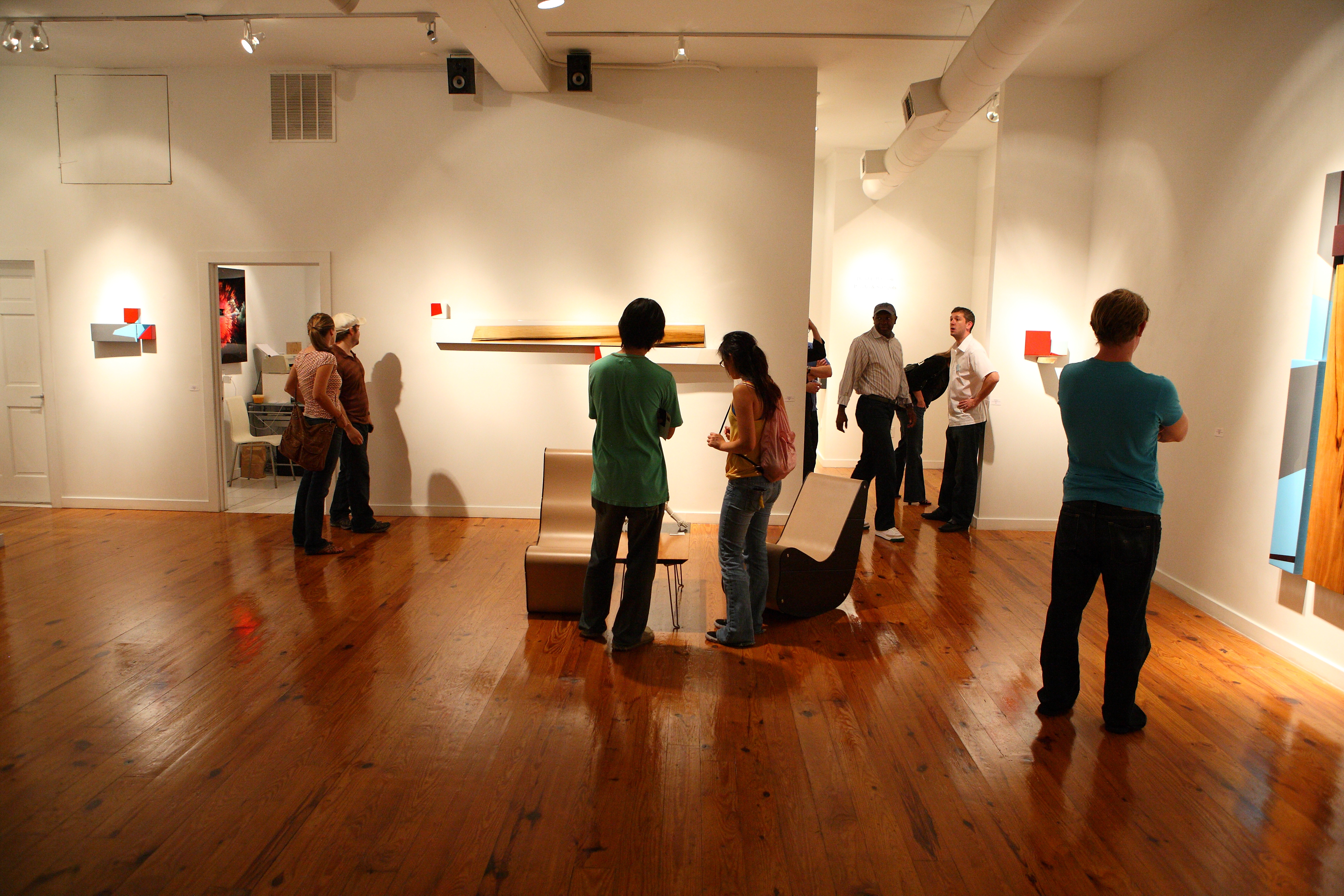
The Art Stroll

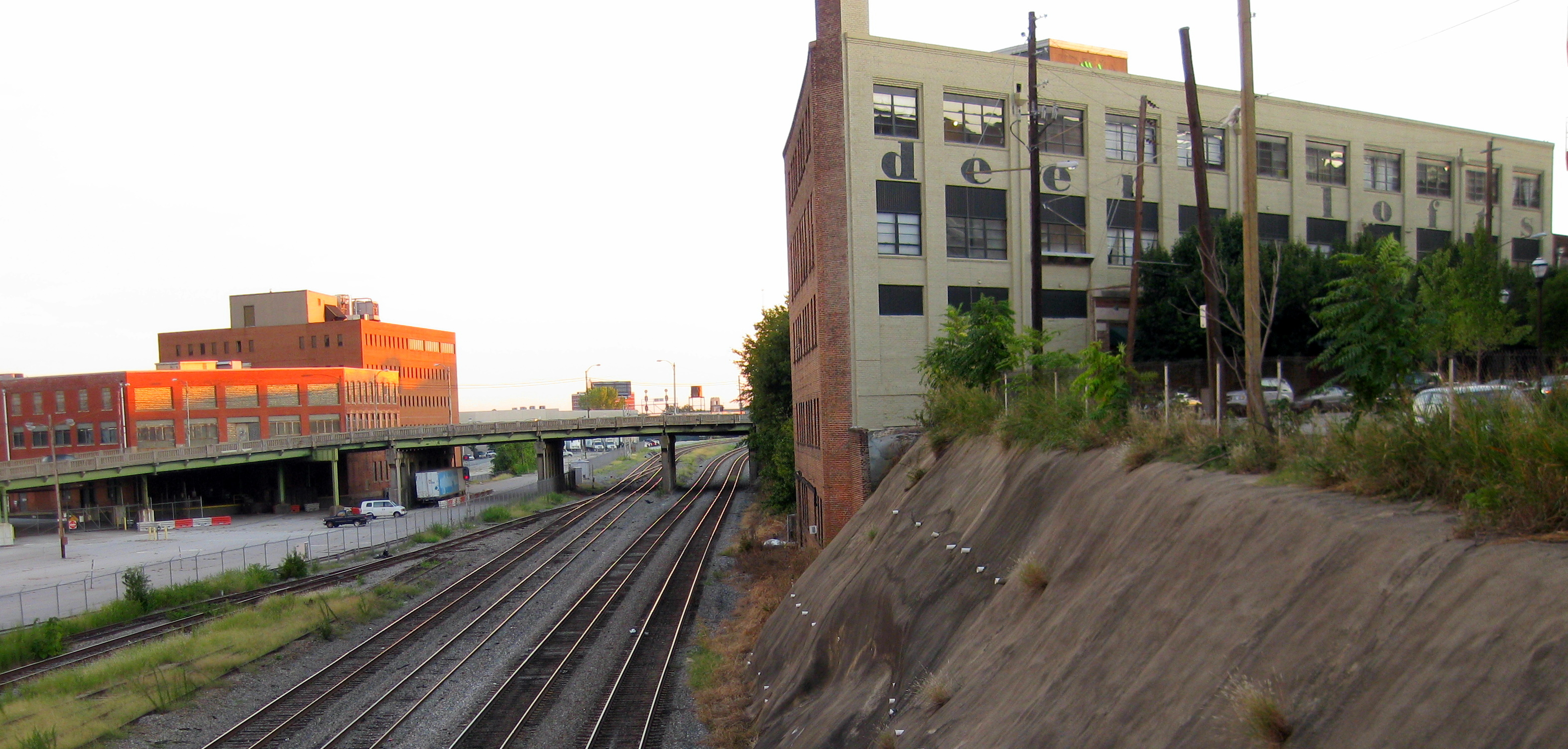
Lofts

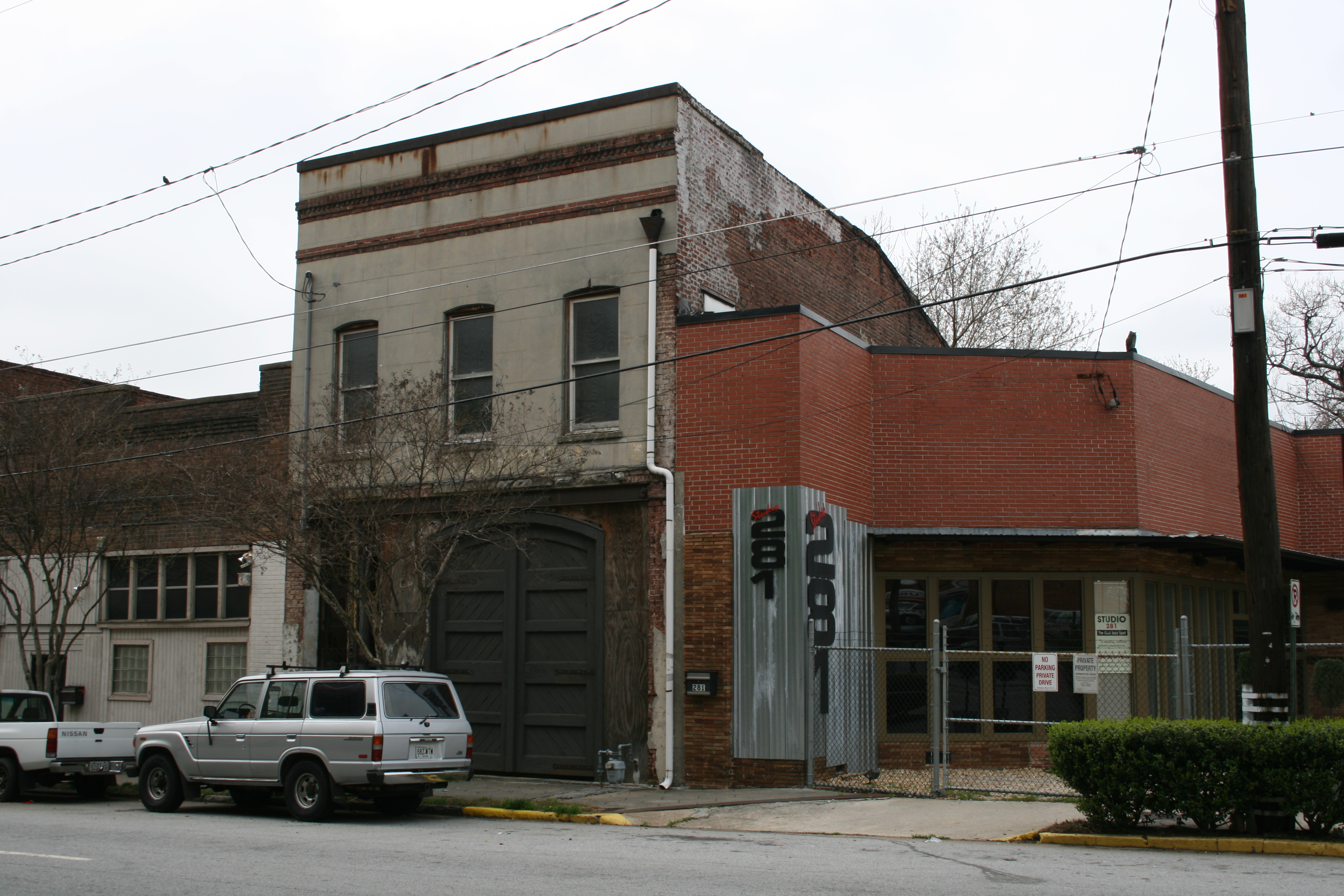
Lofts
