= Hotel District =

Neighborhood in Atlanta, United States

Coordinates: 33.75969°N 84.387589°W

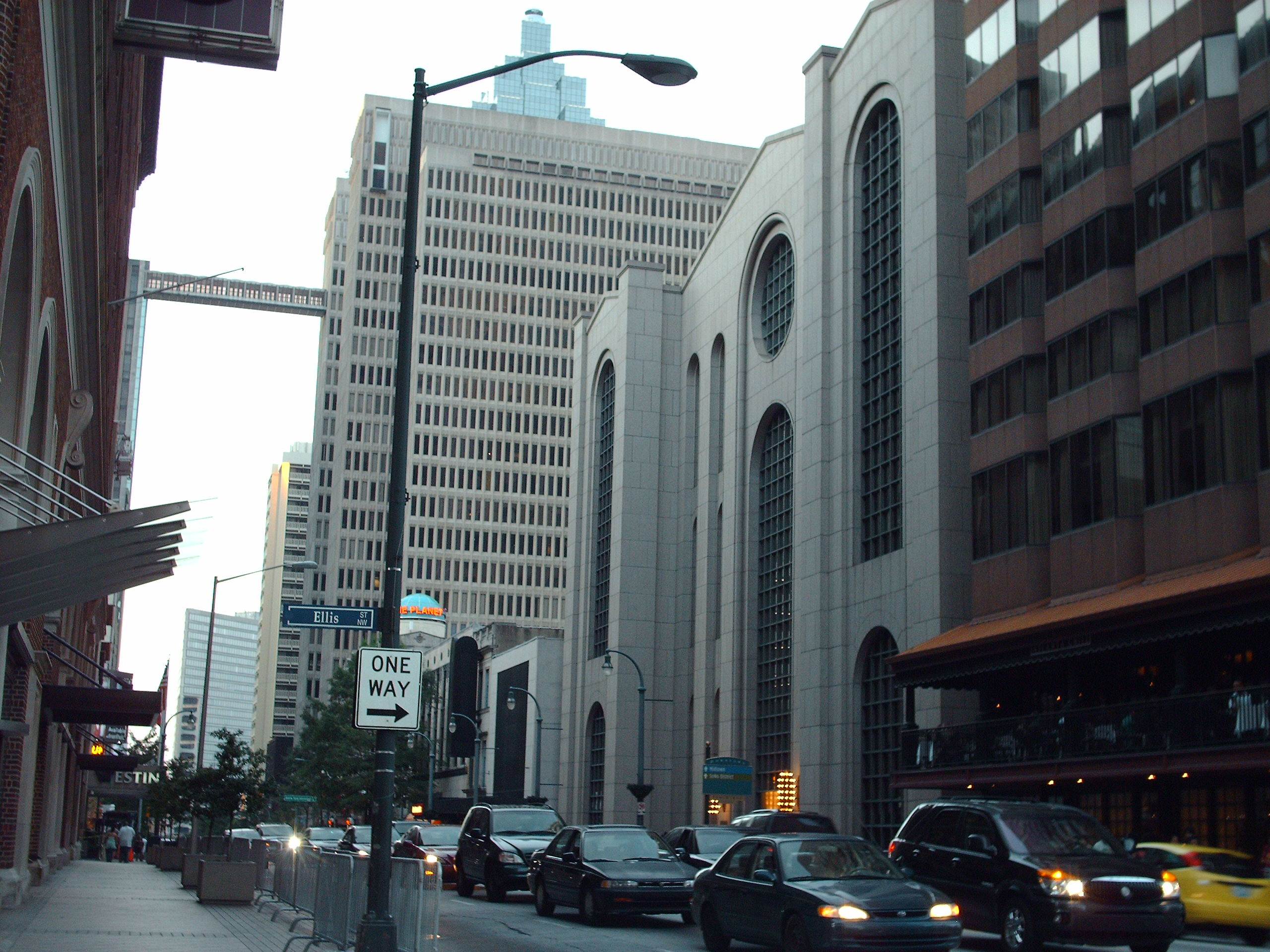
A portion of the Hotel District

The Hotel District is a neighborhood in Downtown Atlanta, Georgia, United States. The district's name is derived from it being the home to many hotels, one of them being the famous Westin Peachtree Plaza Hotel. The Hotel District is generally considered to be bounded by the Downtown Connector to the east, Five Points to the south, Centennial Olympic Park to the west, and Midtown to the north. The district's primary thoroughfare is Peachtree Street, which contains most of the restaurants, hotels, and office buildings. The intersection of Andrew Young International Boulevard and Peachtree Street forms the heart of the district.

== Hotels ==
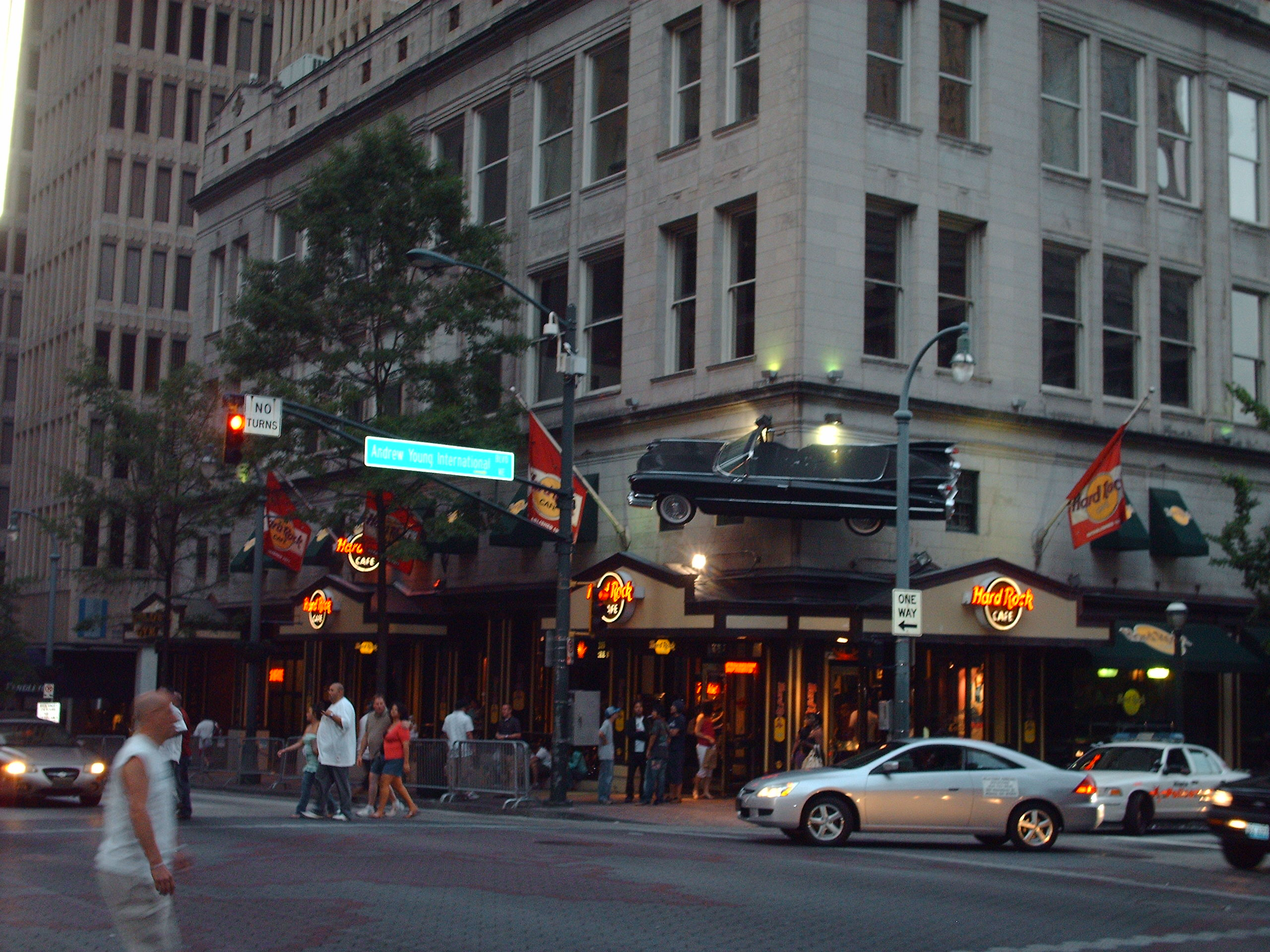
The Hard Rock Cafe Atlanta is located in the Hotel District

As its name suggests, the Hotel District is the home of many of Atlanta's signature hotels. Tourists coming to Atlanta for conventions typically stay in the hotels located in this district. Some of those hotels include:

- Westin Peachtree Plaza Hotel
- Atlanta Marriott Marquis
- Hyatt Regency Atlanta
- Ritz Carlton
- W Hotel
- Atlanta Sheraton
- The Glenn
- Omni Hotel
- Hilton Atlanta
- The Ellis
- Embassy Suites Atlanta
- Renaissance Hotel

All of these hotels are located in walking distance to many of Atlanta's tourist attractions, such as the Georgia Aquarium, World of Coca-Cola, Centennial Olympic Park, and the CNN Center, as well as other facilities such as State Farm Arena, Georgia World Congress Center, and Mercedes-Benz Stadium.
