= Technology Square (Atlanta) =

Neighborhood in Atlanta, Georgia

- Neighborhood
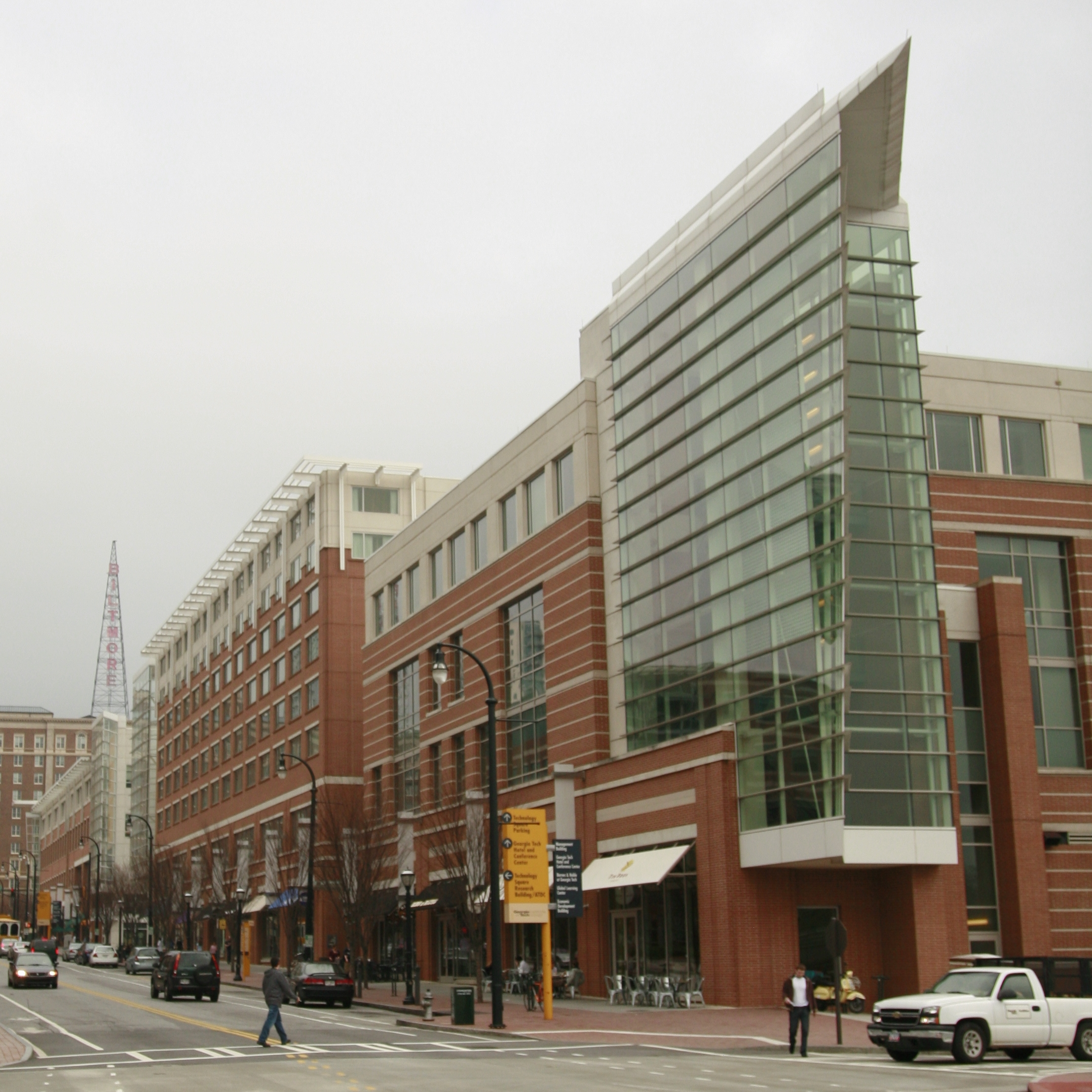
- A view of Technology Square

- Location within Atlanta
- Coordinates: 33.777°N 84.389°W
- Country: United States
- State: Georgia
- County: Fulton County
- City: City of Atlanta
- Council District: 2
- NPU: E
- Districts: Georgia Tech; Coda (Atlanta); Centergy One; ATDC

Area
  - Total: 0.5 sq mi (1.3 km^{2})
- Estimate

Population (2020 est.)
  - Total: 5,000
  - Density: 10,000/sq mi (3,900/km^{2})
- ZIP Codes: 30308
- Area codes: 404, 470, 678, 770

Technology Square, commonly called Tech Square, is a multi-block neighborhood located in Midtown Atlanta, Georgia, United States. Tech Square is bounded by 8th Street on the north, 3rd Street on the south, West Peachtree Street to the east, and Williams Street to the west. Tech Square includes several academic buildings affiliated with Georgia Tech and provides access to the campus via the Fifth Street Pedestrian Plaza Bridge, reconstructed in 2007. It also contains restaurants, retail shops, condominiums, office buildings, and a hotel.

== History ==
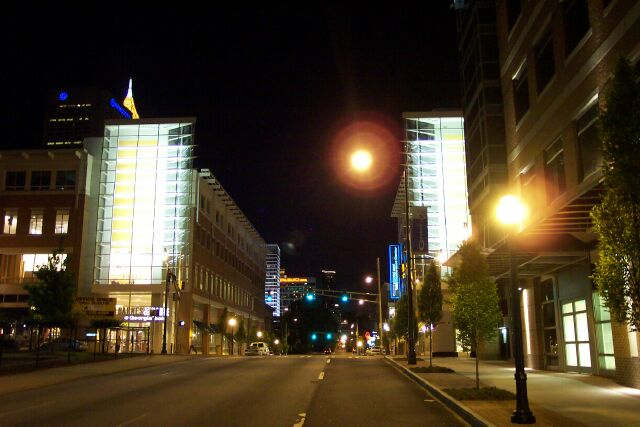
Tech Square at night

Announced in 2000 and opened in 2003, the district designed by tvsdesign was built over previously vacant surface parking lots and has contributed to an ongoing revitalization of the Midtown neighborhood. In October 2013, Georgia Tech and local businesses celebrated Tech Square's 10th anniversary.

In 2007, the Georgia Tech Foundation purchased the Crum & Forster Building, located in Tech Square, and sought permits to demolish the building as part of a plan to expand Technology Square. The building was designed in the 1920s by the architectural firm of Ivey and Crook, whose founders Ernest Ivey and Lewis Crook helped establish the Architecture program at Georgia Tech in 1908. Preservationists fought the demolition and in August 2009, the Atlanta City Council and Mayor Shirley Franklin granted the building protective status as a historic landmark. The Georgia Tech Foundation appealed this decision. It instead purchased an adjoining property where a SunTrust Banks branch was previously located. In September 2013, the Georgia Tech Foundation demolished two-thirds of the Crum & Forster Building, leaving only part of its facade, to clear space for the CODA Building.

Further expansion occurred in 2008, when Georgia Tech acquired the Academy of Medicine, and in 2016 when Tech bought the Atlanta Biltmore. Both of these buildings are designated as landmark buildings by the city of Atlanta.

In 2015, construction began on the CODA Building, what was initially referred to as the High Performance Computing Center. The 21-story building is one of the largest buildings in Tech Square, with Georgia Tech serving as the anchor tenant of the building and leasing out additional offices to other companies. Construction was completed on the CODA Building in 2019, with the building being used as office space for GTRI. The food court of CODA hosts such restaurants as Aviva by Kameel, Bro-Ritos (replacing El Burro Pollo), Poke Burri, and Humble Mumble.

== Georgia Tech facilities ==
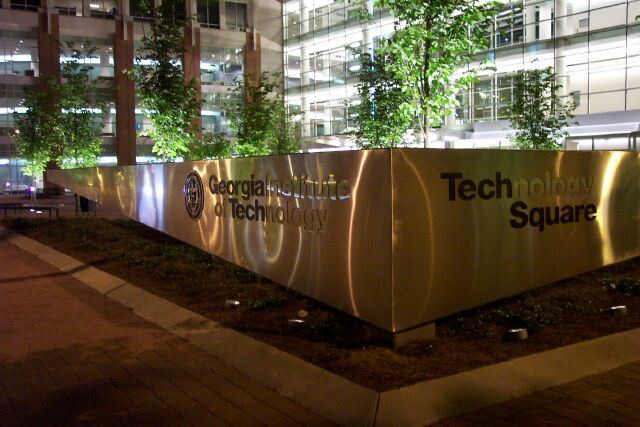
The Scheller College of Business

It is home to the Scheller College of Business, Barnes & Noble @ Georgia Tech, (the official school bookstore), the Georgia Tech Hotel and Conference Center, as well as offices for a number of faculty and graduate students.

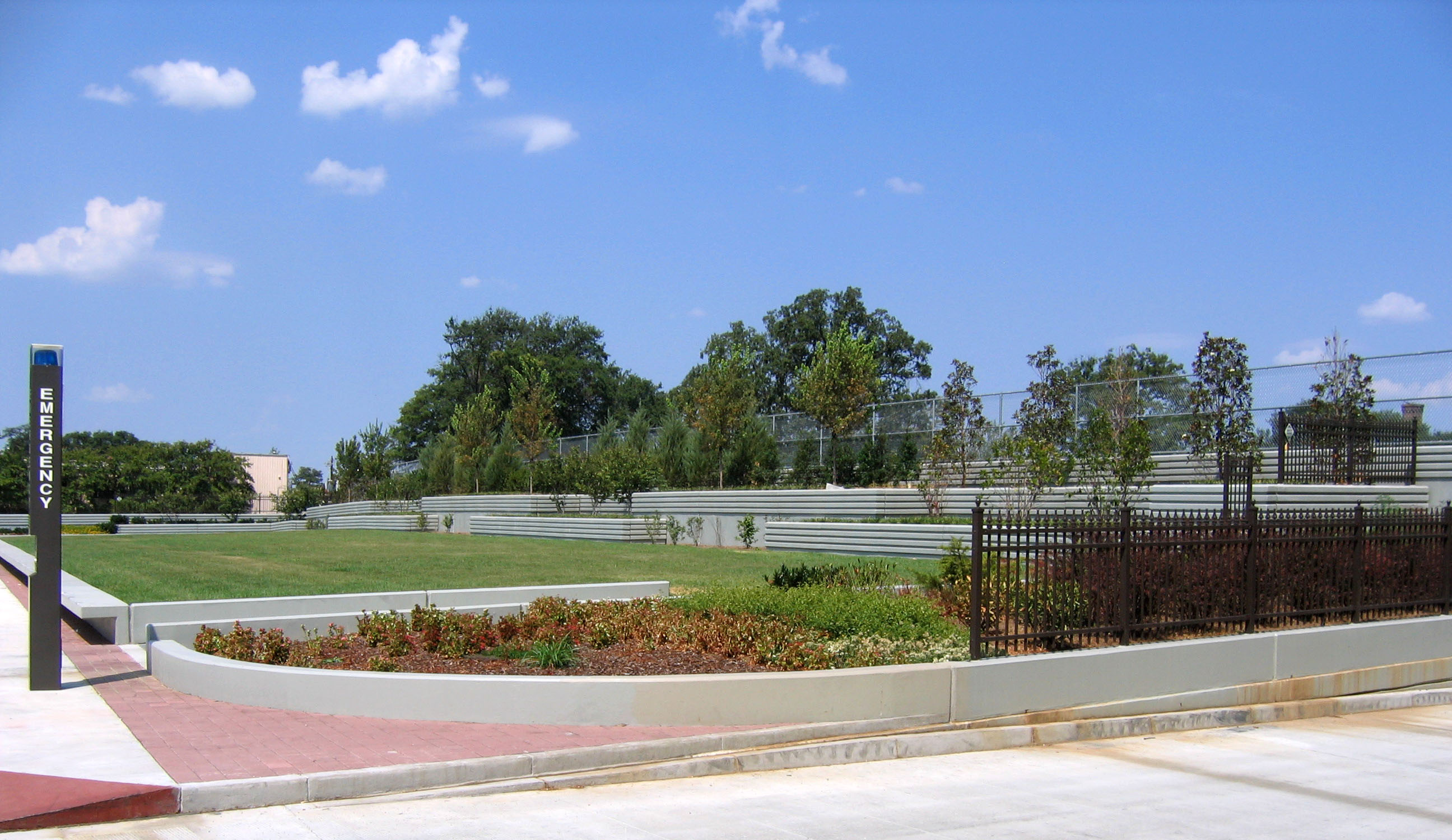
The north side of the 5th Street Bridge, connecting the rest of Georgia Tech's campus to the Square.

On November 24, 2006, the Scheller College of Business dedicated the state of the art, 2,000-square-foot (190 m^{2}) Ferris-Goldsmith Trading Floor. The trading floor opened in 2007 and includes fifty-four dual-display computers as well as electronic stock information on the walls, training all levels of management students to use financial analysis and electronic trading tools. Management faculty use the facility to research improved human performance in trading environments as well as the creation of new financial service models. The trading floor houses Tech's new Quantitative and Computational Finance program.

=== Research laboratories ===
The GVU Center, the Georgia Tech Enterprise Innovation Institute, the Advanced Technology Development Center (ATDC), VentureLab, Flashpoint, and the Georgia Electronics Design Center research group (GEDC), as well as the DiMoS lab (conducts research in the areas of parallel and distributed algorithms for Geographic Information System (GIS), and distributed and mobile computing) are all housed around Tech Square. The buildings in Technology Square also host a variety of small businesses as well as business ventures spawned by Georgia Tech research.

Companies at Technology Square with Innovation Centers include, Chick-fil-A, Delta Air Lines, Coca-Cola, UPS, AT&T Mobility, Boeing, NCR, Panasonic, Georgia Power, Siemens, The Home Depot, Emerson Climate Technologies, Anthem Inc., Stanley Black & Decker, Thyssenkrupp Materials Services, Worldpay Inc., UCB, and KeySight Technologies.

== Commercial shops ==
Tech Square also contains several restaurants, including Moe's Southwest Grill, Tin Drum Asian Kitchen, Gyro Brothers, Subway, Starbucks, Ray's New York Pizza, and a Waffle House. Within Tech Square are also found non-food retail establishments, such as T-Mobile.

== CODA mixed-use development ==
CODA, a 770,000 square feet (72,000 m^{2}) mixed-use development, was completed in May 2019.

== See also ==
- Georgia Tech main campus
