= List of historic buildings and districts designated by the City of Atlanta =

The City of Atlanta Historic Preservation and Urban Design Commission, which is part of the City of Atlanta government, nominates and designates five types of historic properties: Landmark Building or Site, Historic Building or Site, Landmark District, Historic District, and Conservation District. The Atlanta Urban Design Commission was established by city ordinance in 1975. In 1989, the city enacted its current historic preservation ordinance. Since that time, the city has designated more than seventy individual properties and eighteen districts. There are specific criteria for each type of designation.

These designations are city-level designations, separate from the federally designated properties on the National Register of Historic Places (see National Register of Historic Places listings in Fulton County, Georgia).

== List of individual designated sites ==
The following places are designated as either as a "Landmark Building or Site" or "Historic Building or Site."

The Georgia State Capitol is designated an "Honorary Landmark," the only site to be so designated by the City of Atlanta.

City of Atlanta designated landmark and historic buildings and sites
Building/Site Name	Street Address	Date Designated	Designation Type	Also on NRHP?
Academy of Medicine	875 West Peachtree St., N.W.	1989-10-23	Landmark	Yes
Andrews-Dunn House	2801 Andrews Dr., NW	1992-12-2	Landmark	
Atlanta City Hall	68 Mitchell St., SE	1989-10-23	Landmark	Yes
Atlanta Stockade	750 Glenwood Ave., SE	1989-10-23	Historic	Yes
Basilica of the Sacred Heart of Jesus	325 Peachtree Center Ave., NE	1990-04-10	Landmark	Yes
Biltmore Hotel and Tower	817 West Peachtree St., NW	1989-10-23	Landmark	Yes
C&S National Bank Building, now the J. Mack Robinson College of Business Administration Building	35 Broad St., NW	1992-07-04	Landmark	
Candler Building	127 Peachtree St., NE	1989-10-23	Landmark	Yes
Carnegie Building	141 Carnegie Way, NW	1990-07-10	Historic	Yes
Central Presbyterian Church	201 Washington St., SW	1989-10-23	Landmark	Yes
Commercial Row	990 Peachtree Street, NE	2008-06-10	Historic	
Crum & Forster Building	771 Spring Street, NW	2009-8-25	Landmark	
Dixie Coca-Cola Bottling Company Plant	125 Edgewood Ave., NE	1989-10-23	Landmark	Yes
Feebeck Hall	96 Armstrong St., NE	1989-10-23	Historic	
First Congregational Church	115 Courtland St., NE	1989-10-23	Landmark	Yes
Flatiron Building	84 Peachtree St., NW	1991-12-23	Landmark	
Fountain Hall	643 Martin Luther King, Jr. Dr., SW	1989-10-14	Landmark	Yes
Fox Theater	660 Peachtree St., NW	1989-10-23	Landmark	Yes
Gentry-McClinton House	132 East Lake Dr., SE	1989-10-14	Landmark	
Georgia Hall (Original Grady Hospital)	36 Butler St., NE	1989-10-23	Landmark	
Georgia State Capitol	206 Washington St., S.E.	NA	Honorary; Landmark	Yes
Georgian Terrace Hotel	659 Peachtree St., NE	1990-06-13	Landmark	
Jeremiah S. Gilbert House	2238 Perkerson Rd., SW	1989-10-14	Landmark	Yes
Graves Hall at Morehouse College	830 Westview Dr., SW	1991-12-23	Landmark	
Haas-Howell Building (now part of Rialto Center for the Arts)	75 Poplar St., NW	1991-12-23	Landmark	
Healey Building	57 Forsyth St., NW	1991-12-23	Landmark	Yes
Herndon Home	587 University Pl., SW	1989-10-14	Landmark	Yes
Hirsch Hall	55 Coca-Cola Pl., NE	1989-12-12	Historic	
Hurt Building	45 Edgewood Ave., NE	1989-10-23	Landmark	Yes
Imperial Hotel	355 Peachtree St., NE	1989-10-23	Historic	Yes
Kriegshaber House	292 Moreland Ave., NE	1990-06-13	Landmark	Yes
M. Rich Building	82-86 Peachtree St. & 111-115 Martin Luther King, Jr. Dr., SW	2000-06-14	Landmark	
Nicolson, William Perrin, House (Shellmont Inn)	821 Piedmont Ave., NE	1989-10-23	Landmark	Yes
Olympia Building	23 Peachtree St., NE	1990-06-13	Landmark	
Orr, W.W, Doctors Building	478 Peachtree St., NW	1989-10-23	Landmark	
Palmer House Apartments	81 Peachtree Pl. & 952 Peachtree St., NW	1992-04-08	Landmark	Yes
Peachtree Christian Church	1580 Peachtree St., NW	1989-10-23	Landmark	Yes
Edward C. Peters House	179 Ponce de Leon Ave., NE	1989-10-23	Landmark	Yes
Piedmont Park Apartments	266 Eleventh St., NE	1991-12-23	Landmark	Yes
Ponce de Leon Apartments	75 Ponce de Leon Ave., NE	1993-05-10	Landmark	
Randolph-Lucas House	2494 Peachtree Rd., NW	1990-03-12	Historic	
Rhodes Memorial Hall	1516 Peachtree St., NW	1989-10-23	Landmark	Yes
Rhodes-Haverty Building	134 Peachtree St., NW	1989-10-23	Landmark	Yes
Roosevelt High School	745 Rosalia St., SE	1995-10-10	Landmark	
Rose, Rufus M., House	537 Peachtree St., NE	1989-10-23	Landmark	Yes
Spotswood Hall	505 Argonne Dr, NW	2000-02-16	Landmark	Yes
St. Mark United Methodist Church	781 Peachtree St., NE	1989-10-23	Landmark	Yes
Steiner Clinic	62 Butler St., NE	1989-12-12	Historic	
Swan House	3099 Andrews Dr., NW	1989-10-14	Landmark	Yes
Ten Park Place Building (Thornton Building)	10 Park Pl., NE	1989-10-23	Landmark	
The Castle	87 15th St., NW	1989-12-22	Historic	
The Temple	1589 Peachtree St., NE	1989-10-23	Landmark	Yes
Washington, Booker T., High School	45 Whitehouse Dr., SW	1989-10-14	Landmark	Yes
Wimbish House (Atlanta Woman's Club)	1150 Peachtree Street, NE	2002-03-12	Landmark	
Windsor House Apartments (Margaret Mitchell House & Museum)	979 Crescent Ave., NW	1989-10-23	Landmark	Yes
Wren's Nest (Joel Chandler Harris House)	1050 Gordon St., SW	1989-10-14	Landmark	Yes

== List of designated districts ==
The following are designated as a "Landmark District," "Historic District," or "Conservation District."

District	Designated	Type	Notes
Cabbagetown	June 19, 1989	Landmark	
Druid Hills	June 19, 1989 (expanded January 25, 2001)	Landmark	
M. L. King, Jr.	June 19, 1989	Landmark	
Baltimore Block	June 19, 1989	Landmark	
Washington Park	June 19, 1989	Landmark	
Oakland Cemetery	June 19, 1989	Landmark	
Hotel Row	December 23, 1991	Landmark	
Castleberry Hill	March 16, 2006	Landmark	
West End	December 7, 1991 (expanded August 19, 2002)	Historic	
Adair Park	August 9, 1994	Historic	
Whittier Mill	October 28, 1994	Historic	
Grant Park	April 11, 2000 (expanded November 10, 2003)	Historic	
Inman Park	April 10, 2002	Historic	
Oakland City	November 10, 2004	Historic	
Atkins Park	July 5, 2007	Historic	
Sunset Avenue	May 25, 2011	Historic	
Collier Heights	May 7, 2013	Historic	
Brookwood Hills	November 28, 1994	Conservation	
