= Georgia Tech Savannah =

Branch campus of Georgia Tech, USA

Coordinates: 32.1683°N 81.2117°W

- Georgia Institute of Technology
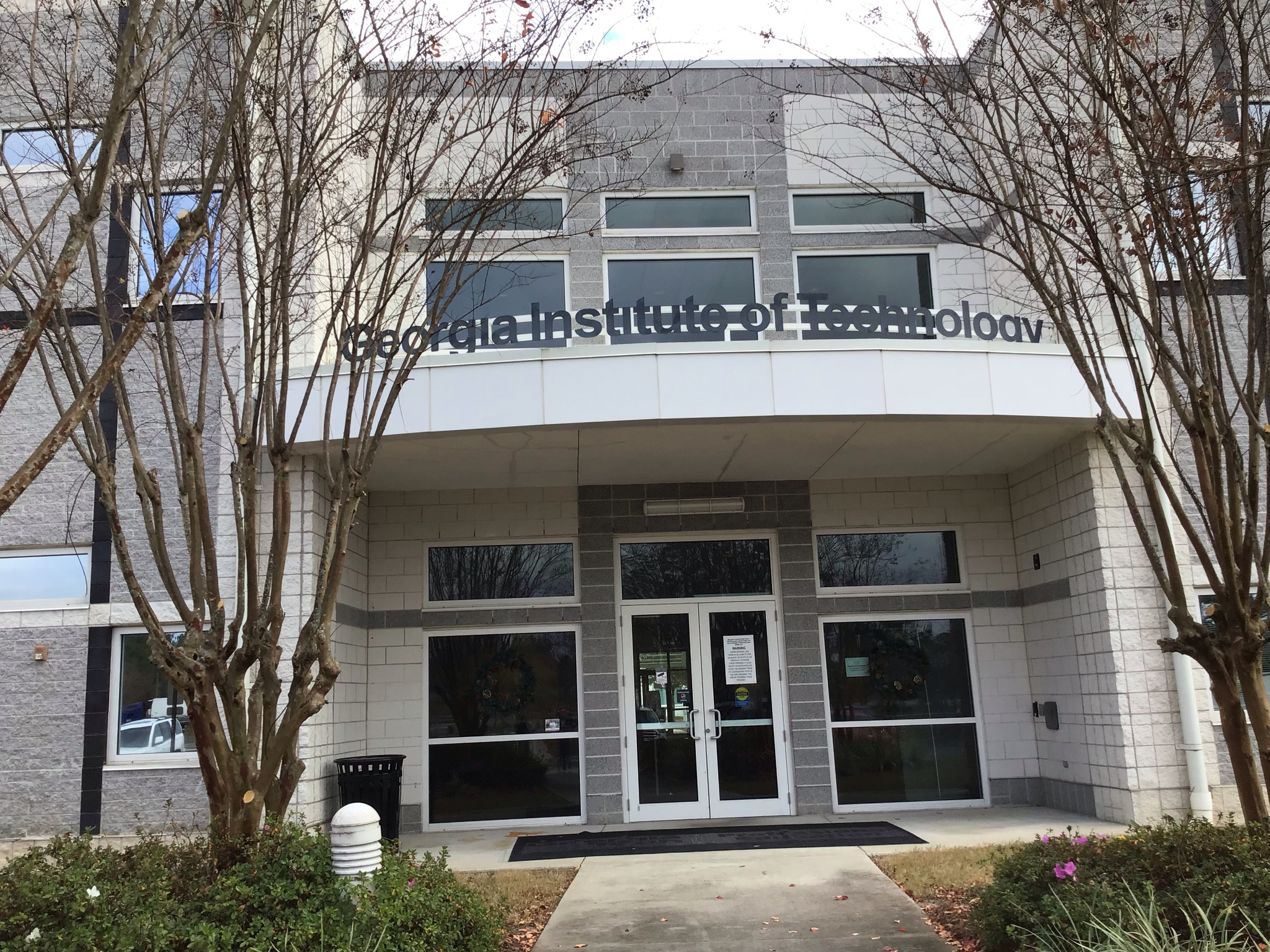
- Entrance to the main building at Georgia Tech Savannah
- Established: 1999
- Location: Savannah, Georgia, United States
- Website: savannah.gatech.edu

Georgia Tech Savannah is a satellite campus of the Atlanta-based Georgia Institute of Technology. It is located in Savannah, Georgia, near Savannah/Hilton Head International Airport. The campus is the institute's hub for professional and continuing education and is home to the regional offices of the Georgia Tech Enterprise Innovation Institute, the Savannah Advanced Technology Development Center, and the Georgia Logistics Innovation Center.

The campus has distributed-learning capable classrooms, laboratories, faculty and staff offices.

== Academics ==
Georgia Tech Savannah is Georgia Tech's center for professional development and continuing education. It offers courses in the areas of project management, OSHA, and other professional education areas. It is also houses the regional offices of the Georgia Tech Economic Development Institute and the Advanced Technology Development Center.

== History ==
In 1999, Georgia Tech began offering local degree programs to engineering students in southeast Georgia, and in 2003 it opened its regional campus in Savannah. The Advanced Technology Development Center also has an office at Georgia Tech Savannah. Up until May 2013, the Savannah campus offered undergraduate (B.S.) and graduate degrees (M.S., Ph.D.) in four engineering majors: Civil, Computer, Electrical and Mechanical, as well as an undesignated Master of Science degree. It offered engineering programs in conjunction with Georgia Southern University, Armstrong Atlantic State University, and Savannah State University, with students taking first- and second-year classes at these institutions.

In 2011, major changes were proposed to the campus to keep it financially viable. Specifically, a Georgia Tech task force found that enrollment at Georgia Tech-Savannah had not met expectations that existed at the inception of the campus, and that undue duplication vis-a-vis the Atlanta campus existed. The task force recommended "a continued and strong commitment to Southeast Georgia by creating a new academic and operational model for GTS, but discontinuing the current degree programs". The proposed alternative path for the campus included providing education to locally based military personnel, establishing executive education and other non-degree programs, offering professional degree programs that would not duplicate existing offerings at the main Atlanta campus, and developing research opportunities that are unique to the coastal region.

The Fall 2012 semester marked the beginning of the final academic year in which traditional courses and degree programs were offered at the Georgia Tech Savannah campus, as it began its transition toward its focus on professional development and continuing education courses. Following the announcement of the "Path Forward" initiative, the vast majority of undergraduate students at the Savannah campus transferred to the institute's main campus in Atlanta, leaving 60 remaining students, mostly undergraduates who were due to complete their degrees by May 2013 and graduate students whose situations were handled "on a case by case basis."
