= Crum & Forster Building =

Coordinates: 33°46′32.5″N 84°23′19″W

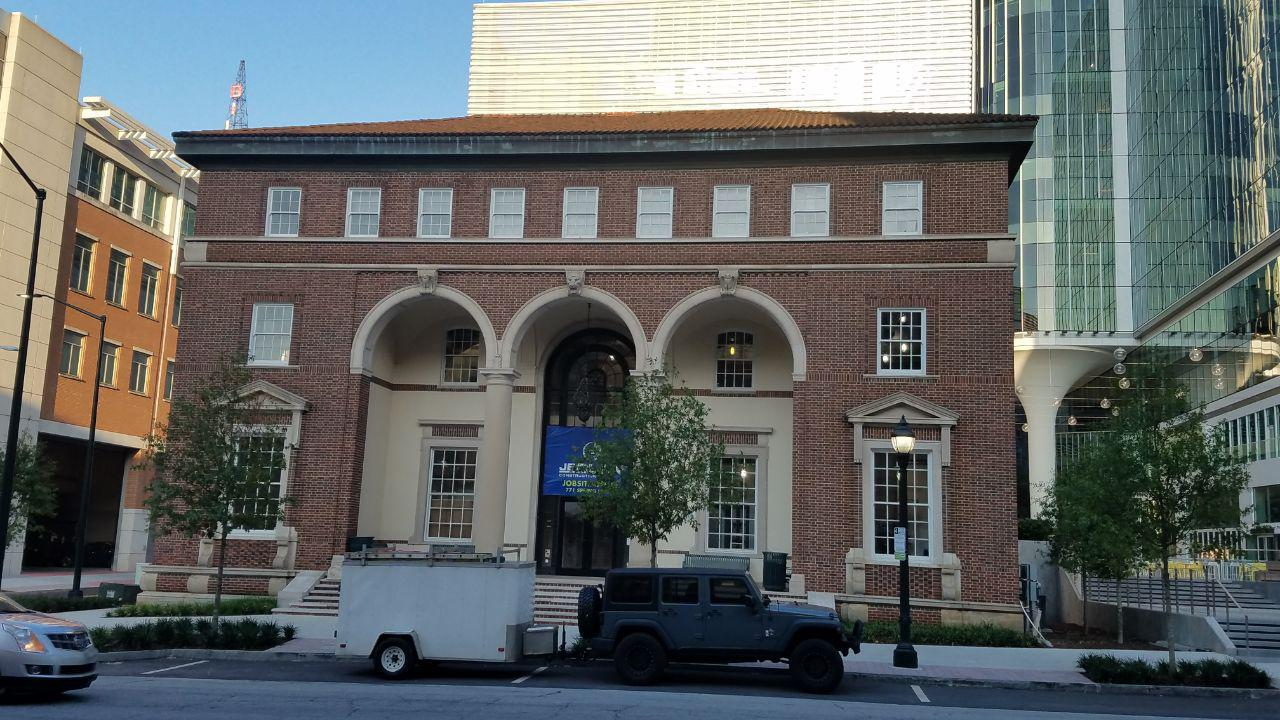
- Crum & Forster Building (2019)

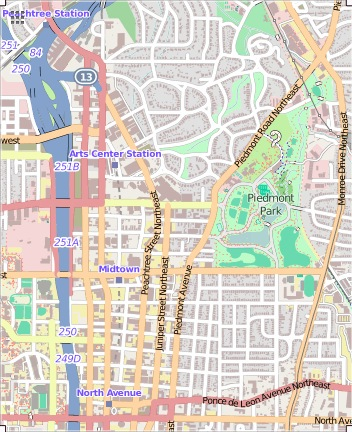
- Location within Atlanta Midtown Crum & Forster Building (Atlanta) Crum & Forster Building (Georgia) Crum & Forster Building (the United States)

General information
- Location: 771 Spring Street NW; Atlanta, Georgia 30308
- Opened: 1927

The Crum & Forster Building is a 1928 three-story building with a Renaissance façade with columns and arches located at 771 Spring Street at Tech Square in Midtown Atlanta.

== History ==
The building was designed in 1926 by a team of New York and Atlanta architects, Ed Ivey and Lewis Crook, who were both Georgia Tech graduates and helped establish the Architecture program at Georgia Tech in 1908, and opened in 1928 as a regional office for a national insurance firm.

In 2007, the Georgia Tech Foundation purchased the building, and sought permits to demolish the building as part of a plan to expand Technology Square. Preservationists fought the demolition and in August 2009, the Atlanta City Council and Mayor Shirley Franklin granted the building protective status as a historic landmark. The Georgia Tech Foundation appealed this decision. They instead purchased an adjoining property where a SunTrust Banks branch was previously located. In September 2013, the Georgia Tech Foundation demolished two-thirds of the Crum & Forster Building, leaving only part of its facade, to clear space for a High Performance Computing Center mid-rise.

As of late 2017, there are plans to build an 8,000-square-foot (740 m^{2}) restaurant in the remaining portion of the building, adjacent to a new 20,000-square-foot (1,900 m^{2}) food hall at the adjacent new CODA mixed-use development.
