= Lenox Park =

Lenox Park may refer to:

Georgia

- Lenox Park (Atlanta), historic neighborhood now part of the Morningside-Lenox Park neighborhood
- Lenox Park (DeKalb County, Georgia), a neighborhood and business park near/in the Brookhaven area of DeKalb County; headquarters of AT&T Mobility

New York

- Lenox Park, New York

North Carolina

- a historic district in Hendersonville
