= Ivey and Crook =

American architectural firm

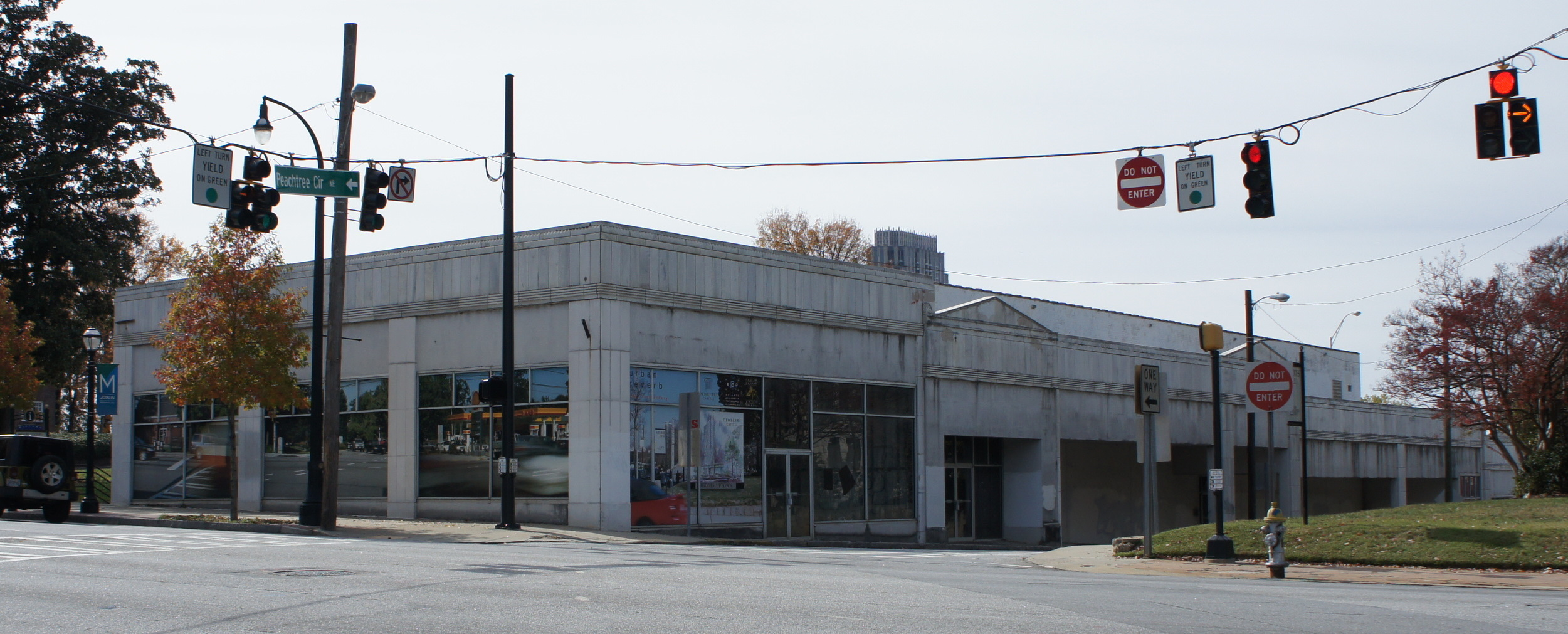
remaining building of the Rhodes Center

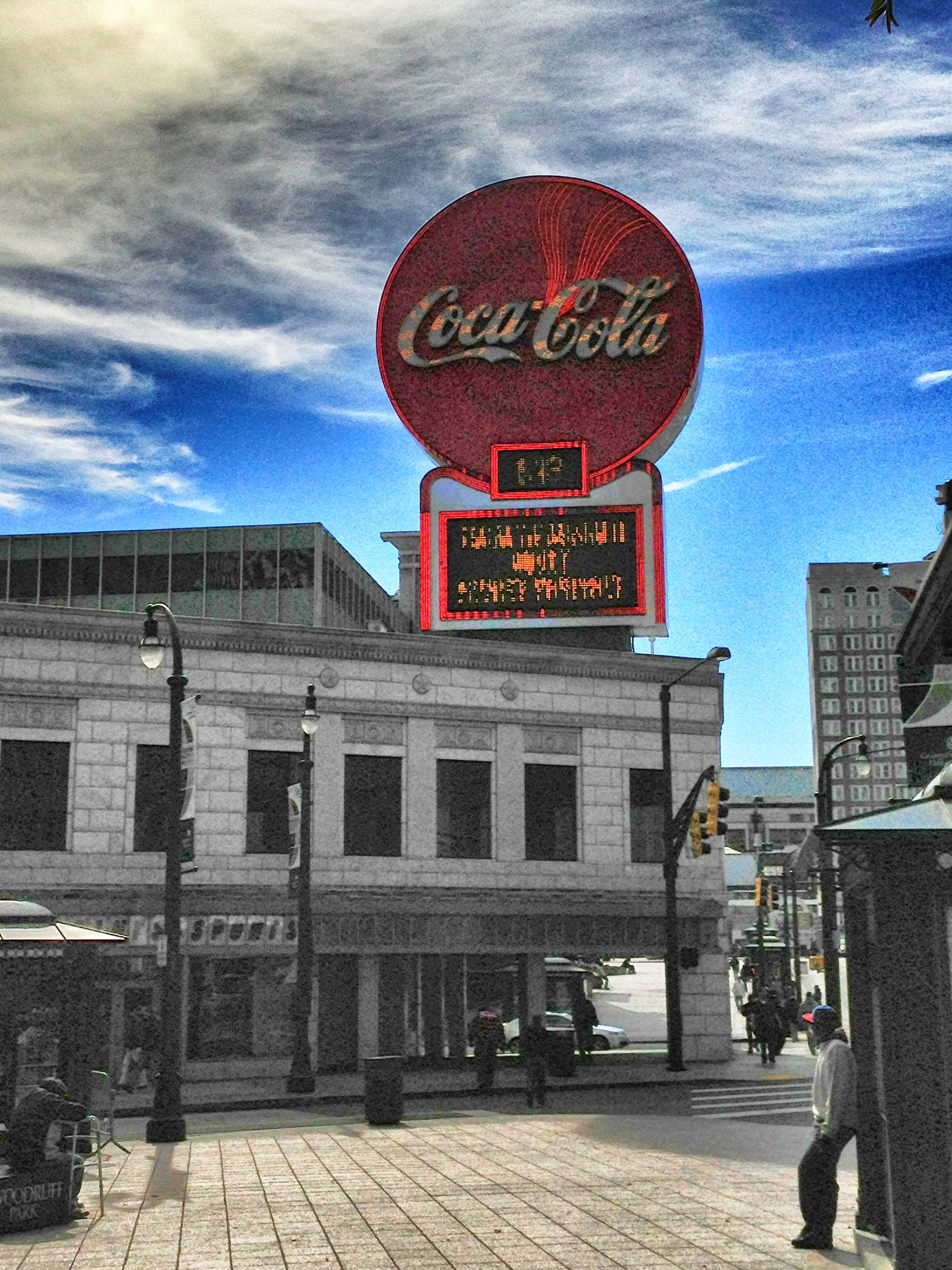
Olympia Building

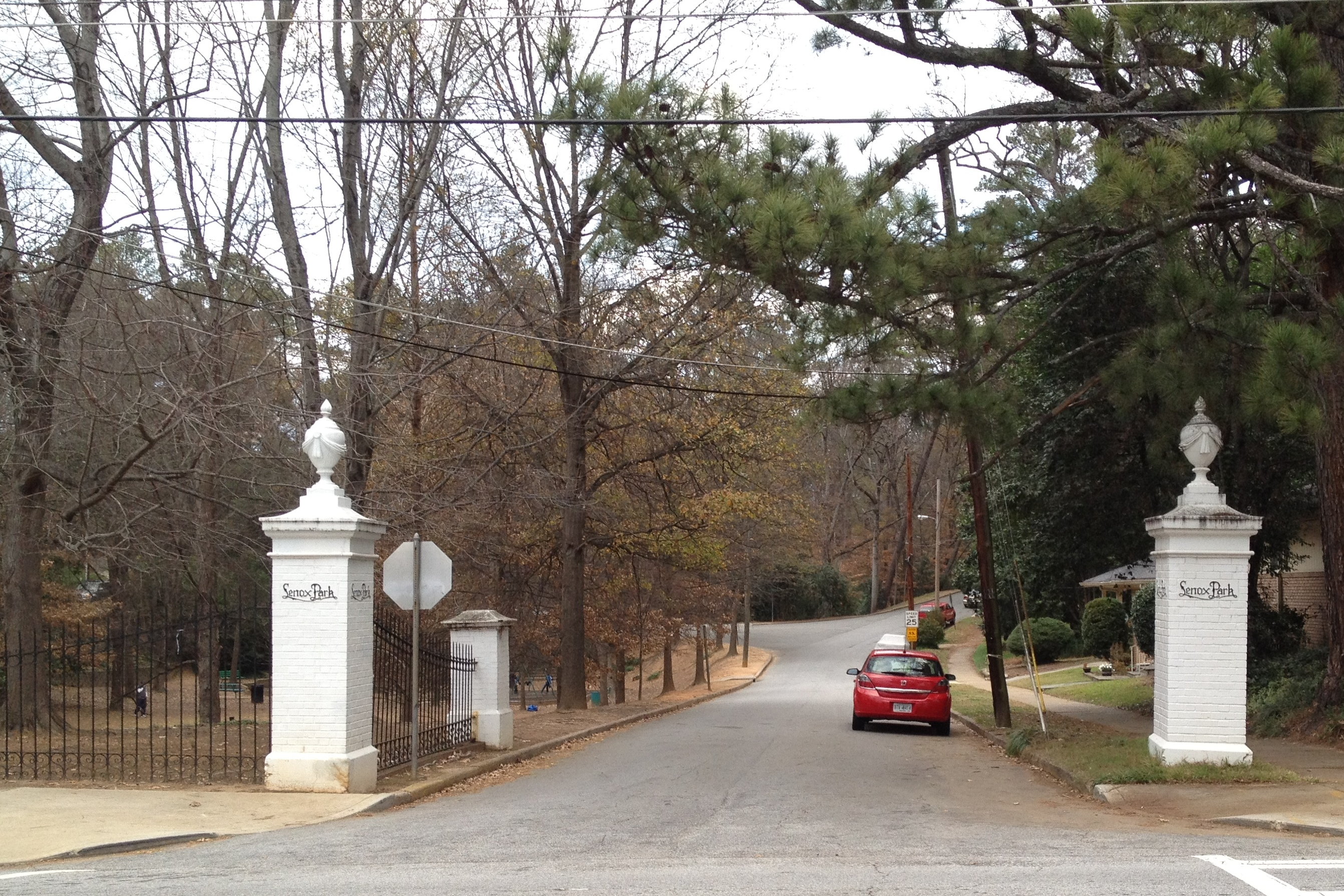
pedestals at entrance to Lenox Park

Ivey and Crook was an architectural firm active in Atlanta from the 1920s to 1960s. Works include:

- Rhodes Center (1937, Atlanta's first shopping center) and the Crum & Forster Building, both in Midtown Atlanta
- the Lenox Park (Atlanta) subdivision
- Druid Hills Methodist Church
- Lullwater House and the Candler Library at Emory University
- Olympia Building at Five Points
- Sigma Alpha Epsilon fraternity at Georgia Institute of Technology

Ernest Daniel Ivey and Lewis Crook were both Georgia Tech graduates who helped establish the Architecture program at Georgia Tech in 1908.
