= Commercial Row =

Coordinates: 33°46′52″N 84°23′4″W

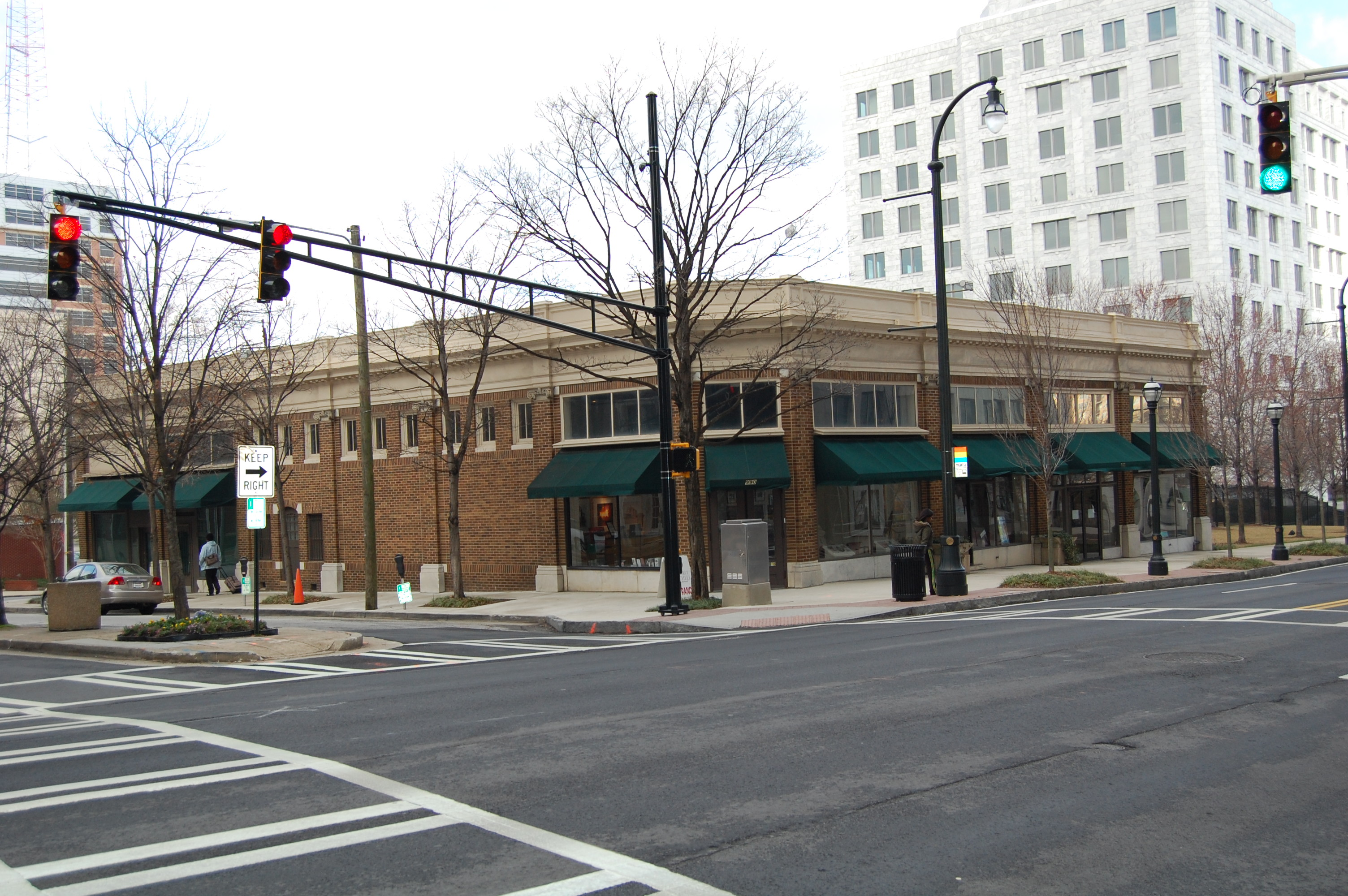

Commercial Row is a single-story brick building originally constructed in 1923. It consists of seven retail units or spaces historically occupied by individual tenants. The building is located at the corner of Peachtree Street, Peachtree Place and Crescent Avenue in the Midtown neighborhood of Atlanta, Georgia.

The building is today collectively numbered as 990 Peachtree Street, although the individual tenant spaces each have their own addresses, including 988 Peachtree Street, 90 Peachtree Place, and 92 Peachtree Place.

Commercial Row was built at a time when retail and residential development were reaching northward towards what is today known as Midtown, from Downtown Atlanta. The building represents both the unique character of Atlanta's development northward along the city's main thoroughfare, Peachtree Street, as well as the establishment of distinct neighborhoods outside the city center in the 1920s. Over the years, tenants in the building have included grocers, restaurants and small retail stores.

One of Atlanta's few remnants of that age of early development, Commercial Row sits on its original site and retains a high degree of structural integrity. As continuing commercial development removes traces of this earlier time of neighborhood community at the Tenth Street intersection, Commercial Row represents what the Peachtree Street corridor from Fifth to Fourteenth Streets looked like before massive redevelopment of the area in the 1980s, 1990s, and 2000s.

The building was designated a City of Atlanta Historic Building Site in 2008. Currently it is owned by the Atlanta History Center and is operated as part of the Atlanta History Center Midtown, which also includes the Margaret Mitchell House. Part of the building is used for programs and exhibits, while other portions are leased to commercial tenants including a restaurant and a grocer.
