= Olympia Building =

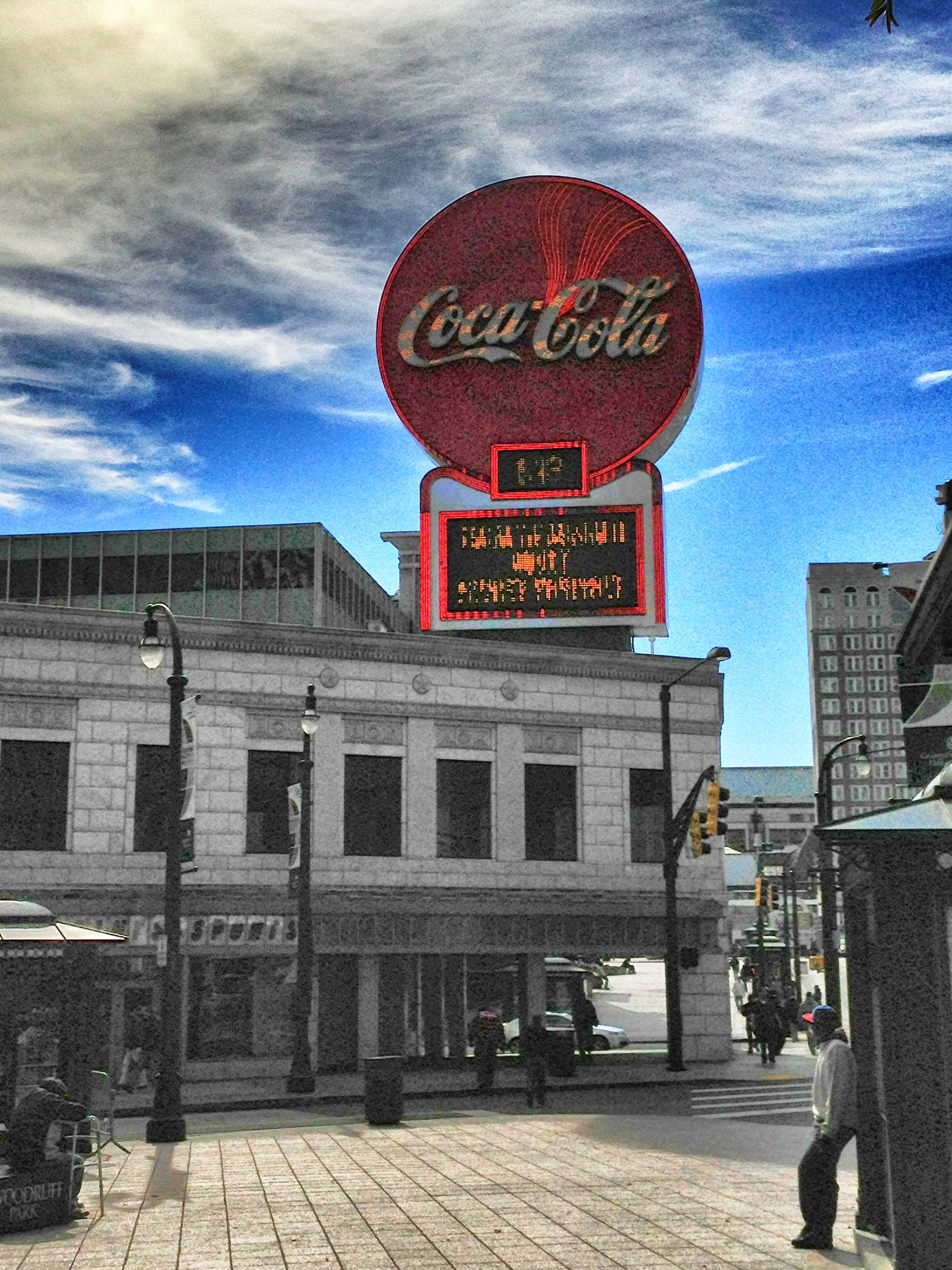
- Olympia Building seen from the north

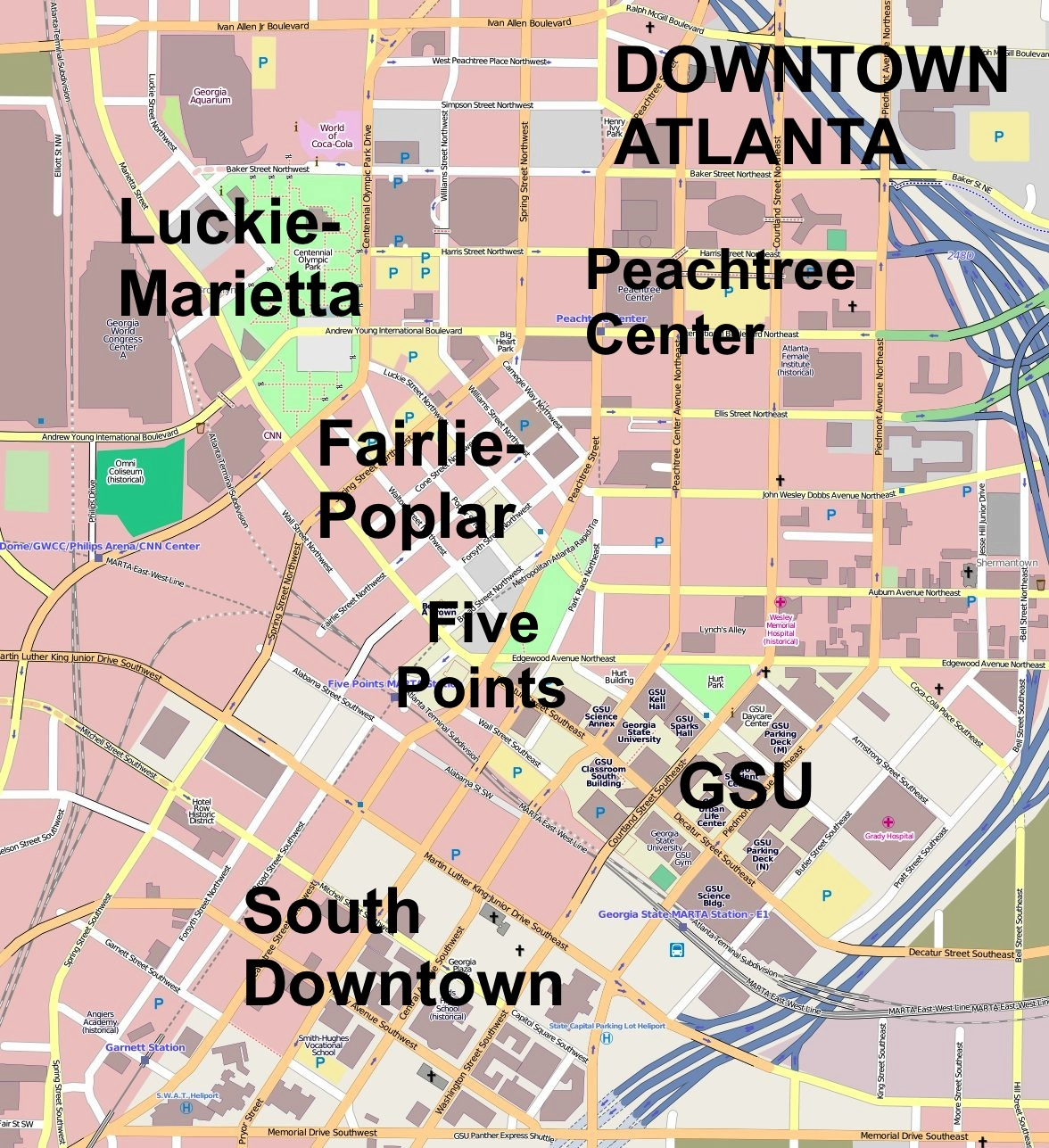
- Location within Downtown Atlanta Olympia Building (Georgia) Olympia Building (the United States)

General information
- Location: 23 Peachtree Street, Atlanta, Georgia, United States
- Coordinates: 33.754291°N 84.389334°W
- Completed: 1936

Technical details
- Floor count: 2

Design and construction
- Architects: Ernest Daniel Ivey and Lewis Edmund Crook
- Architecture firm: Ivey and Crook

Atlanta Historic Site or District
- Designated: June 13, 1990

The Olympia Building is a landmark at the absolute center of Atlanta, Five Points in Downtown Atlanta.

== History ==
The building was built between 1935 and 1936, architects Ivey and Crook. Since 2003, a flashing Coca-Cola sign has stood on top of the building, the space for which Coke pays $8,641 a month in rent (2012 data). As of September 2012 the building was owned by the State of Georgia (as a result of a $3.6 million gift from the Robert W. Woodruff Foundation just before the 1996 Summer Olympics) and was for sale, valued at $2.45 million. A complex rehabilitation of the building, beginning in 2015, includes the removal of all non-historic elements, of which there were many. This left only the building's terra cotta and marble facade and portions of its foundation. The iconic metal canopy will be reconstructed from historic images. Since October 2025, the building has housed Azalea Fresh Market, Atlanta's first municipal grocery store.
