= Rhodes Center =

First shopping center in Atlanta, Georgia

Coordinates: 33.7956°N 84.3883°W

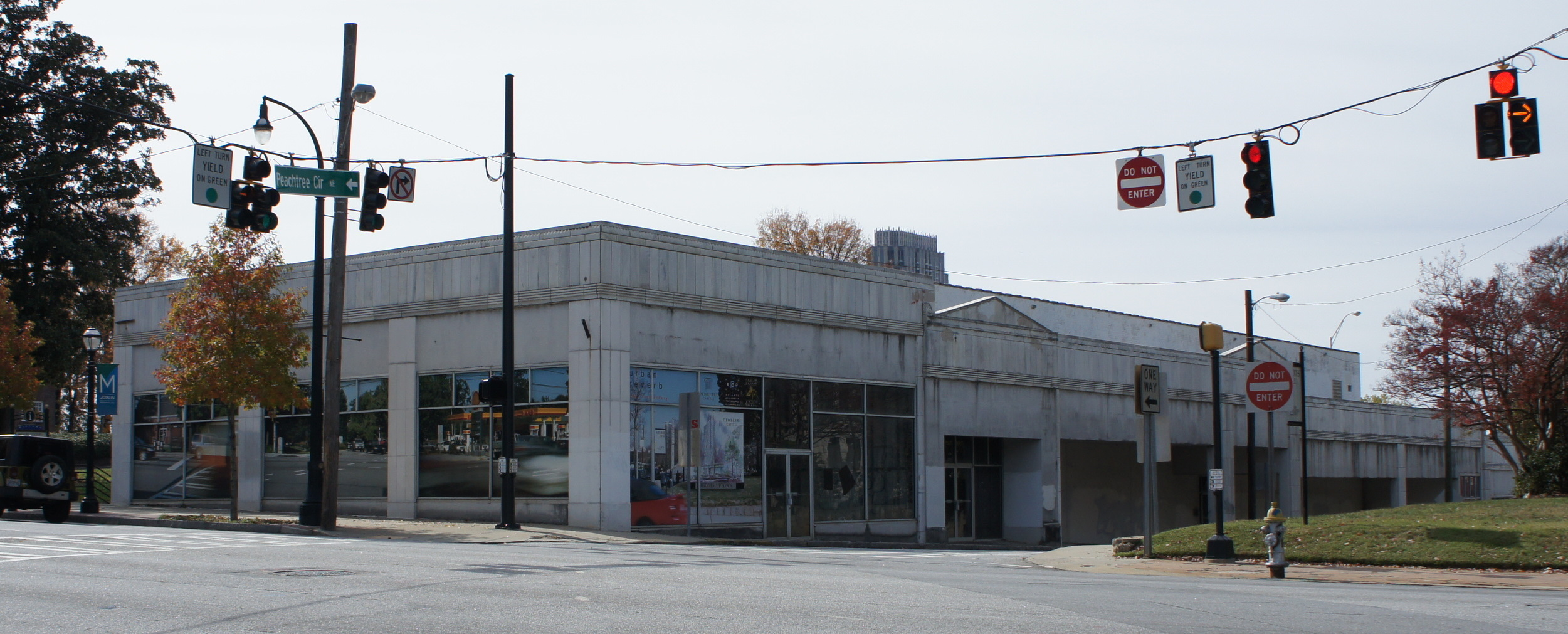
- The remaining south building of Rhodes Center in 2011
- Location: Midtown Atlanta, Atlanta, Georgia, United States
- Opened: 1938
- Closed: 1992
- Architect: Ivey and Crook
- Floors: 1

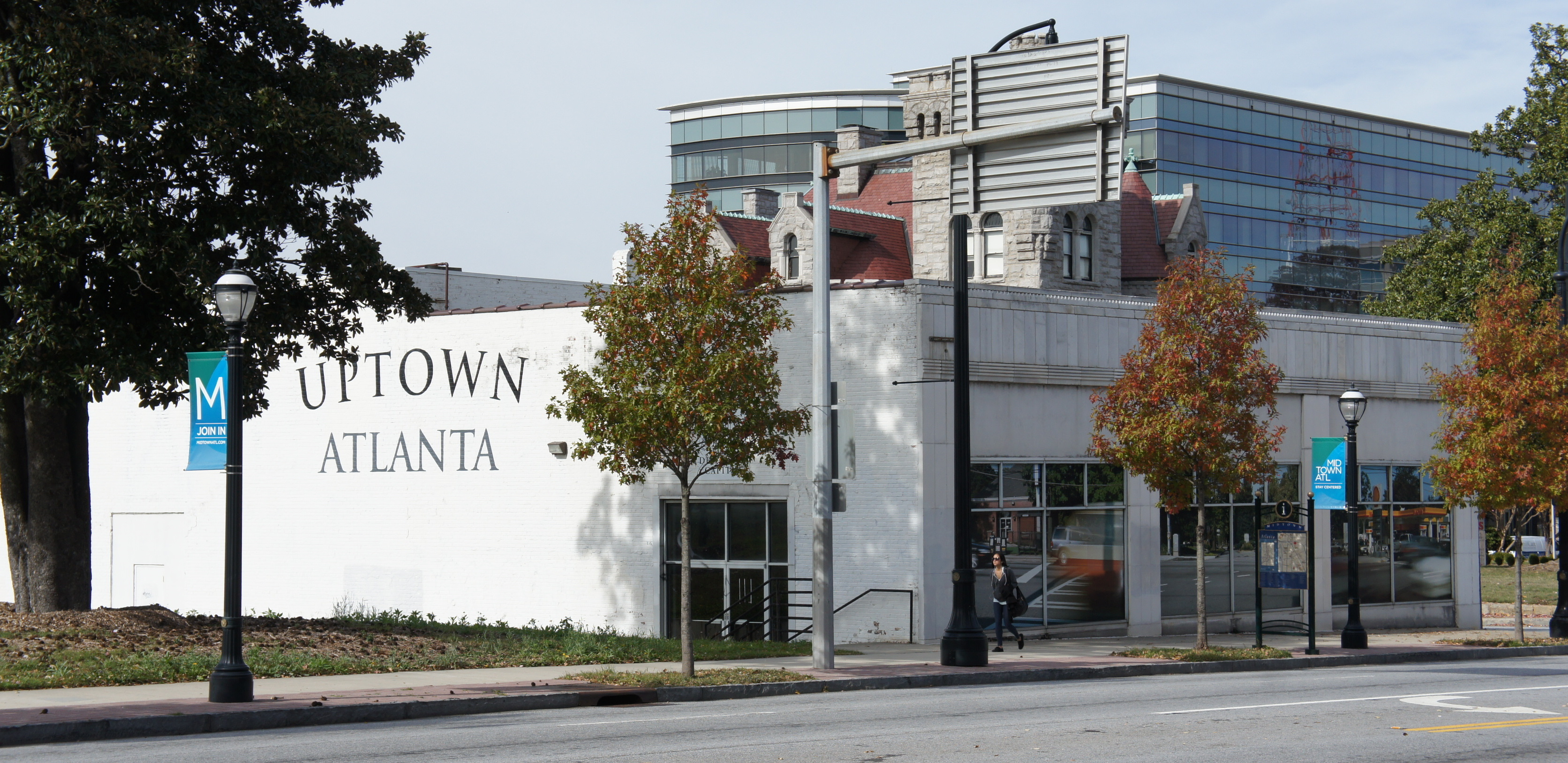
Back of remaining building of Rhodes Center showing developer's plans to market area as "Uptown Atlanta"

Rhodes Center was Atlanta's first shopping center. It was built in 1937 by architects Ivey and Crook and was one of the largest real estate developments in Atlanta during the Depression.

== History ==
It was located in Midtown between Peachtree Street and Spring Street. It consisted of one-story buildings that ran along the north, west and south sides of Rhodes Hall. The buildings were faced with Georgia white marble.

Today only the south building remains along with the single-block street named "South Rhodes Center NW". The offramp of the Buford Highway Connector to Peachtree Street runs along the building's south side. The site of the west building is now parking behind Rhodes Hall. The site of the north building is now occupied by part of the 1550 Peachtree building and the plaza in front of 1550 Peachtree.

In 2003, Dewberry Capital promoted the redevelopment of the south building, however as of 2011 this redevelopment had not taken place. Dewberry has acquired numerous properties in the area, historically known as Pershing Point but which Dewberry proposes to call "Uptown Atlanta". The properties include one at the northwest corner of Peachtree and 17th, Campanile at Peachtree & 14th, Peachtree Pointe at Spring and Peachtree, and the site for the proposed 13-story Dewberry Ansley tower.

== Tenants ==
A 1938 directory shows the following tenants:

- The air-conditioned Rhodes Theatre
- A&P superstore
- Anderson & McGee beauty salon
- Ann Hagan gift shop
- Calhoun radio service co.
- Dutch Oven bakery
- Georgia Milk Producers store
- May Air restaurant
- National Grain Yeast Corp.
- Oasis liquor store
- Rhodes Center florists
- Rhodes 5c and 10c store
- Roland's liquor store
- Waldrep and Griffin druggists
- Yellow Lantern library
- Dr. Zeigler clinic

== See also ==
- Rhodes Hall
