= Scheller College of Business =

Business school at the Georgia Institute of Technology

Coordinates: 33.776270°N 84.388050°W

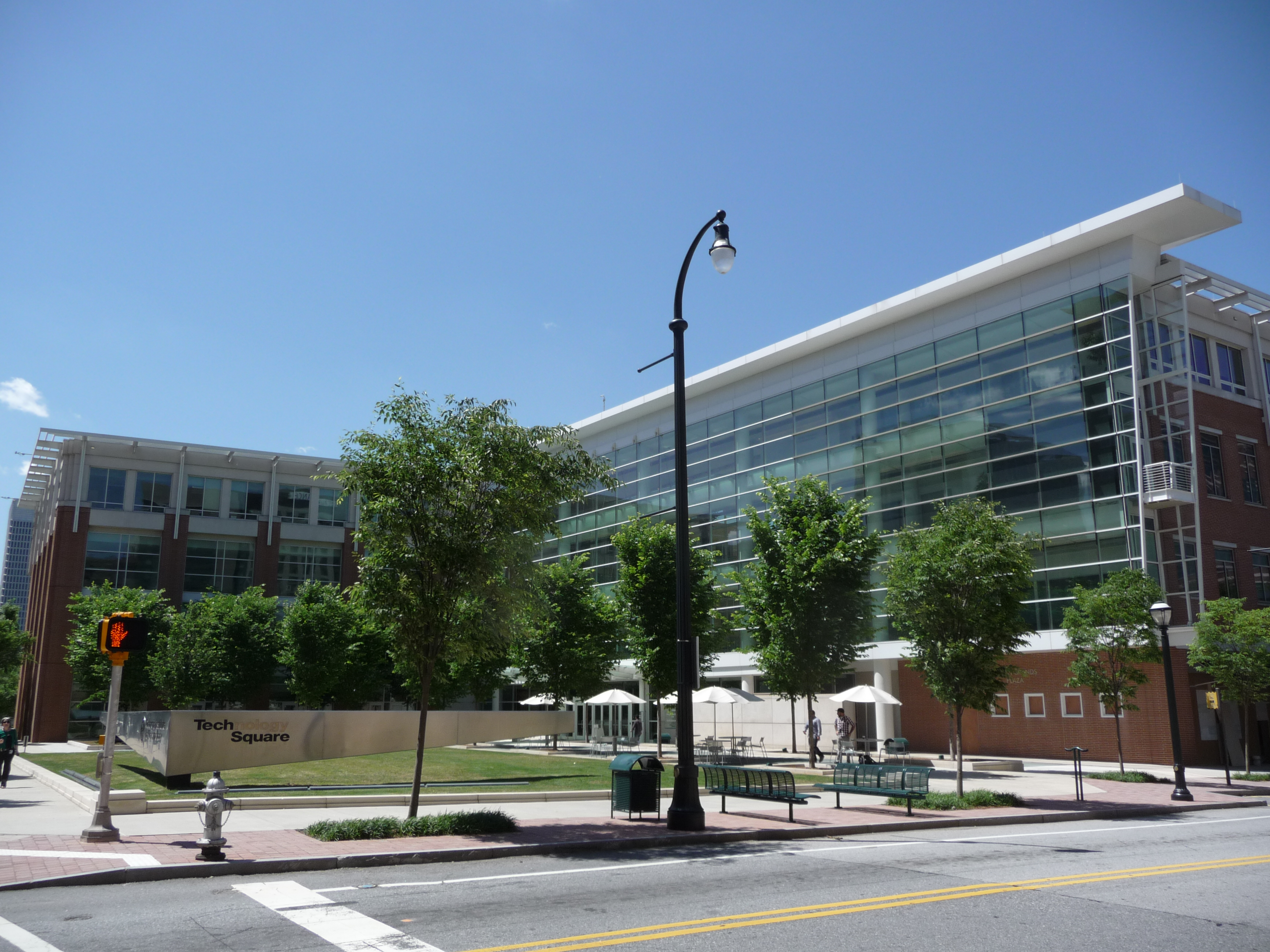
- Type: Public business school
- Established: 1912
- Parent institution: Georgia Institute of Technology
- Dean: Anuj Mehrotra
- Location: Atlanta, Georgia, United States
- Website: scheller.gatech.edu

The Scheller College of Business is the business school at the Georgia Institute of Technology, a public research university in Atlanta, Georgia. It was established in 1912.

== History ==
Georgia Tech's business school began in 1912 with the creation of the School of Commerce. In 1933, it was moved to the University of Georgia during the newly created Georgia Board of Regents' decision to consolidate Georgia's system of higher education. It would later become Georgia State University.

To meet the need for management training in technology, an Industrial Management degree was established in 1934, with a master's degree in the subject becoming the first professional management degree offered in the state 11 years later. The PhD program began in 1970.

In 1989, the College of Management, previously named the School of Commerce, combined with the social sciences, humanities, and economics departments to form the Ivan Allen College of Management, Policy and International Affairs. Nine years later, in 1998, the College of Management separated from the Ivan Allen College of Liberal Arts to become its own college.

In 1996, Georgia Tech alumnus and restaurateur Thomas E. DuPree, Jr. pledged a $20 million donation to the College of Management, resulting in the college being named the DuPree College of Management in his honor. However, while DuPree donated over $5 million to the college, his name was removed from the college in 2004 when the additional $15 million was not forthcoming. DuPree had recently resigned as board chairman and CEO of Avado Brands, the parent company of several chain restaurants that had recently filed for Chapter 11 bankruptcy. In a carefully worded statement, Georgia Tech President G. Wayne Clough remarked that while DuPree's name would be "reluctantly" removed from the college, "We retain the utmost respect for Tom DuPree and all of his remarkable accomplishments and many philanthropic activities." DuPree's donation of over $5 million to the college did fund nearly 200 scholarships although the remaining pledged donations were never provided.

On November 6, 2009, the College of Management received an anonymous gift of $25 million. The donor was later identified as Ernest Scheller, Jr., a Georgia Tech alumnus with a degree in Industrial Management (now known as a Bachelor of Science in Business Administration) and former chairman of Silberline Manufacturing, a Tamaqua, Pennsylvania-based pigment manufacturer. Scheller used $20 million of his donation as a one-to-one challenge grant designed to inspire charitable gifts and commitments from other donors. Fundraising for the challenge concluded on June 30, 2012. The remaining $5 million of Mr. Scheller's initial $25 million donation has been designated as discretionary funds to be dispersed by the deans.

In June 2012, the college announced a $50 million gift from Ernest Scheller Jr. This $50 million included the $25 million that had been given by him anonymously in 2009. It was the largest cash gift in Georgia Tech's history. As a result of Mr. Scheller's gift, the College of Management was renamed the Ernest Scheller Jr. College of Business

== Facilities ==
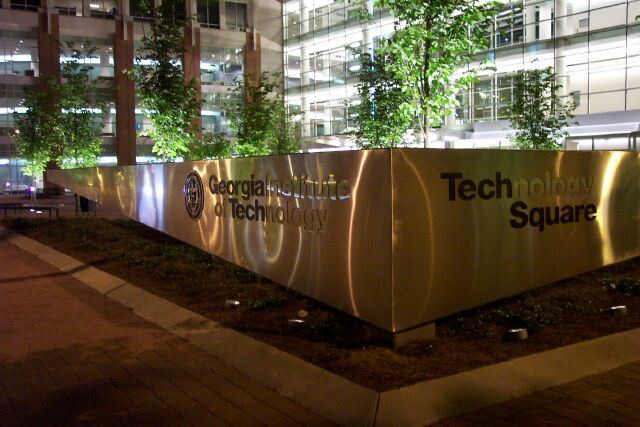
The Scheller College of Business in Tech Square

In 2000, Georgia Tech undertook a $180 million building project in Atlanta called Technology Square. This new multi-building complex, home to the College of Business, is a fusion of business, education, research, and retail space. The complex also houses The Global Learning Center, Advanced Technology Development Center, Economic Development Institute, Center for Quality Growth and Regional Development as well as the Georgia Tech Hotel and Conference Center. The facilities are located in Midtown Atlanta next to several major corporate headquarters such as Bellsouth (AT&T), The Coca-Cola Company, Turner Broadcasting System Inc. and Earthlink.

The purpose of Technology Square is to promote the formation of a high tech business cluster centered around a premier research university. Similar formations have taken place in cities such as Palo Alto and Boston, both nexuses of thriving high-tech corridors.

On November 24, 2006, the Scheller College of Business dedicated the 2,000-square-foot (190 m^{2}) Ferris-Goldsmith Trading Floor. The trading floor includes 54 dual-display computers as well as electronic stock information on the walls and is used to train all levels of management students to use financial analysis and electronic trading tools. Business faculty use the facility to research improved human performance in trading environments as well as create new financial service models. The trading floor houses the Quantitative and Computational Finance program.

In September 2018, Georgia Tech announced the beginning of the Tech Square Phase III initiative. The two-tower complex will add more than 400,000 gross square feet of space to Tech Square.

One of the two planned high-rises, Scheller Tower, will be a new resource for the Scheller College of Business that expands the college's footprint within Tech Square. The earliest the building will open is in 2026.

== Academics ==
=== Undergraduate ===
The Scheller College of Business offers a BS in Business Administration.

=== M.S. Major in Management ===
The Scheller College of Business offers an M.S. Major in Management program in both on-campus and online formats.

=== MBA Programs ===
Business school rankings

United States
- Bloomberg MBA: 20

==== Rankings ====
The Full-time MBA program is ranked No. 21 and the part-time Evening MBA program is ranked No. 11 by US News and World Report. As part of the 2024 - 2025 Best Business Schools ranking, Bloomberg Businessweek ranked the Full-time MBA program No. 16.

==== Curriculum and format ====
The Scheller College of Business offers three MBA programs: Full-time, Evening, and Executive.

===== Full-time MBA =====
The Full-time MBA is a two-year degree consisting of one year of required courses and another year of mostly elective courses. The program offers classes Monday through Friday and enrollment takes place once per year in August.

===== Evening (part-time) MBA =====
The Evening MBA program offers classes Monday through Thursday evening. The program enrolls twice per year, in January and August.

The Evening (part-time) MBA offers the same core curriculum and concentrations as the Full-time MBA program but allows students to take courses at their own pace with an average completion rate of 24 to 36 months.

===== Executive MBA =====
The weekend Executive MBA is a 17-month program with classes on Friday evenings and Saturdays for professionals with five or more years of professional work experience. Students can select one of two customizable tracks: Global Business or Management of Technology.

=== Postgraduate ===
The college offers a PhD in Management. It is limited to full-time students who will complete their entire doctoral program before leaving the campus. There are seven concentrations: Accounting, Finance, Information Technology Management, Marketing, Operations Management, Organizational Behavior, and Strategy and Innovation.

== Centers and Initiatives ==
=== Business Analytics Center ===
The Business Analytics Center (BAC) brings together industry leaders, Georgia Tech faculty, and business analytics students to support programs offered by the College and Georgia Tech, including an MBA concentration in Business Analytics, a Certificate in Analytics, and one-year interdisciplinary Master of Science in Analytics.

=== Cecil B. Day Program for Business Ethics ===
Named for Cecil B. Day, founder of Days Inns of America, the program supports the Institute of Leadership and Social Impact's (ILSI) Ideas to Serve program, the Net Impact program, an annual speaker series, and a grant for faculty who incorporate ethics into their curriculum.

=== Center for Finance and Technology ===
Through practical and rigorous extracurricular and experiential learning opportunities, the Center for Finance and Technology serves all Georgia Tech undergraduate and graduate students who are interested in pursuing careers in the financial services industry.

=== Center for International Business and Research ===
The mission of the Center for International Business and Research's (CIBER) mission is to ensure the long-term international economic competitiveness of the United States through the support of research, business education initiatives, and corporate outreach activities with forums, conferences, and thought leadership. It is one of only 17 national resource centers of excellence in international business funded by the U.S. Department of Education.

=== Financial Services Innovation Lab ===
The Financial Services Innovation Lab (FSIL) is a hub for finance education, research and industry in the Southeast and acts as a platform to connect faculty and students across Georgia Tech with the financial services industry and fintech entrepreneurs.

=== Institute for Leadership and Social Impact ===
The Institute for Leadership and Social Impact (ILSI) is an interdisciplinary center that promotes servant leadership and organizational practices through workshops, coursework, a major lecture series (the Impact Speaker Series), the Ideas to Serve student social innovation competition, the Servant Leadership Student Fellows program, and the Leadership for Social Good Study Abroad program.

=== Law, Data, and Design Lab ===
The Law, Data, and Design Lab is an interdisciplinary group of faculty and students working to increase fairness, efficiency, transparency, and access to justice in the civil and criminal legal systems in the United States and around the world.

=== Program for Engineering Entrepreneurship ===
The Program for Engineering Entrepreneurship is a collaboration between the Scheller College of Business, the College of Engineering, and the Woodruff School of Mechanical Engineering. The program's focus includes a graduate-level curriculum leading to a Certificate in Engineering Entrepreneurship, and short courses on a variety of topics for faculty members, scientists, and engineers, academic conferences, and seminars.

=== Ray C. Anderson Center for Sustainable Business ===
The Ray C. Anderson Center for Sustainable Business (ACSB), named in honor of Georgia Tech alumnus Ray C. Anderson, focuses on conducting research, educating students, and partnering with industry practitioners to support the development of sustainable business practices. The center works with faculty research initiatives, offers grants to students interested in business sustainability, and partners with other universities for the Global Social Venture Competition. It also helps supports the Idea to Serve and Carbon Reduction Challenge Competitions.

=== Steven A. Denning Management & Technology Program ===
The Steven A. Denning Technology & Management (T&M) Program is open to all Georgia Tech undergraduate students. Business and Engineering students who complete the program earn a minor in Engineering & Business. Computer Science and IT Management students earn a minor in Computing & Business. Students from all other colleges earn a minor in Technology & Business.

=== TI:GER® (Technology Innovation: Generating Economic Results) ===
The TI:GER^{®} (Technology Innovation: Generating Economic Results) program is a 12-month transdisciplinary program that prepares students for careers in technology innovation. MBA students work with PhD students from Georgia Tech's College of Engineering, College of Computing, and College of Sciences on a project in innovative technology with a possibility for commercialization.

== Notable College of Business Alumni ==
Name	Class year	Notability	Reference(s)
William L. Ball	1969	Former Secretary of the Navy	
Stewart Cink	1995	2009 British Open Champion	
David W. Dorman	1975	Former Chairman and CEO, AT&T Corp	
David Garrett	1955	Retired Chairman and CEO, Delta Air Lines	
Jack Guynn	1970	Former President and CEO, Federal Reserve Bank of Atlanta	
Alan J. Lacy	1975	Former CEO, Sears Roebuck and Company	
Robert Milton	1982	President and CEO, Air Canada	
Mike Neal	1975	President and CEO, GE Commercial Finance	
James D. Robinson III	1957	Former CEO, American Express 1977-1993.	
John Salley	1988	Four Time NBA Champion ( Detroit Pistons 1989, 1990; Chicago Bulls 1996; Los Angeles Lakers 2000)	
Derek V. Smith	1979	President and CEO, ChoicePoint	

== See also ==
- List of United States business school rankings
- List of business schools in the United States
