= David C. Garrett Jr. =

American businessman

David C. Garrett Jr. (July 6, 1922 – June 2, 2012) was an American businessman who was the CEO of Delta Air Lines from 1978 to 1987.

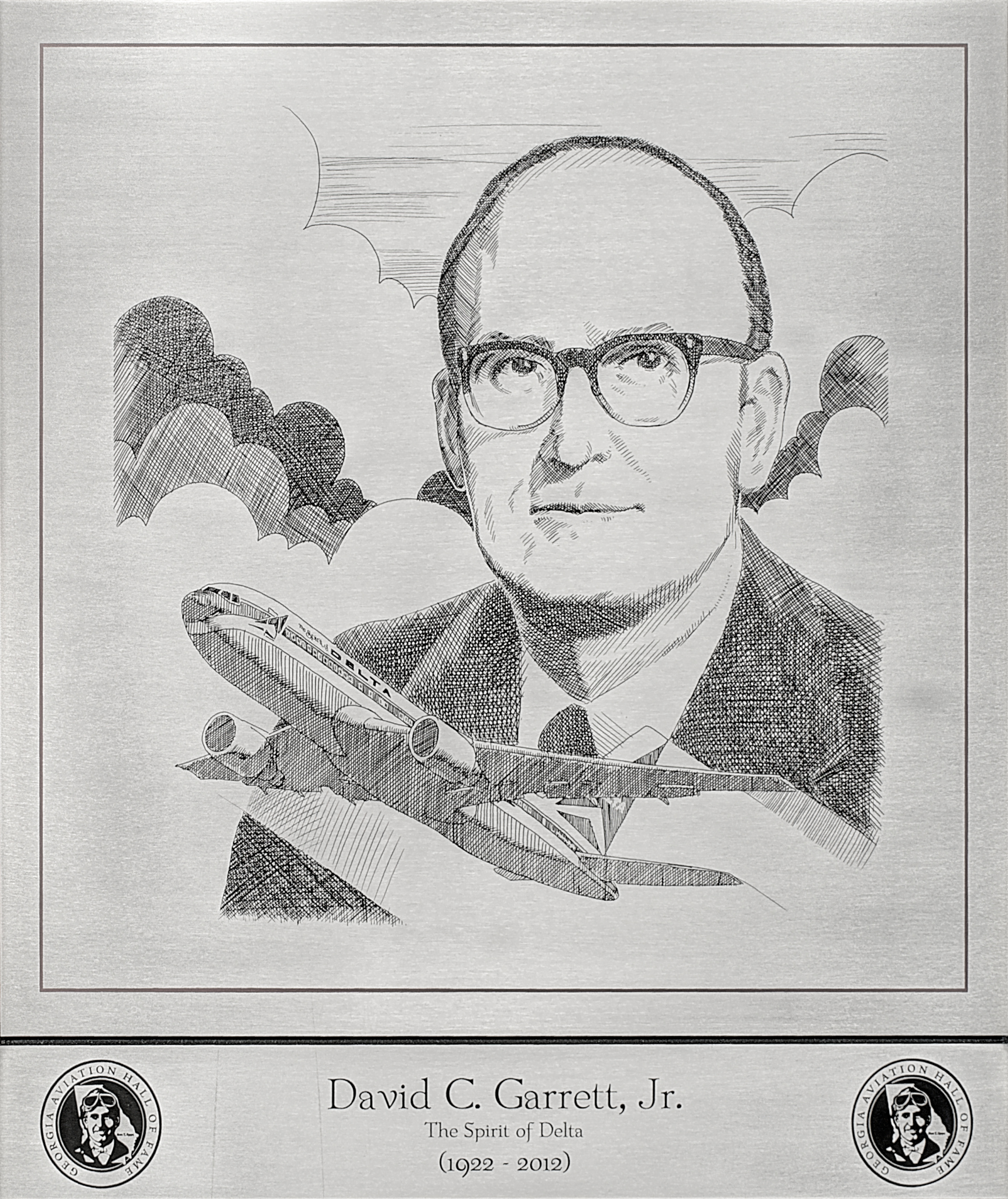
Plaque honoring Garrett at the Georgia Aviation Hall of Fame

He received his undergraduate degree from Furman University and was a 1955 graduate of the Georgia Tech College of Management Garrett won the Tony Jannus Award for Outstanding Achievement in the Field of Scheduled Air Transportation in 1983. He was a veteran of World War II. Furman University has an endowed chair in their Economics Department named in his honor. Berry College has an endowed professorship in Business Administration also named in his honor. He received an honorary degree in Doctor of Commerce from Oglethorpe University in 1999. He died on June 2, 2012, at his home in Dawsonville, Georgia.
