= CODA (mixed-use development) =

Coordinates: 33°46′31.0″N 84°23′15.5″W

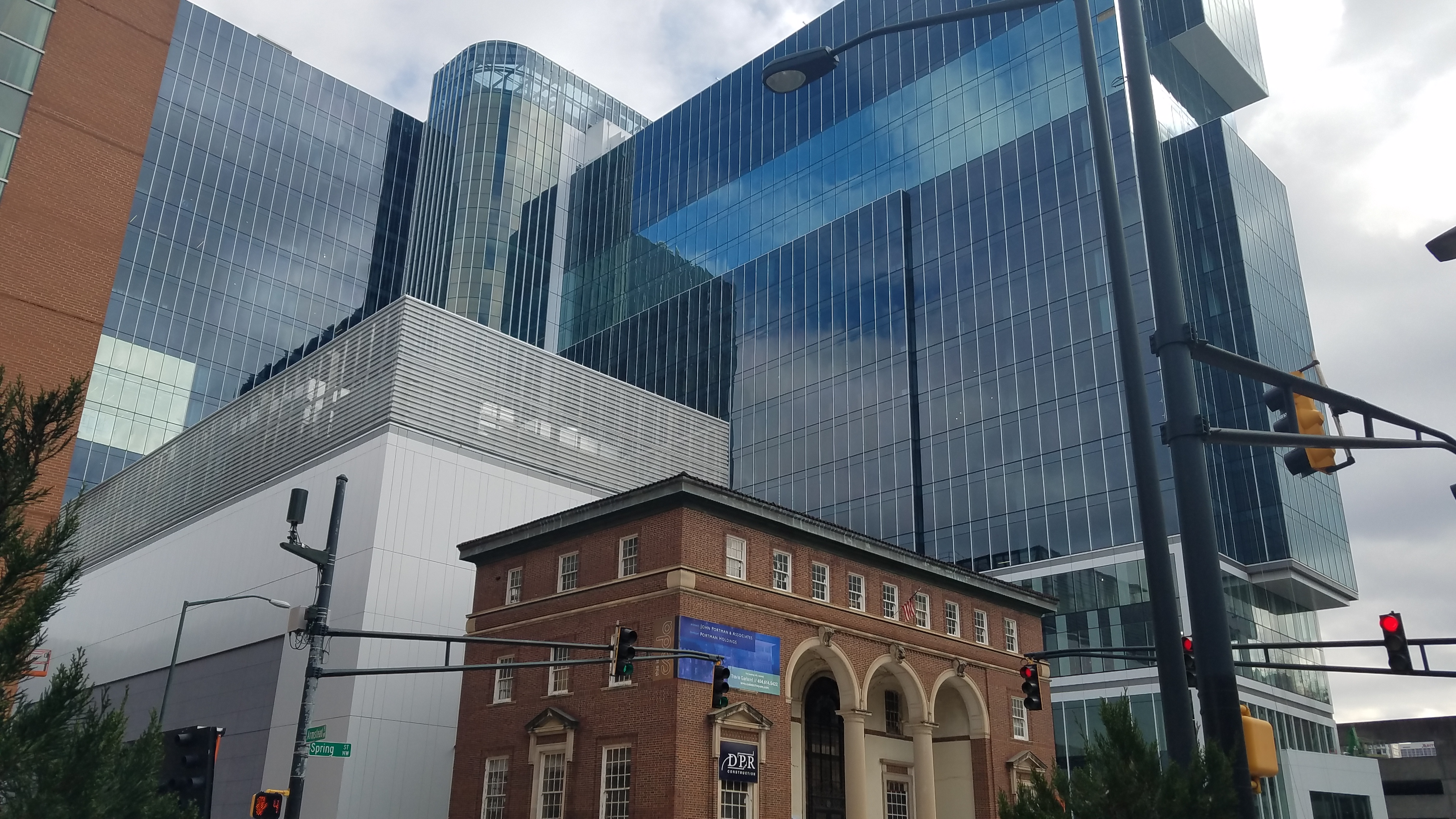
- Coda Building, seen behind the Crum & Forster Building
- Interactive map of the CODA area

General information
- Type: mixed-use development
- Location: Atlanta, Georgia, United States
- Completed: 2019
- Owner: HSRE and Portman Holdings LLC

Technical details
- Floor count: 21

CODA is a mixed-use development at Tech Square in Midtown Atlanta. The 770,000-square-foot (72,000 m^{2}) building contains 645,000 square feet (59,900 m^{2}) of office space, 80,000 square feet (7,400 m^{2}) of "high performance computing space/data center", 30,000 square feet (2,800 m^{2}) of street level retail space, and a 20,000-square-foot (1,900 m^{2}) "outdoor living room". There is also a 20,000-square-foot (1,900 m^{2}) food hall.

== History ==
The building was designed by Portman Architects, whose founder John C. Portman Jr. was a Georgia Tech graduate. Portman had been awarded the contract in 2015 to design what was then referred to as the High Performance Computing Center. Construction of the building cost an estimated $375 million, and it was officially declared open on May 23, 2019. As part of the construction, the nearby Crum & Forster Building was partially demolished, with the remaining portion of the building housing a restaurant and special-events space.

The building is notable for housing the world's tallest spiral staircase.

== Elevators ==
CODA features ThyssenKrupp's TWiN elevator system, the first twin-lift system in North America.
