= Five Points Monument =

Public monument in Georgia, United States

Coordinates: 33°45′16″N 84°23′23″W

- Location: Five Points, Atlanta, Georgia, United States
- Designer: George Beasley
- Material: Bronze; Steel
- Height: 36 feet (11 m)
- Dedicated date: 1996

The Five Points Monument is a large public monument in Atlanta, Georgia, United States. Located in the Five Points district, the monument was designed by George Beasley and installed in 1996.

== History ==
The monument was created during the leadup to the Centennial Olympic Games, hosted by Atlanta in 1996. George Beasley, who served as the coordinator for the sculpture program at Georgia State University, designed the monument, which is made primarily of bronze and steel. The monument was created at the studio at Georgia State and then moved to its current location via two flatbed trucks. According to Beasley, the monument experienced a rushed production in order to be in place in time for the 1996 Summer Olympics opening ceremony, with the monument installed one week before the event. The monument lies on a pedestrian island at the intersection of five streets, which gives the district of Five Points its name. These streets are Decatur, Edgewood, Marietta, Peachtree, and Whitehall Streets. The site once was home to a water tower, with Beasley saying that the sculpture is intended to represent that water tower "deconstructed and rearranged." Panels attached to the sculpture describe the history of the site, which is located adjacent to another sculpture, Atlanta from the Ashes (The Phoenix), located in nearby Woodruff Park.

== See also ==
- 1996 in art
