= Margaret Mitchell House and Museum =

Historic house museum in Georgia, US

- Crescent Apartments (Margaret Mitchell House)
- U.S. National Register of Historic Places
- Atlanta Landmark Building
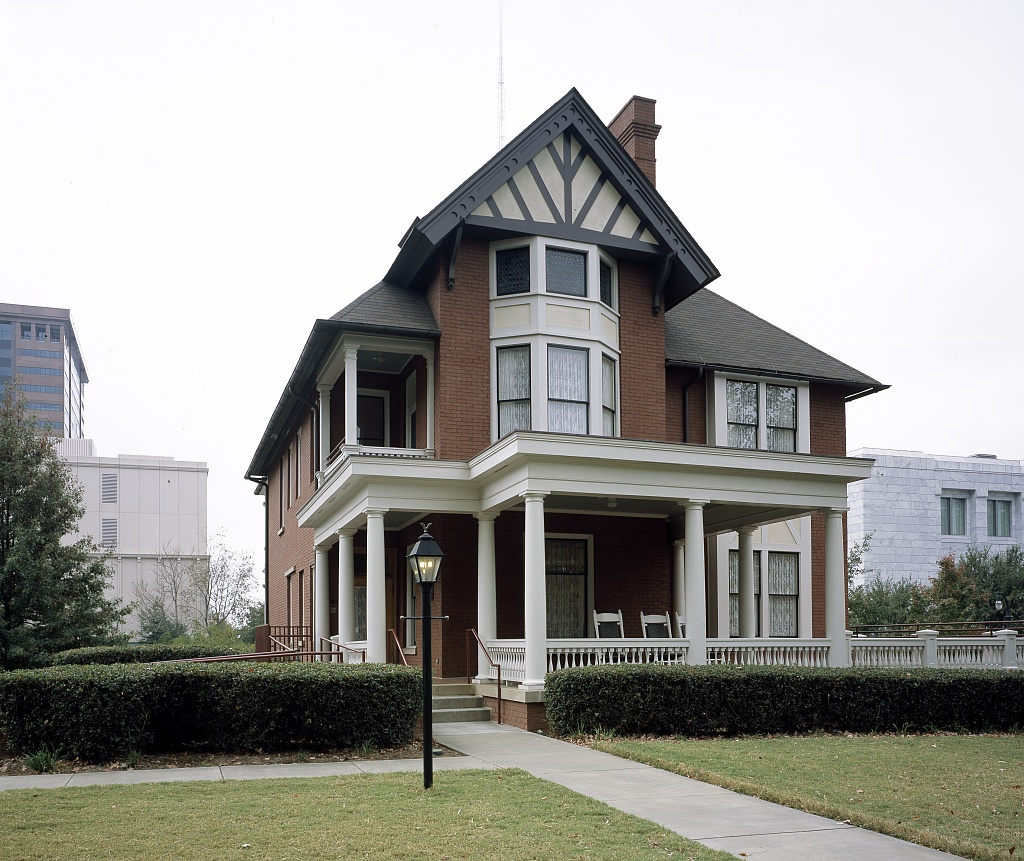
- Margaret Mitchell House
- Location: Atlanta, Georgia
- Coordinates: 33°46′53.02″N 84°23′4.62″W
- Built: 1899
- Architect: Denning, Mr.
- Architectural style: Tudor Revival
- NRHP reference No.: 96000649

Significant dates
- Added to NRHP: June 21, 1996
- Designated ALB: October 23, 1989

The Margaret Mitchell House is a historic house museum located in Atlanta, Georgia. The structure was the home of author Margaret Mitchell in the early 20th century. It is located in Midtown, at 979 Crescent Avenue. Constructed by Cornelius J. Sheehan as a single-family residence in a then-fashionable section of residential Peachtree Street, the building's original address was 806 Peachtree Street. The house was known as the Crescent Apartments when Mitchell and her husband lived in Apt. 1 on the ground floor from 1925 to 1932. While living there, Mitchell wrote the bulk of her Pulitzer Prize-winning 1936 novel, Gone with the Wind.

The house is listed on the National Register of Historic Places and is also designated as a historic building by the City of Atlanta.

This house serves as the heart of Atlanta History Center's Midtown Campus and it houses permanent exhibitions that focus on various topics surrounding the building's history.

== House history ==
The house was built as a single-family residence in 1899. Commercial development quickly overtook the neighborhood, however, and in 1907 the original family moved to Druid Hills. The house changed hands several times until the winter of 1913–14 when the house was moved onto a new basement story constructed on the rear of the lot. Given a Crescent Avenue address, the building was remodeled in 1919 and converted into a ten-unit apartment building, known as the Crescent Apartments, and "three brick stores" were built where the house had originally sat. Located in what was then Atlanta's largest business district outside of downtown, close to trolley lines, and walking distance from her parents' house, the Crescent Apartments was home to Margaret Mitchell and John Marsh when they married in July 1925. Unfortunately, the building's owner became over-extended, and it was sold at auction in 1926. The next owner, too, was driven to bankruptcy when the stock market crashed in 1929. Maintenance declined, contributing to Mitchell's characterization of their 650 square foot first floor apartment as "the Dump." By the fall of 1931, there were only two occupied apartments in the building, one of which belonged to the Marshes, but they, too, moved to a larger apartment a few blocks away in the spring of 1932.

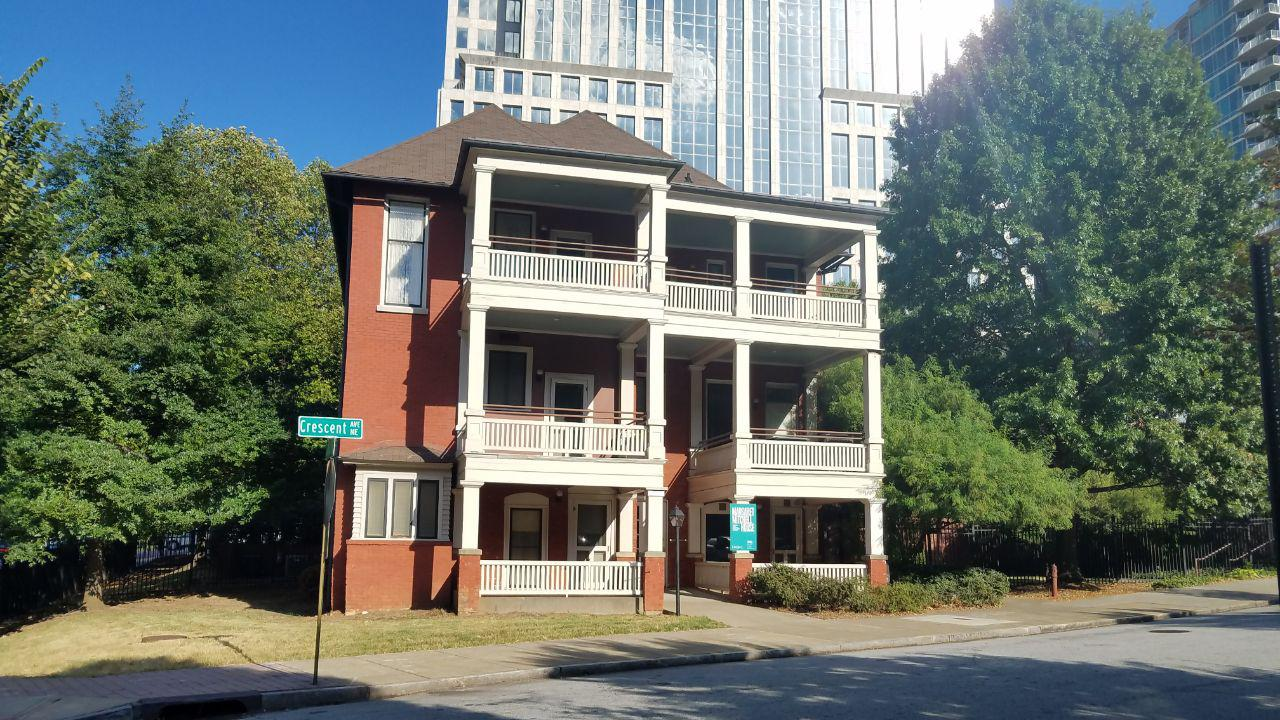
Rear of the Margaret Mitchell House

With a new owner, the Crescent Apartments were revived and continued to attract tenants until shortly after World War II. By then, the building was in poor condition, and in 1946 the porches were removed from the Crescent Avenue side of the building. (The original front porches were lost when the building was moved in 1913). By the 1950s, the building was mostly vacant and overdue for rehabilitation. There were a few commercial tenants, and the old apartments were popular with Georgia Tech students. In 1964, the opening nearby of Ansley Mall signaled the death knell for the old commercial district on Peachtree Street between 8th and 14th. But at the same time, the Crescent Apartments got a much-needed rehab and were reborn as the Windsor House Apartments.

In 1977, the last tenants were evicted and the building boarded up by a new owner who intended a major redevelopment of the area. By the time he and his company went bankrupt in the late 1980s, their only accomplishment was construction of a new office building at 10th and West Peachtree and the razing of dozens of historic buildings in the area.

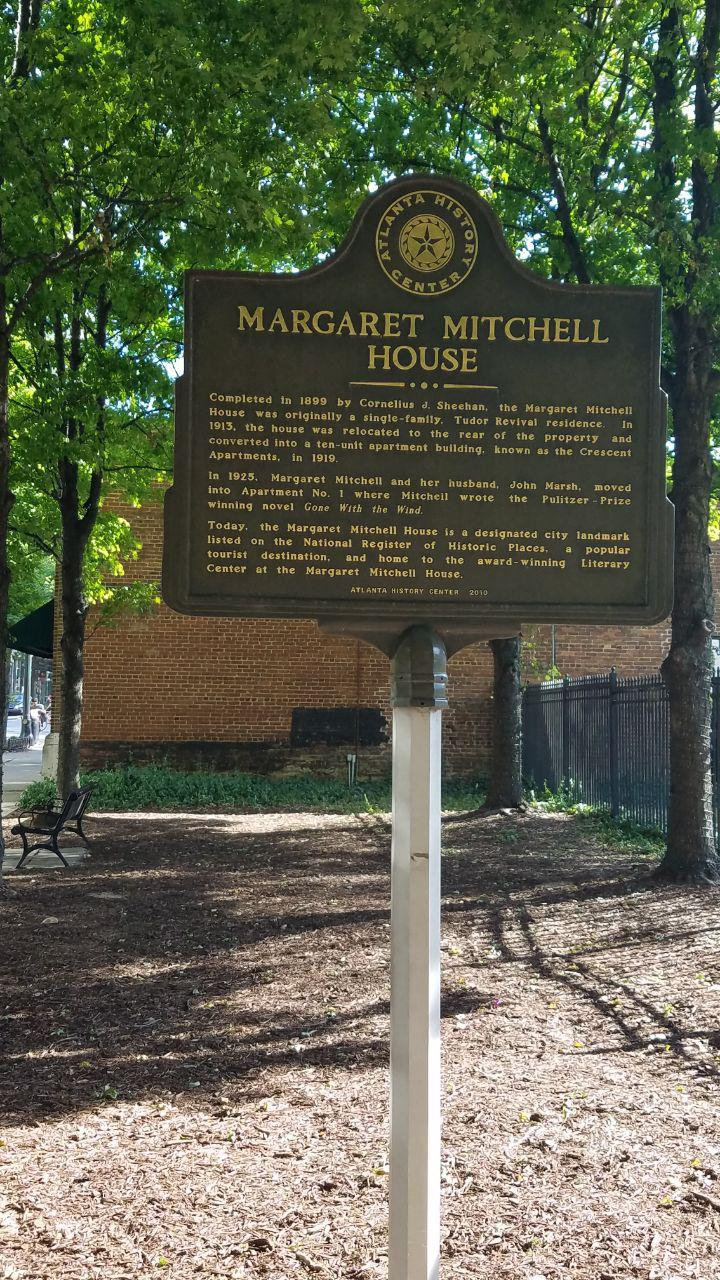
Atlanta History Center marker

The old Crescent Apartments continued to deteriorate, especially after a fire set in the southwest corner of the building did minor damage in the late 1980s. In 1989, Mayor Andrew Young helped secure Margaret Mitchell House's future by designating it a city landmark on the rolls of what is now the city's Office of Urban Design - Historic Preservation Division. When the decision was made to restore the property, the architectural history of the structure was taken into account, and the front of the house was restored as it was in 1899. The back of the building was restored as it was when Margaret Mitchell called it home.

However, another fire, presumed to be arson, destroyed much of the building in September 1994. Afterwards, Daimler-Benz Corporation, the German auto manufacturer, gave $4.5 million to restore the property and purchase its surrounding city block. With a Mercedes-Benz plant near Birmingham, Alabama, Daimler-Benz anticipated using the facility for hospitality events during the 1996 Summer Olympics.

In May 1996, only 40 days before the Centennial Games’ Opening Ceremonies, the house again was victim of an arson attempt. This fire occurred at a point where the restoration was almost complete, and all but Margaret Mitchell's apartment was damaged or destroyed.

After the 1996 fire, $2 million collected from insurance allowed the restoration to continue. The House was dedicated on May 16, 1997.

It was added to the National Register of Historic Places in 1996.

In 2024, the museum reopened with a revised exhibit that described more of the context and impact of both the 1936 book and 1939 film, both positive and negative.

== See also ==
- National Register of Historic Places listings in Fulton County, Georgia
