= The Castle (Atlanta) =

Building in Atlanta, Georgia, US

Coordinates: 33.7881°N 84.3847°W

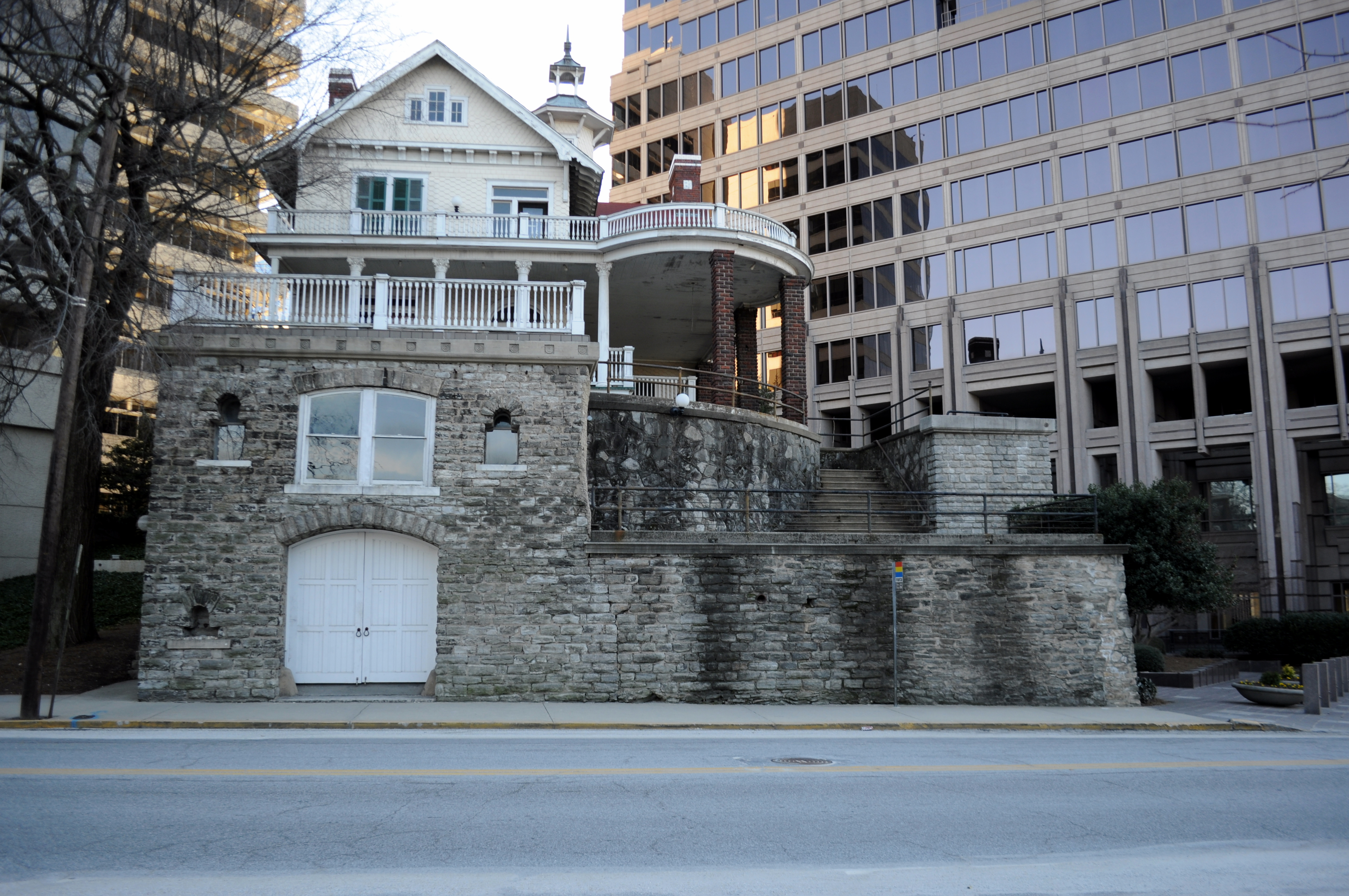
The Castle in Atlanta

The Castle, also known as Fort Peace, is the former residence of wealthy agricultural supplier Ferdinand McMillan (1844–1920). It is located at 87 15th Street NW in Midtown Atlanta, Georgia, next to the High Museum of Art. After McMillan's death, the building long housed facilities for Atlanta's arts community. The City designated The Castle a landmark in 1989.

1958-1960: GOLDEN HORNE ESPRESSO CAFFE AT THE CASTLE was created and operated by James Henry Lukshus who became the famous internationally known artist and fashion designer (haute couturier): Tzaims Luksus. His cafe was in the Castle's carriage room at street level and he lived in the stone studio directly above it. The Golden Horne Cafe was covered, with his photo playing his Lute, in 1959 by the Atlanta Journal (newspaper). The Golden Horne at the time was not only the first espresso cafe but also the most internationally famous cafe in Atlanta.

The Metropolitan Opera's famous soprano Leontine Price dined there whilst the Met Opera was on tour performing at the Fox Theater (Atlanta) In 1959. It was the writer James Dickey's favorite place for his poetry readings. Who's who in Atlanta frequented the continental Golden Horne Cafe for a cup of espresso new to Atlanta over regular coffee though the cost was several times that of a cup of regular coffee.

The Golden Horne even though medieval in decor and relaxed it was a first class gathering place for famous artists, writers, students, professors and Atlanta's high cafe society known only by word of mouth and secret with no commercial advertising and unknown by tourists. It was the place to go after a symphony concert or grand opera for a late night cup of the best coffee, tea and a slice of its famous rum cake or strawberry cheese cake and French cheese.

On many days philosophy and psychology professors from Emory University would hold their class discussions at the long trestle tables and with the art institute, directly across the street, art professors often held their art history discussions and life drawing classes at the Golden Horne Espresso Cafe in the Castle.

Musicians famous or not were allowed by James to perform on various instruments and sing and James was expected to play his Lute and sing Elizabethen and early French ballads several times each evening. When Leontine Price, the conductor of the Met Opera and entourage visited Leontine asked James to sing for her.

James Luksus managed his Golden Horne Cafe with princely and noble dignity similar to the finest cafes in Paris. It was Atlanta's Golden Age and the Golden Horne was Atlanta's Cafe de la Paix.

In August 2010 the building was sold to Mike Latham, an artist/architect from New York. As of that date Latham's plans for The Castle were unclear. In 2014 it became Atlanta's first pop up living room bar and music emporium.

The Castle was put up for auction in early 2020 and in December 2020 the winning bid of $3,225,000 was placed by The Simpson Organization, Inc., an Atlanta Midtown real estate investment firm.
