= Lenox Park, Atlanta =

Coordinates: 33.798633°N 84.354819°W

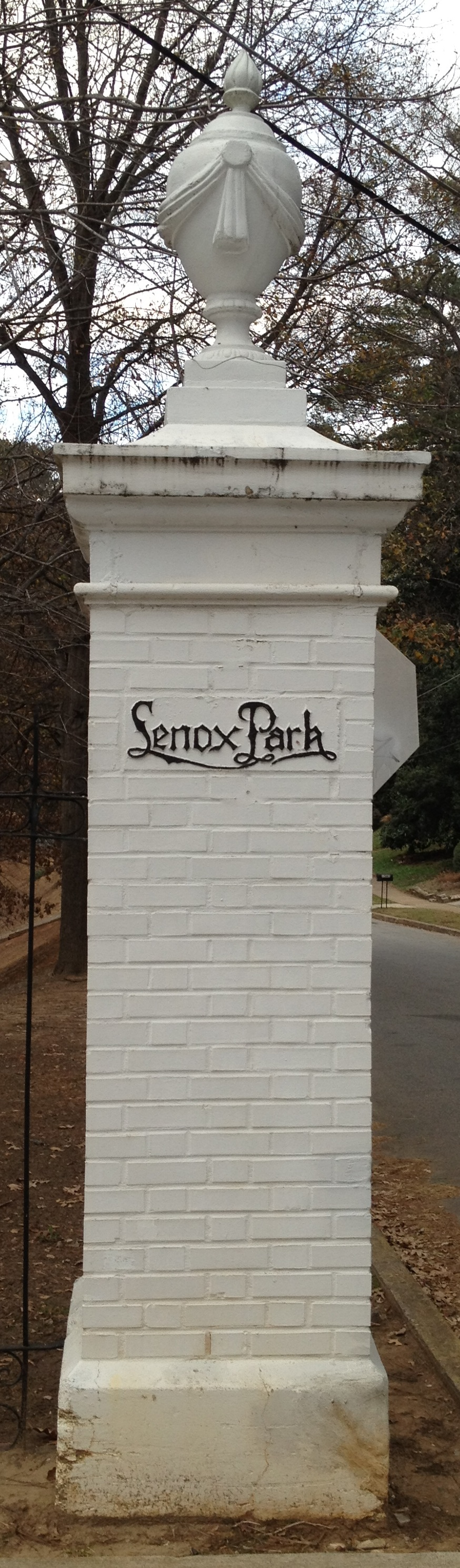
Lenox Park urn and pedestal marker at Sunken Garden Park

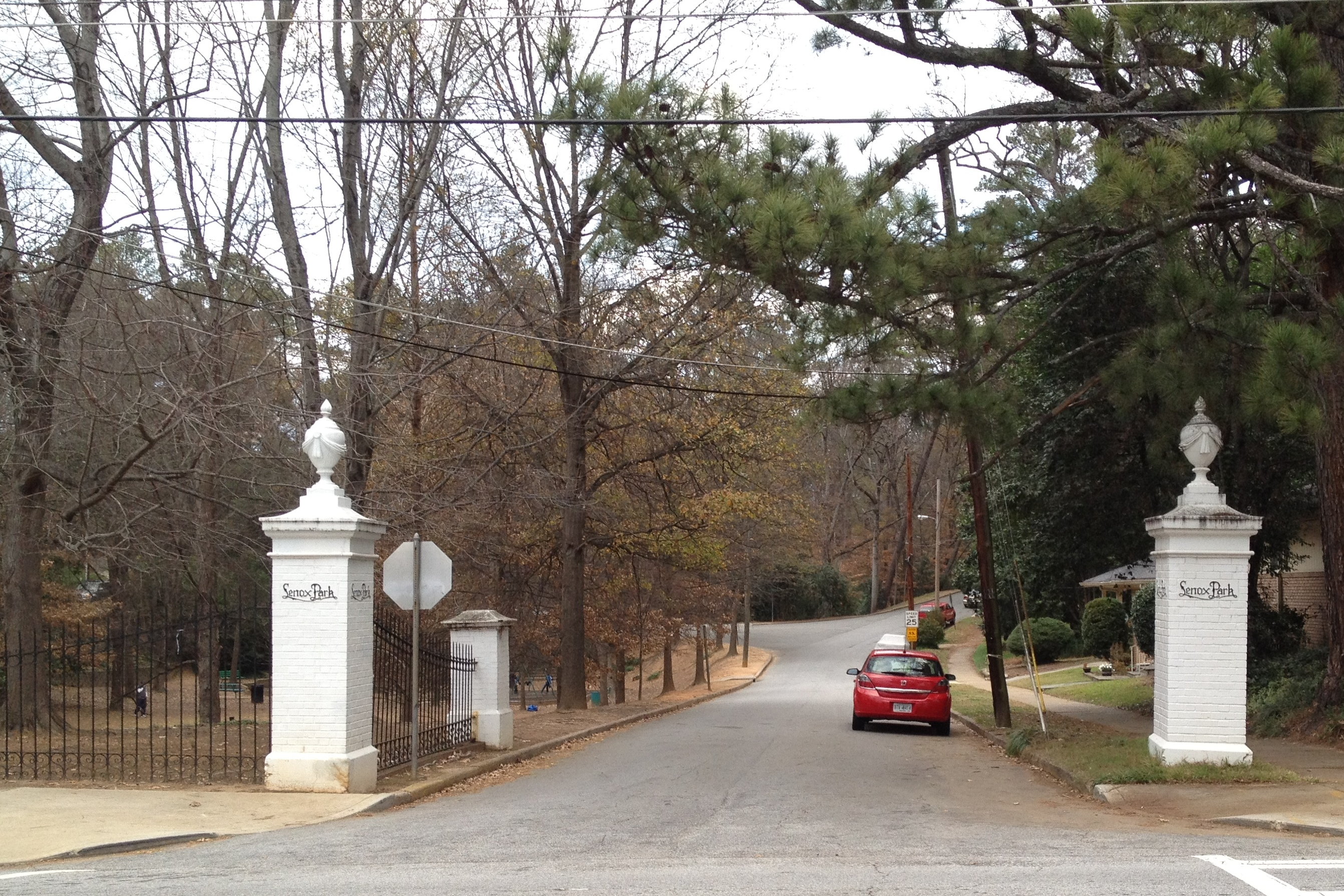
Lenox Park urn and pedestal markers at Sunken Garden Park

Lenox Park in the City of Atlanta was a subdivision begun in 1931 under the supervision of Ivey and Crook, architects. Today it forms part of the larger neighborhood of Morningside-Lenox Park. The iconic Lenox Park urn-and-column markers (several are still standing) were the inspiration for the more numerous Morningside-Lenox Park columns standing at the entrance to the larger neighborhood.
