= Advanced Technology Development Center =

Science and business incubator in Georgia, US

The Advanced Technology Development Center (ATDC) is a science and business incubator in Georgia, United States. It is part of the Enterprise Innovation Institute (EI2) at the Georgia Institute of Technology, and is headquartered in Technology Square, Atlanta.

== History ==
ATDC was formed in 1980 to stimulate growth in Georgia's technology business base, and admitted its first member company in 1981. It now has locations in Atlanta, Alpharetta, Athens, Augusta, Forsyth County, Peachtree Corners, and Savannah. In 2011, ATDC expanded its mission by merging with Georgia Tech's VentureLab and with the Georgia SBIR Assistance Program. ATDC has opened its membership to all technology entrepreneurs in Georgia, from those at the earliest conception stage to the well-established, venture-fundable companies.

More than 190 companies have been started at the Center, including firms such as NueMD, KontrolFreek, and Pindrop Security. Sponsored companies have created over 51,000 man-years of employment, generated over $12.7 billion revenue, generated over $100 million in profit to Georgia, and raised over $1 billion in venture capital since 1999. ATDC has been recognized by Inc. Magazine and Business Week as one of the nation's top incubators, and has won several other awards.
