= Five Points, Atlanta =

Intersection and area in Atlanta, Georgia, US

Coordinates: 33.75432°N 84.38979°W

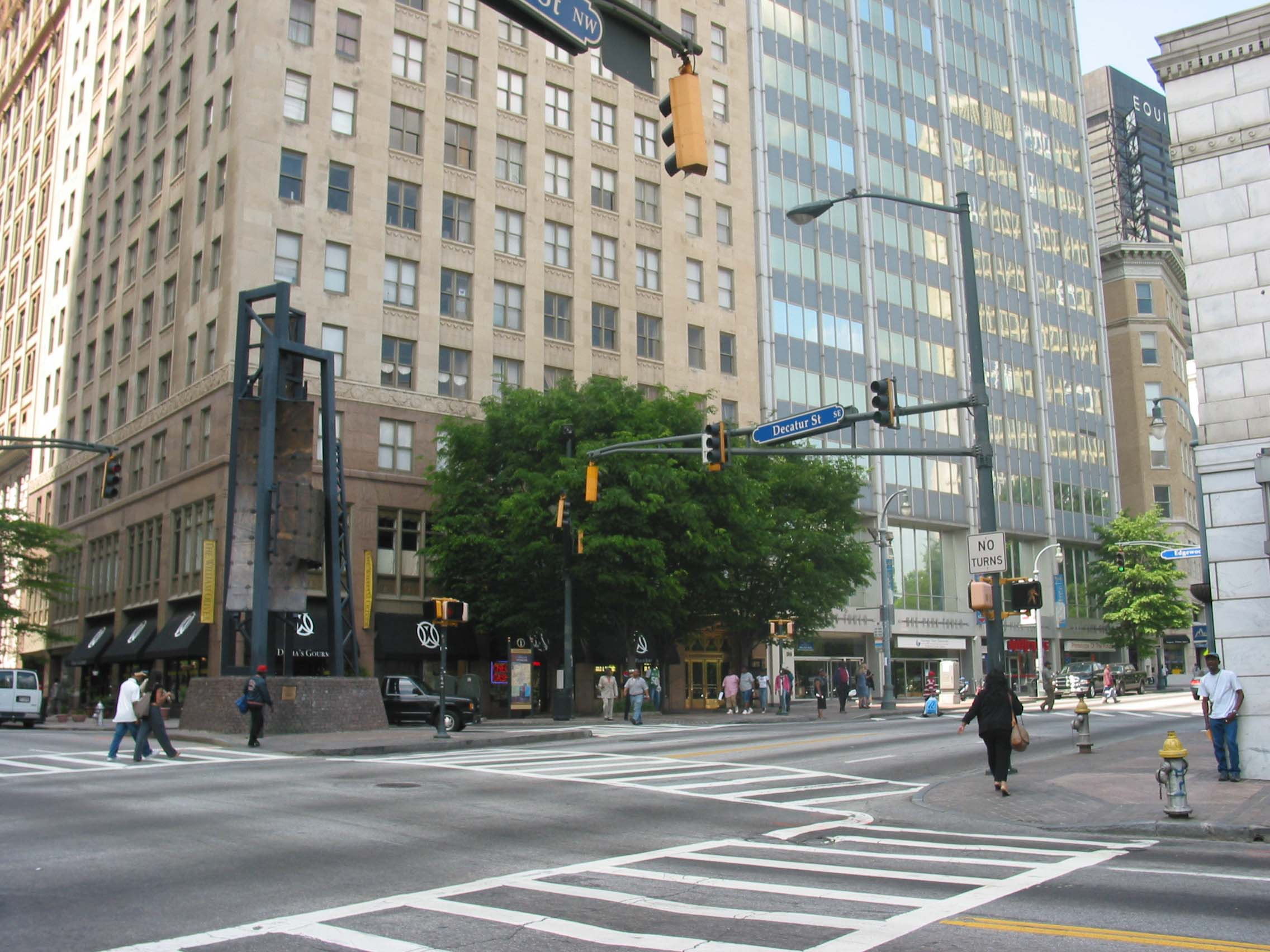
The Five Points intersection, looking northwest

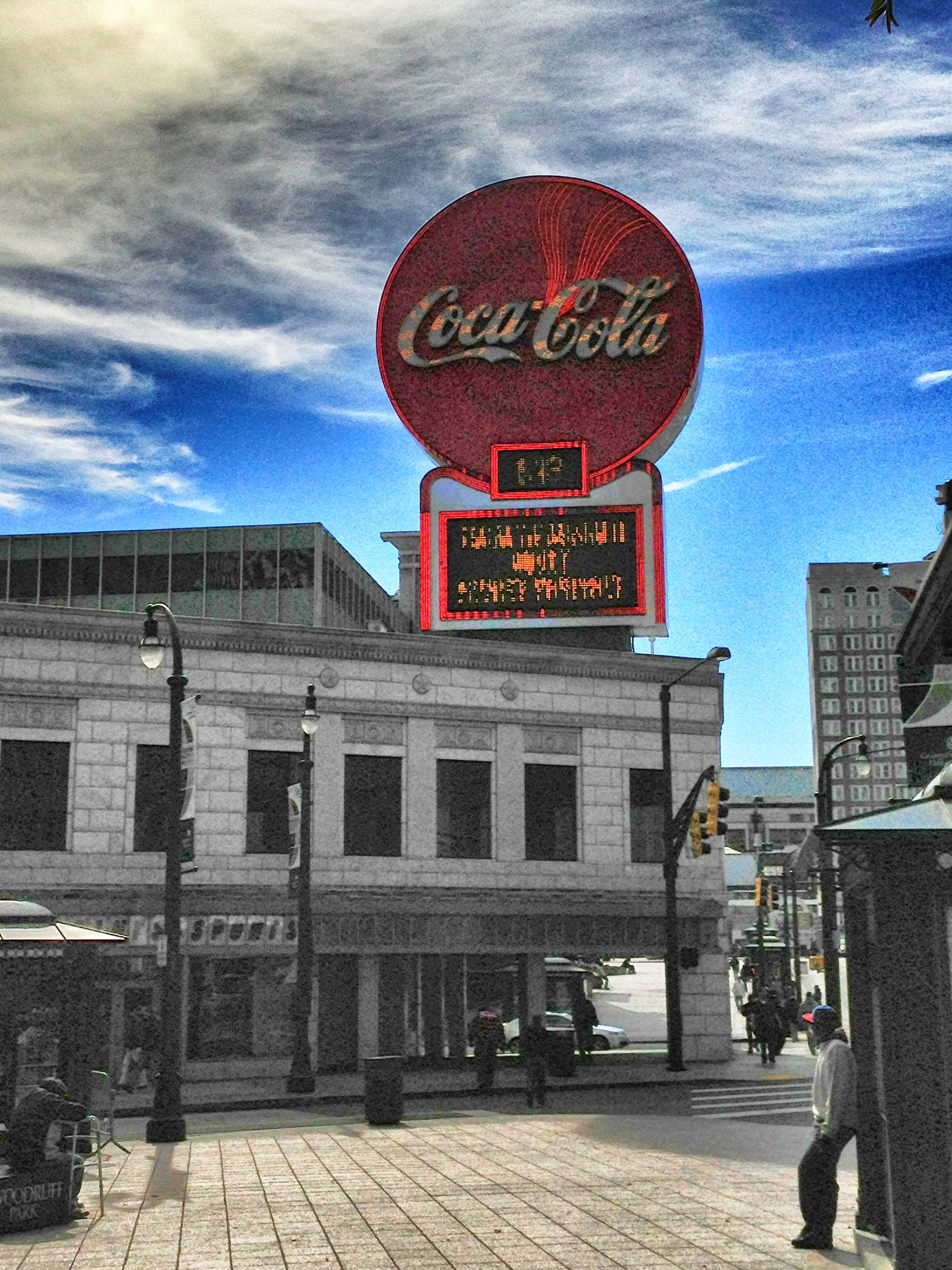
Coca-Cola sign atop the Olympia Building at Five Points, looking south

Five Points is a district of Atlanta, Georgia, United States, the primary reference for the downtown area.

== Description ==
The name refers to the convergence of Marietta Street, Edgewood Avenue, Decatur Street, and two legs of Peachtree Street (the south-southwestern leg was originally Whitehall Street, before a section of Whitehall was renamed as an extension of Peachtree Street to give businesses south of Five Points the prestige of a Peachtree Street address). Five Points is usually considered by Atlantans to be the center of town, and it is the origin of the street addressing system for the city and county, although four of the streets (except Edgewood) are rotated at least 30° clockwise from their nominal directions, along with the rest of the downtown street grid.

Woodruff Park is on the northeast corner of the intersection, between Peachtree Street and Edgewood Avenue. The Five Points MARTA station is one block south of the intersection on Peachtree Street.

A large round Coca-Cola sign overlooks Five Points, atop the Olympia Building on the east side of the intersection between Edgewood Avenue and Decatur Avenue. The nearly 50-foot tall sign has a 33-foot lighted neon face and faces up and down Peachtree Street. A lighted portion at the bottom of the sign gives the current time and temperature.

At the other corners of Five Points are located: Woodruff Park (northeast); the William-Oliver Building (northwest); Georgia State University's Andrew Young School of Policy Studies (southwest); and a parking garage (southeast). On a triangular island in the intersection stands the George Beasley sculpture Five Points Monument, alluding to the water tower formerly standing on the spot as well as the streetcar tracks that once existed in the intersection.

== History ==
Prior to the arrival of white settlers, Five Points was the intersection of two Creek Indian trails, the Peachtree Trail and the Sandtown Trail. In 1845, George Washington Collier opened a grocery store at what is now Five Points, and the store later served as Atlanta's first post office in 1846. In 1848, Five Points served as the location of Atlanta's first mayoral election. Moses Formwalt became Atlanta's first mayor, defeating Jonathan Norcross. In 1875, Atlanta's drinking water system began with the construction of three artesian wells at Five Points. The system delivered water to Atlanta's residents via wooden pipes.

Until the 1960s, Five Points represented the central hub of Atlanta. With the advent of urban sprawl and the development of shopping malls, the economic and demographic center of Atlanta shifted northward, and Five Points went into decay. By the 21st century, the area was revitalizing, mostly due to the expansion of Georgia State University, which maintains a large footprint in Five Points.
