= Tk accelis =

Part of German industrial group

tk accelis GmbH
- Type: GmbH
- Predecessor: thyssenkrupp Materials Services
- Headquarters: Essen, Germany
- Key people: Ilse Henne (Chief Executive Officer), Marc Schlette, Daniel Wodera
- Number of employees: 16,003 (2023/24)
- Parent: thyssenkrupp AG
- Website: www.tkaccelis.com

tk accelis GmbH, until June 10, 2026 thyssenkrupp Materials Services GmbH, is the material trading subsidiary of German industrial group thyssenkrupp AG. It is a global materials distributor, providing logistics and processing services for materials such as steel and plastics. The company is headquartered in Essen, Germany.

== History ==
tk accelis was formed in 1999 as part of the merger between Thyssen and Krupp, by combining the trading divisions of both companies, Thyssen Handelsunion AG and Krupp Hoesch International GmbH. At its inception, the new segment reportedly earned approximately 25 billion Deutsche Marks in revenue and had 28,000 employees. Also in 1999, Thyssen acquired the trading business of Mannesmann, which at the time reportedly had around 800 employees and annual revenue of 2.6 billion Deutsche Mark. It was subsequently continued as Thyssen Mannesmann Handel GmbH under the umbrella of Thyssen Handelsunion.

In the following years, the company expanded its international network and, in particular, opened up new markets in North America through the development of local service centers.

From the mid-2010s, the company increasingly focused on digital service offerings. In 2016, the “materials4me” B2C online shop was introduced. In 2017, Materials Services presented a proprietary system for the industrial Internet of Things (IoT), which is designed to integrate equipment from various manufacturers. The system, called toii, which is industrial Internet of things backwards, is intended primarily to advance automation in production and make processes more efficient.

In 2019, the company introduced the “Materials as a Service” strategy, which aims at expanding the services beyond the company's core business. The focus is on connecting equipment and the digital integration of sites. In 2021, the German trade magazine Logistik Heute reported on the introduction of the company's AI‑based software Pacemaker, which is intended to improve material flow and resource consumption in supply chains. In 2022, the online marketplace SteelBuy was launched. In January 2025, thyssenkrupp announced the acquisition of the Luxembourg-based company Waves to strengthen Pacemaker in the field of sustainability and open new markets.

In May 2025, thyssenkrupp announced that it was making preparations to establish, among other things, the Materials Services segment as an independent company in the coming years.

== Company structure and financials ==
tk accelis provides material logistics services for customers. It is divided in three so-called business units – Distribution & Trading, Processing, and Solutions. Over 16,000 employees work for the company at around 380 branches in more than 30 countries.

The company distributes, among other products, rolled steel, stainless steel, non-ferrous metals, as well as plastics, tubes, and other materials. In addition to processing of goods, the company also plans and manages supply chains for its customers.

The company reported total revenue in the fiscal year 2023/24 of 12.126 billion Euro. That year, it reported that it had generated most of its sales in Germany (28 percent), Europe excluding Germany (33 percent), and North America (37 percent). Its largest reported customer groups included the metalworking industry, aerospace, trade, mechanical engineering, as well as the construction and automotive industries.
