= Georgia Tech Foundation =

- Formation: 1932
- Headquarters: Georgia Institute of Technology
- Website: https://gtf.gatech.edu/

The Georgia Tech Foundation provides financial assistance to the Georgia Institute of Technology. It was founded in 1932 and chartered under the tax laws of the United States as a non-profit 501(c)(3) corporation.

== History ==
The Georgia Tech Foundation was established in 1932. As the result of a petition for a charter by several prominent alumni, including Y. Frank Freeman ('10), William H. Glenn ('10), Robert Gregg ('05), and Frank Neely ('04). Originally formed to sell insurance policies to alumni, in 1950 the organization's charter and bylaws were changed, and in 1954, the organization became known as the Georgia Tech Foundation, Inc.

== Support ==
In 2013, the Foundation provided $130.8 million in support of the Institute, including $20.7 million in scholarships, fellowships and loan funds to 3,563 students. As of June 30, 2013, the Foundation had $1.729 billion in assets. In 2013, the Foundation provided financial support for 200 students to participate in the G. Wayne Clough Georgia Tech Promise Program, a transforming scholarship program for Georgia residents whose family income falls below 150 percent of the federal poverty level. Students who qualify for the program can graduate from Georgia Tech debt free.
