= Druid Hills Presbyterian Church =

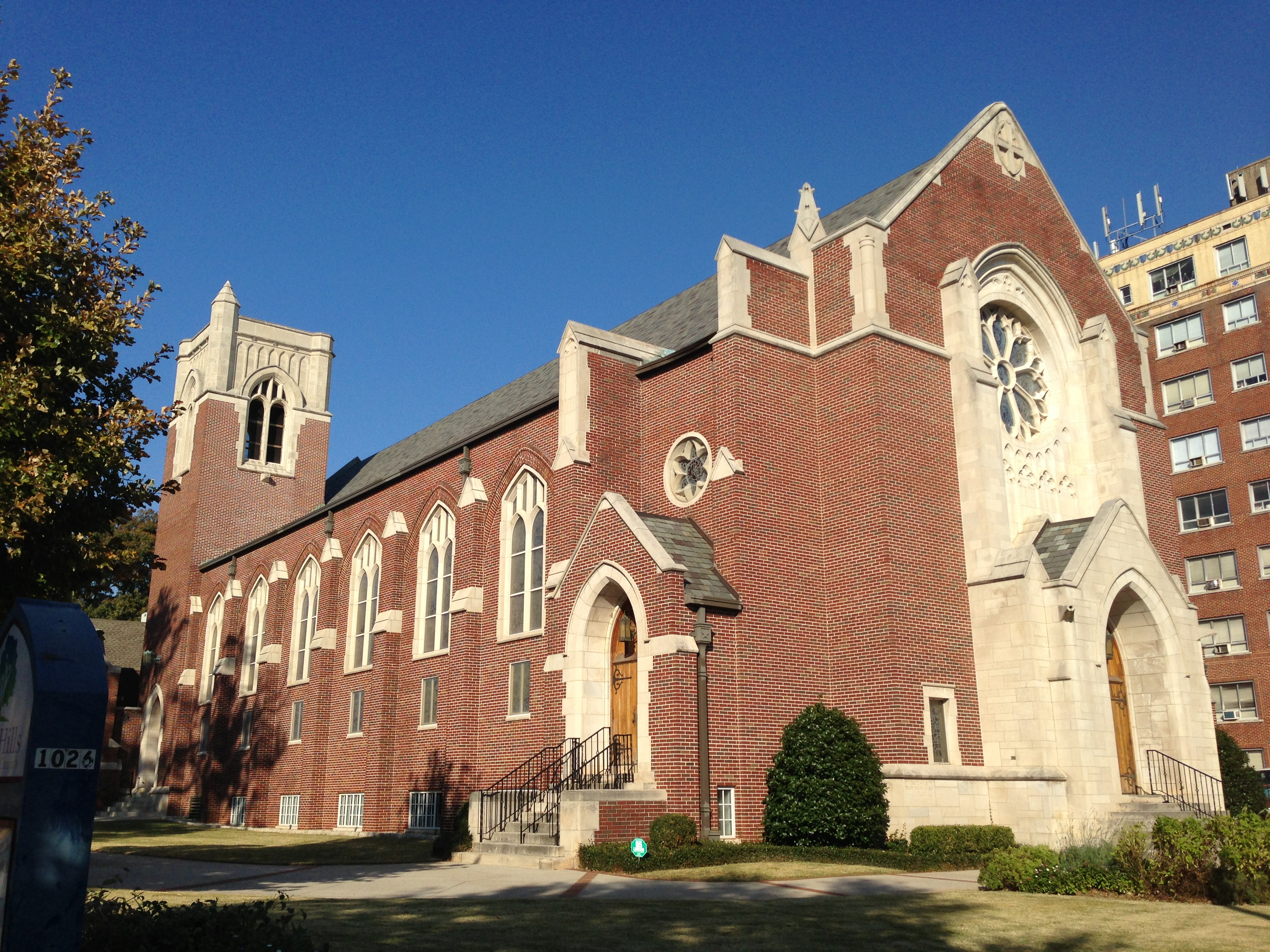
- Druid Hill Presbyterian Church (2012)

- 33°46′27″N 84°21′13″W
- Location: 1026 Ponce de Leon Avenue; Atlanta, Georgia, United States
- Denomination: Presbyterian Church (USA)

History
- Founded: 1883

Architecture
- Architect: Francis Palmer Smith
- Architectural type: Gothic Revival
- Completed: 1940

Druid Hills Presbyterian Church is a historic Presbyterian church in Atlanta, Georgia, United States. The church was founded in 1883 in downtown Atlanta and moved to near the Druid Hills neighborhood in 1910. The current church building, designed by Francis Palmer Smith, was completed in 1940 and is located in the Virginia–Highland neighborhood.

== History ==
The church, originally known as Fourth Presbyterian Church, was established in 1883. Originally located in downtown Atlanta, by 1910 the church was renamed and moved to a location at the intersection of North Highland Avenue and Blue Ridge Avenue in northeast Atlanta. Several years after this move, in 1924, the church once again moved to its current location on nearby Ponce de Leon Avenue. This new property was purchased by the church from Lucian Lamar Knight, a church member who is notable for having founded the Georgia Archives. The previous year, the church had commissioned Atlanta architect Francis Palmer Smith to design the Sunday school building for the church. Smith, who at this time was the head of the architecture school at Georgia Tech, had designed several buildings in the nearby Druid Hills neighborhood of Atlanta. In 1939, Smith was once again commissioned by the church to design a new sanctuary for the congregation, which was completed the following year. A historian of Smith's work calls the building "among Smith's master works of ecclesiastical architecture." The stained glass in the building was created by Willet Studios in Philadelphia, and Smith had designed one stained glass segment in honor of his wife, who had died in 1940. Briarcliff Plaza, one of Atlanta's first strip malls, later opened across from the church.
