= George Francis Willis =

American millionaire who made his fortunes with patent medicines

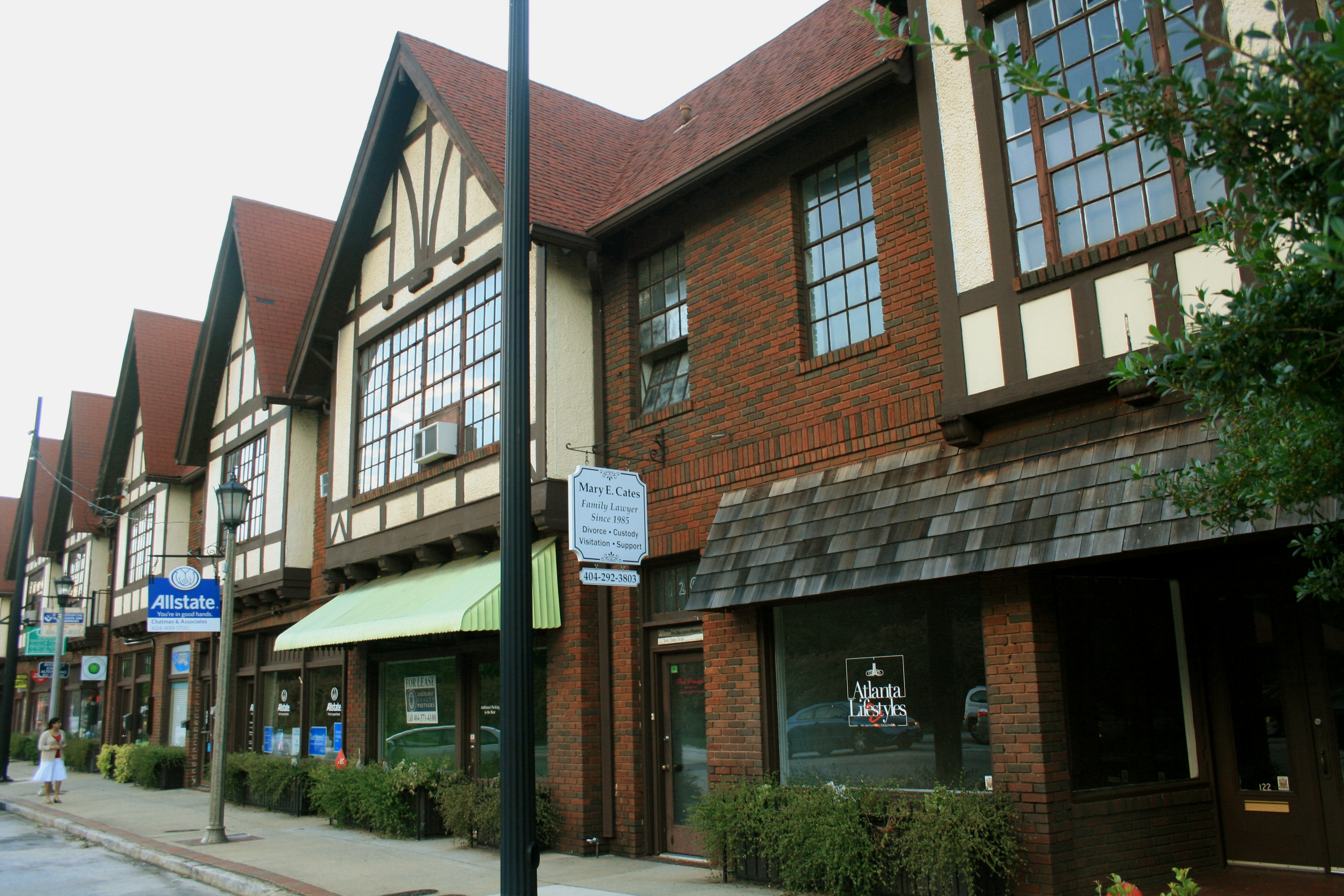
Tudor Revival architecture in downtown Avondale Estates

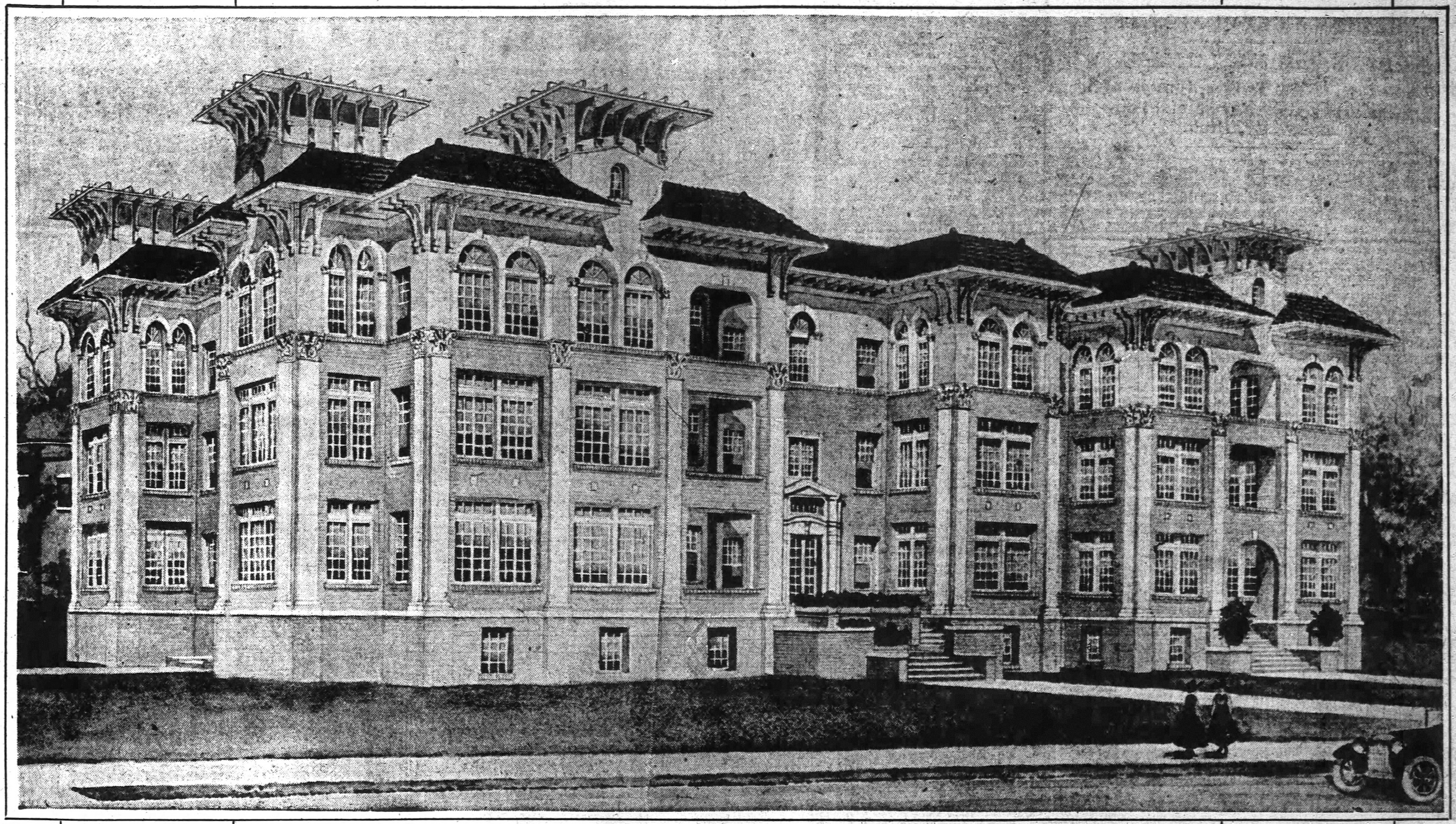
Willis' Druid Apartments (1917, demolished), which once stood in Atlanta's Poncey-Highland neighborhood

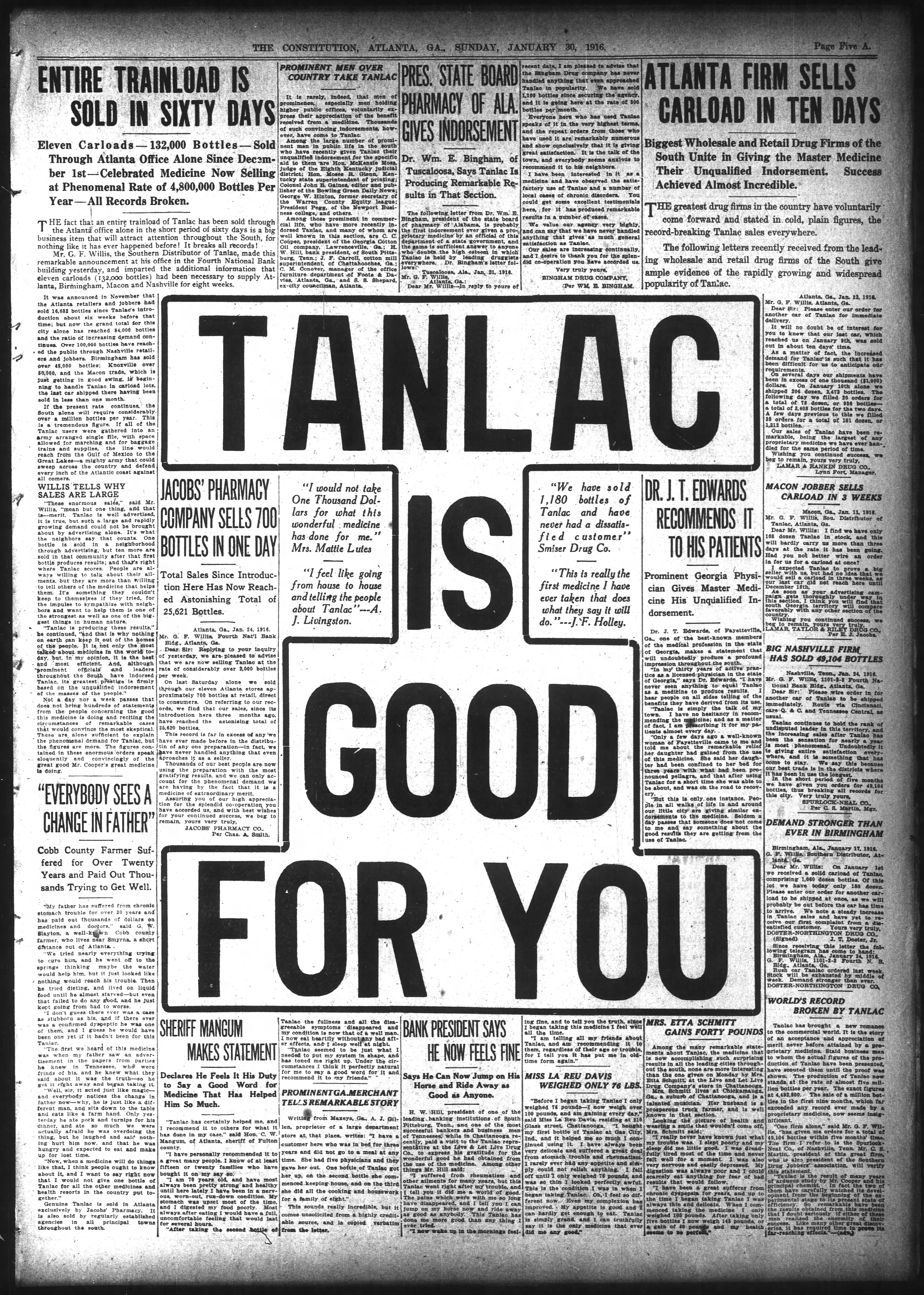
1916 ad for Tanlac

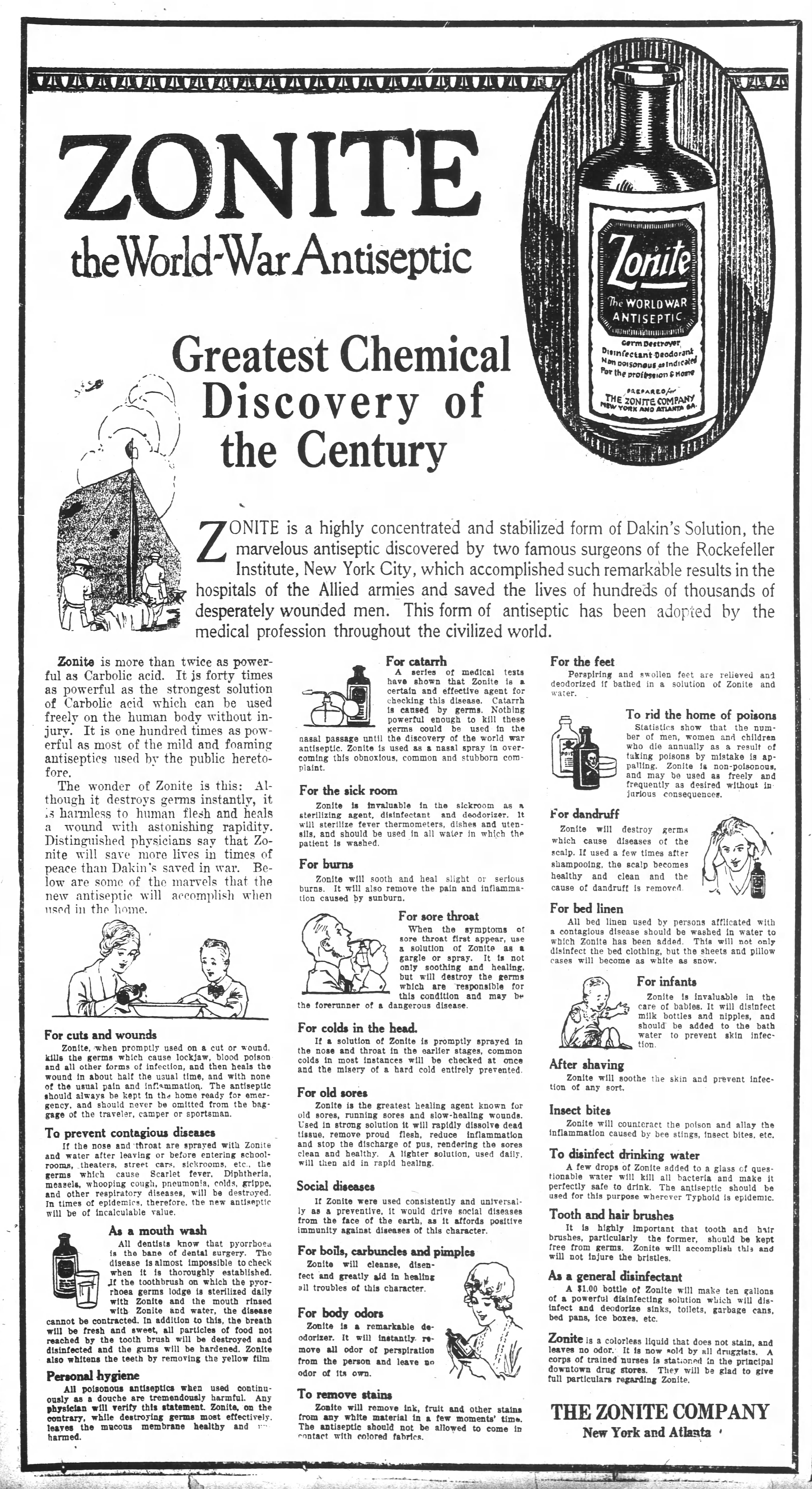
1920 ad for Zonite

George Francis Willis (1880, in Waynesville, North Carolina – July 20, 1932) was an American millionaire who made his fortunes with patent medicines.

== Biography ==
Willis attended Bingham Military School in Asheville, North Carolina, and later moved to Knoxville, Tennessee, where he became involved with a patent medicine firm. Willis began to sell and promote the medicines. In 1913 he founded International Proprietaries, Inc., and made a fortune selling a tonic called Tanlac. Although chemists at the time branded it quackery, as it was simply fortified wine with herbs and a laxative, the tonic sold very well nevertheless. Willis sold his firm in 1922 but then made another fortune with Zonite, an antiseptic preparation based on Dakin's solution, widely used in World War I.

In 1922, as head of its finance committee, Willis led a $2 million fundraising drive for Georgia Tech.

Willis was also active in real estate development in the Atlanta area. Willis commissioned the 1917 Druid Apartments at the corner of Ponce de Leon Avenue and Highland Avenue in Atlanta's Poncey-Highland neighborhood, now the site of the Briarcliff Plaza, Atlanta's first shopping center.

In 1924, he purchased the town of Ingleside, Georgia, just east of Decatur and there built the new planned community of Avondale Estates, Georgia. The distinctive Tudor Revival architecture of the town was inspired by a recent trip that he and his wife had taken to Stratford-upon-Avon, England. Willis sought input from internationally known city planners; Avondale Estates was the first documented planned city in the Southeastern United States.

In 1928 Willis introduced a new medicine, Sargon, and became president of the Stone Mountain Confederate Monumental Association.
