= Grace United Methodist Church (Atlanta) =

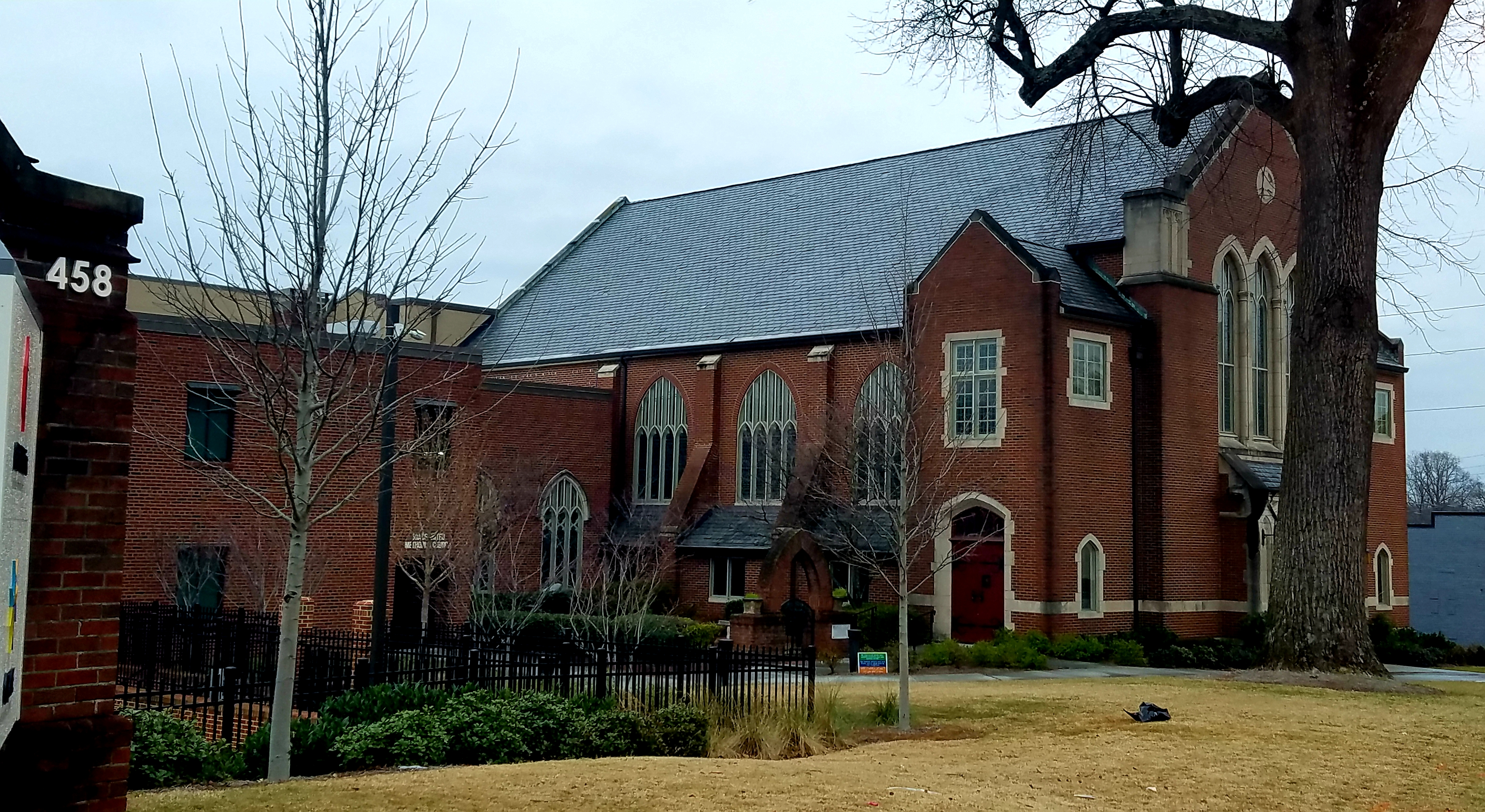
- Grace United Methodist Church (2020)

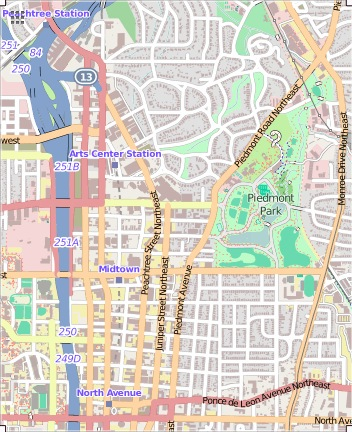
- Location within Atlanta Midtown Location within Atlanta Location within Georgia Location within the United States
- 33°46′25″N 84°22′19″W
- Location: 458 Ponce de Leon Avenue; Atlanta, Georgia, United States
- Denomination: United Methodist Church
- Website: graceonponce.org

History
- Founded: 1871

Architecture
- Architect: Francis Palmer Smith
- Architectural type: Gothic Revival
- Completed: 1923

Grace United Methodist Church is a Methodist church in Atlanta, Georgia, United States. Originally organized as a mission in 1871, the current church building was designed by Francis Palmer Smith and was completed in 1923.

== History ==
The church was founded in Atlanta in 1871 as St. John's Mission. The church adopted its current name 12 years later. The church, initially part of the Methodist Episcopal Church, South, changed locations several times in the first few decades of its existence. By 1883, it was located in a building at the intersection of Wheat Street (now Auburn Avenue) and Jackson Street. In 1906, the church moved to a building at the intersection of Boulevard and Highland Avenue. This building was destroyed in the Great Atlanta Fire of 1917, and shortly thereafter, the church used the insurance money from the destruction to purchase a property on Ponce de Leon Avenue. In 1918, the church built a Sunday school building on the property. Several years later, in 1922, architect Francis Palmer Smith was hired to design a new church building at the site. According to a historian of Smith's, this project would be the "first large ecclesiastical project of Smith's career". Smith designed this new church building in a Gothic Revival style, with the building trimmed with Indiana Limestone. Smith would go on to design several church buildings throughout Atlanta.

During the civil rights movement, the church was the site of an effort towards church desegregation when, on August 7, 1960, a small interracial group attended Sunday services at the church. This was part of a city-wide campaign towards church desegregation, as interracial groups attended services at other churches that day, including First Presbyterian Church and St. Mark Methodist Church.

During the early 21st century, financial difficulties lead to the possibility that the church would close or relocate. However, in 2016, it was announced that the General Board of Global Ministries, a branch of the United Methodist Church, would relocate from New York City to Atlanta, and in the process would purchase the property belonging to Grace, allowing them to stay and continue to hold services in the building. To make room for the new group, the church held an estate sale that year.

== Bibliography ==
- Craig, Robert Michael (2012). The Architecture of Francis Palmer Smith, Atlanta's Scholar-architect. University of Georgia Press. ISBN 978-0-8203-2898-0 – via Google Books.
- Garrett, Franklin M. (1969). Atlanta and Environs: A Chronicle of Its People and Events, 1880s-1930s. Vol. II. University of Georgia Press. ISBN 978-0-8203-3904-7 – via Google Books.
- Haynes, Stephen R. (2012). The Last Segregated Hour: The Memphis Kneel-Ins and the Campaign for Southern Church Desegregation. Oxford University Press. ISBN 978-0-19-991101-1 – via Google Books.
- Poole, Shelia (September 23, 2016). "Grace UMC holds huge estate sale to make space for new partner". The Atlanta Journal-Constitution. Cox Enterprises.
- Reed, Wallace Putnam, ed. (1889). History of Atlanta, Georgia: With Illustrations and Biographical Sketches of Some of Its Prominent Men and Pioneers. D. Mason & Company. ISBN 9780722208724 – via Google Books.
- Jones, Sharon Foster (2012). Atlanta's Ponce de Leon Avenue: A History. The History Press. ISBN 978-1-61423-468-5 – via Google Books.
