= Francis Palmer Smith =

American architect

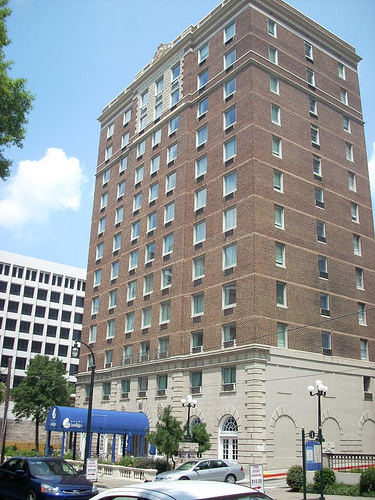
Cox-Carlton Hotel (1925)

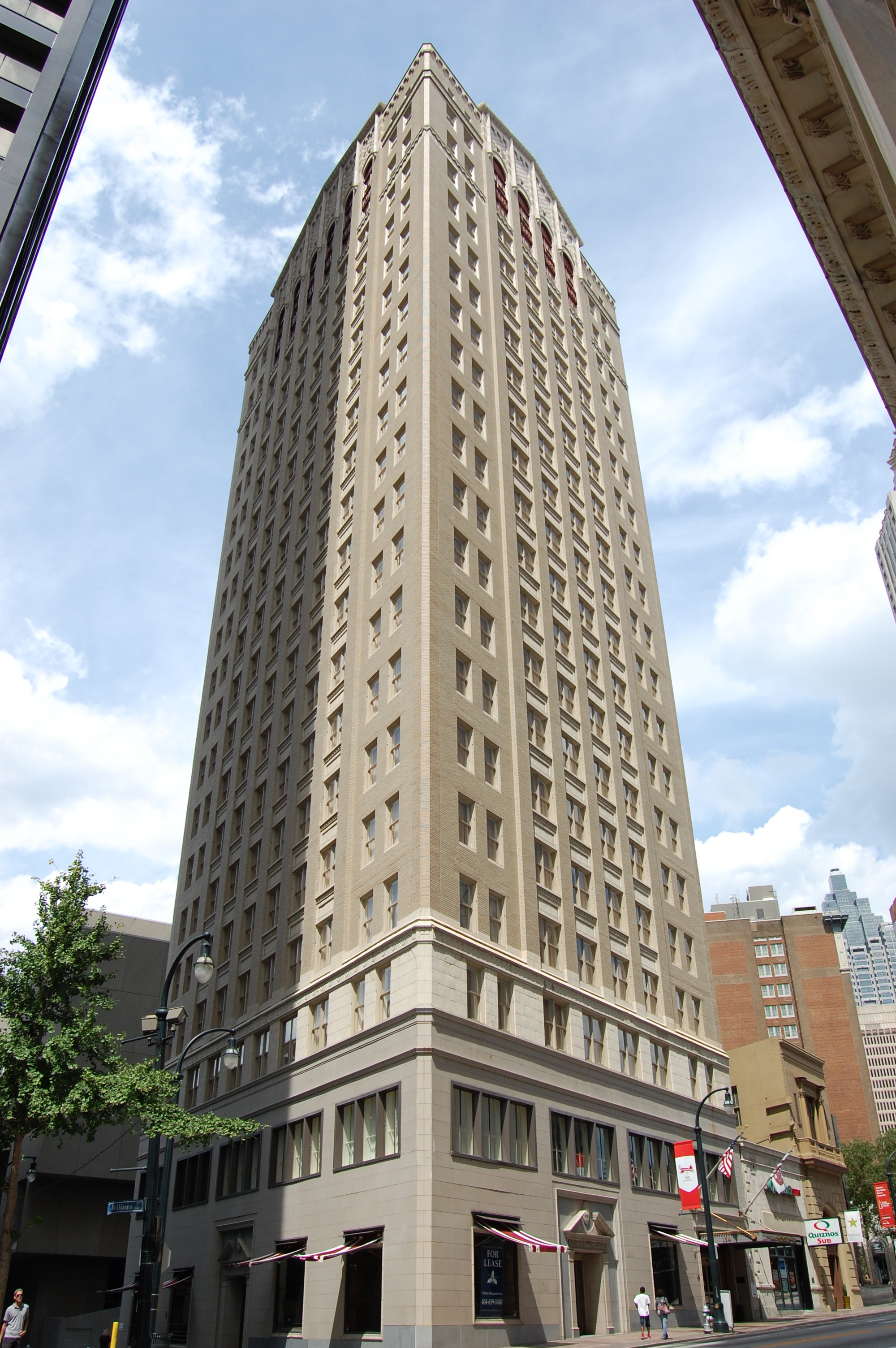
Rhodes-Haverty Building (1929)

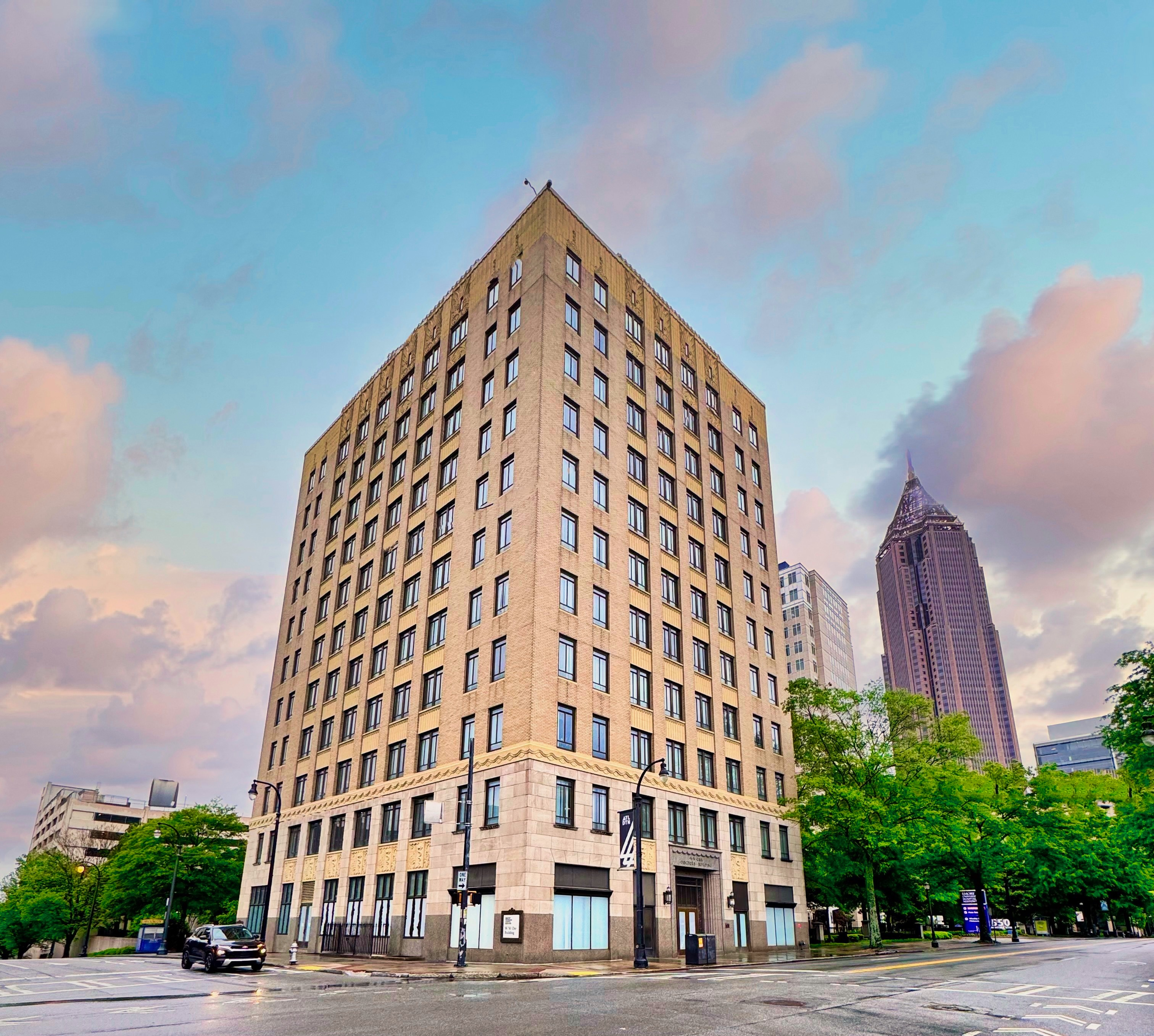
W. W. Orr Building (1930)

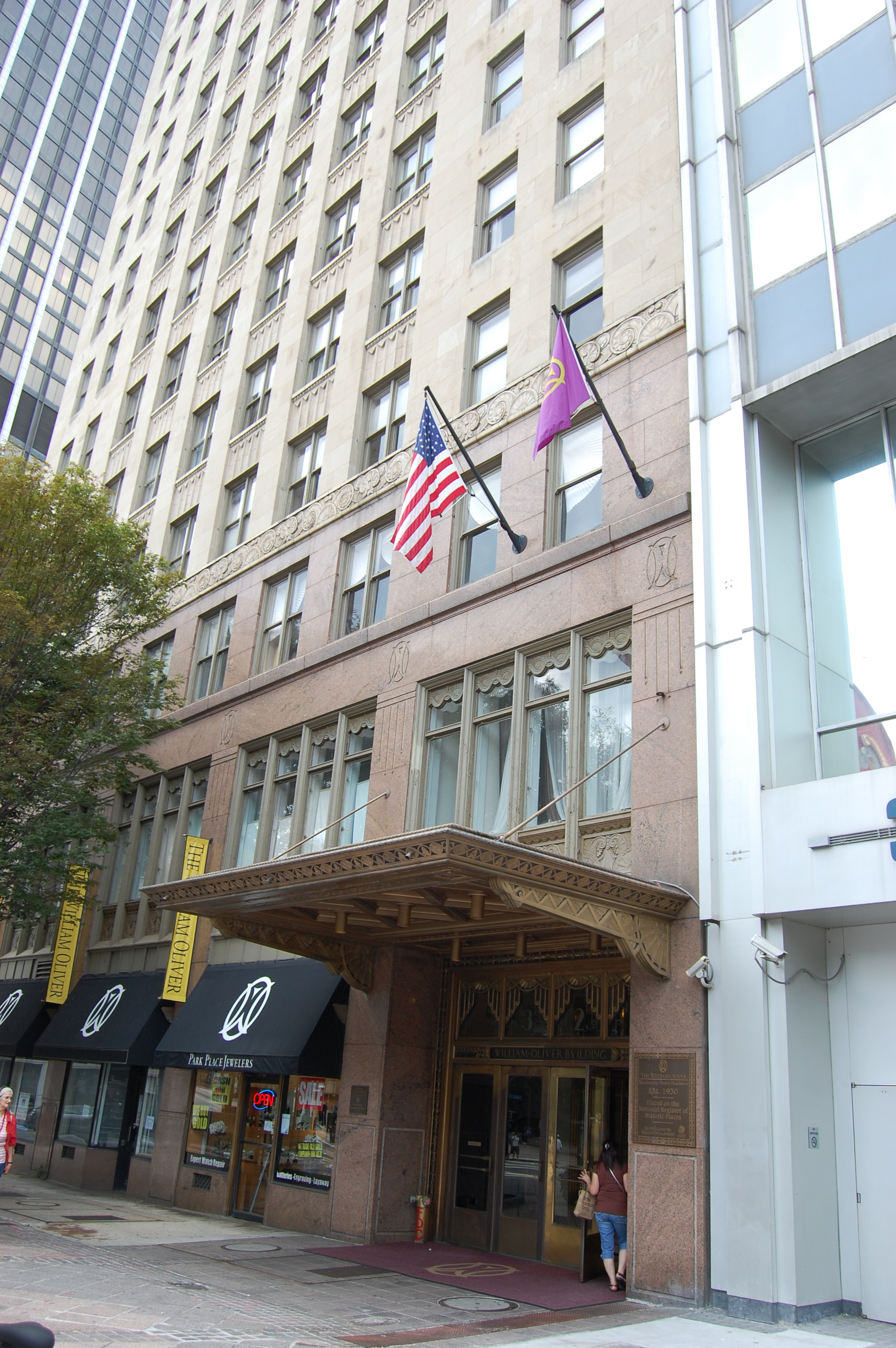
William-Oliver Building (1930)

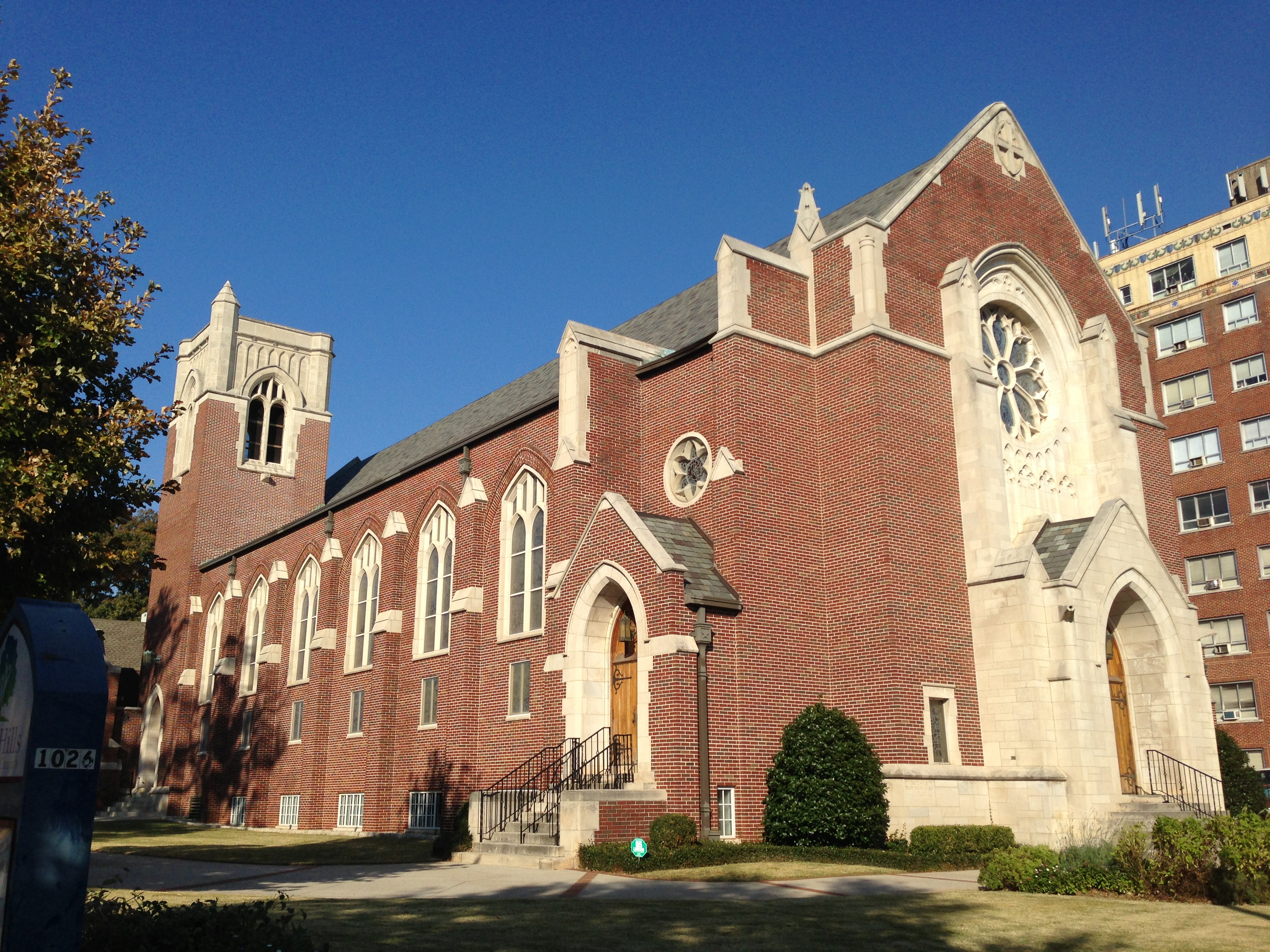
Druid Hills Presbyterian Church (1939–40), 458 Ponce de Leon Avenue NE, Virginia-Highland, Atlanta

Francis Palmer Smith (March 27, 1886, in Cincinnati, Ohio – March 5, 1971, in Atlanta, Georgia) was an architect active in Atlanta and elsewhere in the Southeastern United States. He was the director of the Georgia Tech College of Architecture from 1909–1922.

After working in Cincinnati, Ohio and then Columbus, Georgia, Smith was hired as a professor of Georgia Tech's new architecture school in 1908. He transferred the curriculum of the University of Pennsylvania which emphasized Beaux-Arts architecture. He met Robert Smith Pringle and formed a partnership with him in 1922, Pringle and Smith.

Robert Smith Pringle (1883-1937) was born in Summerville, South Carolina, and was educated in Columbia, South Carolina. He opened an office on his own in Columbia in 1902, and in 1917 moved to Atlanta, practicing on his own again until joining as a partner with Smith. Smith was the principal designer of the firm. Pringle died in 1937.

Francis Palmer Smith continued then in independent practice until 1960, when his son, Henry Howard Smith joined in partnership, and eventually retired in 1970. F. P. Smith died in Atlanta in 1971.

== Works ==
As part of Pringle and Smith:

- Numerous residences in the elite Buckhead and Druid Hills neighborhoods of Atlanta
- Grace United Methodist Church at 458 Ponce de Leon Avenue just west of Boulevard (1922–23)
- Cox-Carlton Hotel (1925)
- Norris Building (1926)
- Lynch Building (1926)
- Rhodes-Haverty Building (1929)
- William-Oliver Building (1930)
- W. W. Orr Building (1930)
- Standardized bottling plants for Coca-Cola throughout the southeastern U.S., including the 1937 Tifton Coca-Cola Bottling Plant at 820 Love Avenue in Tifton, Georgia, a two-story, brick, commercial Beaux Arts-style building in the Tifton Residential Historic District, an example of "Standardized Coca Cola Bottling Plant, Model 3A."

And other buildings in Miami, Jacksonville, and Sarasota, Florida.

Pringle and Smith developed plans for a grand 750-room hotel on the site of the Hotel Aragon at the southeast corner Peachtree and Ellis streets, but the more modest Collier Building (1932–1970s) was built on the site instead.

After Pringle and Smith was disbanded, Smith's further works included:

- Additional bottling plants in the Southeast
- Smaller houses in the Atlanta and Chattanooga suburbs
- Druid Hills Presbyterian Church in Virginia-Highland, Atlanta
- Episcopal Cathedral of Saint Philip on Peachtree Road at "Jesus Junction" in Buckhead (and all of its supporting structures).

== See also ==
- List of Coca-Cola buildings and structures
