= W. W. Orr Building =

Coordinates: 33.7677°N 84.3856°W

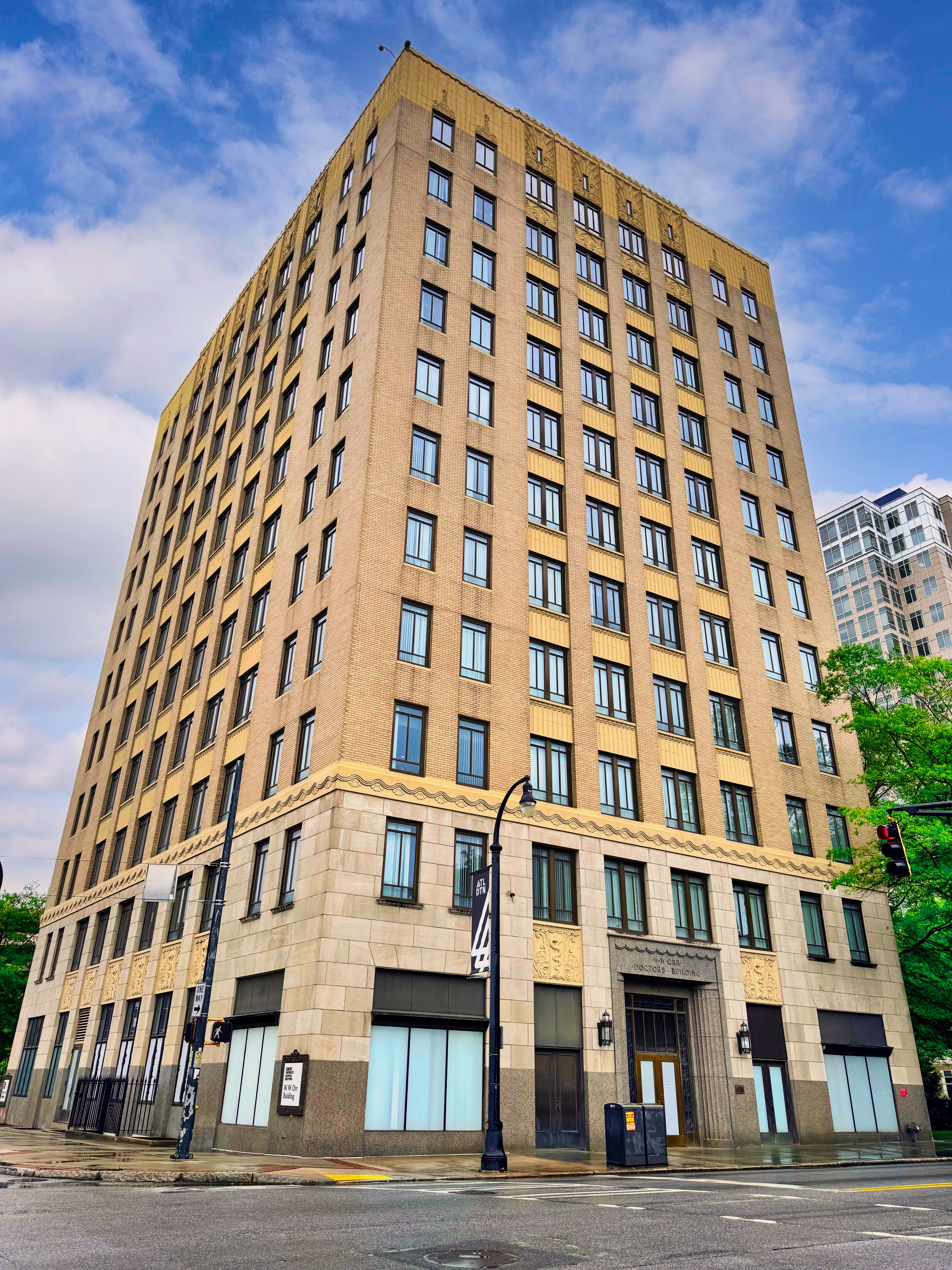

- Location in Atlanta Location in Georgia Location in United States
- Alternative names: W. W. Orr Medical Building; W. W. Orr Doctors' Building

General information
- Architectural style: Art Deco
- Location: 478 Peachtree Street NE Atlanta, Georgia 30308
- Completed: 1930

Technical details
- Floor count: 11

Atlanta Historic Site or District
- Designated: October 23, 1989

Design and construction
- Architect: Francis Palmer Smith
- Architecture firm: Pringle and Smith

The W. W. Orr Building (also known as W. W. Orr Medical Building and W. W. Orr Doctors' Building) is an 11-story landmark building at 478 Peachtree Street NE in SoNo, Atlanta.

== History ==
The Art Deco style building was designed by architect Francis Palmer Smith of the firm of Pringle and Smith. While the firm had designed many Beaux-Arts buildings in Atlanta, the Orr Building was one of the first two buildings designed by Pringle and Smith in the Art Deco style (alongside the William–Oliver Building, finished the same year). The building's namesake, W. W. (Wayman W.) Orr, was the president of the Atlanta Retail Merchants' Association for several years in the 1910s. It is currently part of the Emory University Hospital Midtown complex. The building is decorated with serpents and staffs, alluding to its function as a medical building (as which it still functions).

When opened in 1930, it was notable for its location so far from the city center and marked the beginning of the northern section of Peachtree Street as an automobile-oriented boulevard. It was the city's second building built specifically for medical offices, after the Medical Arts Building. The site had been occupied in the 1890s by a residence, that of J. Bulow Campbell, and thereafter by another building.

In 1989, the city of Atlanta designated the building a landmark building.
