= Murder Kroger =

Supermarket in Atlanta, Georgia, U.S.

Coordinates: 33.7717°N 84.3635°W

Murder Kroger is the nickname of a Kroger supermarket in Atlanta, Georgia, United States. It has been the scene of two fatal shootings, a fatal stabbing, and the discovery of a corpse. It is located at 725 Ponce de Leon Avenue in Poncey–Highland and has been known as "Murder Kroger" for decades. In 1991, a 25-year-old woman named Cynthia Prioleau was shot and killed. In 2002, the malodorous corpse of a man was found inside a car. In 2015, an Alabama man, Joshua R. Richey, was shot and killed. The 2015 murder occurred after the store had been renovated and promoted by the company as "Beltline Kroger".

Even though the original store was demolished in 2016 and an entirely new store within a larger mixed-use development called 725 Ponce opened in 2019, "Murder Kroger" continued to be described as a nickname "that just won't die".

== History ==
Prior to its construction, the store was originally occupied by land owned by Ford Factory Square. The land was bought in the 1980s for $900,000. The store opened on July 2, 1986. From the 1990s, and until at least 2002, the store had drivers license renewal services. After two Publix supermarkets opened nearby, the store was refurbished around 2002.

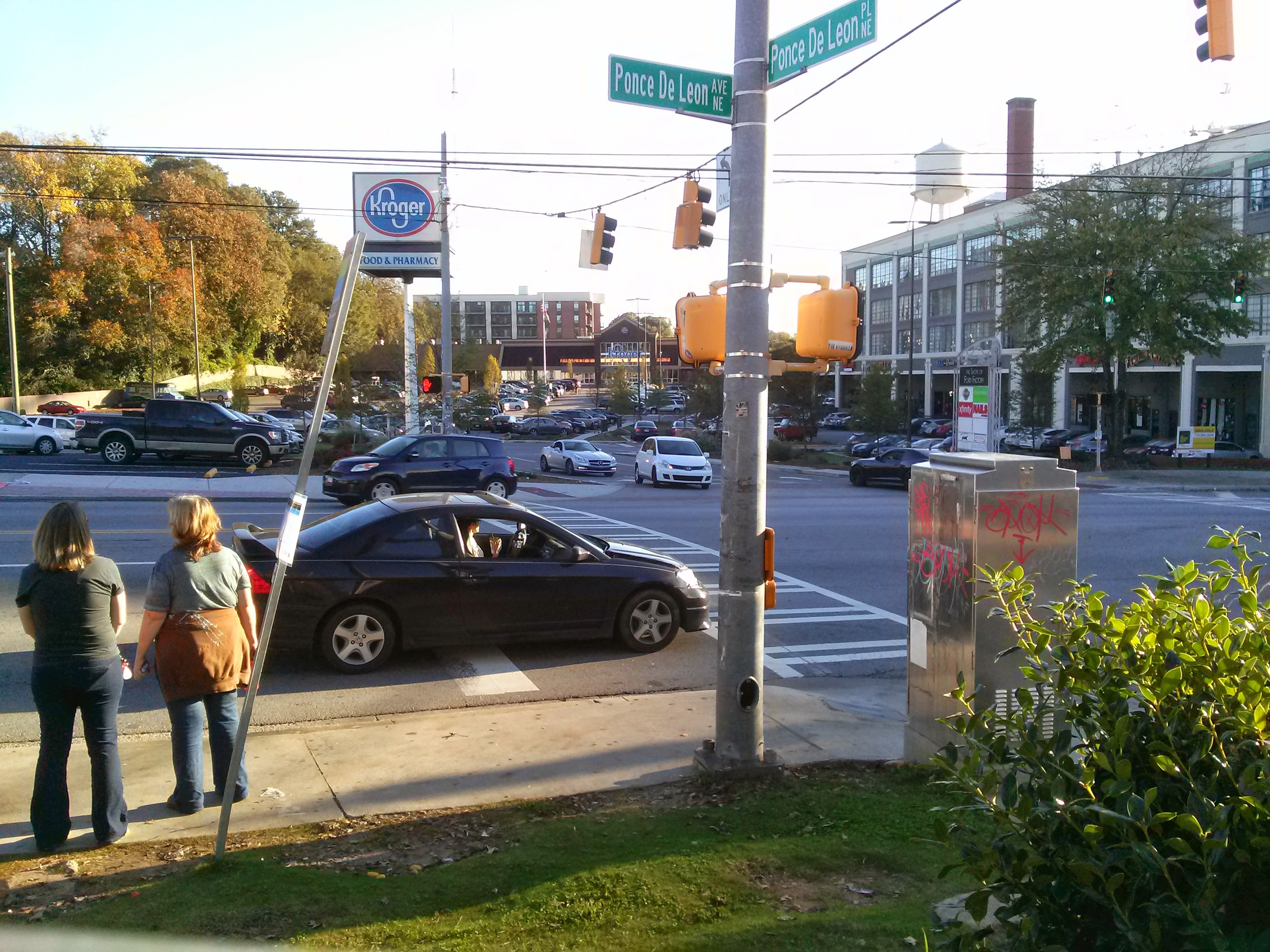
Murder Kroger as seen from across Ponce de Leon Ave., with the Ford Factory lofts on the right

In January 1990, a bomb-like device was found inside the store. It did not go off. In October 1999, a man robbed the Bank of America inside the store. A song titled "Murder Kroger" by the group Attractive Eighties Women, which incorporates a mention of the nearby Clermont Lounge into the lyrics, is dedicated to shoppers who frequent the store. Renovations were scheduled for completion in November 2014 at the market, including a bike/pedestrian ramp to the Atlanta BeltLine's Eastside Trail, a bike repair station, new curbs and sidewalks (including paved sidewalk access to Ponce de Leon Avenue), new trees and landscaping, a "water quality pond" in the parking lot to filter runoff, new LED parking lot lighting and repaving the front and back parking lots.

=== Murders and victims ===
In 1991, a 25-year-old woman, Cynthia Prioleau, was fatally shot in the parking lot. The Atlanta Journal-Constitution attributed the nickname "Scary Kroger" to the store because of the event. The murder was unsolved as of 2019.

In August 2002, a strong odor raised the suspicions of a woman who reported her findings to police: a dead man was in a car in the parking lot. In 2012, a 20-year-old male junior at Georgia State University, Lee Lowery, was murdered just inside the Ford Factory Lofts, an apartment building which shares a parking lot with Murder Kroger. On March 10, 2015, Joshua R. Richey, a father of four from Alabama who was working on a construction project, was fatally shot in the chest in the parking lot beside the Kroger building. On August 23, 2026, a man was stabbed outside the building and later died of his injuries.

=== Demolition and new store ===
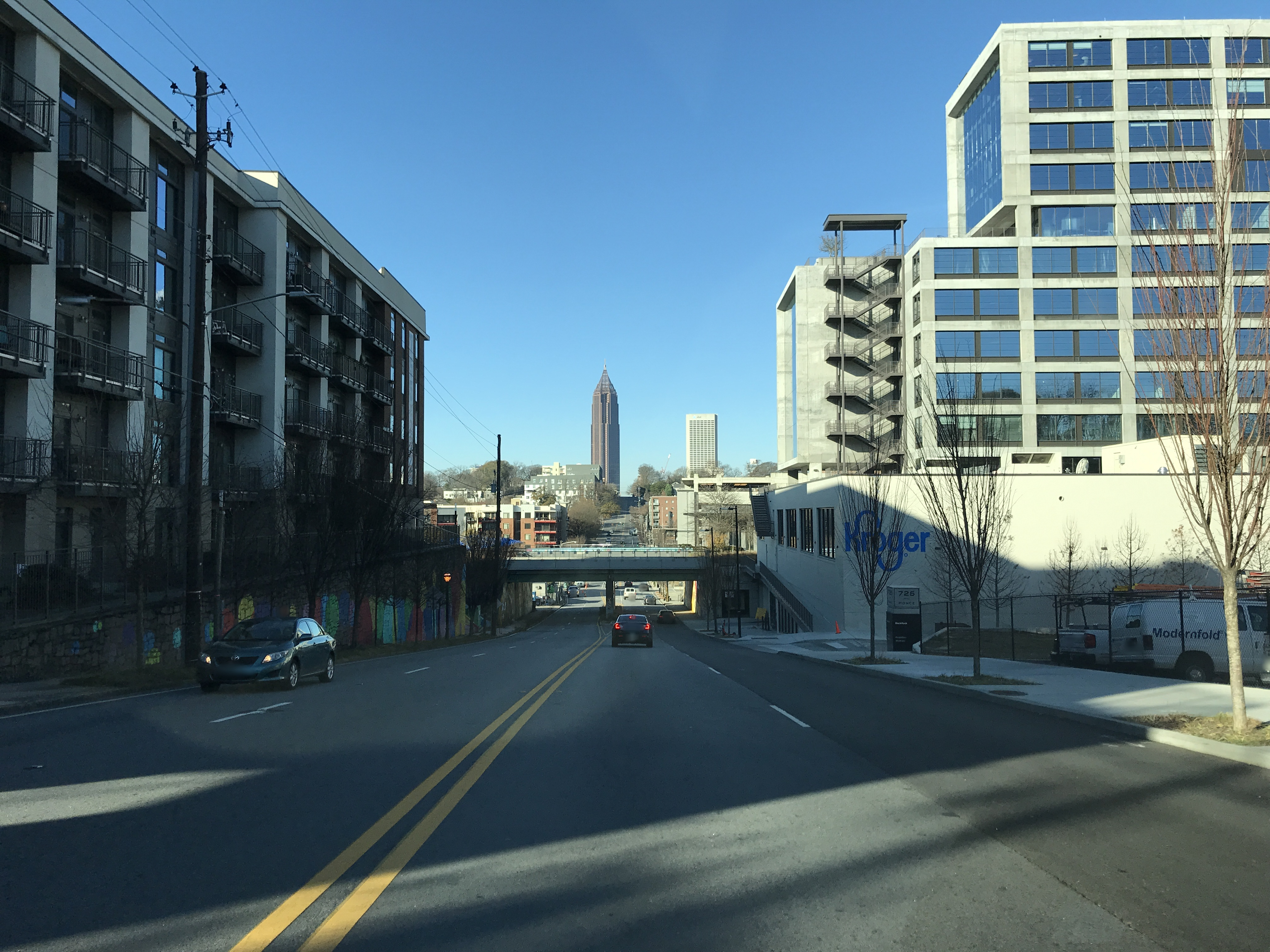
The new store as seen from North Ave NE

On January 15, 2016, Kroger announced that the location would be demolished to make way for 725 Ponce, a mixed-use development incorporating office space, a new Kroger store, and expanded parking. The original Kroger building was demolished shortly after it was closed on October 28, 2016.

Kroger opened a new store on October 16, 2019, at the same location, as part of the 725 Ponce development. Despite hopes from Kroger officials that the nickname "Murder Kroger" will not be applied to the new store, the name has already been adopted to refer to the new structure as well. A headline from 11 Alive called it a former nickname while a headline from The Atlanta Journal-Constitution asked "'Murder Kroger' no more?". Decaturish, meanwhile, stated that "locals have a name for [the store] that just won't die". Attempts to re-brand the location as "Beltline Kroger" proved unsuccessful, with the nickname instead being ascribed to another Kroger located several miles away, also on the Beltline.

In August 2026, a 29-year-old man was stabbed to death near the property of the new Kroger store.

== See also ==
- Rideau Street McDonald's
