= 725 Ponce =

725 Ponce is a 190-million-dollar mixed-use development under construction at 725 Ponce de Leon Avenue along the Atlanta Beltline in the Poncey-Highland neighborhood of Atlanta, Georgia. It includes a 360,000-square-foot, 12 story office tower atop a new Kroger supermarket replacing the Kroger (nicknamed "Murder Kroger") store demolished in 2016, which will connect to the BeltLine trail via a set of "M.C. Escher-esque steps", restaurants and a covered outside patio.
