= Tara Theatre =

Art house movie theater in Atlanta, Georgia, US

Coordinates: 33.818788°N 84.351354°W

- Loew's Tara
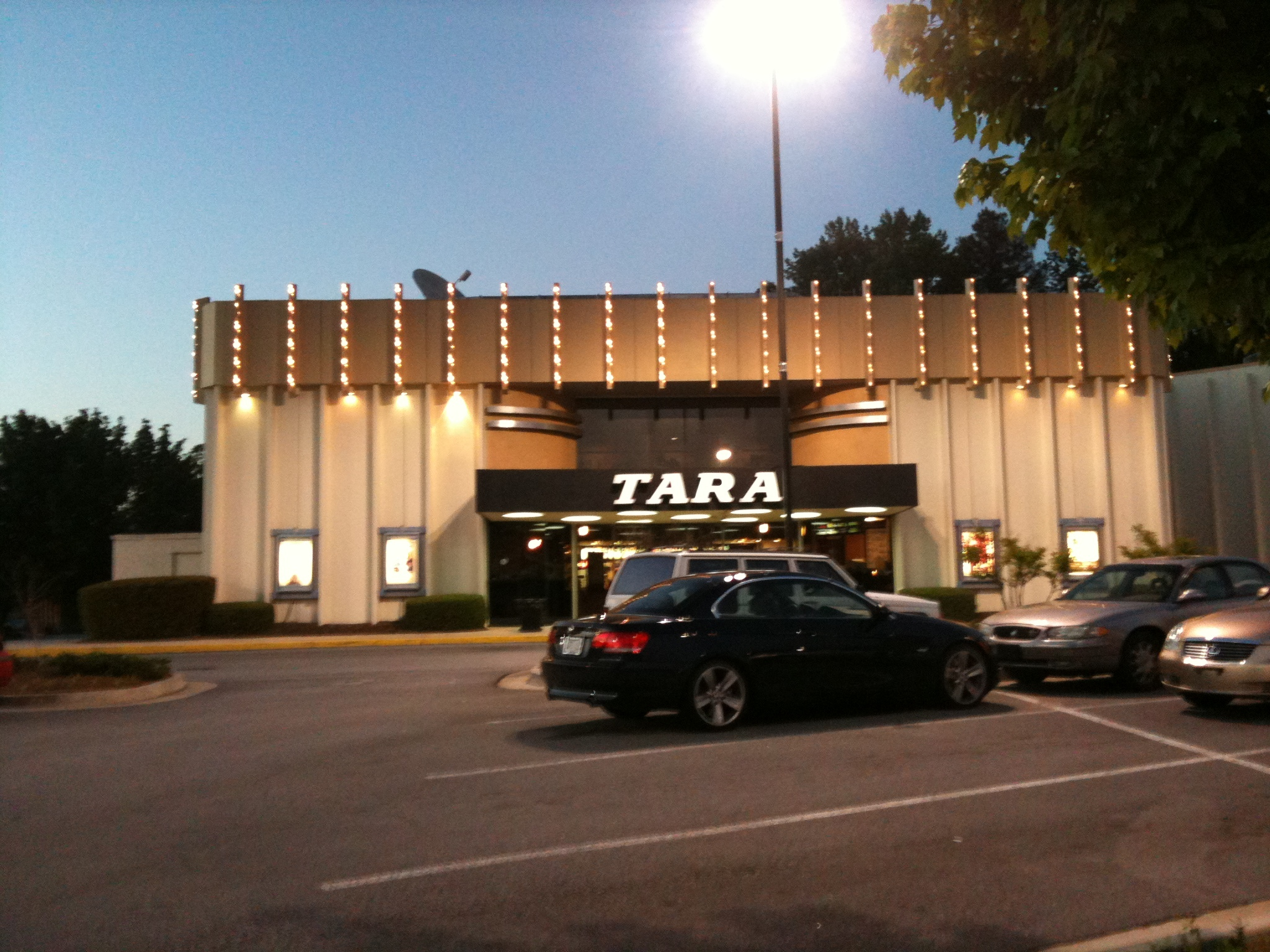
- Interactive map of Tara Theatre
- Address: 2345 Cheshire Bridge Road NE; Atlanta, Georgia
- Operator: Plaza Theatre (Atlanta)
- Type: Art house Independent film

Construction
- Opened: 1968
- Reopened: 2023

Website
- https://www.taraatlanta.com/

The Tara Theatre is an art house movie theater located in Atlanta. The theater specializes in the showing of independent films, the only theater in Atlanta to do so exclusively. Under the current ownership the Tara has become part of the Atlanta Film Festival.

== History ==
The Tara Theatre was opened in June 1968 by Loew's Theatres. It embodied the modernist architecture popular at the time. Originally called Loew's Tara, the theater's name memorialized the fictional Tara plantation, home of the O'Hara family in Margaret Mitchell's novel Gone with the Wind. Tara opened with a 70mm, stereophonic presentation of the film Gone with the Wind on its 60-foot screen. This single screen with seating for 1,000 was later divided into a twin theatre. In the 1970s a third theater was added onto the building, and in the early 1980s one of the twin theaters was itself divided. The theater became part of the local Lefont theater group in the 1980s. At the end of that decade, United Artists Theaters bought the Tara and used part of the building as a regional corporate office until United Artists, along with Edwards Theatres, was merged into the new parent company Regal Entertainment Group in 2002, but was still operated under the United Artists label for a time. Shortly afterward, the Tara was remodeled to feature silver, streamline moderne-inspired details in the interior and above the portico, faux art deco advertisements, and large hanging portraits of classical Hollywood movie stars, such as Greta Garbo, Humphrey Bogart, Ingrid Bergman, and Charlie Chaplin.

The Tara was closed by Regal in November 2022. It was re-opened in May 2023 under local ownership that also owns the nearby historic Plaza Theatre.
