= George Lefont =

American businessman (1938–2023)

George Lefont (1938 – 5 September 2023) was an American movie theater industry businessman from Berkeley, California. He owned Lefont Sandy Springs, a movie theater in Sandy Springs, Georgia that is the most common venue for the Atlanta Jewish Film Festival. His previous endeavours include the Silver Screen, a theater in Buckhead he founded in 1976, and the Coach and Six Restaurant in Atlanta, which he owned prior to selling it in 1994. He also purchased the Plaza Theatre in 1983, after which he converted its balcony into a second theatre with 200 seats. His repertoire of theaters in Metropolitan Atlanta have included The Screening Room on Piedmont Rd., Ansley Cinema on Monroe Dr., Tara on Cheshire Bridge Road, Toco Hills on Clairmont Rd., Garden Hills Cinema on Peachtree Rd., The Marietta Star probably on Roswell Rd at I-75 in the Town & Country Shopping Center, and a fourplex in Athens. Lefont died on 5 September 2023, at the age of 85.
