= William–Oliver Building =

Coordinates: 33.7547°N 84.3899°W

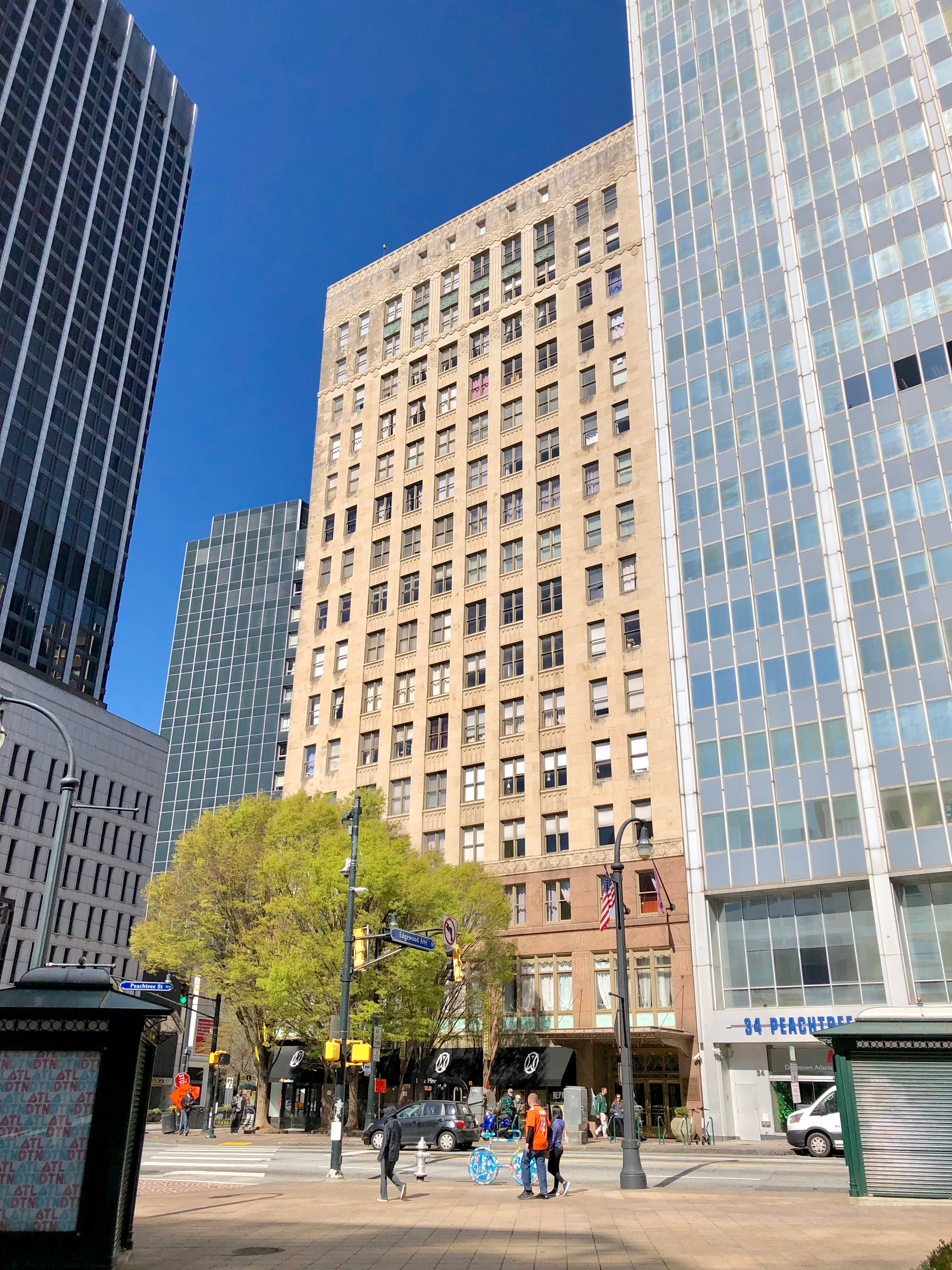
- William–Oliver Building in 2019

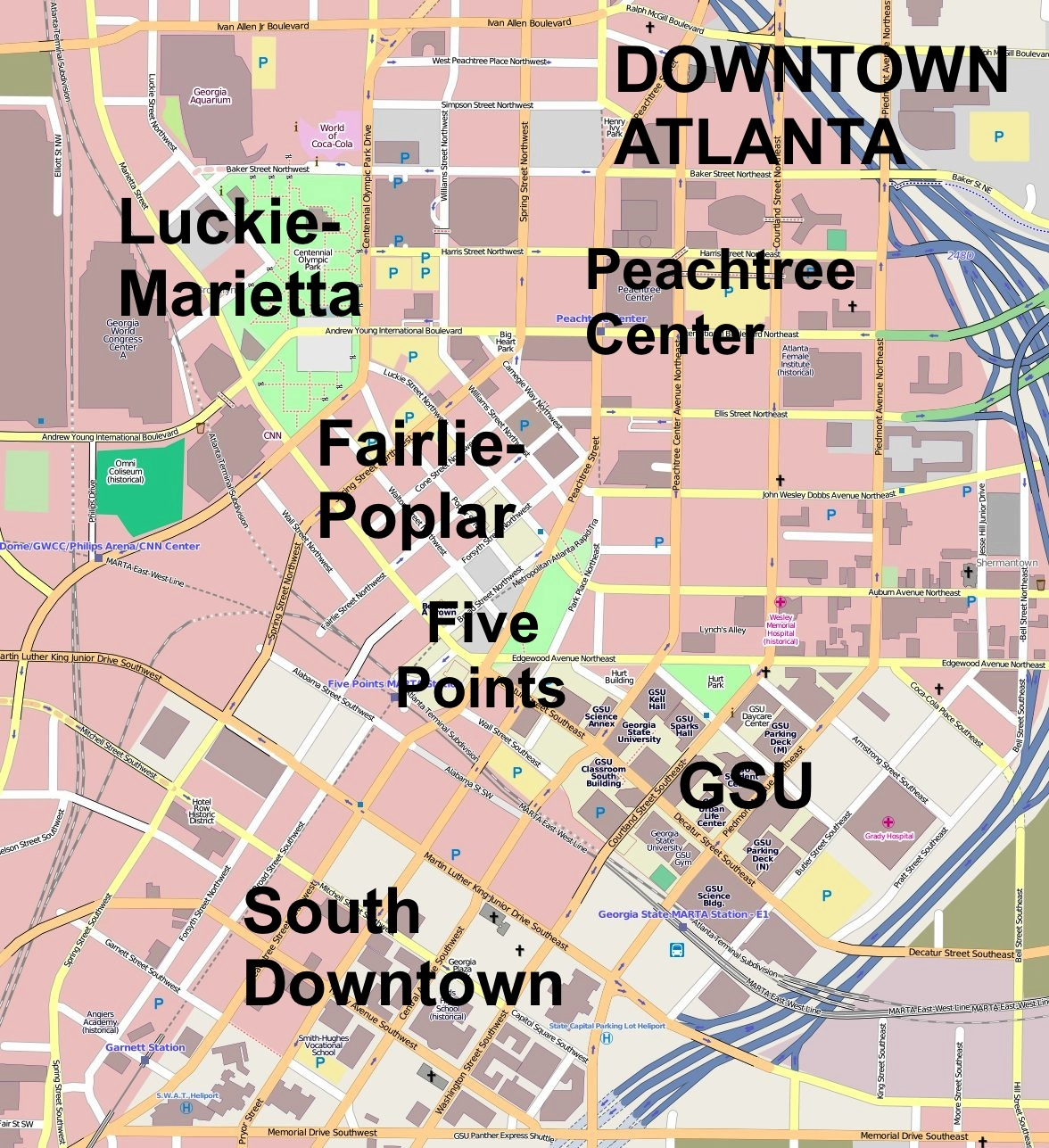
- Location within Downtown Atlanta William–Oliver Building (Atlanta) William–Oliver Building (Georgia) William–Oliver Building (the United States)

General information
- Architectural style: Art Deco
- Location: 32 Peachtree Street NW; Atlanta, Georgia
- Completed: 1930

Design and construction
- Architects: Francis Palmer Smith; Pringle and Smith

The William–Oliver Building is a 1930 Art Deco landmark building at 32 Peachtree Street NW at Five Points, Downtown Atlanta. It currently consists of 115 apartments. Its architect was Francis Palmer Smith of Pringle and Smith and was Atlanta's first completed Art Deco skyscraper. It was named after developer Thomas G. Healey's grandsons William and Oliver.
