= Plaza Theatre (Atlanta) =

Movie theatre in Atlanta, Georgia, USA

Coordinates: 33.7735°N 84.3530°W

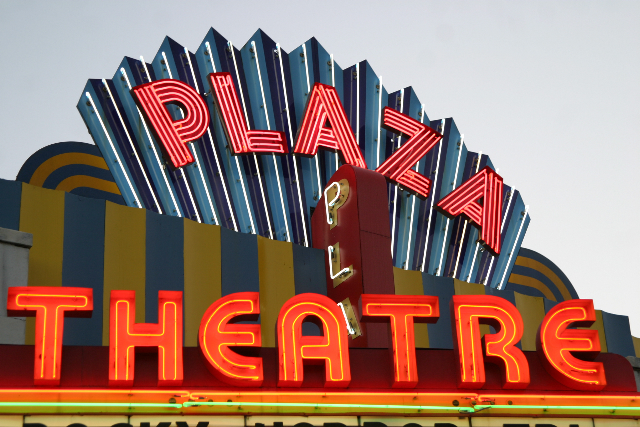
- Interactive map of Plaza Theatre
- Address: 1049 Ponce De Leon Avenue; Atlanta

Construction
- Opened: 1939
- Architect: George Harwell Bond

The Plaza Theatre is a movie theatre located in Atlanta, Georgia. Opened in 1939, it is Atlanta's longest continuously operating independent movie theatre and a city landmark.

== History ==
=== 1939 - 2006 ===
Designed by architect George Harwell Bond, the Plaza Theatre opened on December 23, 1939, as an art deco cinema and live theatre space. It was the neighbourhood cinema for the Druid Hills, Virginia Highland, and Poncey-Highland neighbourhoods of Atlanta. It is an anchor of the Briarcliff Plaza on Ponce de Leon Avenue, Atlanta's first shopping centre with off-street parking. The first film screened was the Joan Crawford-Norma Shearer vehicle The Women.

Several "big films" had second runs at the Plaza Theatre after having played their roadshow release downtown. Among them were Around the World in 80 Days (1956) and King of Kings (1961).

In the 1970s, the Plaza became an X-rated adult cinema and live burlesque theatre, screening such risqué fare as Teeny Buns and Swinging Sorority and live shows that on occasion featured Chesty Morgan, until the entire shopping center was renovated by owner at the time, Robert Griffith.

In 1983, movie theatre entrepreneur George LeFont bought the theatre and renovated the 1000-seat space by converting the balcony area into a second auditorium. The LeFont era witnessed an influx of independent, foreign, and art-house movies that would become the norm from 1983 to the present. The 1990s and 2000s witnessed a financial struggle for the Plaza, and the theatre was put up for sale in 2006.

=== 2006 - present ===
In late 2006, Atlanta natives Jonathan and Gayle Rej purchased the theatre, and in early 2010, The Plaza Theatre Foundation became a non-profit organisation. Retaining the original marquee and many of the original furnishings, the Plaza Theatre became the longest continuously operating theatre in Atlanta.

Since 2000, the fan group LDOD has hosted Atlanta's contribution to The Rocky Horror Picture Show cult following, screening the film at midnight every Friday, with pre-show activities and a "shadow cast" live performance and audience participation simultaneous with the movie.

In the 2000s, the Silver Scream Spookshow was hosted at The Plaza by Atlanta horror personality "Professor Morte". The show paired live comic and burlesque performances with screenings of classic science fiction movies, including Creature from the Black Lagoon, Frankenstein, and many films in the Godzilla franchise. Similarly, Splatter Cinema has brought re-creations of grisly movie scenes to the Plaza's lobby, paired with screenings of classic horror films such as Herschell Gordon Lewis's Blood Feast and Two Thousand Maniacs!, as well as movies in the Friday the 13th and A Nightmare on Elm Street series. Also during the 2000s, The Plaza screened many other classic films, including Easy Rider, Back to the Future, Five Easy Pieces, as well as showcases of local independent films.

In 2010, the Plaza celebrated its 70th anniversary with screenings of 1939 films, including The Wizard of Oz and Mr. Smith Goes to Washington; Robert Osborne of Turner Classic Movies co-hosted the event. The Plaza also hosted the Atlanta premiere for the film Scott Pilgrim vs. the World; Scott Pilgrim stars Michael Cera and Jason Schwartzman and director Edgar Wright were present at the premiere. Similarly, the director of the emerging cult film The Room (2003), Tommy Wiseau, made guest appearances at the theatre in 2010 and 2012.

In early 2013, the Plaza Theatre was sold to theatre enthusiast Michael Furlinger, underwent long overdue upgrades including digital projection, new seats, and other treatments as well as began screening mainstream films such as the Angry Birds and The Smurfs movies.

In early 2017, Asana Partners purchased the Briarcliff Plaza (where the Plaza Theatre is located) from the Griffith family for $18 million. The sale came as a surprise to the community as the property was not listed for sale.

In late 2017, the theatre was sold to Christopher Escobar, also the Executive Director of the Atlanta Film Society, and has been returning to its former appearance, showcases, performances, and independent and international films.

== See also ==
- Tara Theatre
