= Highland Avenue (Atlanta) =

Neighborhood of Atlanta, Georgia

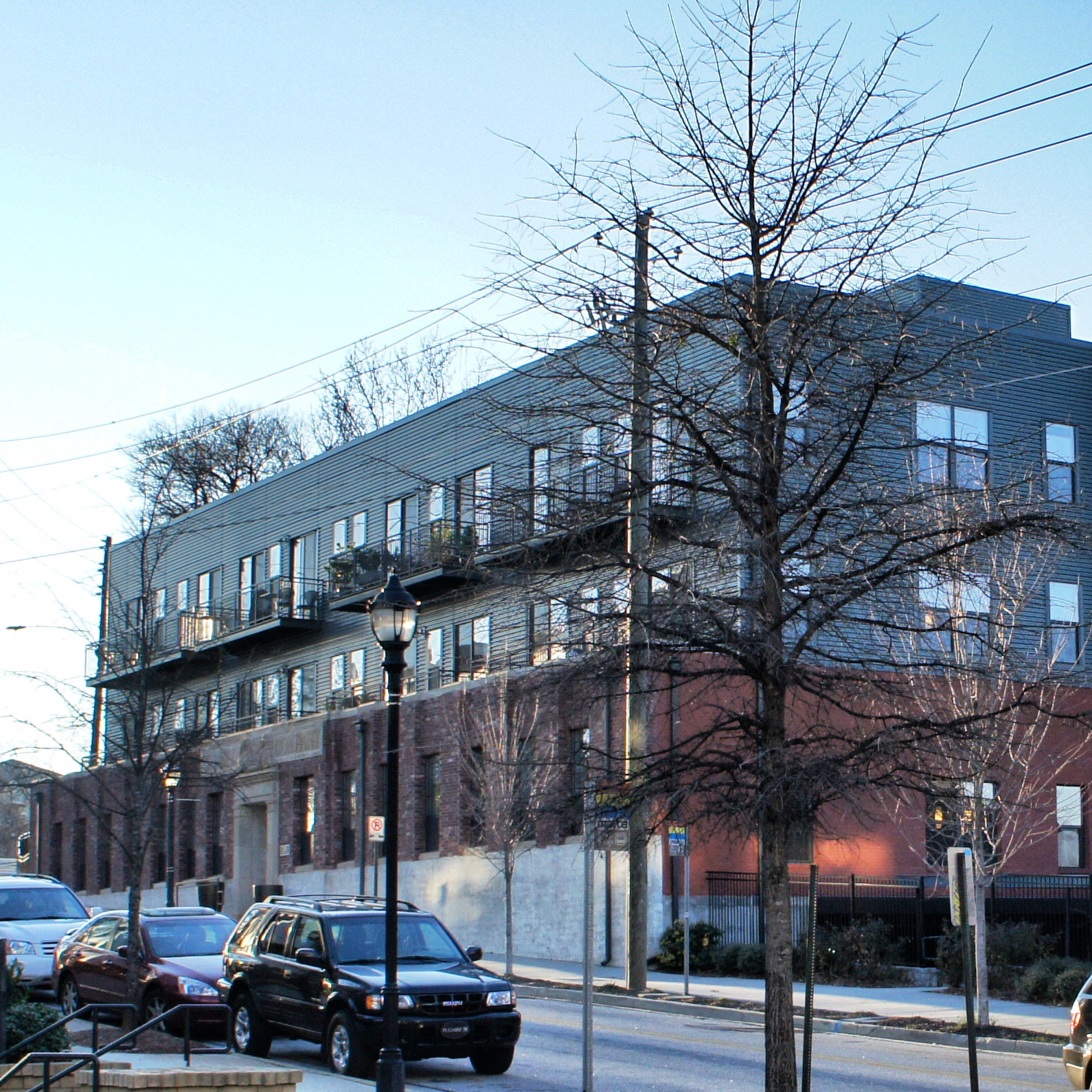
Streetscape in Inman Park

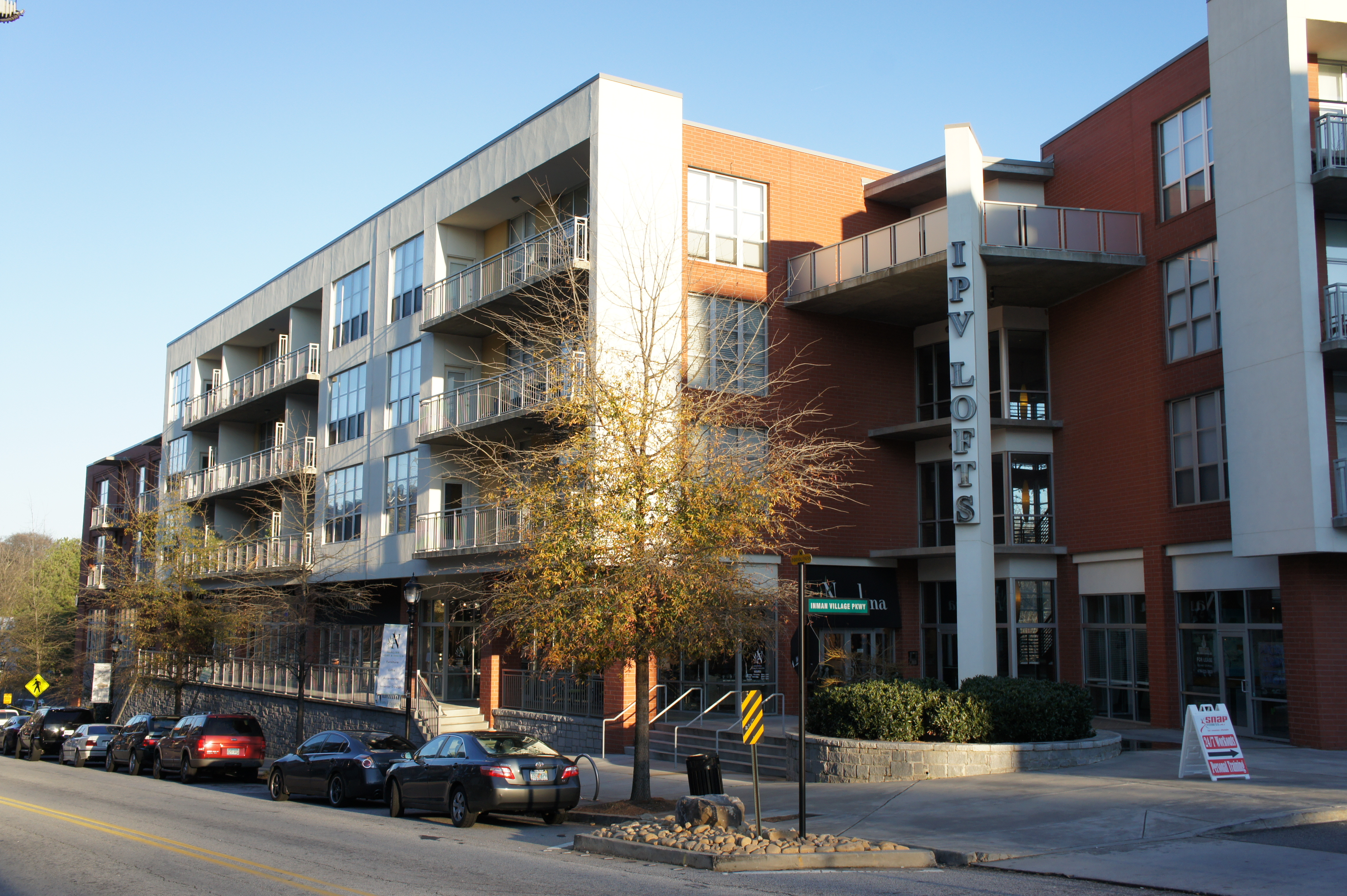
Streetscape in Inman Park

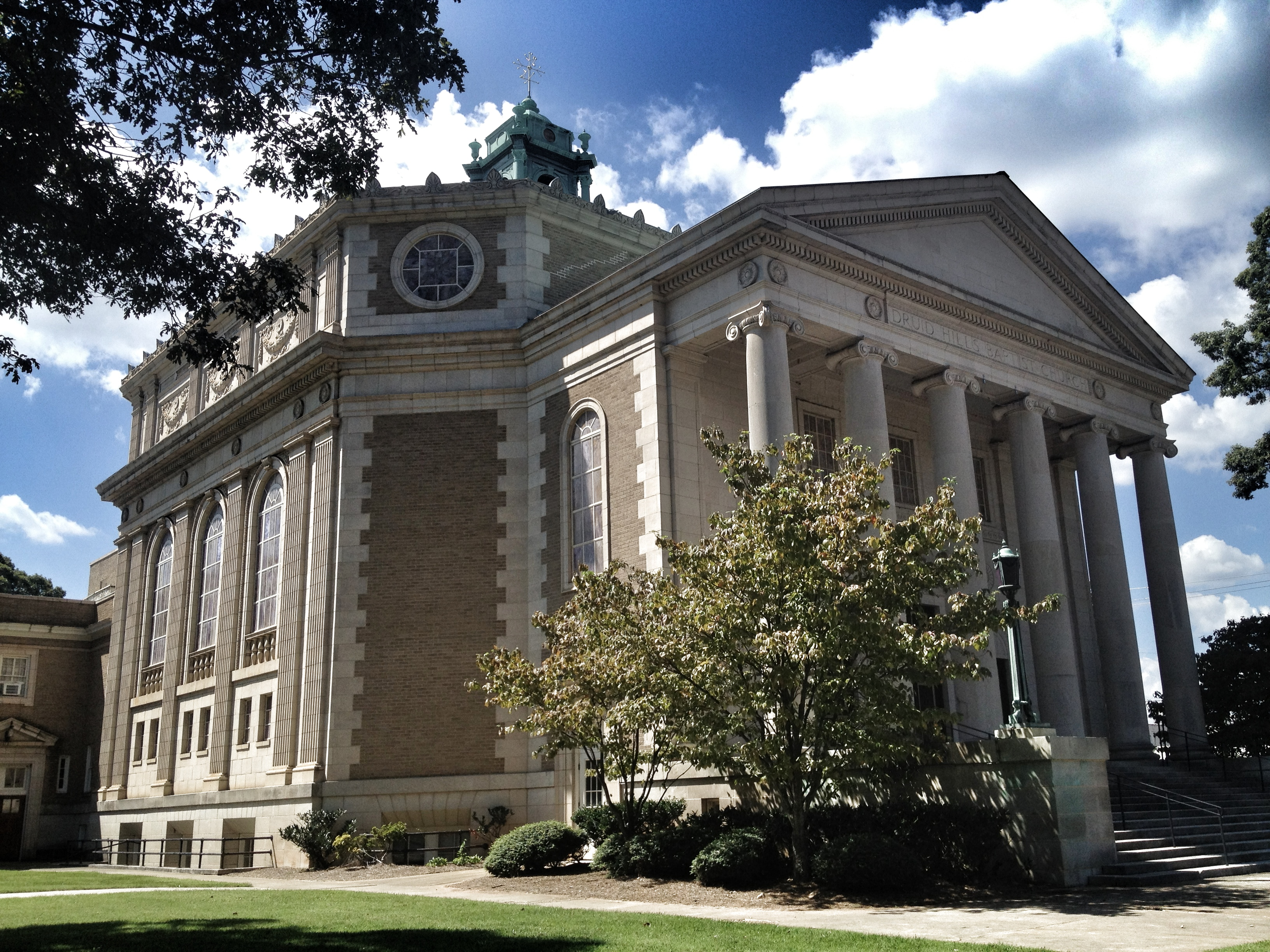
Druid Hills Baptist Church at the southeast corner of North Highland and Ponce de Leon Avenue

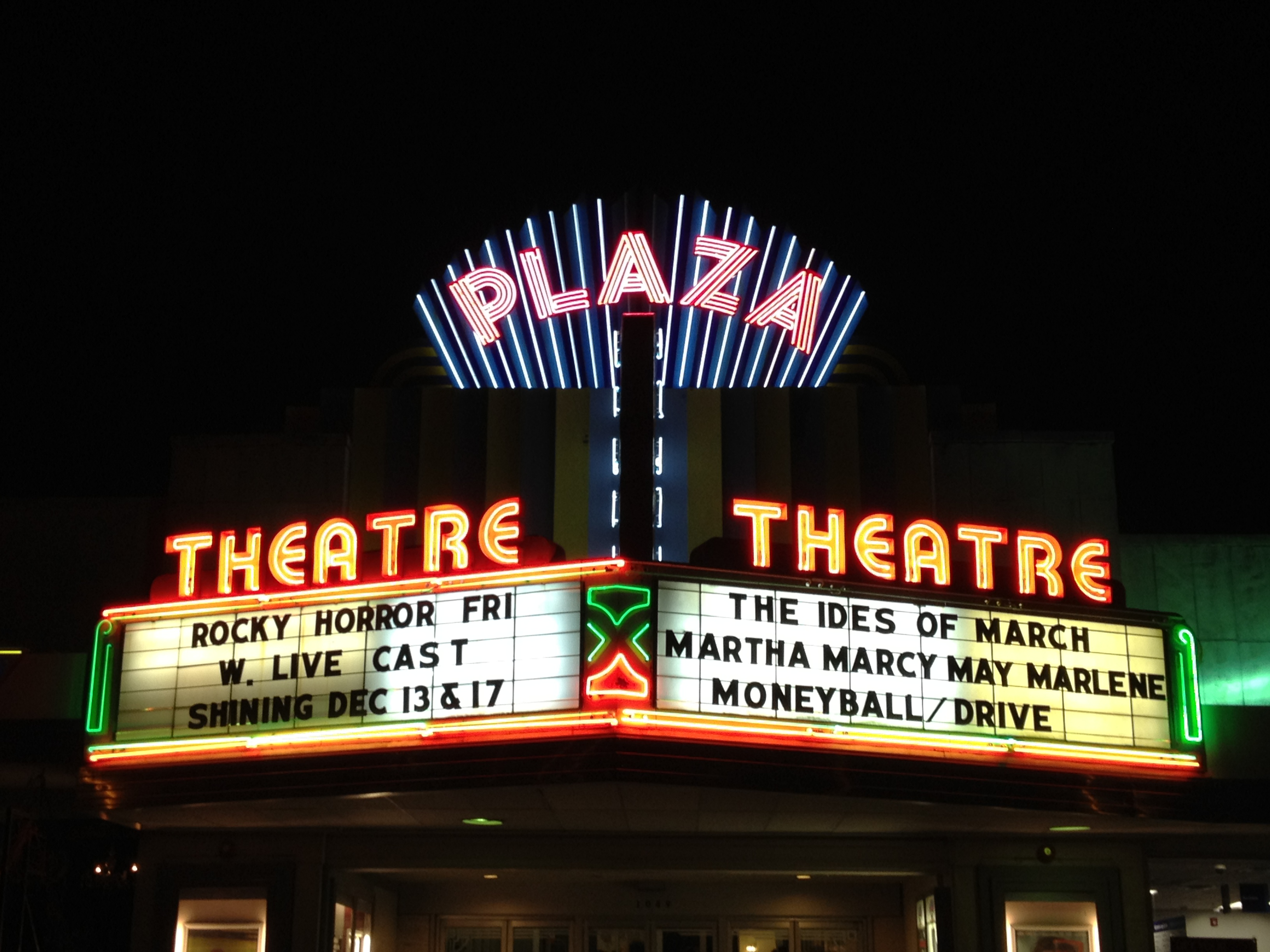
Plaza Theatre at Briarcliff Plaza, southwest corner of North Highland and Ponce de Leon Avenue

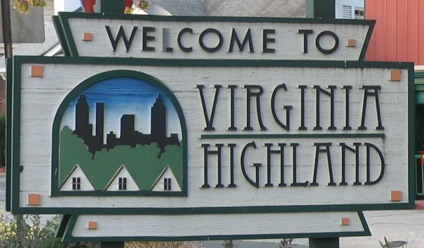
Virginia-Highland welcome sign at the corner of North Highland and Virginia Avenue

Highland Avenue, east of the BeltLine North Highland Avenue, is a major thoroughfare in northeast Atlanta, forming a major business corridor connecting five Intown neighborhoods:

- Highland Avenue begins at Central Park Place NE in the Old Fourth Ward and proceeds eastward past the Atlanta Medical Center and crossing Freedom Parkway a first time.
- It crosses the BeltLine where it becomes North Highland Avenue NE and forms the main retail and entertainment street of Inman Park.
- North Highland Avenue then bends north and crosses Freedom Parkway again, entering the Poncey-Highland neighborhood which takes part of its name from the avenue.
- It then crosses Ponce de Leon Avenue, entering Virginia-Highland, the second neighborhood to take part of its name from the avenue.
- Crossing Amsterdam Ave., North Highland Ave. enters Morningside/Lenox Park, then ends at the intersection with Johnson Road.

== Business districts ==
The North Highland corridor connects multiple small business districts within each neighborhood in Morningside, Virginia-Highland, Poncey Highland, Inman Park and the Old Fourth Ward. Local businesses market the corridor as the "Highland Corridor".

== Events ==
The same Highland corridor is the focus of one of the annual Atlanta Streets Alive pedestrian and cycling events.

== Traffic ==
North Highland Avenue is the focus of a traffic and pedestrian study by the City of Atlanta.
