= Ponce de Leon Avenue =

Avenue in Georgia, US

Coordinates: 33°46′29.6″N 84°20′35″W

- Ponce
- Interactive map of Ponce de Leon Avenue
- Location: DeKalb, Fulton counties
- West end: Spring Street (Atlanta)
- East end: Stone Mountain Lithonia Road

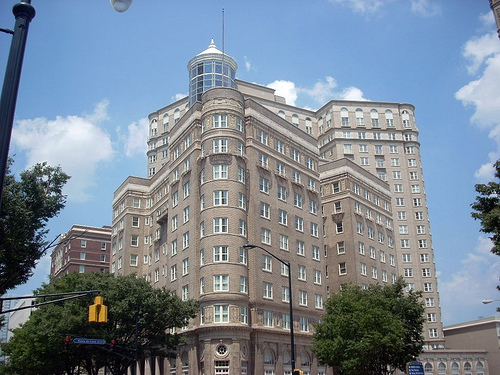
Georgian Terrace Hotel at the corner of Peachtree Street

Ponce de Leon Avenue (/ˌpɒns də ˈliːən/ PONSS də LEE-ən), often simply called Ponce, provides a link between Atlanta, Decatur, Clarkston, and Stone Mountain, Georgia. It was named for Ponce de Leon Springs, in turn from explorer Juan Ponce de León, but is not pronounced as in Spanish. Several grand and historic buildings are located on the avenue.

== History ==
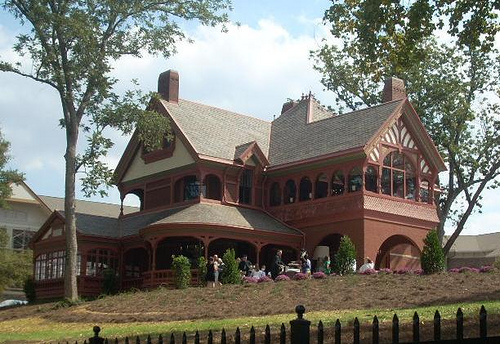
Edward C. Peters House

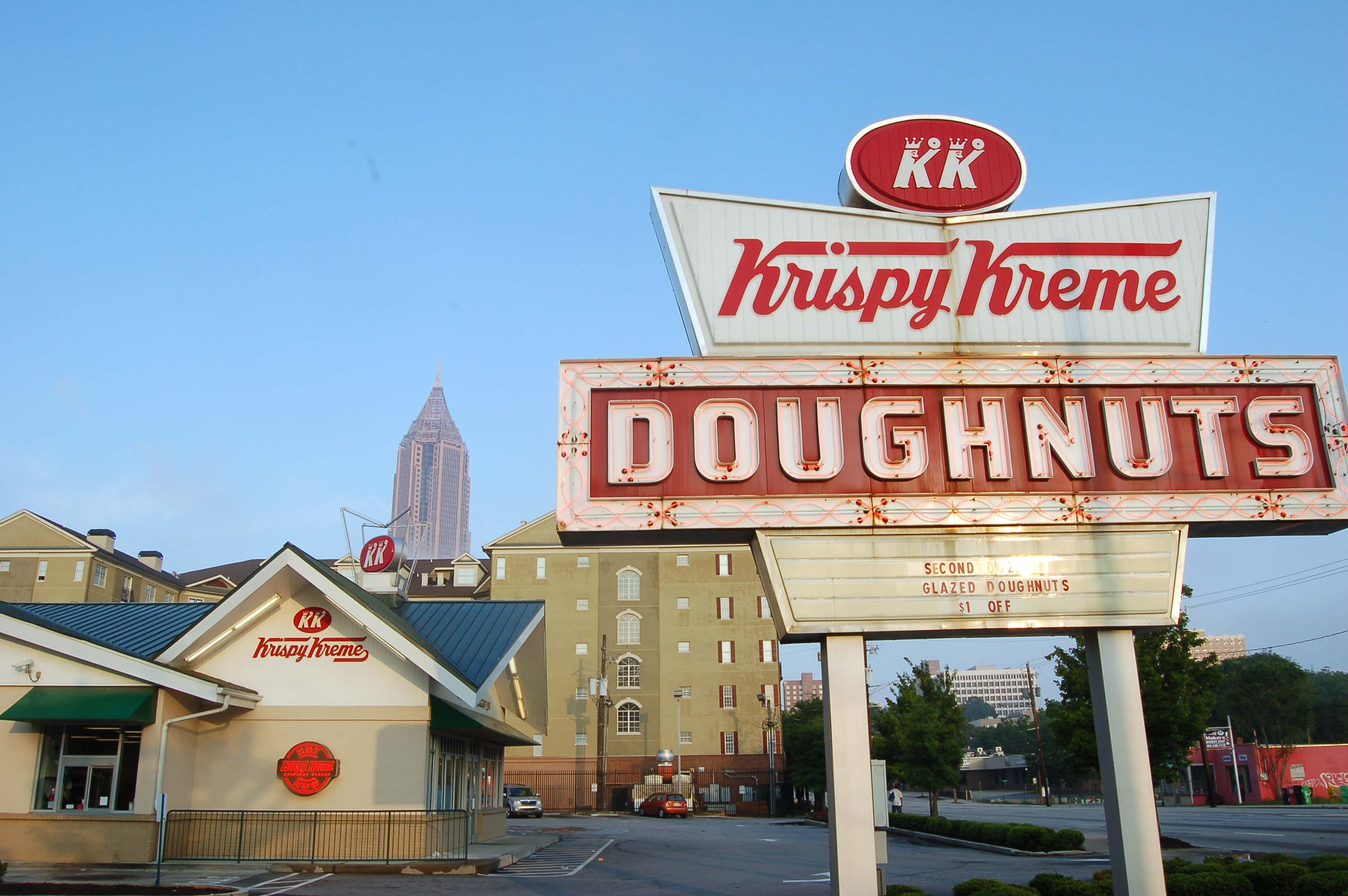
Krispy Kreme bakery and shop

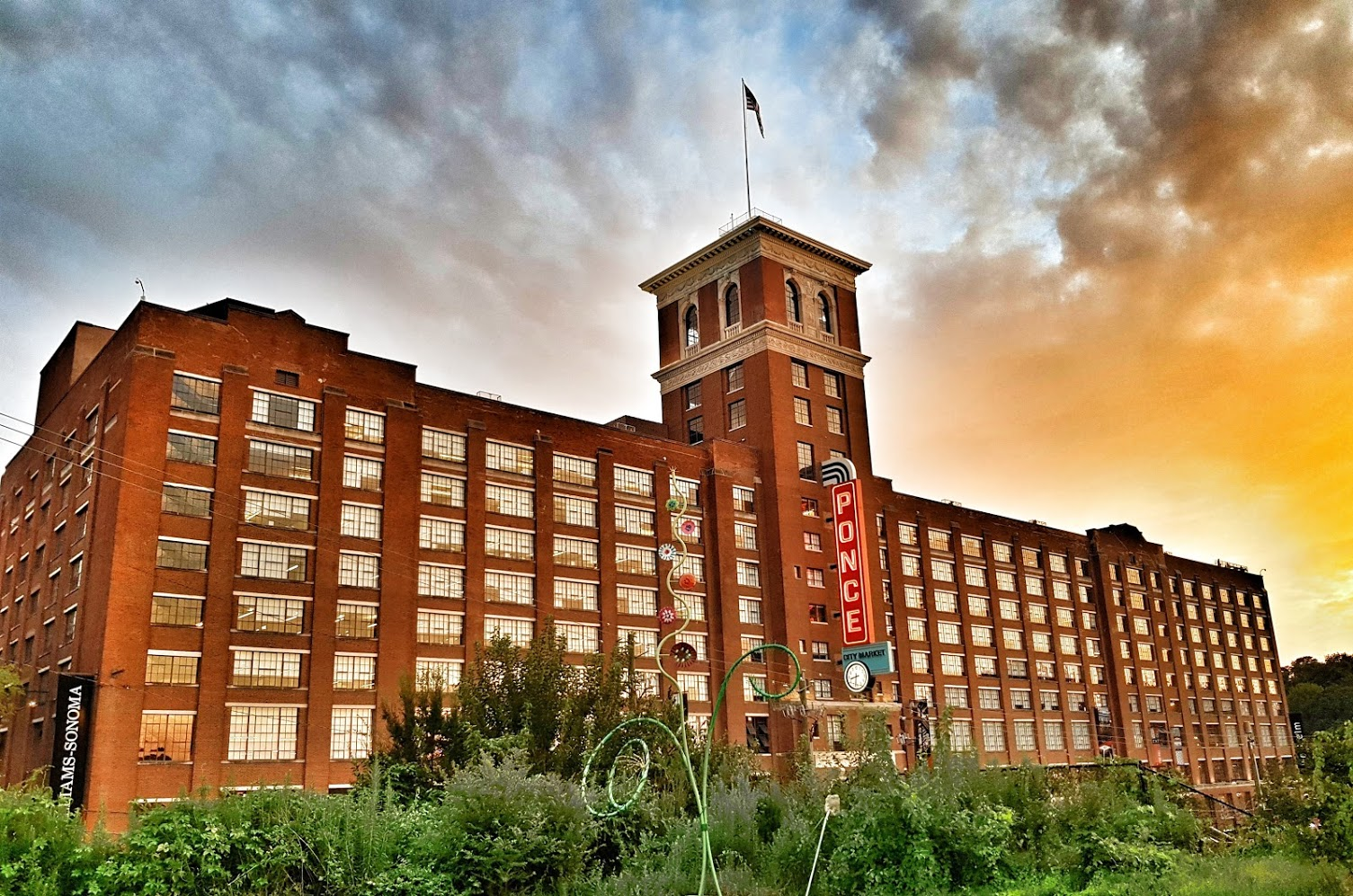
Ponce City Market

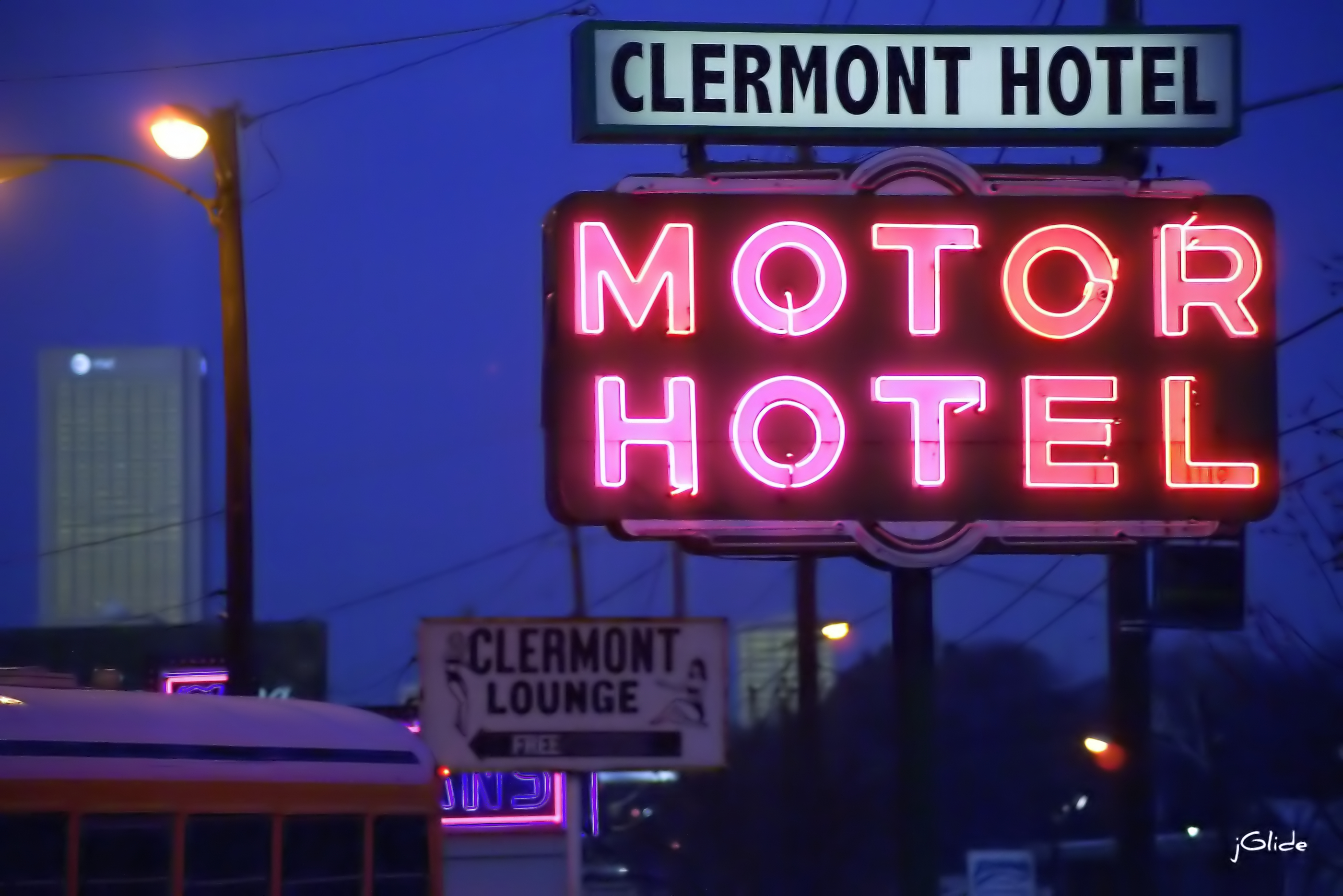
Clermont Hotel and Clermont Lounge

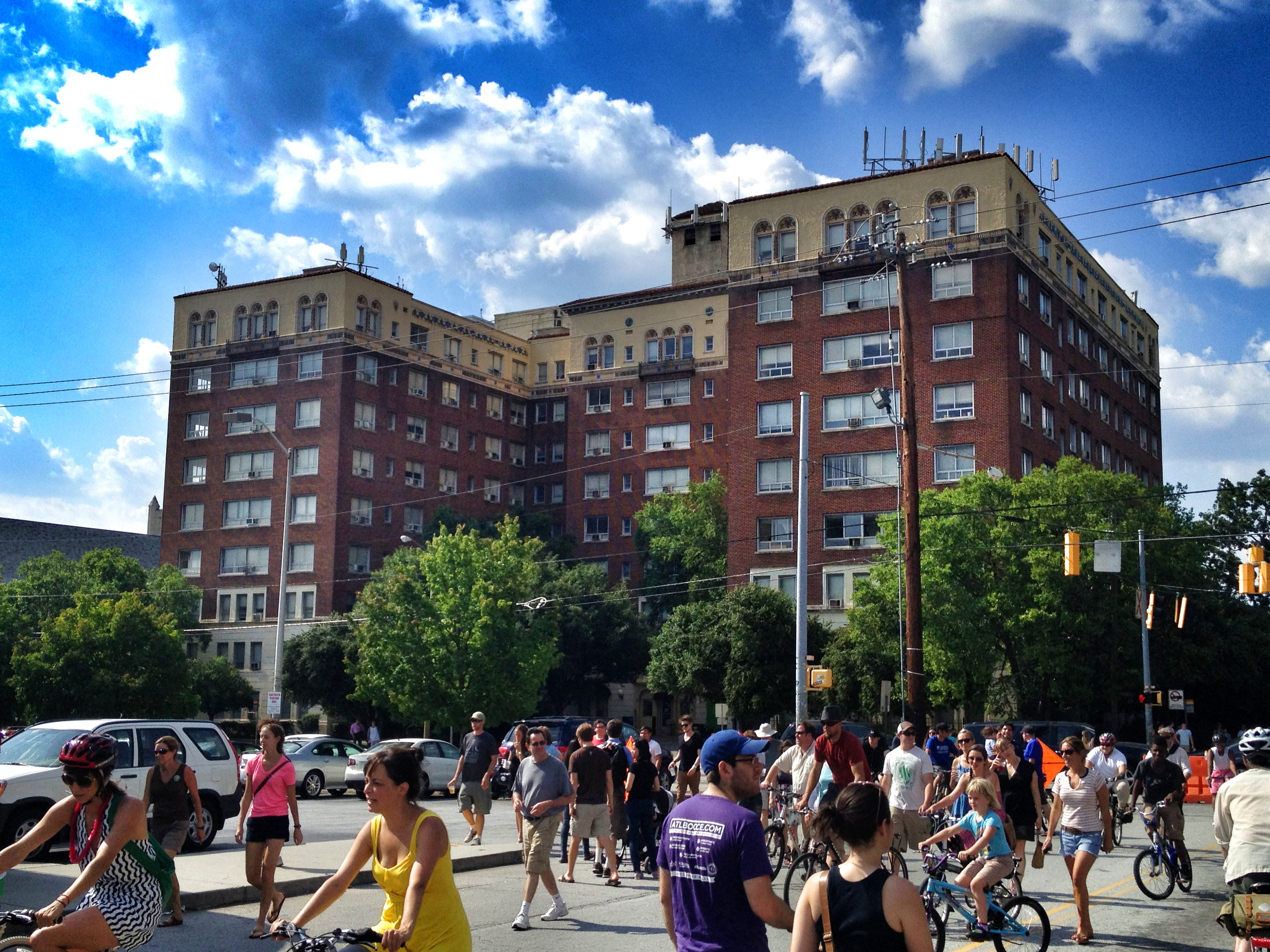
Briarcliff Hotel

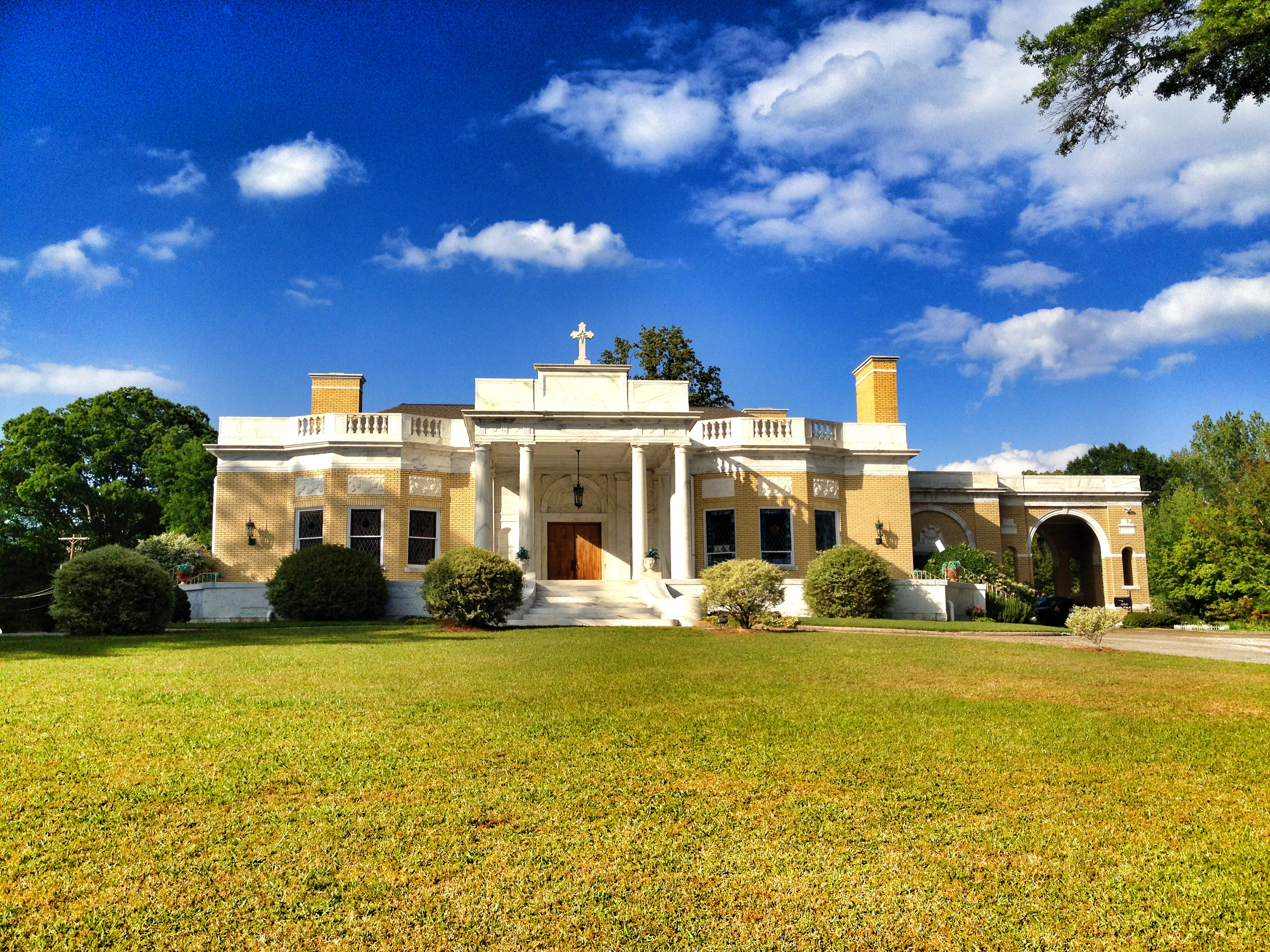
St. John's Chrysostom Melkite Church along in Druid Hills, Atlanta, 2012, formerly the mansion of Asa Griggs Candler (Senior)

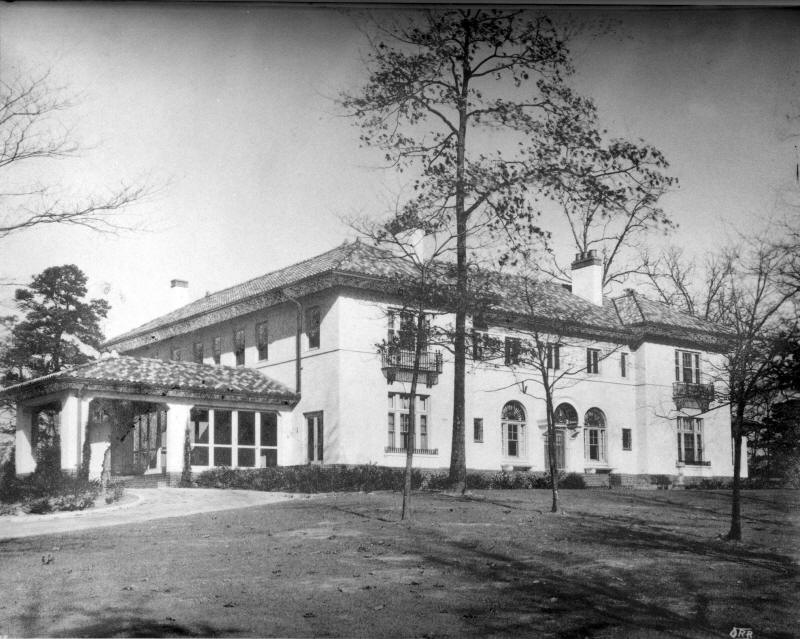
Rainbow Terrace, home of Lucy Beall Candler Owens Heinz Leide at 1610 Ponce de Leon Ave., 1922

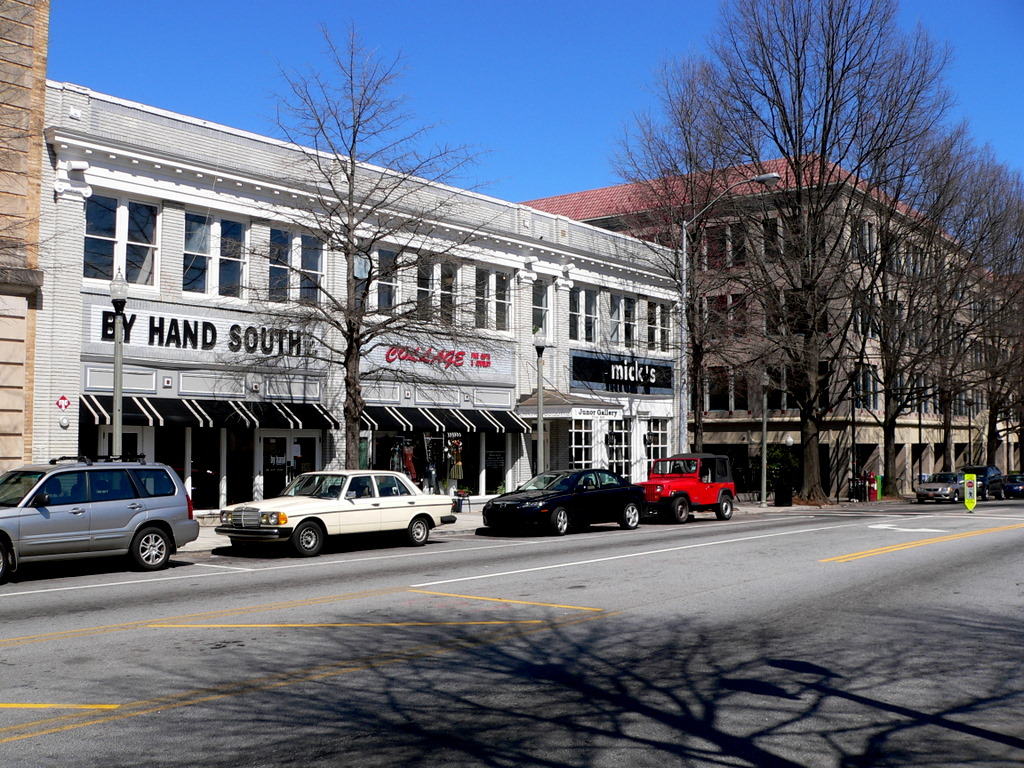
East Ponce de Leon Ave. in downtown Decatur

The original street extended eastward from Peachtree Street and was called Ponce de Leon Circle. In August 1872, a horsecar line that went from downtown Atlanta up Peachtree to Pine, was extended to Ponce de Leon Circle. At some point later, it was extended to Ponce de Leon Springs, where the Ponce de Leon amusement park would be built; today, Ponce City Market (formerly the Sears building, then City Hall East) stands on the site. Finally in 1889, the line was electrified and extended with the "loop" around what is now Virginia-Highland.

West of Peachtree Street were Kimball Street and 2nd Street, portions of which were renamed Ponce de Leon Avenue. (See maps at Atlanta annexations.)

In the 1890s-1910s, Ponce de Leon between Midtown and Moreland Avenue (the border of Druid Hills) was one of the city's premier residential streets lined with large houses of the city's elite. With the arrival of the automobile, the richest families started to move further out, to what is today Buckhead, to Ansley Park and to Druid Hills. Upscale apartment buildings started to appear on the boulevard. Ponce, as did much of the city, lost many of its middle- to upper-middle-class residents in the 1950s and 1960s, and large parking lot areas and new buildings built away from the street made Ponce lose much of the walkability that it had - and its focus gave way fully to automobile traffic. Though a renaissance was beginning in the 1970s, Ponce still was renowned for prostitution, drug sales, but also for its eclectic character up to the turn of the 21st century, celebrated in books such as George Mitchell's Ponce Deleon : An Intimate Portrait of Atlanta's Most Famous Avenue and Sharon Foster's Atlanta's Ponce de Leon Avenue: A History. Today, the areas that Ponce passes on its way from Midtown to Druid Hills are largely affluent: Midtown, the Old Fourth Ward where gentrification is well underway, and fully gentrified Poncey-Highland and Virginia-Highland.

Sam Venable's home on the northeast corner of Ponce de Leon Avenue and Oakdale Road was bought in 1959 for $60,000 by the St. John's Lutheran Church.

== Route and landmarks ==
=== Midtown ===
Ponce de Leon Avenue begins at Spring Street at the south edge of Midtown Atlanta, though prior to the construction of the Downtown Connector, it started a block further west at Williams Street (across from Georgia Tech, one block east of Bobby Dodd Stadium) It passes West Peachtree Street and then Peachtree Street, the city block which has the BellSouth Building (now Tower Square) and the historic Fox Theatre on the north side of the street. At the next two intersections, it takes multiple numbered routes from North Avenue, which runs one block to the south and forms the boundary between Midtown and downtown Atlanta. Via one-way Juniper Street southbound and Piedmont Avenue (formerly part of Georgia 237) northbound, it gets U.S. 29 north, U.S. 78 east, U.S. 278 east, and Georgia 8 east.

=== Historic Midtown and Old Fourth Ward ===
Passing Piedmont Avenue and the Edward C. Peters House, Ponce forms the border of NRHP-listed Historic Midtown to the north and Old Fourth Ward to the south. Here are found the historic Mary Mac's Tea Room, the Kodak Building, the Atlanta Eagle, Atlanta's original Krispy Kreme store, and Grace United Methodist Church. After drifting toward the east-northeast, it passes Boulevard (which continues north as Monroe Drive), and after Glen Iris Drive it passes the north side of the hulking former Sears building, later used as City Hall East, and now as Ponce City Market, a food hall and mixed-use complex. Before Sears, the Ponce de Leon Amusement Park was located here. On the north side of Ponce is the Midtown Place strip mall, on the site of the Ponce de Leon ballpark, which was home to the Atlanta Crackers and Atlanta Black Crackers baseball teams.

=== Poncey-Highland and Virginia-Highland ===
Ponce de Leon Avenue then passes under a former rail bridge which is part of the BeltLine trail, after which it forms the border between the Poncey-Highland neighborhood to the south and Virginia-Highland to the north. After the now-redeveloped Ford Motor Company Assembly Plant bordering the BeltLine, it passes the Clermont Hotel and Clermont Lounge and then the north end of Freedom Parkway, where it also picks up the route designation Georgia 10 east. It then passes 725 Ponce, a mixed-use development on the former site of a supermarket nicknamed "Murder Kroger". A few blocks further east is the intersection with North Highland Avenue (from which the name of Poncey-Highland is derived), and at this intersection are found the historic Plaza Theatre and Briarcliff Hotel, designed by the same architect as Atlanta City Hall and once home to Coca-Cola heir Asa G. Candler Jr. Druid Hills Presbyterian Church, despite the name, is also located in this area, across the street from Briarcliff Plaza.

=== Druid Hills ===
After crossing the intersection of Georgia 42 (Moreland Avenue south and Briarcliff Road north), it gets a sixth route number: U.S. 23 north. Although still within Atlanta city limits, it also crosses the county line from Fulton into DeKalb at this street and enters the Druid Hills neighborhood. Here are the early 20th century mansions of Atlanta's wealthy including the St. John's Chrysostom Melkite Church along in Druid Hills, Atlanta, 2012, formerly the mansion of Asa Griggs Candler (Senior), and Rainbow Terrace, home of Lucy Beall Candler Owens Heinz Leide at number 1610.

The Druid Hills Historic District incorporates the earlier Druid Hills Parks and Parkways Historic District that was listed on the National Register in 1975, specifically recognizing the parks and parkways along Ponce de Leon Avenue.

The road begins to gradually curve back and forth, and is followed on its south side by South Ponce de Leon Avenue, the land between them being Oak Grove Park. A second segment of linear park is called Dellwood Park, and around Clifton Road it finally leaves the city, just before passing the south side of the Fernbank Museum of Natural History. A third segment called North Ponce de Leon Avenue surrounds a heavily forested county park called Deepdene Park, and on its south side, mainline Ponce de Leon Avenue loses U.S. 278 and Georgia 10 at a split with East Lake Road.

=== Decatur ===
After a northward curve, it loses its other four route numbers at a split with Scott Boulevard, and continues eastward into the city of Decatur as West Ponce de Leon Avenue. Crossing the centerpoint of downtown at Clairemont Avenue (north) and McDonough Street (south), near city hall and the Decatur MARTA station, it becomes East Ponce de Leon Avenue.

=== East of Decatur ===
It then continues on through Scottdale and downtown Clarkston to become Main Street southward through downtown Stone Mountain, then becoming Stone Mountain Lithonia Road on its way south to Lithonia.

It is also an exit at mile 40 off Interstate 285 ("the Perimeter") north. The only way to access I-285 south is to exit onto Church Street, since this is a split diamond interchange, and the two roads run parallel to each other separated by a railroad line.

== Improvements ==
Ponce de Leon Avenue in the City of Atlanta is included in the Ponce/Moreland Corridors Plan as part of the city's comprehensive development plan.

As of April 2011, the Georgia Department of Transportation has decided to begin the design of safety improvements for pedestrians on the two-mile stretch of Ponce between Piedmont and N. Highland/Moreland. Changes proposed include the conversion of an eastbound traffic lane into a two-way left-turn lane and bike lanes in both directions. The land would include intermittent traffic islands and "HAWK" pedestrian crossing signals at selected crosswalks where no traffic signals currently exist.

== Major intersections ==
=== as East Ponce de Leon Avenue (Decatur east to Stone Mountain) ===
County	Location	Roads Intersected	Notes
DeKalb	Decatur	Clairmont Avenue	Western terminus; road continues from West Ponce de Leon Avenue
DeKalb	Decatur	Church Street	
DeKalb	Decatur	SR 155 (Commerce Drive)	
DeKalb	Decatur	North Arcadia Avenue / Sams Crossing	Avondale MARTA Transit Station
DeKalb	Decatur	DeKalb Industrial Way	DeVry Technical Institute
DeKalb	Scottdale	North Clarendon Avenue	
DeKalb	Scottdale	North Decatur Road	
DeKalb	Scottdale	Valley Brook Road	To North DeKalb Mall
DeKalb	Scottdale	McLendon Drive	
DeKalb	Clarkston	I-285 north, Exit 40	Split-diamond interchange; Northbound entrance and southbound exit, I-285 south can be accessed by accessing Church Street, as it is parallel with East Ponce de Leon Avenue, and both roads are separated by a railroad track.
DeKalb	Clarkston	North Indian Creek Drive	
DeKalb	Clarkston	Brockett Road	
DeKalb	Clarkston / Tucker	Idlewood Road	
DeKalb	Stone Mountain	Rays Road	
DeKalb	Stone Mountain	Hambrick Road	Hambrick Elementary School
DeKalb	Stone Mountain	Mountain Industrial Boulevard / North Hairston Road	To Tucker
DeKalb	Stone Mountain	Rock Mountain Boulevard	
DeKalb	Stone Mountain	SR 10 (Stone Mountain Bypass)	To US 78 (Stone Mountain Freeway, Snellville) / SR 410
DeKalb	Stone Mountain	James B. Rivers Memorial Drive	Eastern terminus Road continues as Main Street
