= Briarcliff Plaza =

Strip mall-type shopping center in Atlanta, Georgia, USA

Coordinates: 33.7733°N 84.3530°W

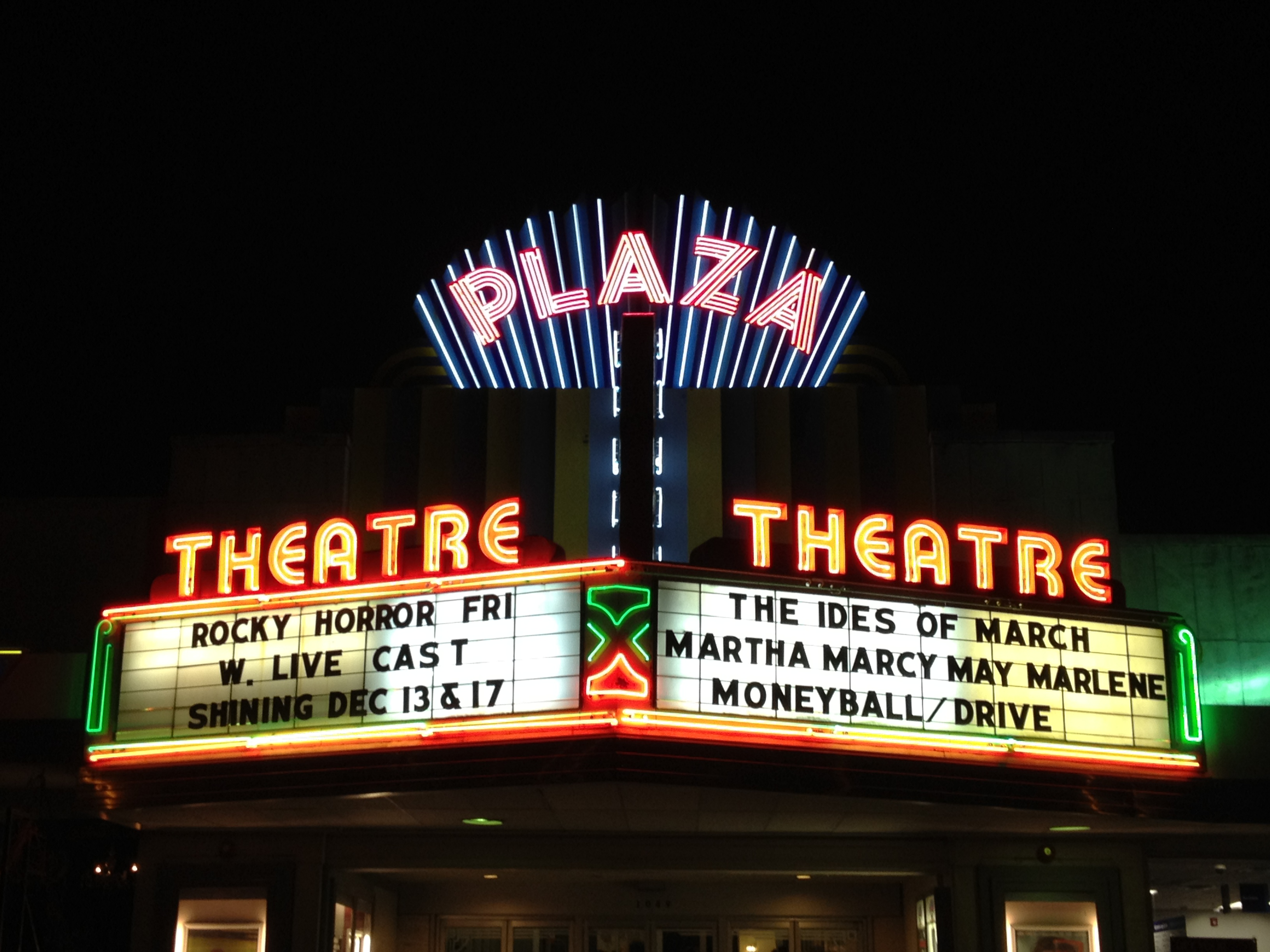
Plaza Theatre at Briarcliff Plaza

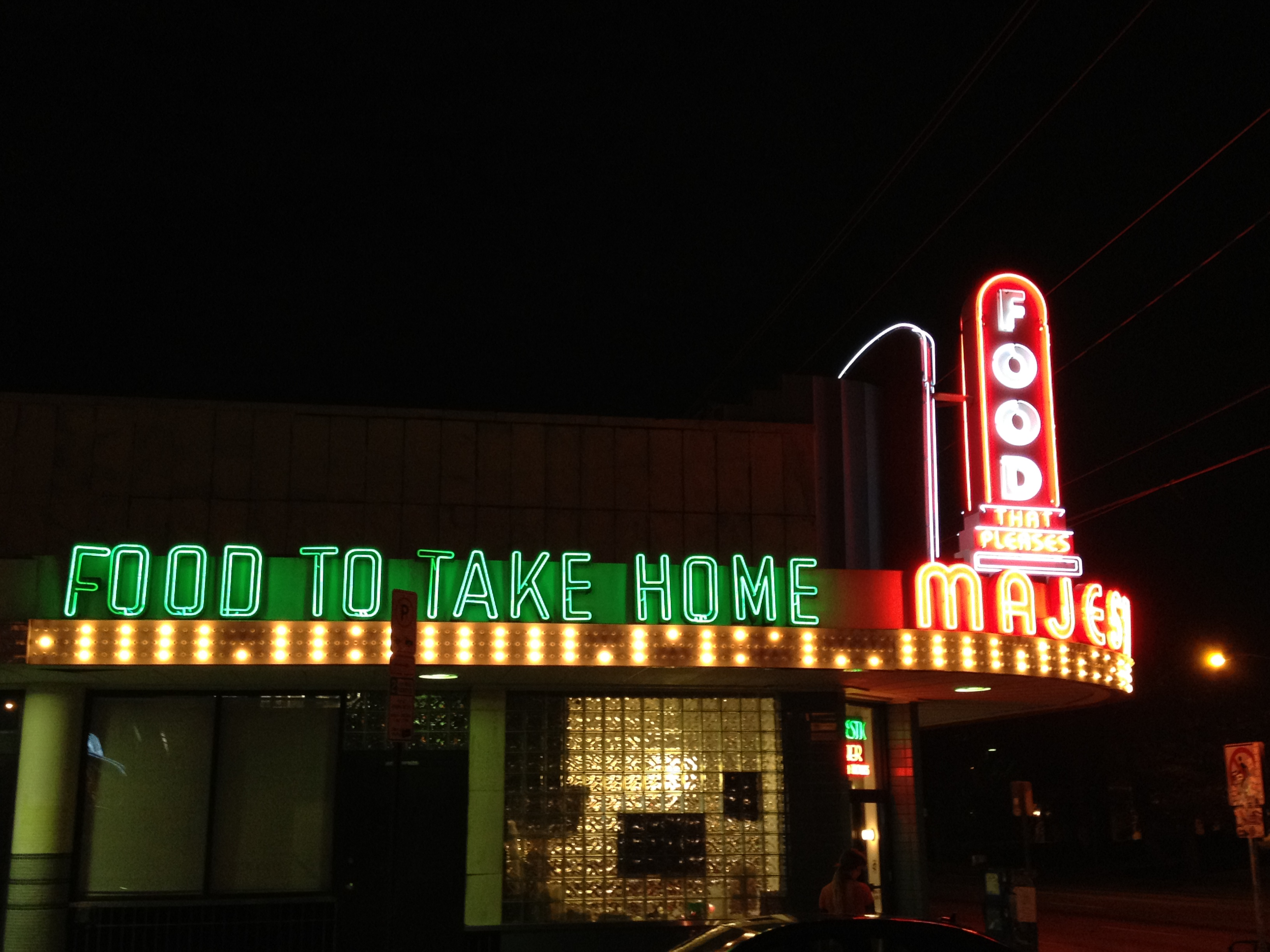
Majestic Diner at Briarcliff Plaza

Briarcliff Plaza, also known as Ponce de Leon Plaza, is a strip mall-type shopping center designed by architect George Harwell Bond and opened in 1939 at the southwest corner of Ponce de Leon Avenue and Highland Avenue in the Poncey-Highland neighborhood of Atlanta. Braircliff Plaza was developed by Relnac Inc., and was proposed to cost $300,000. Construction began after the last home on the block was purchased by Relnac Inc., the Dr. Robin Adair estate, and Briarcliff Plaza opened throughout 1939 with businesses such as Dupree Dry Cleaners, Blick's Bowling Alley, Holcomb Flowers, the Georgia Fruit & Vegetable Company and Nick Caruso's Big Place which offered shoe repair, pressing, repairing and hat cleaning. It was Atlanta's first shopping center with off-street parking. It is anchored by the historic Plaza Theatre and Urban Outfitters. A portion of the historic plaza area was listed on the National Register of Historic Places in 2020.

== Druid Apartments ==
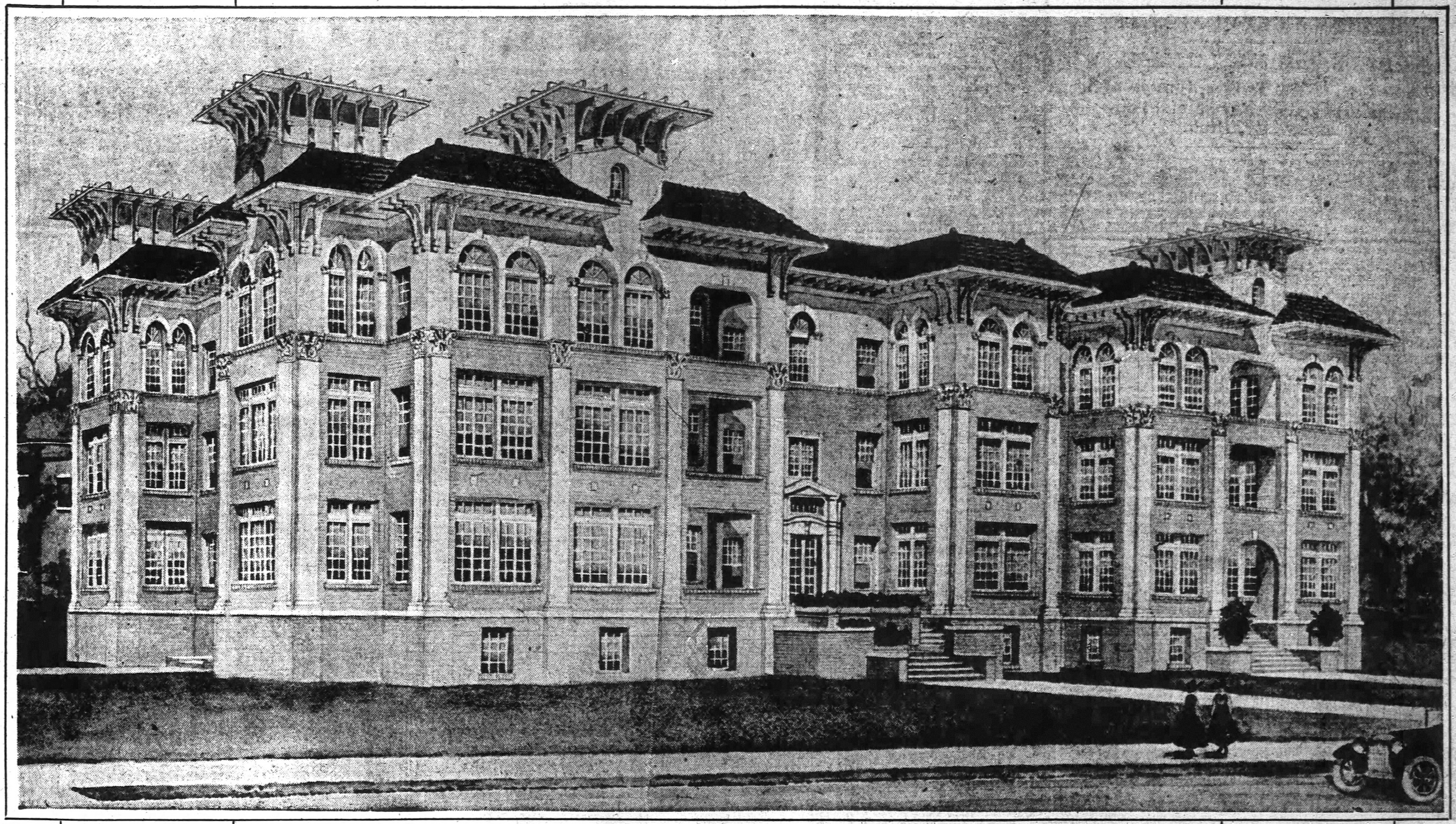
Druid Apartments (1917), which originally occupied the site

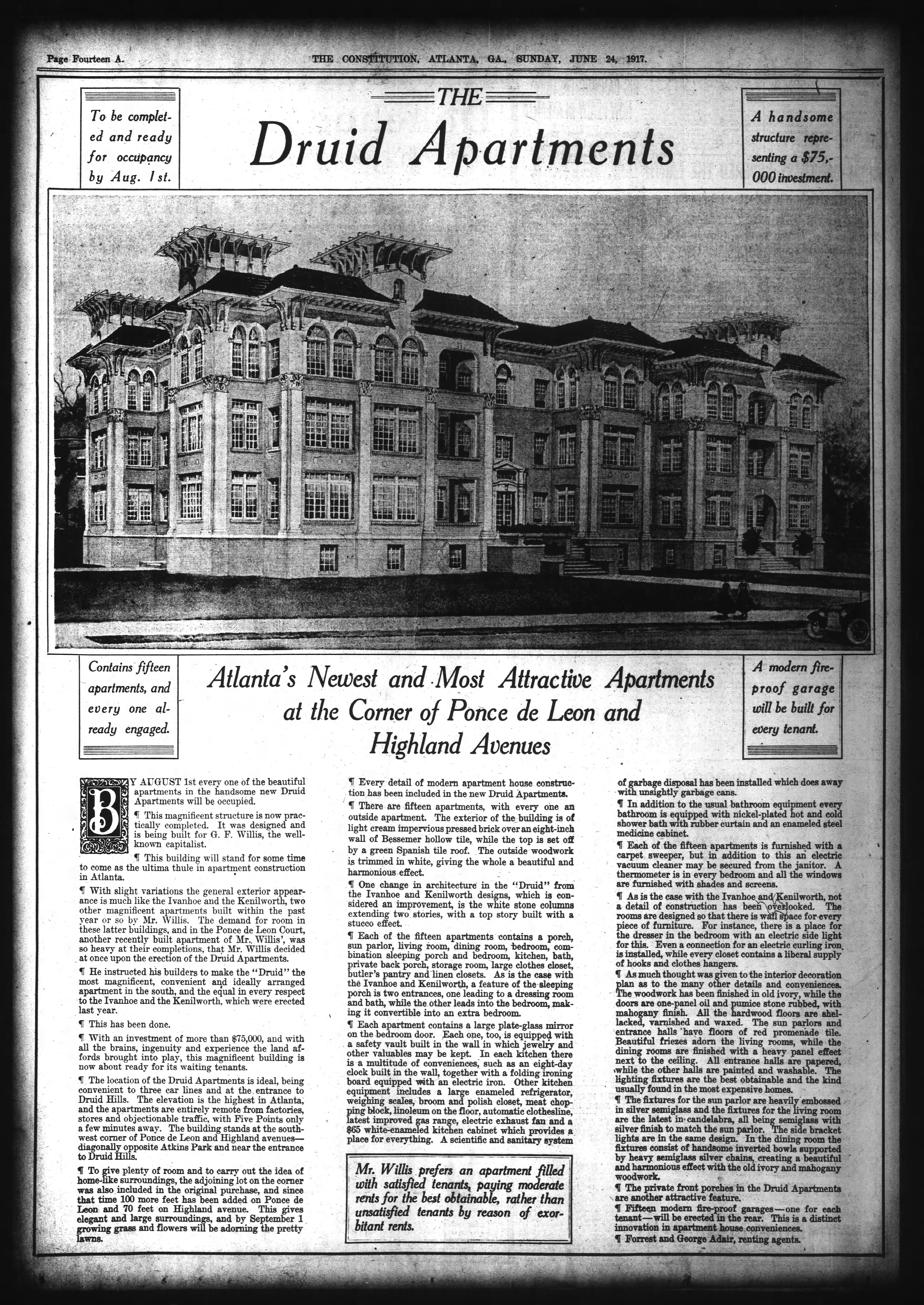
1917 advertisement promoting the Druid Apartments

The Druid Apartments originally occupied the site. The $75,000 building was built in 1917 as a project of patent medicine magnate and real estate developer George Francis Willis. In 1920, Forrest and George Adair brokered a deal whereby Willis sold the apartments for $125,000 to Alex F. Marcus and Charles F. Ursenbach - both brothers-in-law of Leo Frank, who had famously been lynched in 1915.
