= Eastside Trail =

Walking and biking trail in Georgia, United States

The Eastside Trail is a walking and biking trail running roughly north-south through the Eastside of Atlanta, forming part of the Beltline ring of trails and parks. It is lined with numerous notable industrial buildings adapted into restaurants, shops, apartments, condos, and two major food halls and mixed-use developments. The corridor between Ponce City Market and the Old Fourth Ward is frequently cited as the busiest stretch of the Beltline trail network, drawing heavy foot and bike traffic especially on weekends.

The first two-mile (3.2 km) stretch opened in October 2012, from Piedmont Park to the Krog Street Tunnel. It was extended from Krog Street to Kirkwood Avenue in November 2017. A second extension brought it to Memorial Drive in July 2019. Memorial Drive is no longer the trail's southern endpoint; the path continues south into Reynoldstown, where it connects to the Southeast Trail toward Glenwood Park.

At its northern end, the Eastside Trail meets the Northeast Trail at the intersection of 10th Street and Monroe Drive. Northeast Trail – Segment 1, a 0.9-mile section running through Piedmont Park from Monroe Drive to Westminster Drive, opened in late 2024 after groundbreaking in August 2023, providing a continuous paved connection from the Eastside Trail through the park toward Ansley Park, Piedmont Heights, and ultimately the Lindbergh MARTA station once later segments are complete.

A separate project along Ponce de Leon Avenue, part of a broader streetscape improvement effort, added a new elevated access ramp linking the Eastside Trail directly to Ponce de Leon Avenue near Ponce City Market at the northwestern corner of the Ponce de Leon Avenue bridge. More than a decade in planning, the ramp opened to the public in November 2025, following the Atlanta Beltline's announcement in late October 2025 that the associated Ponce de Leon Avenue streetscape project was complete.

== Route and points of interest ==
| Thoroughfares crossed | Points of interest (west side of trail, south of thoroughfare) | Points of interest (east side of trail, south of thoroughfare) | Neighborhood bordered (west of trail, south of thoroughfare) | Neighborhood bordered (east of trail, south of thoroughfare) |
|---|---|---|---|---|
| I-85 | North end of interim trail, Ansley Golf Club | Ansley Mall | Ansley Park | Morningside/Lenox Park |
| Piedmont Avenue | Piedmont Park | Amsterdam Walk | Piedmont Park | Morningside/Lenox Park |
| Amsterdam Avenue | | | Virginia-Highland | Virginia-Highland |
| 10th Street/ Virginia Avenue | Midtown Promenade, Midtown Place; junction with Northeast Trail toward Piedmont Park and Lindbergh | | Midtown Atlanta Historic District | Virginia-Highland |
| Ponce de Leon Avenue | Ponce City Market | Ford Factory Lofts, Murder Kroger | Old Fourth Ward | Poncey-Highland |
| North Avenue | DuPre Excelsior Mill (former Masquerade), Gateway Trail to Historic Fourth Ward Park | Telephone Factory Lofts | Old Fourth Ward | Poncey-Highland |
| Ralph McGill Boulevard | Historic Fourth Ward Skatepark | Carter Center | Old Fourth Ward | Poncey-Highland |
| Freedom Parkway, Freedom Park Trail | | N. Highland Steel and other Inman Park Village adapted industrial buildings | Old Fourth Ward | Inman Park |
| Irwin St./ Lake Ave. | | Krog Street Market | Old Fourth Ward | Inman Park |
| Edgewood Avenue | | | Old Fourth Ward | Inman Park |
| DeKalb Avenue/ Decatur Street | | Krog Street Tunnel, Hulsey Yard, MARTA line | Cabbagetown | Cabbagetown |
| Kirkwood Avenue | | | Reynoldstown | Reynoldstown |
| Memorial Drive | | | Reynoldstown | Reynoldstown |

== Gallery ==
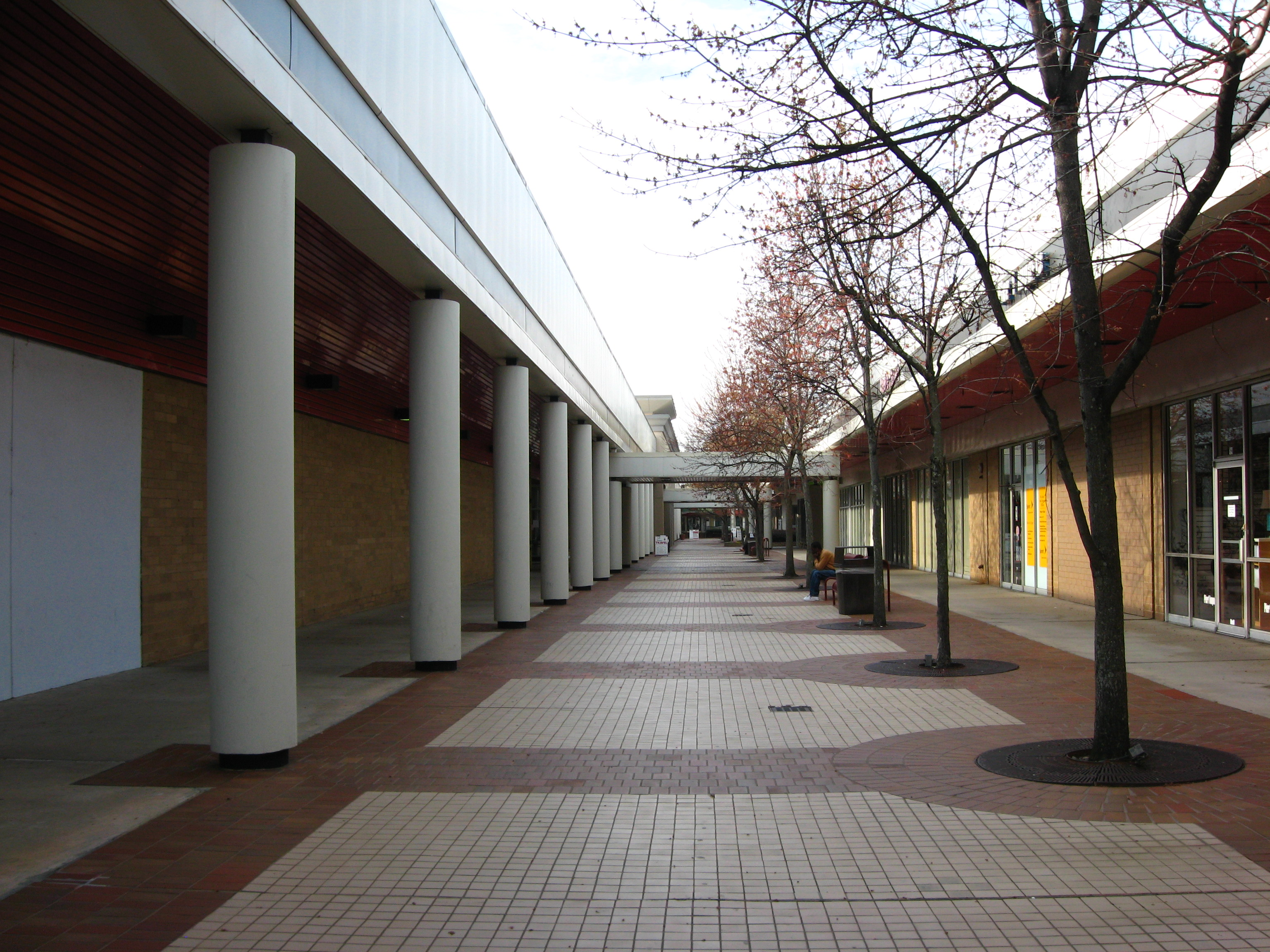
Ansley Mall

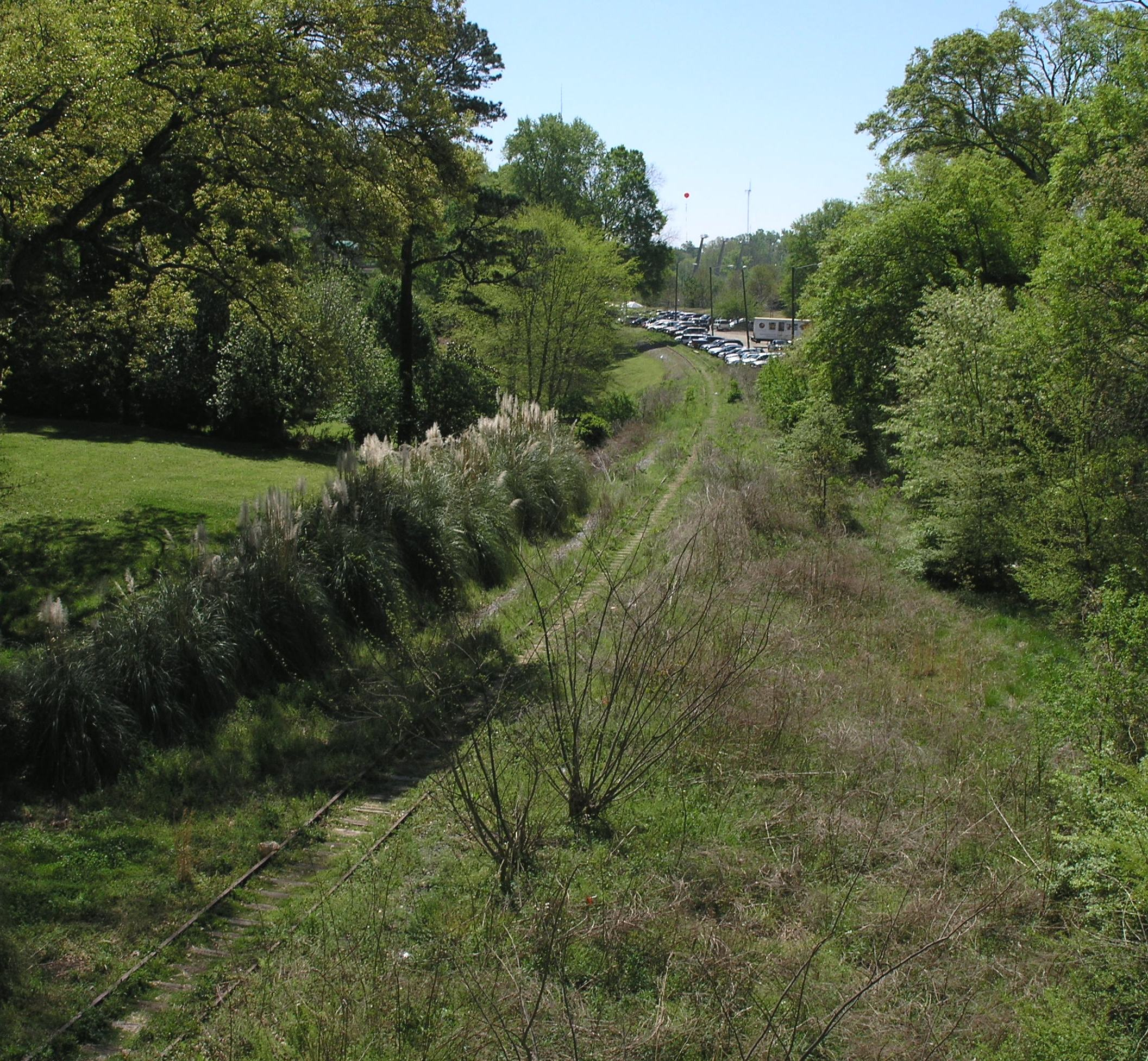
Interim trail adjacent to Piedmont Park, 2006

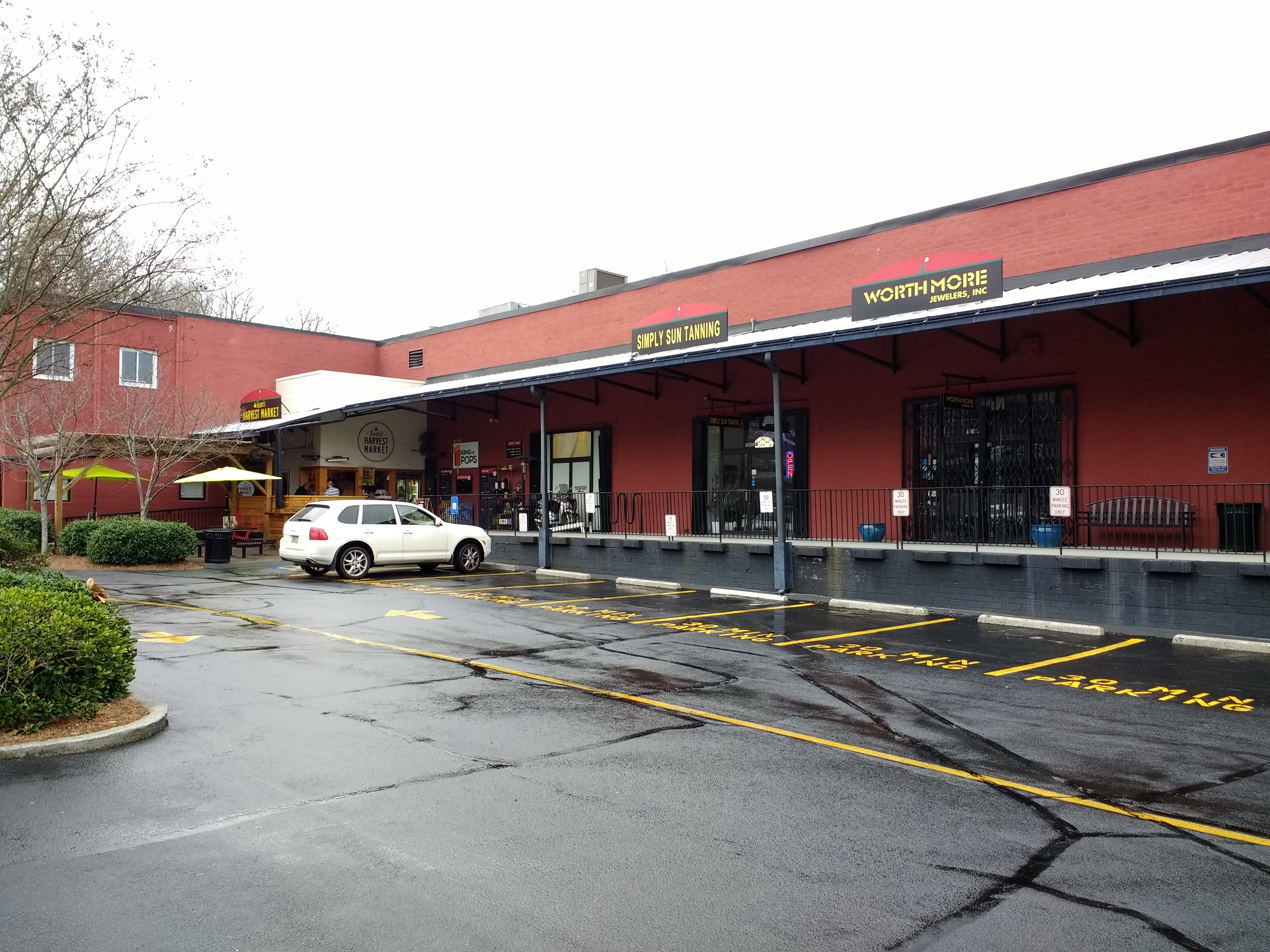
Amsterdam Walk

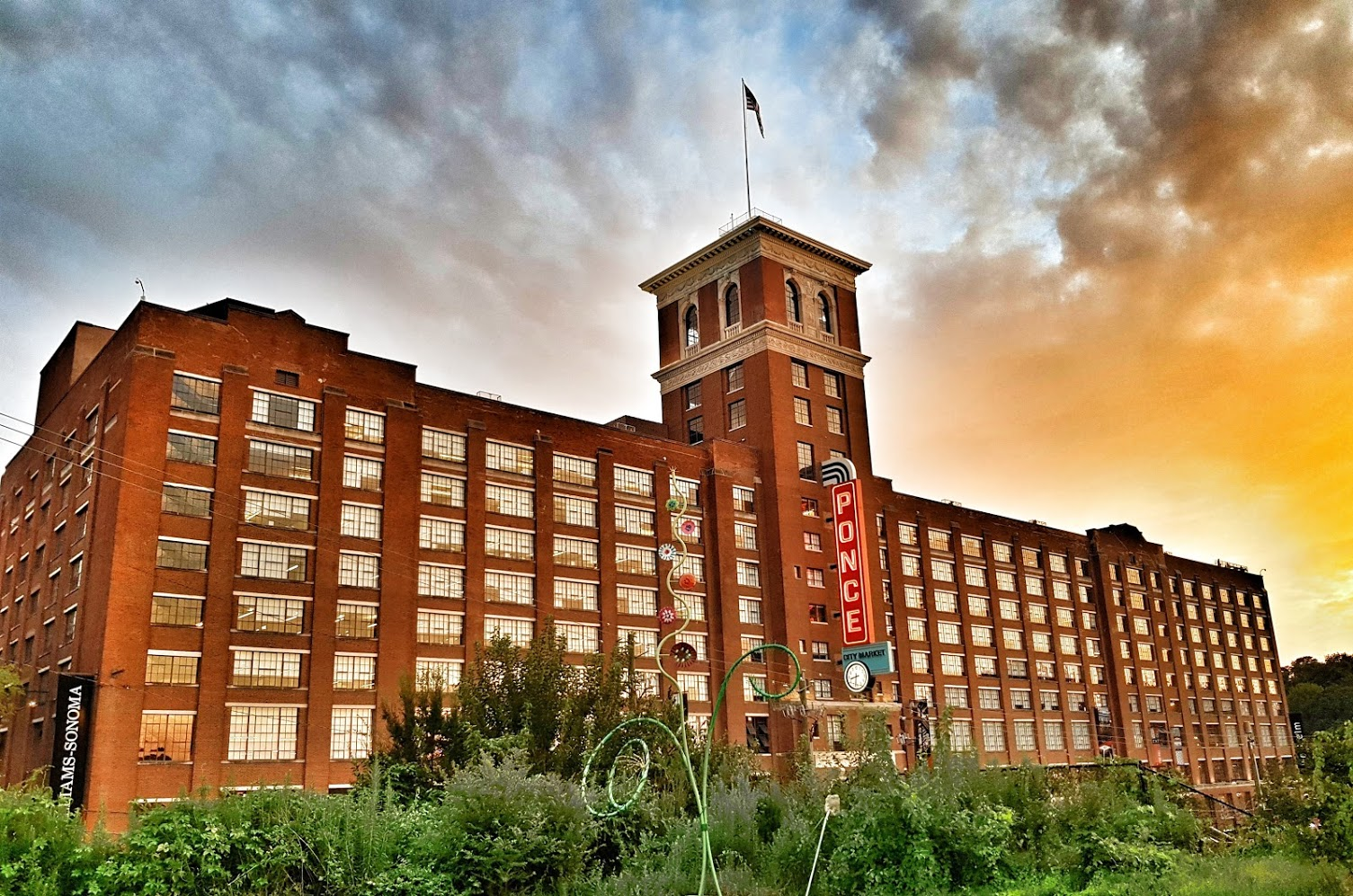
Ponce City Market seen from Beltline

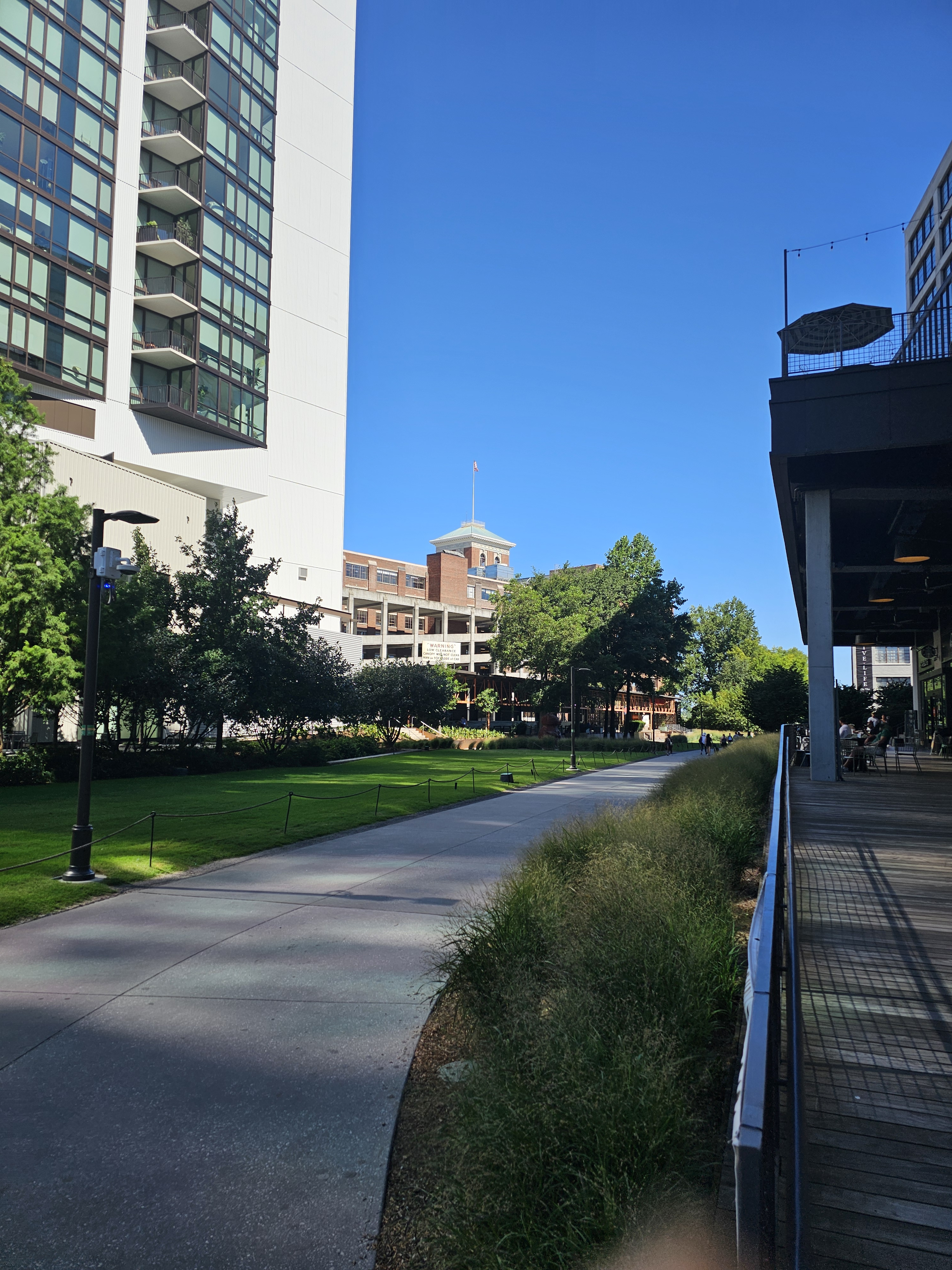
Ponce City Market and Kroger seen from Beltline in 2025

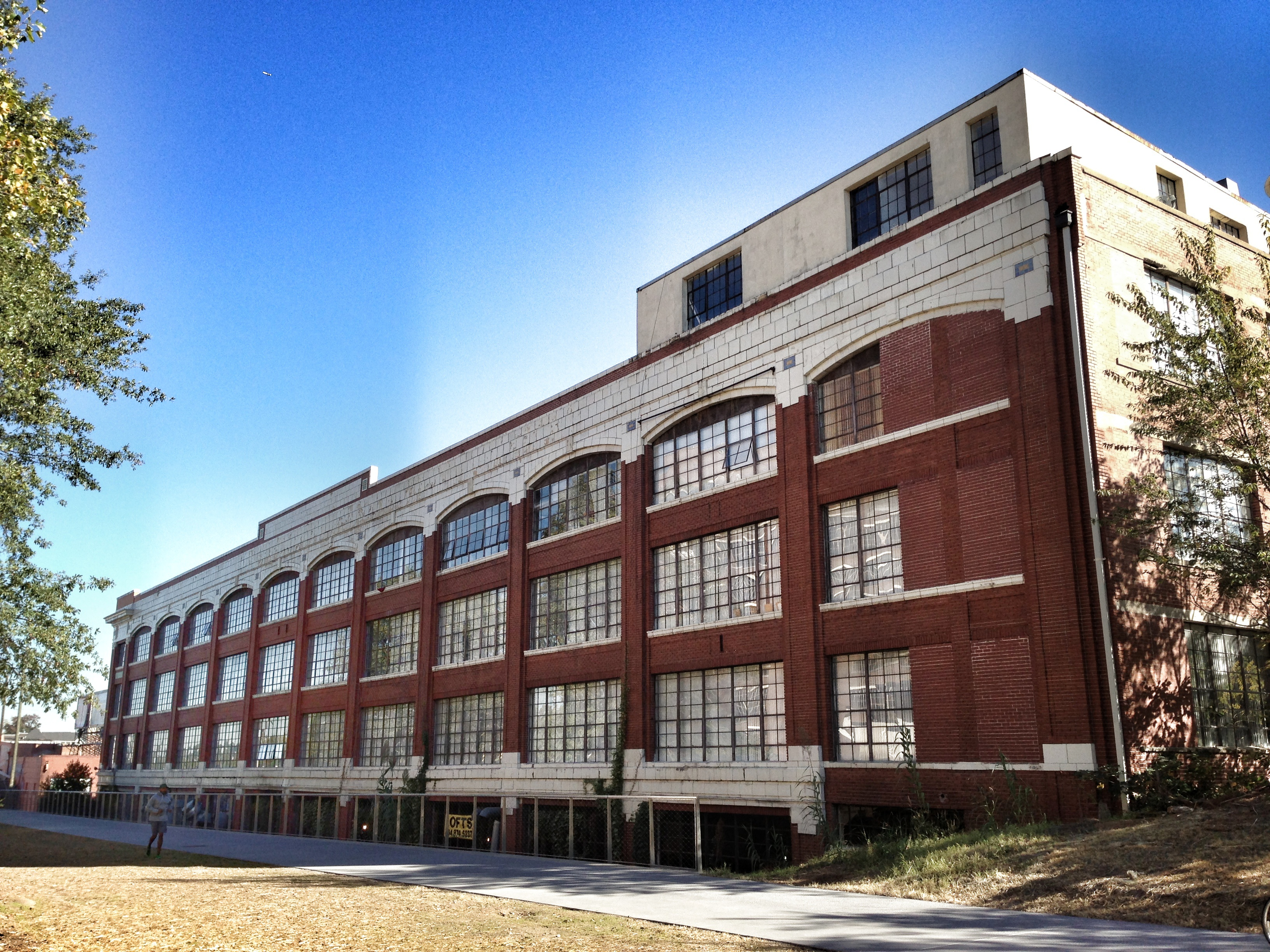
Ford Factory Lofts seen from Beltline, 2012

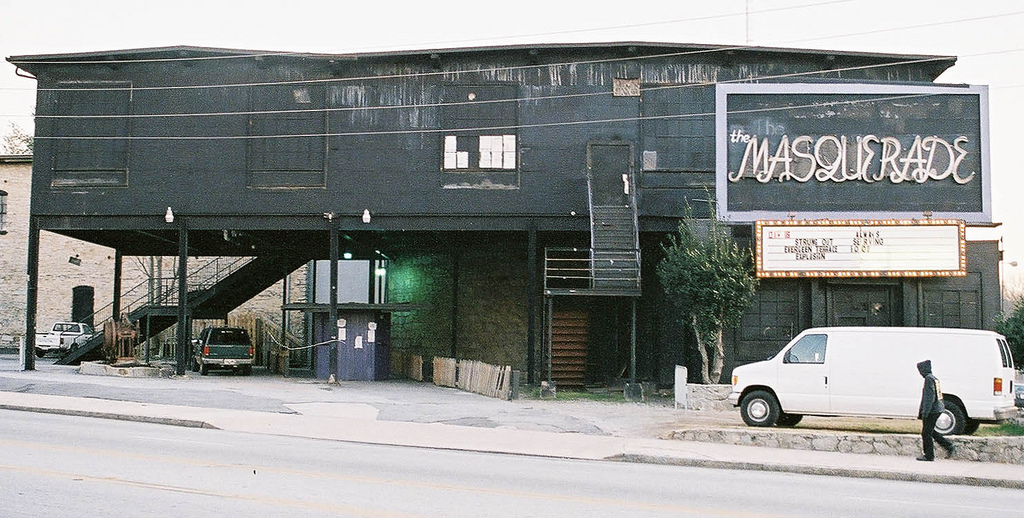
DuPre Excelsior Mill

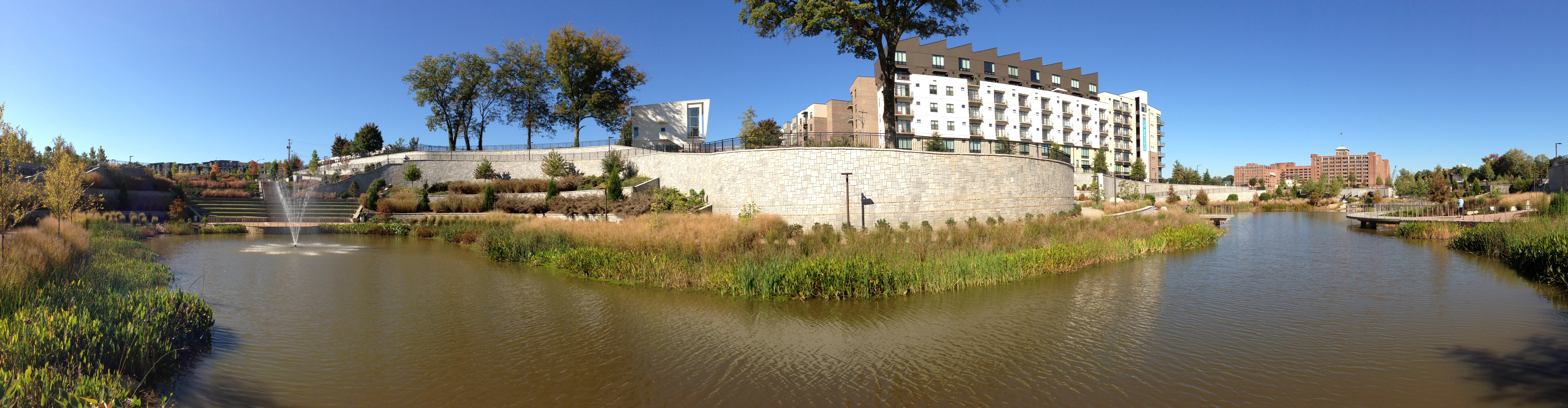
Historic Fourth Ward Park

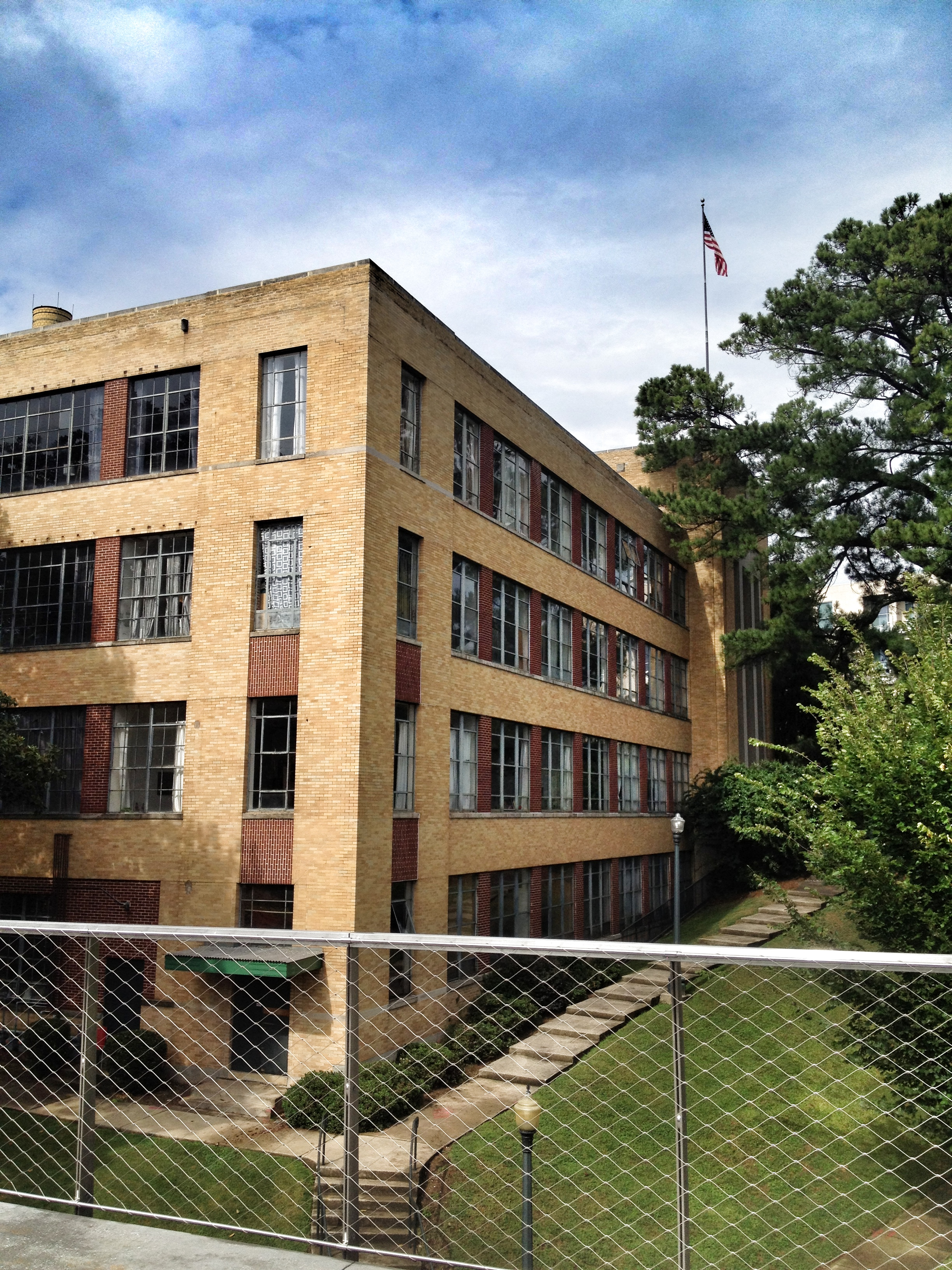
Telephone Factory Lofts

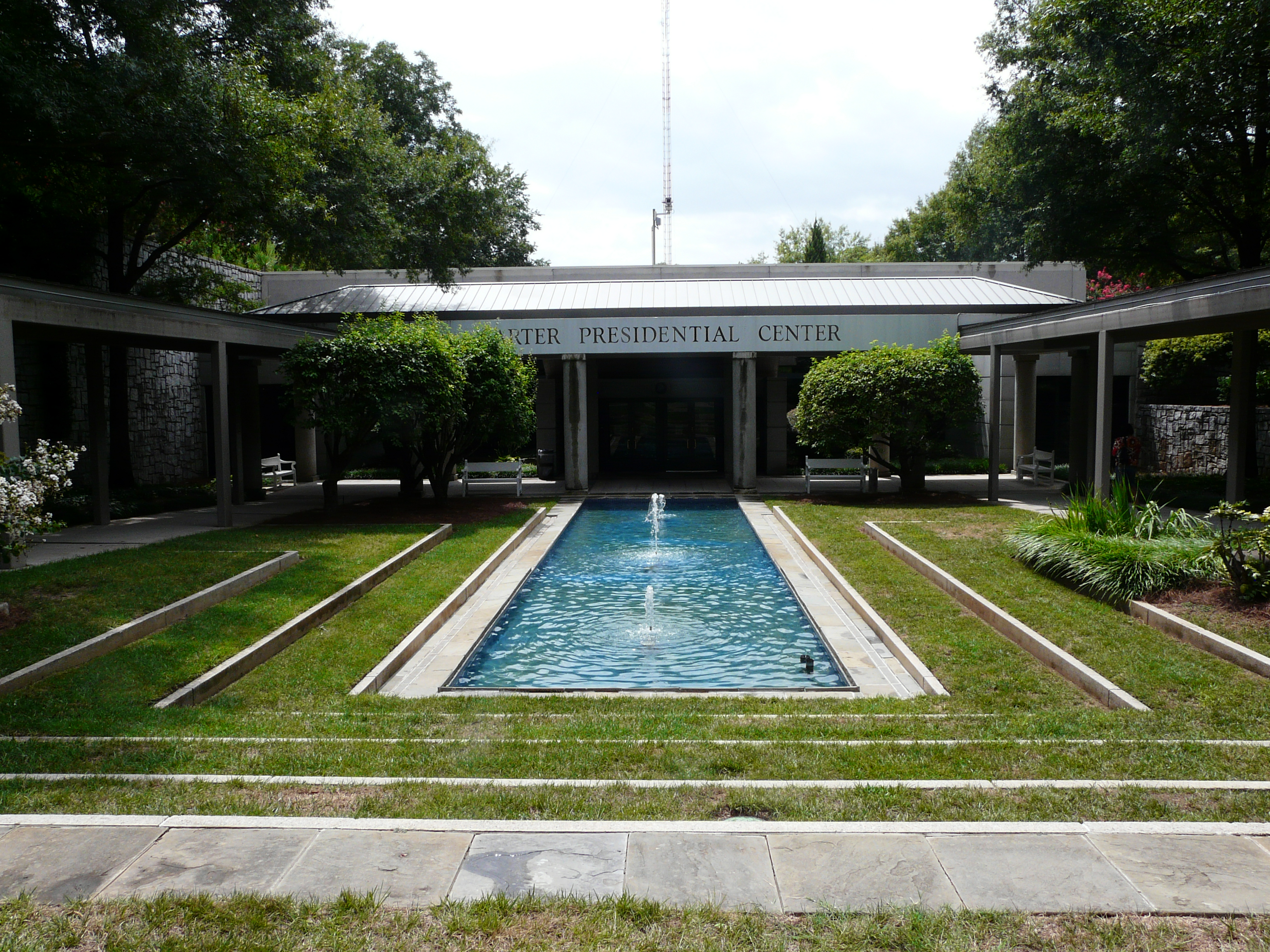
Carter Center

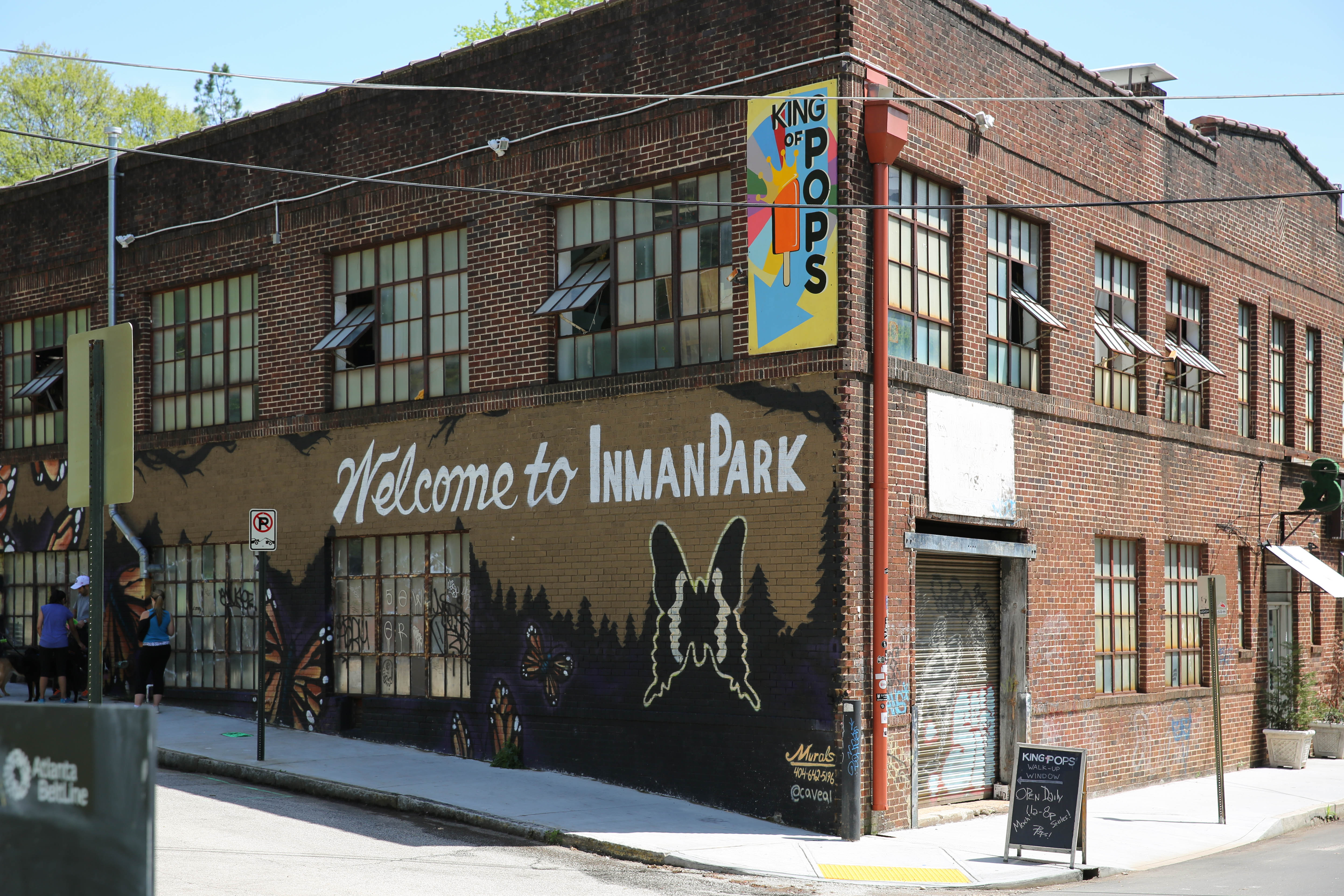
Inman Park former industrial buildings

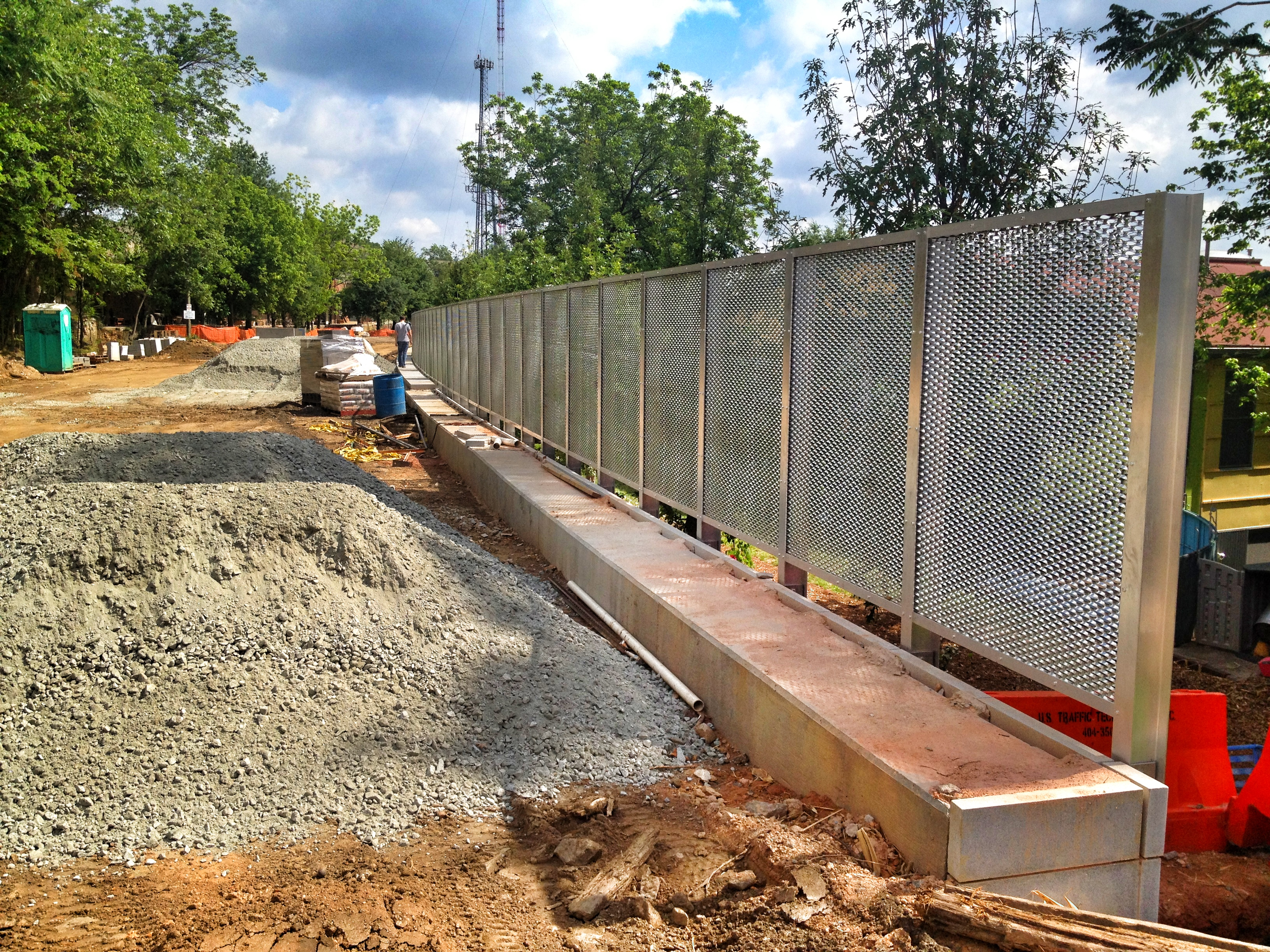
Beltline Eastside Trail under construction at Irwin Street in the Old Fourth Ward, May 2012.
