= Atlanta Assembly =

US assembly plant

Coordinates: 33°39′2.78″N 84°24′6.60″W

Atlanta Assembly Plant
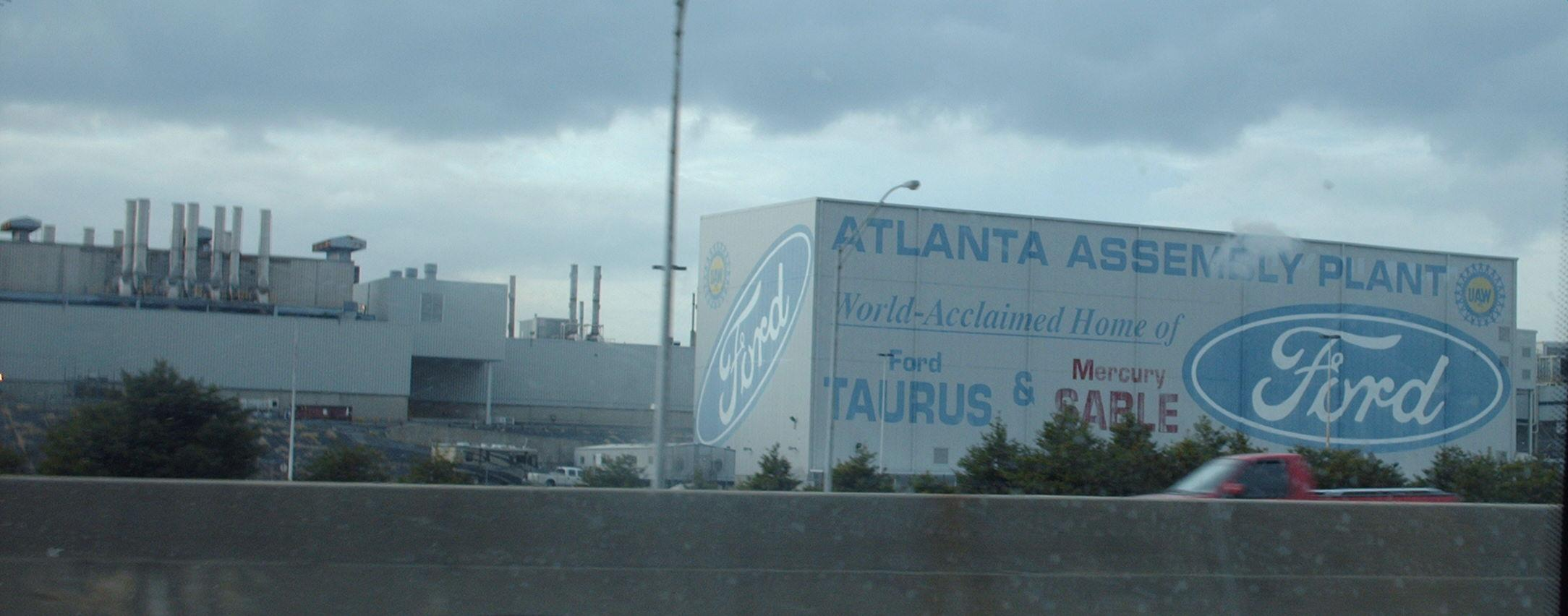
- Former Atlanta Assembly plant photographed on I-75 in Hapeville, Georgia, on January 12, 2007
- Operated: 1947–2006
- Location: Hapeville, Georgia, United States
- Industry: Automotive
- Products: Ford Taurus
- Owner: Ford Motor Company

Atlanta Assembly was an automobile factory owned by the Ford Motor Company in Hapeville, Georgia. The Atlanta Assembly plant was opened on December 1, 1947. Harbour Consulting rated it as the most efficient auto plant in North America in 2006. As part of The Way Forward plan, the plant was closed on October 27, 2006. Prior to the operation of this assembly plant, Ford operated another assembly plant and offices on Ponce de Leon Avenue near the old Sears headquarters building, in the Poncey-Highland neighborhood just northeast of Downtown Atlanta.

== Car lines produced ==
The last car lines built at the plant were:

- 1986–2007 Ford Taurus
- 1986–2005 Mercury Sable

Other car lines built at the plant included: Ford Fairlane, Ford Fairmont, Ford Falcon, Ford Galaxie, Ford Granada, Ford LTD, Ford Ranchero, Ford Thunderbird, Ford Torino, Mercury Cougar, Mercury Marquis, Mercury Montego and Mercury Zephyr.

== Closing in 2006 ==
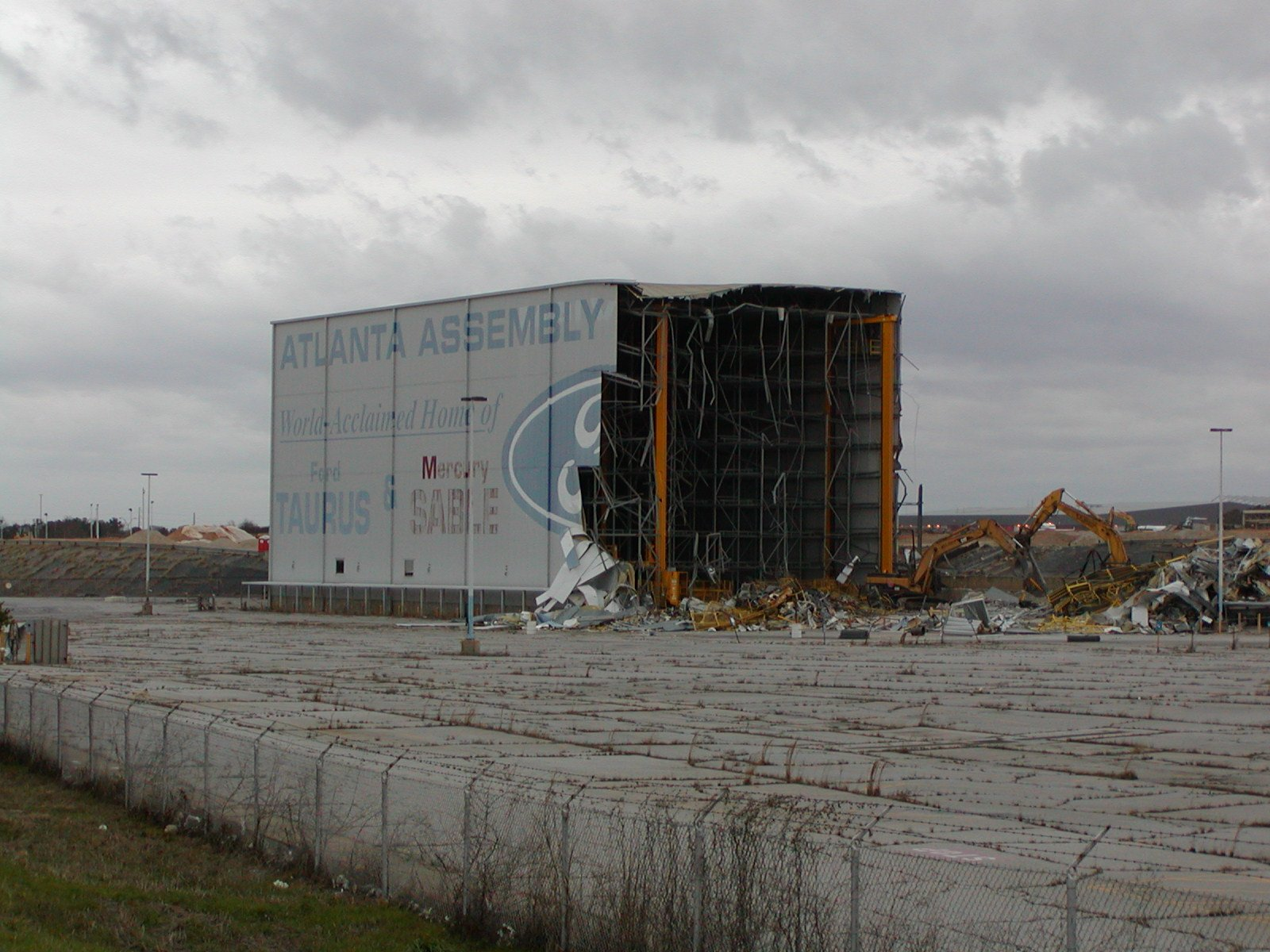
Ford Taurus Assembly Plant, Hapeville Ga, February 2009

The plant closed in 2006 and the site was purchased for over $40 million by Jacoby Development, Inc., in June 2008. Demolition began in August 2008 and took approximately one year.

== New location use ==
The site is expected to be used for the Aerotropolis Atlanta 6,500,000-square-foot (600,000 m^{2}) "multi use" community of retail, office, and hotel developments as well as additional parking for the adjacent Hartsfield-Jackson International Airport.

On May 11, 2011 Porsche Cars North America announced plans to move their headquarters from the northern Atlanta suburb of Sandy Springs to Aerotropolis Atlanta. The complex includes a new office building and test track.

== See also ==
- List of Ford factories
