= Timeline of the BeltLine =

This is the timeline of the development of the Beltline, a ring of trails and parks around central Atlanta.

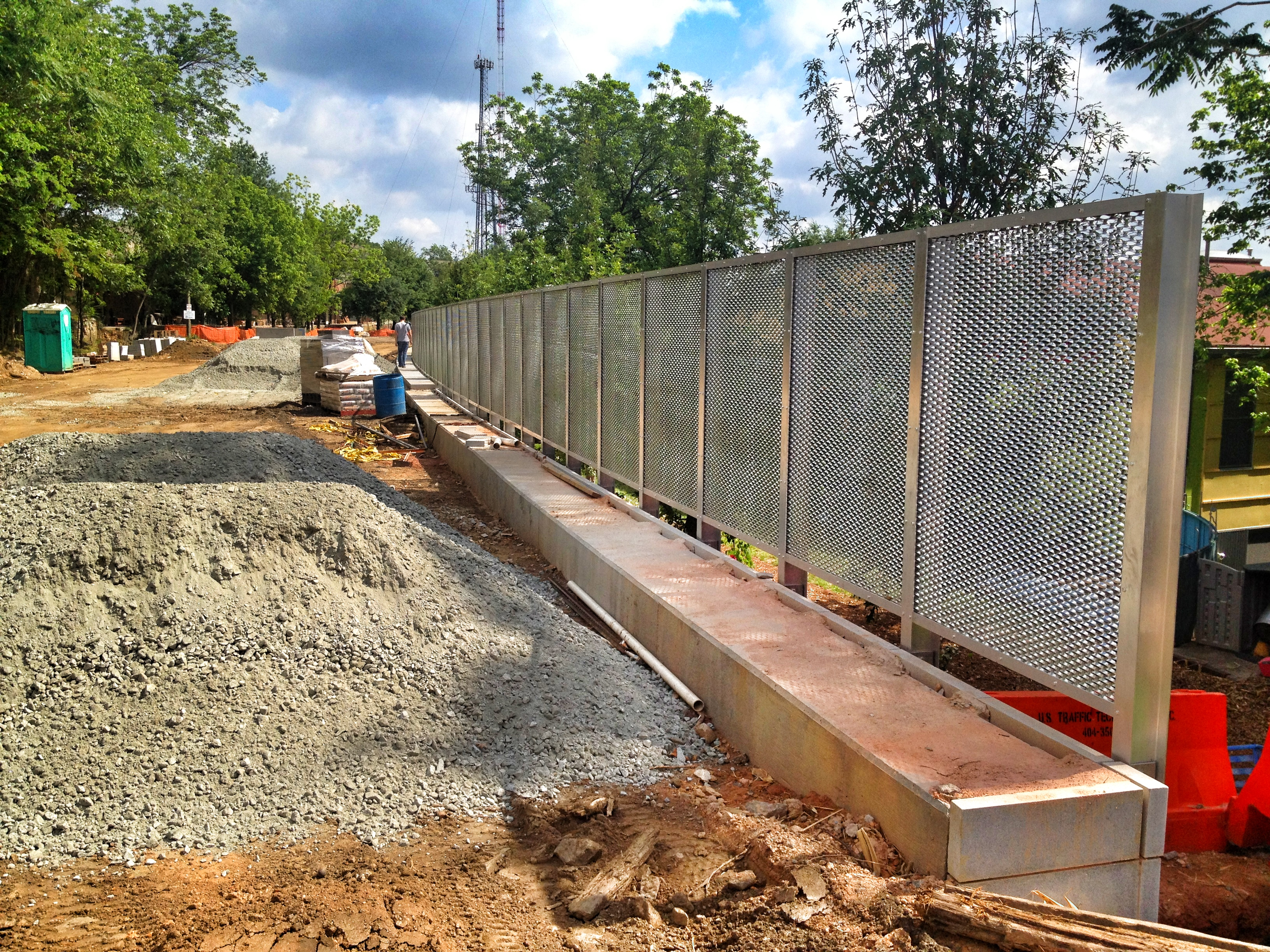
Construction of the Beltline Eastside Trail in 2012

- Atlanta City Council adopts the "1993 Parks, Open Space and Greenway Trails Plan," which includes a "cultural ring" of parks and trails along most of the route of the current Beltline.
- 1999 Ryan Gravel's master's thesis proposes a light-rail loop along the "belt" rail lines that circle the inner city.
- 2003 Georgia Tech senior design project is first feasibility study done on the Beltline and presented to the Atlanta City Council. The study included the first public support analysis which showed overwhelming public support for the project.
- 2004 Trust for Public Land publishes Alexander Garvin's Emerald Necklace proposal
- 2005
  - July — Atlanta Beltline Partnership formed
  - November 7 — city council approves Tax-allocation district and Redevelopment Area (14–3)
  - December 12 — Atlanta school board unanimously approves TAD. However, in 2006 the state Supreme Court later rules that schools' participation in a TAD is unconstitutional.
  - December 21 — Fulton County Commission approves TAD(5–1)
- 2006
  - April 19 — Fulton County Commission approves (5–2) sale of Bellwood Quarry for Westside Park.
  - July — Atlanta Beltline, Inc. (ABI) was formed by Invest Atlanta and the Five Year Work Plan was adopted by City Council.
  - September 21 — developer Wayne Mason who owns the 5-mile (8 km) northeast segment (from DeKalb Ave up through Ansley Park) withdrew his rezoning applications from the city. Mason, a suburban land speculator, had purchased the railroad right-of-way from Norfolk Southern in 2004. Rather than preserving the property as a greenway and transit corridor, Mason proposed a deal with the city whereby he would give a portion of his land in exchange for the right to develop the remainder at extremely high densities. The most controversial component of his plan was a proposal to build 38- and 39-story condominiums on the eastern edge of Piedmont Park, in an area dominated by historic single family homes. Mason's proposal galvanized the adjacent neighborhoods to organize, forming the Beltline Neighbors Coalition. Despite paid lobbying on Mason's behalf by such heavyweights as former Governor Roy Barnes, in the end the city held firm with the original intention of preserving the corridor as transit and greenspace.
  - December 11 — After soliciting comments from the public, MARTA recommends rail service (including either modern streetcar or light rail technology) for the corridor, even though bus rapid transit technology would have possible lower capital costs.
- 2007
  - January — The Atlanta Beltline Affordable Housing Advisory Board (BAHAB) was established.
  - February — The Beltline overlay district is approved, rezoning the area to steer development near the Beltline.
  - March — The Atlanta Beltline Tax Allocation District Advisory Committee (TADAC) was established.
  - March — Master planning and community engagement commenced, consistent with the Citizen Participation Framework adopted by City Council.
  - June 13 — city of Atlanta purchases over 21 acres (8.5 ha) near Grant Park for part of the "jewel" called Boulevard Crossing in the Emerald Necklace study.
  - August 7 — Atlanta Beltline Inc acquires the first section of the corridor. In partnership with Ben Raney and Barry Real Estate Companies, ABI announces the purchases of the NE section of the Atlanta Beltline from developers Wayne and Keith Mason.
  - November 12 — $8 million allocated to purchase land where North Avenue crosses the Beltline for a 16-acre (6.5 ha) park (which can later be expanded to 35 acres (14 ha)).
- 2008
  - February 23 — 150 people attended a community groundbreaking for the West End (Atlanta) trail at Rose Circle Park.
  - Summer — MARTA and the Federal Transit Administration, in partnership with ABI, commenced the Tier 1 Environmental Impact Statement, to make the project competitive for future federal transit funding.
  - October 15 — Groundbreaking takes place for the Historic Fourth Ward Park on North Avenue, the first part of the Beltline.
  - October — West End Trail Phase I (1.5 miles or 2.4 km), built by the PATH Foundation, opened in southwest Atlanta — enhanced by Trees Atlanta's Atlanta Beltline arboretum. Atlanta Beltline renovated Gordon White Park.
  - October — Atlanta Beltline Affordable Housing Trust Fund policies adopted by City Council. First Atlanta Beltline TAD Bonds issued, totaling $64.5 million. The Atlanta Beltline Affordable Housing Trust Fund was capitalized with $8.8 million in TAD Bond proceeds.
  - November — A statewide referendum allows school districts to opt into a TAD, allowing APS to participate in the Beltline TAD.
- 2009
  - June — With the Atlanta Beltline TAD Advisory Committee, ABI developed and adopted an equitable development plan.
  - July — ABI entered an option agreement and a lease with GDOT for 3.5 miles (5.6 km) of the Atlanta Beltline corridor in the southwest and Reynoldstown.
  - December — Groundbreaking on the first trail occurs, where mayor-elect Kasim Reed announces he wants to make the Beltline a reality in 10 years, instead of 25.
- 2010
  - April — Opening ceremony for a 1-mile (1.6 km) segment of trail that snakes through Tanyard Creek Park, Louise G. Howard Park, and along Bobby Jones Golf Course.
  - May — Art on the Atlanta Beltline, first ever temporary public art exhibit on the Atlanta Beltline, opened to the public. The Atlanta Beltline Lantern Parade was born.
  - June 19 — $5 million donation from Kaiser Permanente and PATH to build graded hardscape from DeKalb Ave north to Ponce de Leon Ave to be completed within a year.
  - July — The West End Trail Phase II (1 mile) in southwest Atlanta, built by the PATH Foundation, opened to the public for a total of 2.5 miles (4.0 km).
  - October — ABI adopted Community Benefit Guiding Principles.
- 2011
  - May — D.H. Stanton Park re-opened to the public as an eight-acre (3.2 ha) park on the Atlanta Beltline corridor in southeast Atlanta.
  - June — Historic Fourth Ward Park and Skatepark (17 acres or 6.9 ha total) opened to the public.
  - September — Boulevard Crossing Park Phase I (5 acres or 2.0 ha) opened to the public.
  - September — Second annual Art on the Atlanta Beltline exhibit is held.
  - September — ABI acquired former Triumph Lofts development out of receivership to convert to affordable housing as the Lofts at Reynoldstown Crossing in southeast Atlanta.
  - December — ABI held first-ever drawing for 28 new affordable homes at the Lofts at Reynoldstown Crossing.
- 2012
  - April — The final of 10 Master Plans for the Atlanta Beltline planning area was adopted by Atlanta City Council, completing the 5-year citywide effort.
  - May — ABI and City of Atlanta Department of Parks, Recreation and Cultural Affairs opened the new splash pad in Perkerson Park in southwest Atlanta.
  - August — ABI Board of Directors adopted the Atlanta Beltline Environmental Justice Policy.
  - September — The Federal Transit Administration issued a Record of Decision for the Tier 1 Environmental Impact Statement — a critical step towards securing federal transit funding.
  - August — The then current CEO Brian Leary was forced to resign over amid controversy about the organization's reported use of taxpayer dollars to fund non-business expenses.
  - October 15 — The Eastside Trail opened to the public — the first section of trail to be built within the old railroad corridor.
- 2013
  - January — Groundbreaking ceremony for phase I of the Southwest Connector Trail.
  - March — Walking tours of the Atlanta Beltline Arboretum launched, spearheaded by Trees Atlanta.
  - May — A new path was dedicated in Lang Carson Park in Reynoldstown.
  - June — CEO Paul Morris started with Atlanta Beltline, Inc.
  - July — The dedicated Path Force police officers started patrolling all Atlanta Beltline parks and trails.
  - August — Phase I of the Southwest Connector Trail officially opened.
  - August — Atlanta Beltline, Inc. (ABI) entered into a services agreement with the City of Atlanta to advance key transportation projects that support the Atlanta Beltline's success.
  - September — The Atlanta Beltline received a federal TIGER V grant of $18 million to develop the southwest corridor of the Atlanta Beltline. The future Westside Trail will be a 2.5-mile (4.0 km) multi-use trail from Washington Park to University Avenue with 16 access points.
  - September — The Atlanta Beltline Lantern Parade attracted over 10,000 people to light up the night along the Eastside Trail.
  - November — The Atlanta Beltline Partnership launched free fitness classes along the Atlanta Beltline.
  - November — Atlanta Beltline Bike Tours began.
  - November — The Atlanta Beltline online shop officially opened.
- 2014
  - August 22 — Eastside Trail Gateway is opened by mayor Kasim Reed. It connects Historic Fourth Ward Park to the Beltline at 33.7690541°N 84.3636233°W.
- 2017
  - April 28 — Eastside Trail at Irwin opens with traffic table ramps in preparation of opening section from Irwin to DeKalb Avenue
  - September — Eastside Trail Wylie east from Krog Street tunnel completed and open (0.4 miles) including traffic diet of street, shade tree plantings and signage.
  - September 29 — Westside Trail from University Ave to Lena Ave (3 miles) officially opens, work began in 2014
  - October 17 — Last 13 acres of the northeast trail secured from Norfolk Southern
  - October 23 — Eastside Trail between Edgewood and Irwin (0.3 miles)
- 2018
  - March 15 — City announces the purchase of 4 miles rail corridor from CSX that will become the Southside Trail, connecting the Eastside and Westside trails.
- 2019
  - September — The James M. Cox Foundation gave $6 Million to the PATH Foundation which will connect the Silver Comet Trail to The Atlanta Beltline.
- 2020
  - July 8 — Eastside Trail Gateway is closed for construction to be replaced with a staircase and elevator.

== Forthcoming ==
- GDOT approval of the following Beltline multi-use path projects (See p. 99)
  - AR-450A $20 million (35% federal dollars) 2007 (includes $17 million for ROW)
  - AR-450B Bicycle/pedestrian 2008 $19 million (58% federal)
  - AR-450B Bicycle/pedestrian 2020 $15 million (100% city of Atlanta)
