= The Bridge (sculpture) =

- Artist: Thornton Dial.
- Year: 1997
- Medium: Steel
- Movement: Sculpture
- Subject: John Lewis
- Location: Atlanta; 33.765077°N 84.358338°W

The Bridge is a 1997 sculpture by Thornton Dial. It is located at John Lewis Plaza in Freedom Park in Atlanta, Georgia at the intersection of Ponce de Leon Avenue with Freedom Parkway in the Poncey-Highland neighborhood. The work portrays "congressman John Lewis' lifelong quest for civil and human rights" and the community's "valiant efforts to stop the road and preserve intown neighborhoods".

== See also ==
- Selma to Montgomery marches
- Civil rights movement in popular culture
