= Telephone Factory Lofts =

- Western Electric Company Building
- U.S. National Register of Historic Places
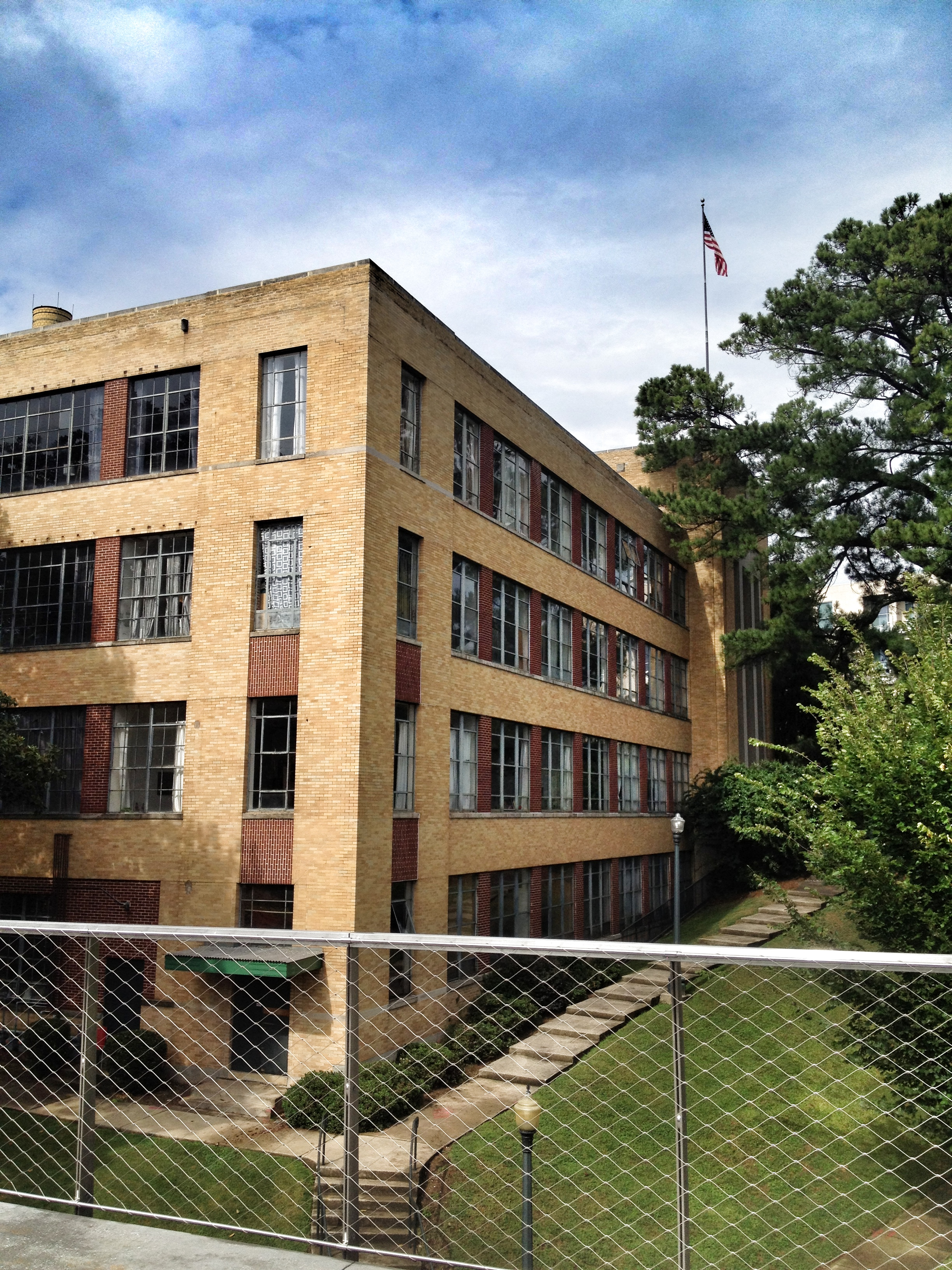

- Location within Atlanta
- Location: 820 Ralph McGill Blvd., Poncey-Highland, Atlanta, Georgia
- Coordinates: 33.768098°N 84.360301°W
- Built: 1938
- Architectural style: Modern Movement: Moderne; Art Deco
- NRHP reference No.: 00001329
- Added to NRHP: November 8, 2000

The Telephone Factory Lofts is a mixed-use loft building along the BeltLine trail in the Poncey-Highland neighborhood of Atlanta. It is listed on the National Register of Historic Places as the Western Electric Company Building.

== Layout ==
The main entrance is via a 75-foot (23 m)-high Art Deco-style tower. There is a four-story main building, which once housed the factory floor, offices and cafeteria, as well as a single-story building, formerly a warehouse that housed the shipping and receiving areas of the factory. There are 66 loft units ranging from 750 square feet (70 m^{2}) to 10,000 square feet (930 m^{2}).

== History ==
=== Western Electric factory and repair center ===
The building was constructed in 1938 and was a Western Electric Co. factory that manufactured and repaired telephones and switchboard systems that were owned by the Bell System and rented out to customers.

=== Conversion to lofts ===
In 1995, developers Rhodes and David Perdue decided to convert the building to lofts. They applied for bond financing from the Atlanta Development Authority (ADA), the city's development arm. As a condition of providing the financing, the ADA required, as part of an affordable housing program, that one-fifth of the units be made available for people earning 50% of the area median income, ($25,000 per year) or less. The lofts opened in 1996, and for fifteen years through 2011, units were offered as living and work space to artists, writers and designers at inexpensive prices under the program. In 2011, the units were transitioned to market rates. Upon conclusion of leases, occupants had to sign new contracts at the much higher market rates if they wished to stay.

This Western Electric building should not be confused with the demolished 1921 Western Electric Company building which stood at 117-123 Walton Street NW in Downtown Atlanta.
