= Ford Motor Company Assembly Plant (Atlanta) =

- U.S. National Register of Historic Places
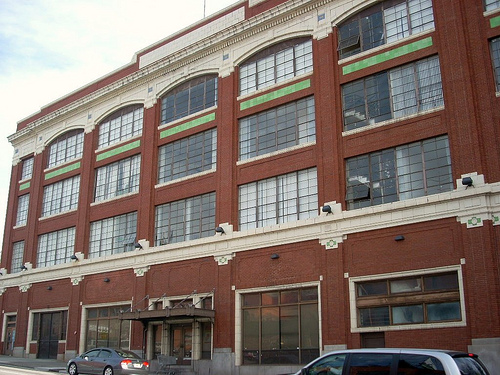

- Location within Atlanta Location within Georgia Location within the United States
- Location: Atlanta, Georgia
- Coordinates: 33°46′22″N 84°21′52″W
- Built: 1914
- Architect: John Graham
- NRHP reference No.: 84001080
- Added to NRHP: May 10, 1984

The Ford Motor Company Assembly Plant at 699 Ponce de Leon Avenue in the Poncey-Highland neighborhood of Atlanta, Georgia was the headquarters of the Ford Motor Company's southeastern US operations from 1915 to 1942. As a result of good sales in Atlanta, and a desire to decentralize production, Ford established a combined assembly, sales, service and administration facility on Ponce de Leon Avenue, selling a peak of 22,000 vehicles per year. The assembly plant produced Model Ts, Model As and V-8s until 1942, when the plant was sold to the War Department and a new plant was opened in the Atlanta suburb of Hapeville.

The 150,000 square feet (14,000 m^{2}) building was designed by Ford's in-house architect, John Graham. An office block in the front was backed by a multi-story loft-style assembly plant.

The War Department used the building as a storage depot and as administrative offices. Sold for development in 1979, the building is now known as Ford Factory Square or the Ford Factory Lofts and is occupied by apartments and retail shops. Architects for the adaptive reuse project were Bradfield Associates.

The Kroger supermarket at the Ford Factory is inspiration for the meme Murder Kroger.

== Photo gallery ==
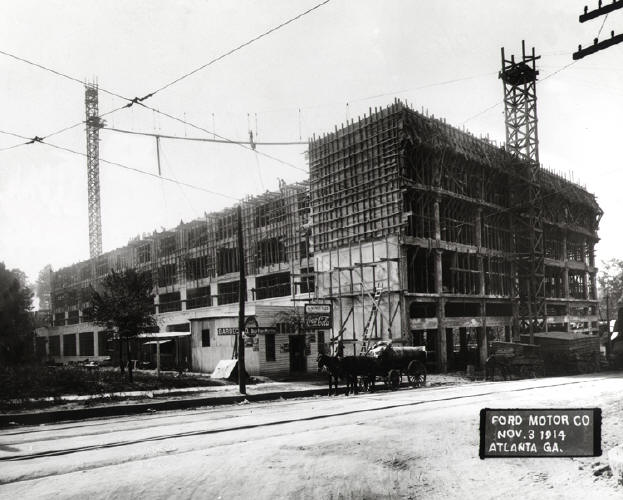
Ford Factory under construction 1914

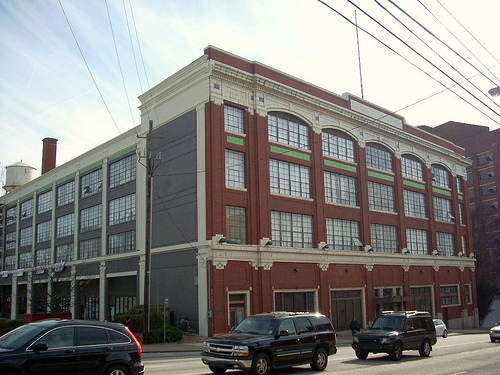
Front and side view of the Ford Assembly Plant from Ponce de Leon Avenue

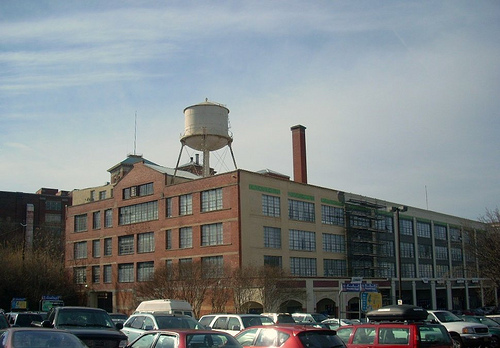
Back and side view of the plant

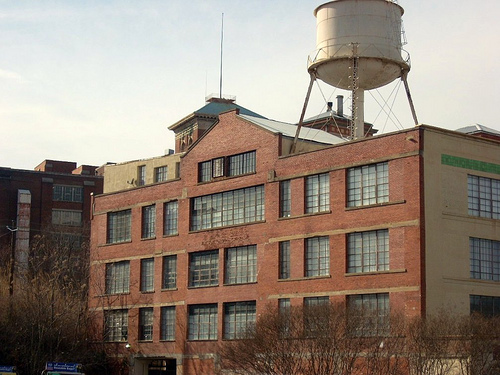
Close-up view of the back of the plant; Ponce City Market (formerly the Sears building, then City Hall East) in background

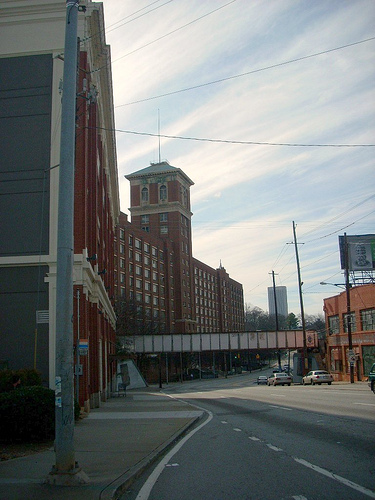
Side view of plant entrance fronting Ponce de Leon Avenue; Sears building (with tower) in background

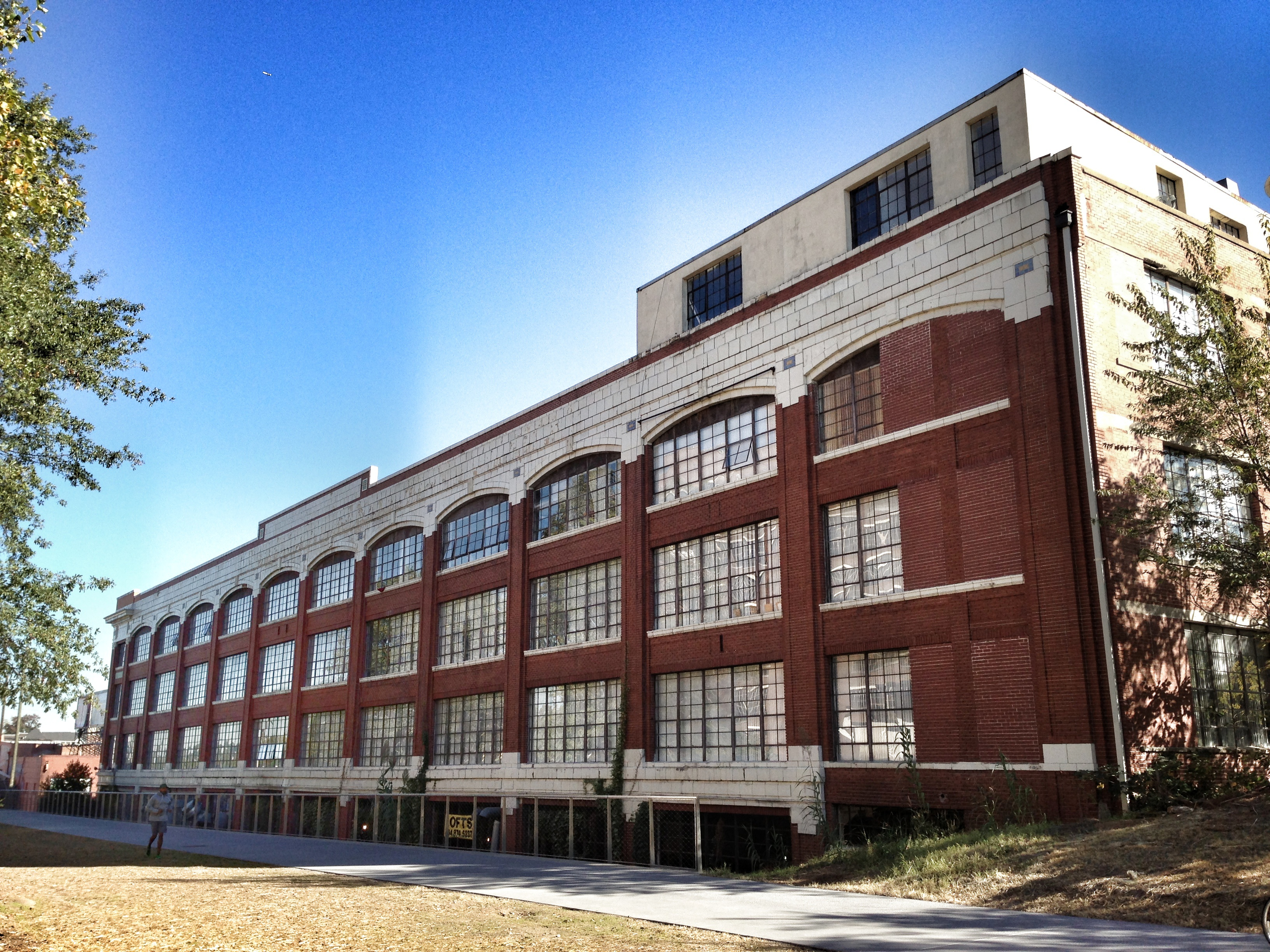
East side of Ford Factory Lofts seen from the BeltLine trail, 2012
