= Freedom Park (Atlanta, Georgia) =

Park in Atlanta, Georgia

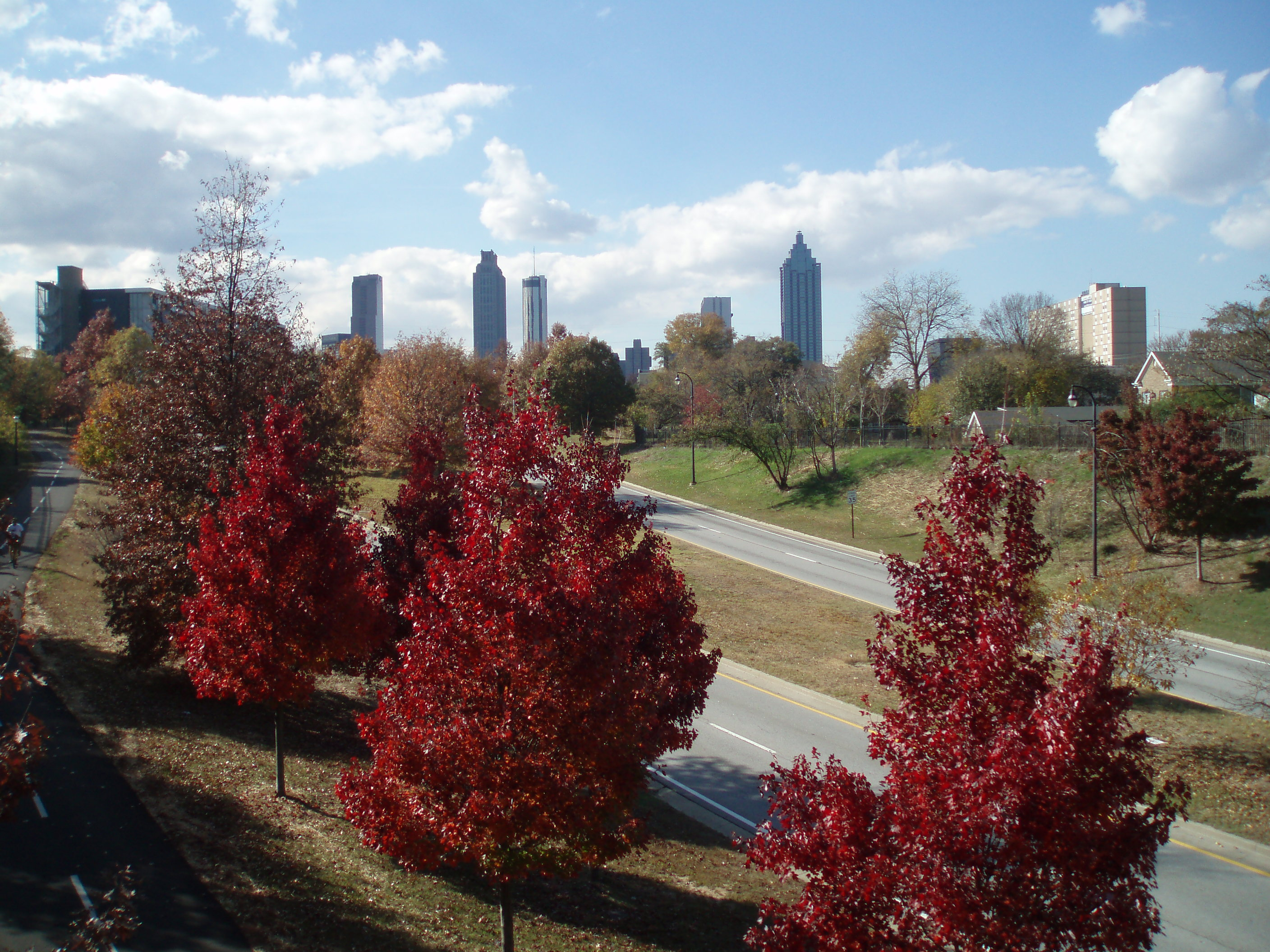
- John Lewis Freedom Parkway passing through Freedom Park
- Interactive map of Freedom Park
- Type: Linear park, city park
- Location: Atlanta, Georgia, U.S.
- Coordinates: 33.765077°N 84.358338°W
- Area: 207 acres (83.8 ha)
- Opened: September 19, 2000
- Operator: Atlanta Department of Parks and Recreation
- Status: Open all year
- Website: www.freedompark.org

Freedom Park is one of the largest city parks in Atlanta, Georgia, United States. The park forms a cross shape with the axes crossing at the Carter Center. The park stretches west-east from Parkway Drive, just west of Boulevard, to the intersection with the north-south BeltLine Eastside Trail, to Candler Park, and north-south from Ponce de Leon Avenue to the Inman Park/Reynoldstown MARTA station.

Freedom Parkway, rededicated John Lewis Freedom Parkway in 2018 in honor of local U.S. Congressman and civil rights icon John Lewis, is a four-lane limited-access road. It is the westernmost portion of Georgia State Route 10 (SR 10). It travels through the park west-to-east from the Downtown Connector to the Carter Center, where the main road turns north towards Ponce de Leon Avenue, with a branch continuing east towards Moreland Avenue.

== History ==
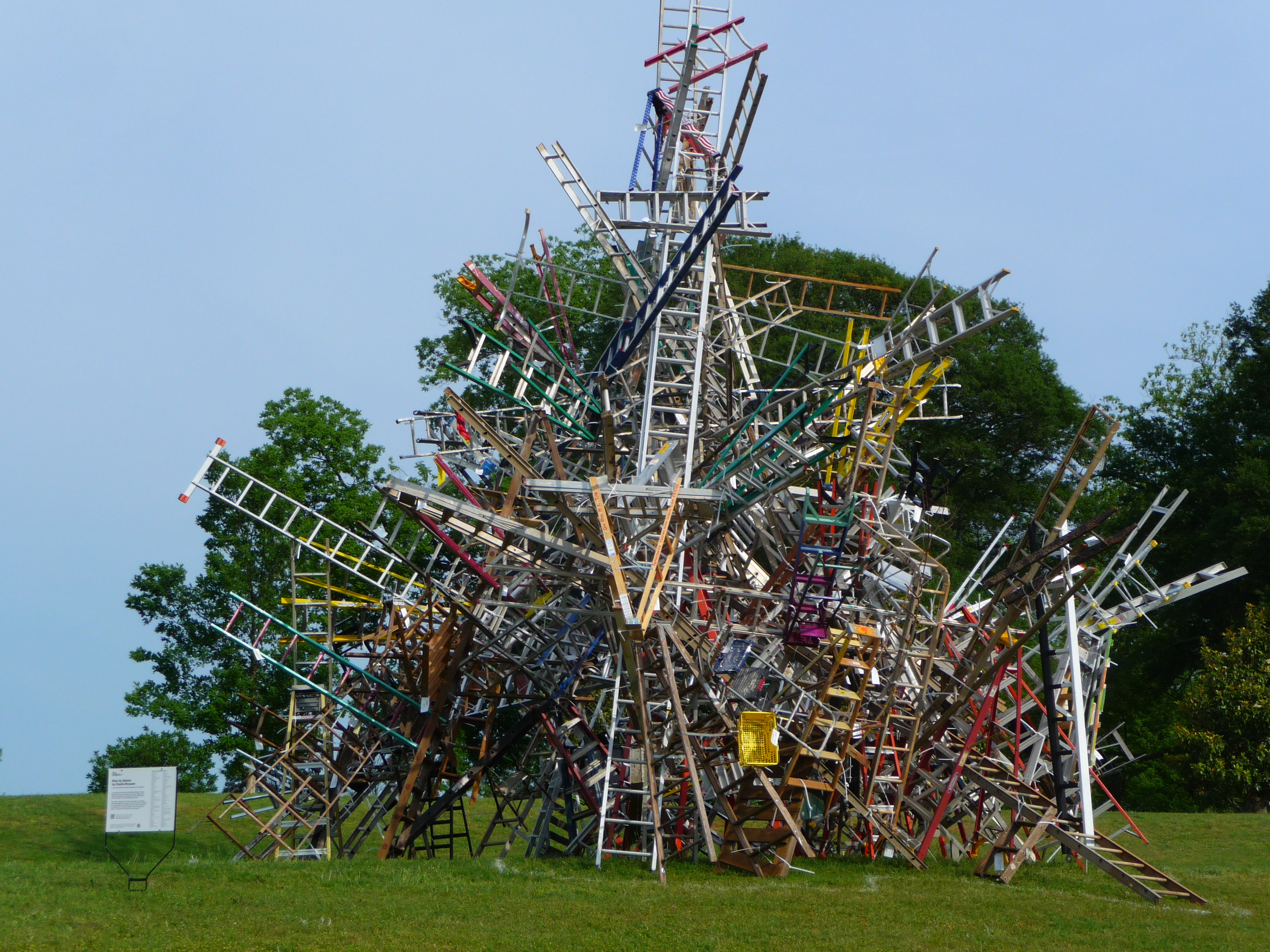
Rise Up Atlanta by Charlie Brouwer, was a temporary sculpture made of ladders erected in Freedom Park

In the 1960s, the Georgia Department of Transportation began acquiring land for two east-side freeways. The north-south route would have cut north from I-20 through Virginia-Highland, creating an interchange at I-85 and continuing north as what is now SR 400. The east-west route (part of which is now Freedom Parkway) would run east from the Downtown Connector (I-75/85) to the Stone Mountain Expressway. A cloverleaf interchange for the two was to be atop the prominent hill where the neighborhood of Copenhill was demolished, and where the Jimmy Carter Library and Museum and Carter Center now stands. The east-west portion from Downtown to Copenhill and the north south portion from Copenhill north to the I-85/SR 400 interchange, was to carry the interstate number I-485.

Through purchases and eminent domain, the GDOT assembled much of the central portion of the project land, and had already demolished 500 homes when local protests and lawsuits, and Governor Jimmy Carter finally stopped the project in the 1970s.

That land sat vacant and overgrowing with kudzu for more than 20 years. Shortly after the 1990 selection of Atlanta for the 1996 Olympic Games, Mayor Maynard Jackson brokered a solution allowing the current parkway to be completed out to Ponce de Leon Avenue to the north and Moreland Avenue to the east. The strip of land further to the east, and land along the new parkway segment, was converted into a linear park with the help of PATH. The 207-acre (84-hectare) Freedom Park was officially dedicated on September 19, 2000, with ribbon cutters Jimmy Carter, then-current Governor Roy Barnes, and Mayor Bill Campbell. Since then it has hosted a number of outdoor sculpture displays and is a popular jogging, bike riding, and dog-walking park.

With the 2012 opening of the BeltLine's busy Eastside Trail, which crosses the Freedom Park Trail just west of the Carter Center, the trail became connected to the large citywide BeltLine ring of parks and trails.

In August 2018, "Freedom Parkway" was renamed to "John Lewis Freedom Parkway" in honor of U.S. Rep. John Lewis, a longtime (1961 Freedom Riders, 1963 March on Washington for Jobs and Freedom, 1965 Selma to Montgomery marches) leader of the civil rights movement.

== Geography ==
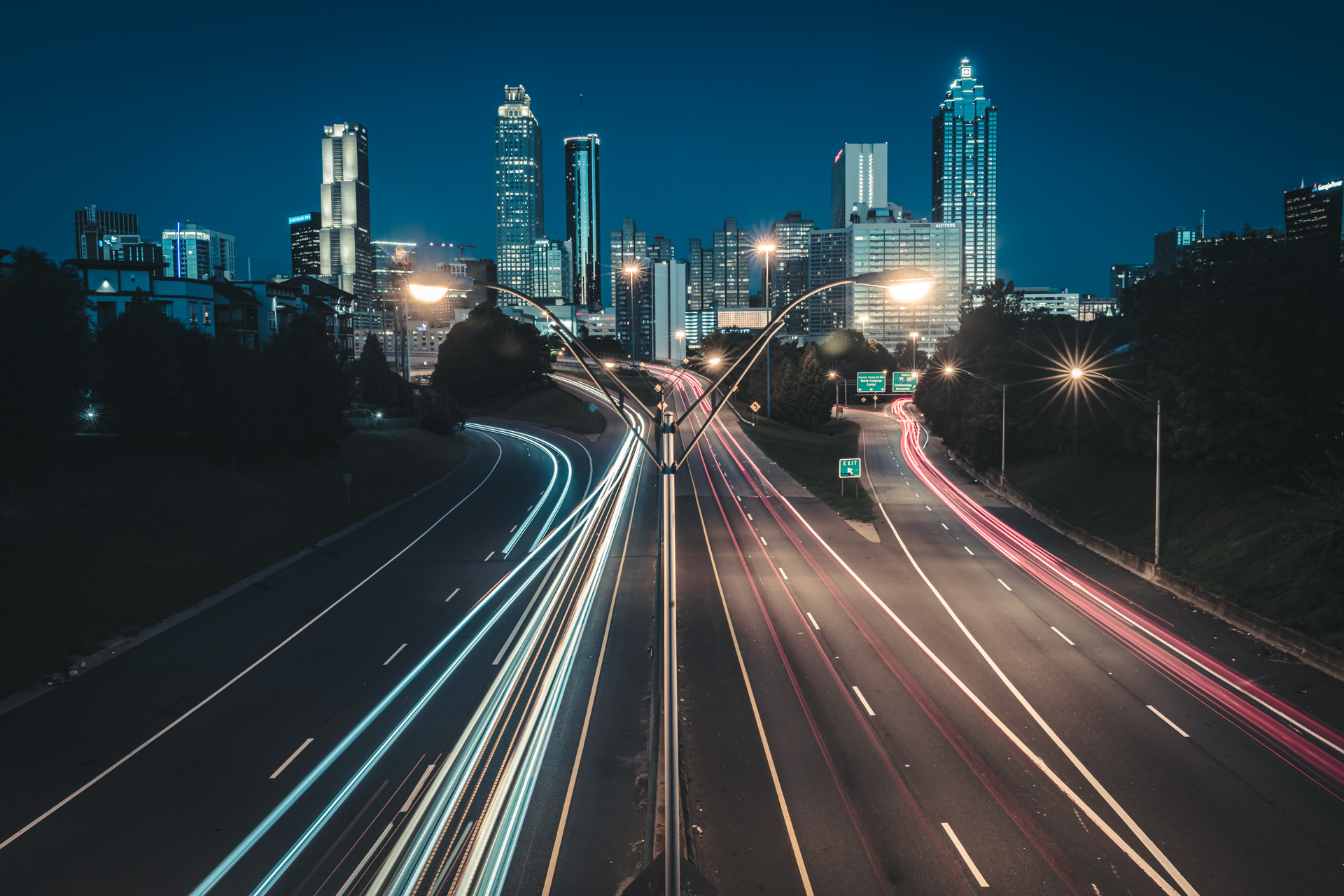
Freedom Parkway interchange with Downtown Connector as seen from the Jackson Street bridge, a popular photo opportunity point seen in many iconic shots

The main portion of John Lewis Freedom Parkway, running east from an oversized interchange with the Downtown Connector (I-75/85) and then north at the Carter Center to Ponce de Leon Avenue (US 29/US 78/US 278/SR 8), is numbered and signed as SR 10. The "John Lewis Freedom Parkway East" portion running around and to the east of the Carter Center is SR 42 Connector, linking it to Moreland Avenue (US 23/SR 42, and the Fulton/DeKalb county line) just north of Little Five Points. This area is considered part of Poncey-Highland, one of the neighborhoods of Atlanta.

This portion around the Carter Center consists of two one-way streets. Eastbound, Copenhill Avenue begins as exit ramps from SR 10 northbound and southbound, then curving northward and becoming two-way as Cleburne Avenue at the northeast corner of the library property. Westbound traffic is carried along the north side on Williams Mill Road, which then becomes two-way Ralph McGill Boulevard at a surface intersection with SR 10. Freedom Parkway East continues east of North Highland Avenue as Vaud Avenue, before ending about 1,000 feet (300 m) later at Moreland.

The radio tower located immediately adjacent to the road just southwest of the Carter Center is that of WSB-TV 32 (2.1/2.2). While it appears that the "tunnel" the parkway travels through at this point is an unused overpass for a never-built road, this underpass is actually to prevent ice from falling onto the roadway or onto cars during or after a winter storm. Falling ice could occur with gusty north and northwest winds from the tower itself, but one of the tower's three sets of guy wires also runs directly over the road.

== Public art ==
Public art displayed along Freedom Parkway includes Homage to King, a 1996 sculpture by Barcelona artist Xavier Medina-Campeny (a gift from the Spanish host city of the 1992 Summer Olympics to the host of the 1996 Summer Olympics) at the corner of Boulevard, which portrays Martin Luther King Jr. with outstretched arm, welcoming those visiting the Martin Luther King Jr. National Historical Park. The Bridge, 1997, by Thornton Dial, at Ponce de Leon Avenue, portrays congressman John Lewis' "lifelong quest for civil and human rights" and the community's "valiant efforts" to stop the construction of freeways and preserve intown neighborhoods".

In 1984 Steve Williams started documenting the Presidential Parkway as the construction started resulting in a show and a model built of Freedom Park in the City Hall Atrium after the compromise was reached in 1991. This show was supported by a grant by the City of Atlanta Bureau of Cultural Affairs and the Dept of Planning. More grants were awarded to support the work and other events were covered in the park such as Art in Freedom Park in 2005, a summer long arts festival of sculpture, music and performance and Naked Freedom 2003–2006 a naked frolic in the park. Other art created for the park is Decade: 1992 and 2002 are a series of photographs, with the original model of the park, sponsored by Don Bender showing the change of the land from 1992 to 2002 on display in the Point Center Building in Little 5 Points. Decades:1992, 2002, 2012 is currently on display throughout Freedom Park showing the change from 1992 to present day at the site they were taken.
