= Amsterdam Walk =

Mixed-use development in Atlanta, Georgia

Coordinates: 33°47′19.03″N 84°22′7.92″W

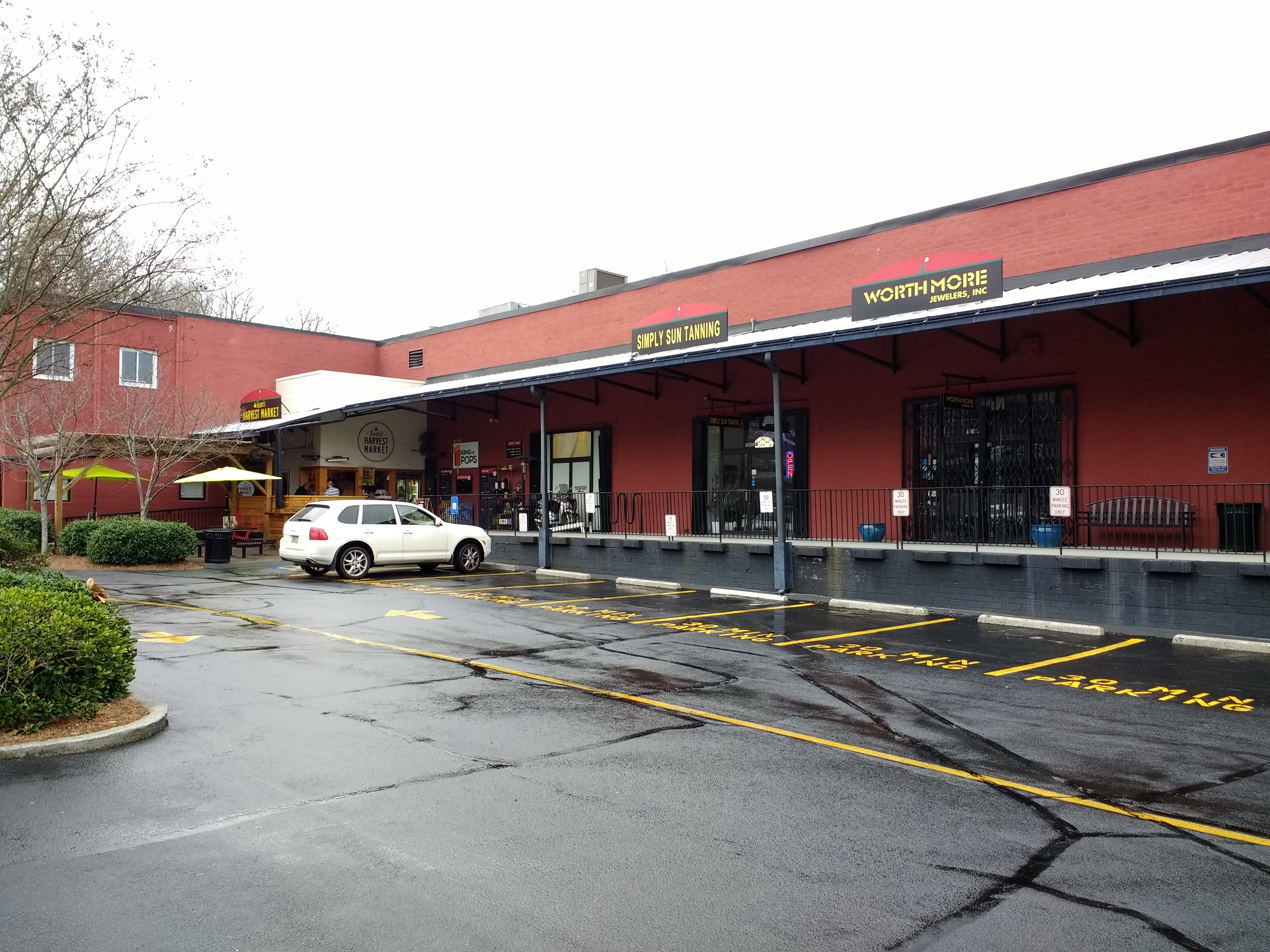
Amsterdam Walk

Amsterdam Walk is a mixed-use development in the Virginia Highland neighborhood of Atlanta, Georgia. It is housed in former warehouse space located at the far west end of Amsterdam Ave. between Monroe Ave. and the Beltline. There is a large gym, bars, nightclubs, and specialty retailers selling furniture, jewelry, clothing, floral design, antiques, baked goods, cooking accessories, rugs and more.

== History ==
Amsterdam Walk consists of buildings that originally housed the Campbell Coal Company warehouses. However, the Campbell complex was actually larger than today's Amsterdam Walk. It also included an area to the north which is now empty land. That area used to house The Cove nightclub, but later the buildings were razed and it is now scheduled to be developed as the Piedmont Gardens section of Piedmont Park.

The Campbell warehouse later became the Thoben Elrod appliance depot, which caught on fire in 1964 with losses of $646,000.

In the 1990s the part that is now Amsterdam Walk opened as the Midtown Outlets, and was given its current name in the early 2000s.
