= Ponce City Market =

Mixed-use development in Atlanta, Georgia

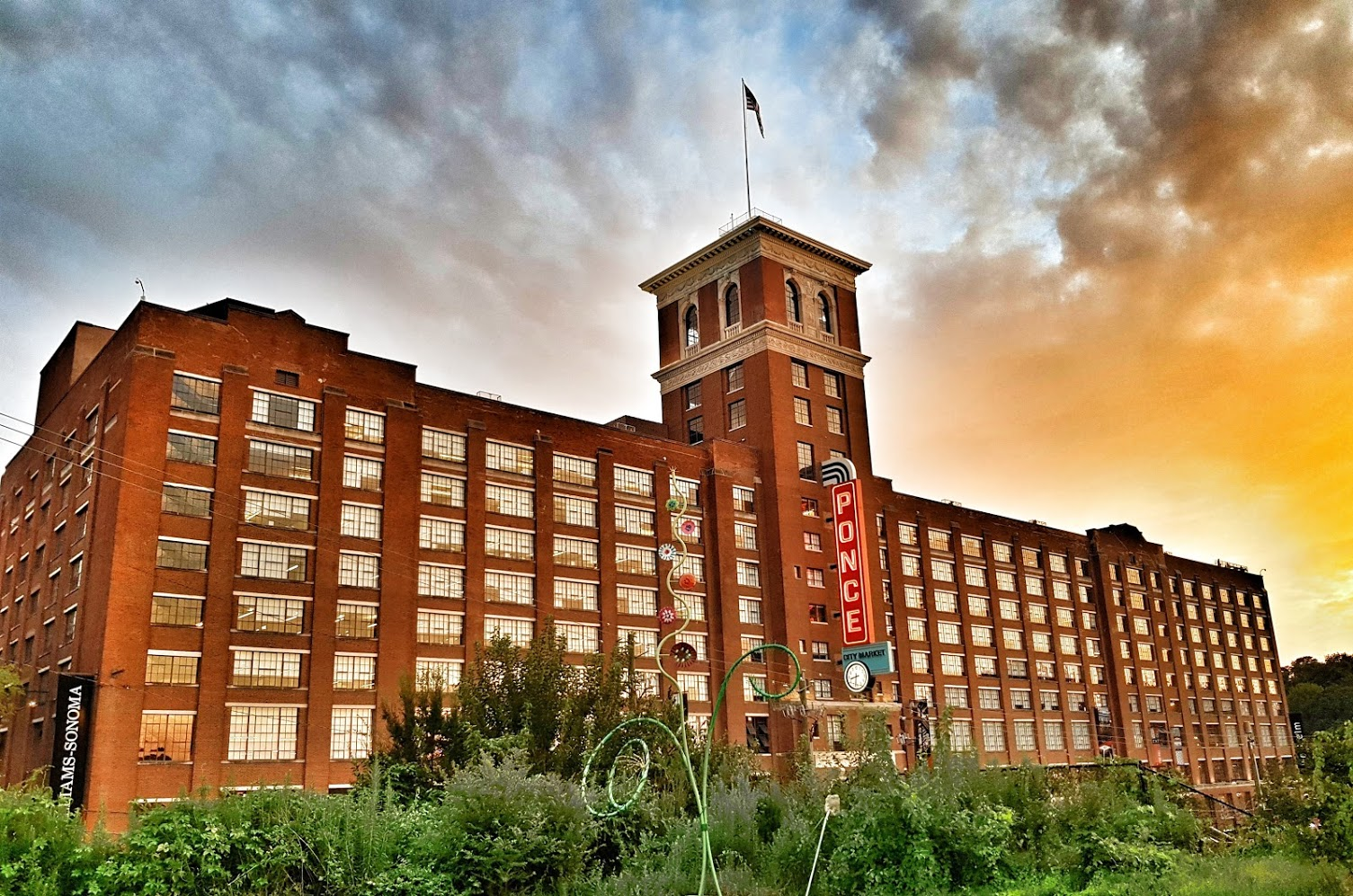
- Ponce City Market under renovation in January 2013
- Interactive map of the Ponce City Market area
- Former names: Sears, Roebuck and Co. Mail-Order Warehouse and Retail Store; City Hall East

General information
- Type: Mixed-use development
- Architectural style: Colonial Revival architecture
- Location: 675 Ponce de Leon Ave. NE, Atlanta, Georgia, United States
- Coordinates: 33.7729°N 84.3657°W
- Completed: 1926
- Renovated: 2011–2014
- Owner: Jamestown L.P.

Technical details
- Floor area: 2.1 million square feet (200,000 m^{2})

Design and construction
- Architecture firm: Nimmons, Carr and Wright, Architects (Chicago)

Website
- poncecitymarket.com

U.S. National Register of Historic Places
- Official name: Sears, Roebuck and Co. Mail-Order Warehouse and Retail Store
- Designated: November 15, 2016
- Reference no.: 16000769

Ponce City Market is a mixed-use development located in a former Sears catalogue facility in Atlanta, with national and local retail anchors, restaurants, a food hall, boutiques and offices, and residential units. It is located adjacent to the intersection of the BeltLine with Ponce de Leon Avenue in the Old Fourth Ward near Virginia Highland, Poncey-Highland and Midtown neighborhoods. The 2.1-million-square-foot (200,000 m^{2}) building, one of the largest by volume in the Southeast United States, was used by Sears, Roebuck and Co. from 1926 to 1987 and later by the City of Atlanta as "City Hall East". The building's lot covers 16 acres (65,000 m^{2}). Ponce City Market officially opened on August 25, 2014. It was listed on the National Register of Historic Places in 2016.

== Occupants ==
The complex contains offices, apartments, a gourmet food hall, retail stores, educational facilities, and a rooftop amusement park.

Larger retail stores include Anthropologie, Citizen Supply, J. Crew, Williams Sonoma, and West Elm. Ponce City Market states that its food hall is similar to the famous Chelsea Market, New York City, formerly owned by Jamestown. James Beard-awarded chefs with presence in the food hall include Anne Quatrano of Bacchanalia/Star Provisions, Linton Hopkins of Restaurant Eugene, and Sean Brock of Charleston, S.C.'s Husk restaurant.

Prominent office occupants include the parent company of the global marketing platform service MailChimp, Pinterest, Rocket Science Group, FanDuel and the educational website HowStuffWorks.

== History ==
=== Origins ===
The building was built on the site of Ponce de Leon Springs, later the Ponce de Leon amusement park.

=== As Sears, Roebuck ===
- From 1926 to 1979, it was a Sears, Roebuck and Co. retail store, warehouse and regional office. The Atlanta regional headquarters was closely linked to Sears' efforts to capture the market of Southern farmers through the Sears Agricultural Foundation:
  - From August 1926 until October 1928, the Foundation hosted a radio show, broadcast from the Atlanta Sears tower called "Dinner Bell R.F.D.". R.F.D. stood for the club "Radio Farmers' Democracy. The show aired on WSB radio between noon and 1 pm three times a week, featuring old-time musicians and string bands
  - Sears held a farmer's market at the back of the property starting in May 1930 through New Year's Day 1947
  - In 1939, the market hosted the First Georgia Clay Products Show, which garnered an audience of 5,000
  - The market established partnerships with local 4-H Clubs and Future Farmers of America clubs
- In 1979, the retail store closed but the building continue operating as a Sears regional office until 1987.

=== As City Hall East ===
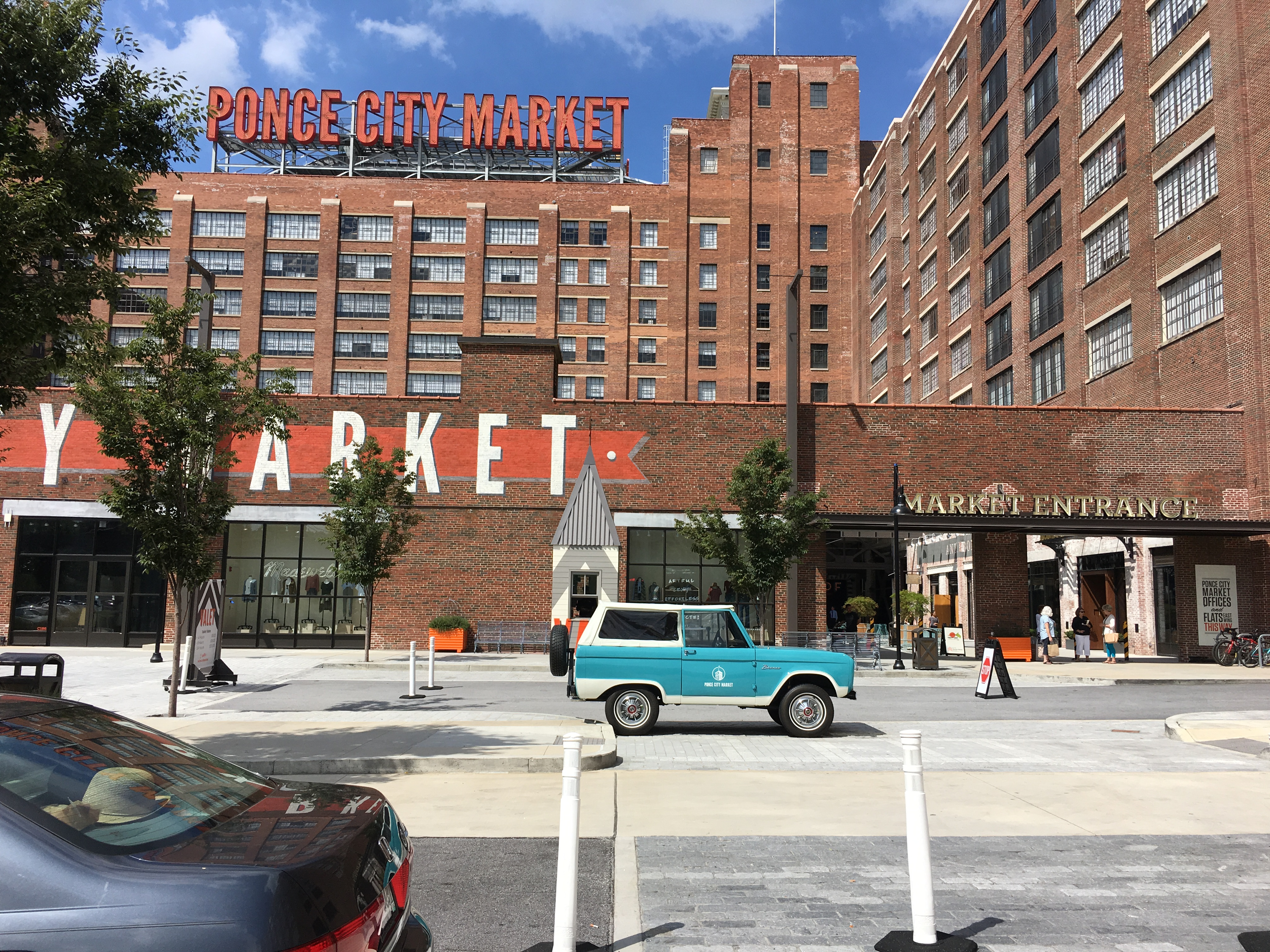
The entrance of Ponce City Market showing the large neon sign on the rooftop.

- In May 1990, the city of Atlanta bought the building for $12 million, with plans to place 2,000 police and fire employees there, and later rent space out to county, state, and federal agencies. The city subsequently moved the central offices of its police department and fire department into the building. A city-funded art gallery was also established on the first floor.
- From 1995 to 1999, the Southeastern Flower Show was held here.
- The building was closed to the public on March 29, 2010.

=== As Ponce City Market ===
The City sold the property for $27 million to Jamestown, a private-equity group, on July 11, 2011. Jamestown, which also invested in the redevelopment of the White Provision retail and restaurant complex in West Midtown, bankrolled the 180-million-dollar plans by developer Green Street Properties to convert it into a mixed-use development In a July 2011 interview, Michael Phillips, managing director of Jamestown, said that Jamestown is focused on Ponce City Market becoming the fourth nationally relevant food hall in the U.S., alongside Pike Place in Seattle, the Ferry Building in San Francisco, and Jamestown's own Chelsea Market in New York City. Jamestown also plans rooftop gardens where local restaurants can grow food. Jamestown planned to complete renovations by early 2015 and then have the building added to the National Register of Historic Places.

It was hoped that the new development, along with the new adjacent BeltLine trail and Historic Fourth Ward Park, would stitch together the four neighborhoods that meet where it is located and revitalize the Ponce de Leon Avenue corridor.

Ponce City Market officially opened on August 25, 2014.
