= Poncey–Highland =

- Neighborhoods of Atlanta
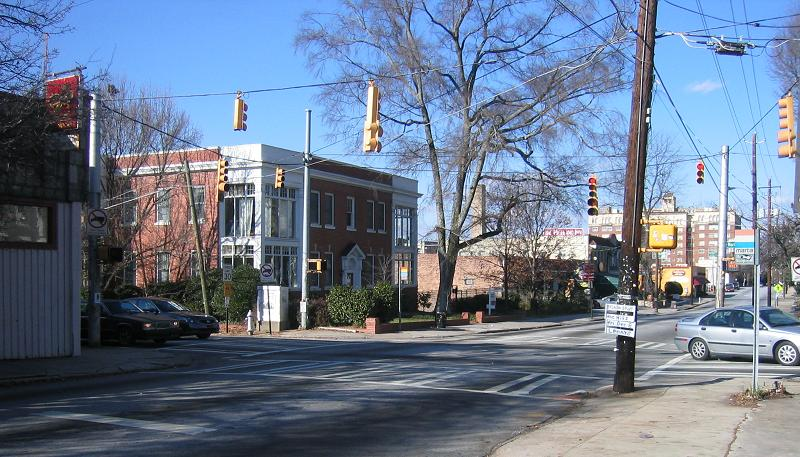
- Corner of North Avenue and Highland Avenue
- Interactive map of Poncey–Highland
- Coordinates: 33°46′20″N 84°21′09″W
- Country: United States
- State: Georgia
- County: Fulton County
- City: City of Atlanta
- NPU: N

Population (2000)
  - Total: 8,478

Demographics (2000)
  - White/other: %
  - Black: %
  - Asian: %
  - Hispanic: %
- ZIP Code: 30306
- Website: Poncey–Highland Neighborhood Association

Poncey–Highland is an intown neighborhood on the east side of Atlanta, Georgia, located south of Virginia–Highland. It is so named because it is near the intersection of east/west Ponce de Leon Avenue and north/southwest North Highland Avenue. This Atlanta neighborhood was established between 1905 and 1930, and is bordered by Druid Hills and Candler Park across Moreland Avenue to the east, the Old Fourth Ward across the BeltLine Eastside Trail to the west, Inman Park across the eastern branch of Freedom Parkway to the south, and Virginia Highland to the north across Ponce de Leon Avenue. The Little Five Points area sits on the border of Poncey–Highland, Inman Park, and Candler Park.

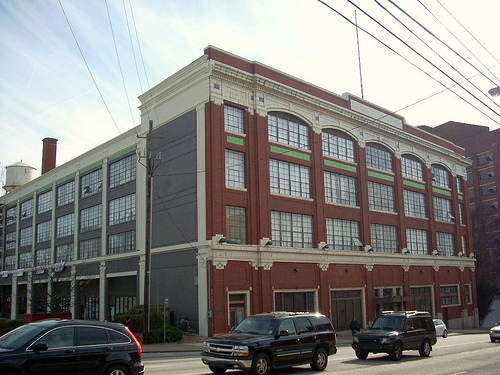
Front and side view of the Ford Assembly Plant from Ponce de Leon Avenue

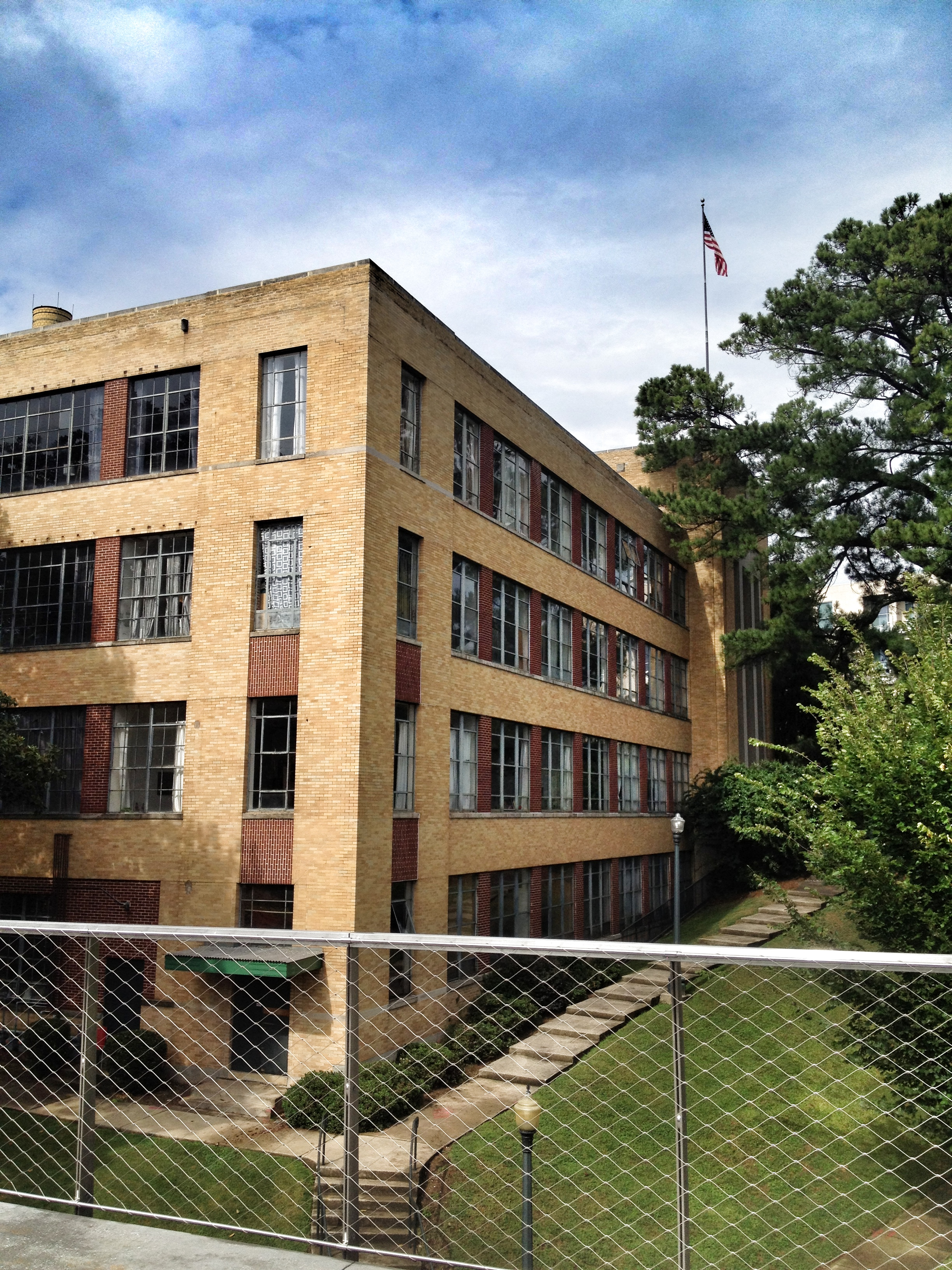
Western Electric Company building at 820 Ralph McGill

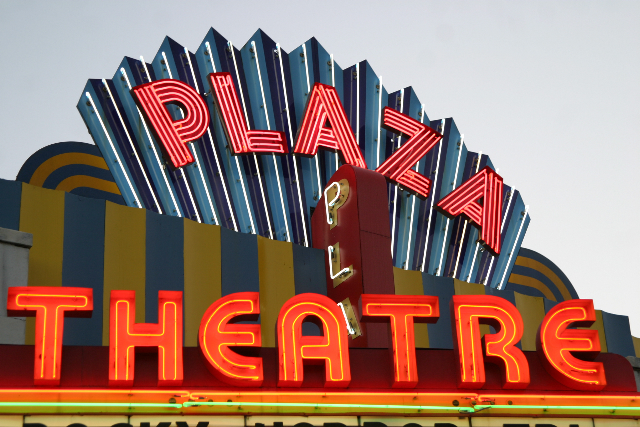
Plaza Theatre at Briarcliff Plaza

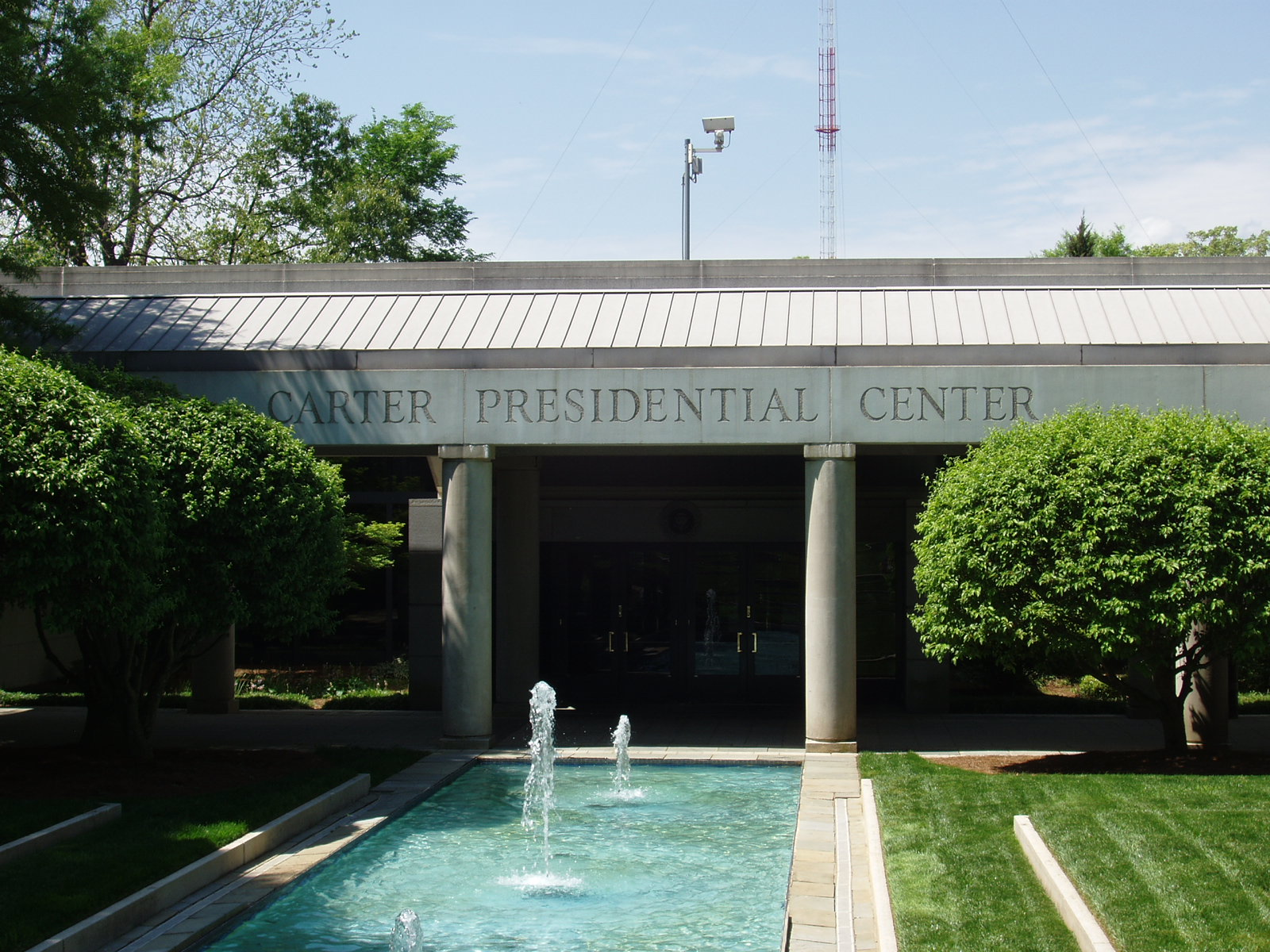
Jimmy Carter Library and Museum, next to the Carter Center

Poncey–Highland is home to the Jimmy Carter Presidential Library, established in 1982. The Carter Center occupies an area of land that was originally the neighborhood of Copenhill, and which was razed to build an interchange between eight-lane highways: Interstate 485 (now Stone Mountain Freeway) east and west, and Georgia 400 and Interstate 675 north and south. The development was successfully stopped by the surrounding neighborhoods, leaving Freedom Parkway in the area where GDOT had already demolished over 500 homes.

Poncey–Highland has numerous historic buildings, including:

- Ford Motor Company Assembly Plant (c. 1916)
- Western Electric Company building at 820 Ralph McGill
- Briarcliff Plaza, containing the Majestic Diner (c. 1929) and the Plaza Theatre (1939), an art-deco cinema hosting numerous film events and the focal point of independent cinema in Atlanta
- Hotel Clermont (c. 1924), and its basement Clermont Lounge, a landmark strip club open since 1965.

The BeltLine, a multi-use corridor of walking and biking paths and eventually a light rail line, built on the old Southern Railway tracks that form the western boundary of Poncey–Highland. The BeltLine Eastside Trail borders Poncey–Highland.

Around the intersection of North Avenue and North Highland are:

- Manuel's Tavern, a local political hangout and one of Atlanta's oldest taverns
- The Highland Inn (1927), one of Atlanta's only independent hotels

The so-called Murder Kroger at 725 Ponce de Leon Ave. was razed in 2016 and replaced by 725 Ponce, a mixed-use development with a new Kroger store.
