= Ann's Snack Bar =

Former restaurant in Atlanta, Georgia, U.S.

Coordinates: 33.7473°N 84.3345°W

- Interactive map of Ann's Snack Bar

Restaurant information
- Established: 1971; 55 years ago
- Closed: March 2020; 6 years ago
- Previous owner: Ann Price
- Location: Atlanta, U.S., Georgia

Ann's Snack Bar was a small restaurant in the Kirkwood neighborhood of Atlanta, Georgia famous for its hamburgers. It was owned and operated solely by Ann Price, known to patrons as "Miss Ann," and was in operation from 1971 to 2022.

The house special was called the "Ghetto Burger," a double bacon chili cheeseburger with a secret ingredient, which her patrons named as a joke. Another signature burger with cole slaw was called the "Hood Burger."

A 2007 article in The Wall Street Journal called the Ghetto Burger the best hamburger in America. In the same article, the author declared Atlanta to be the best city for hamburgers, citing the Vortex (in Little Five Points and Midtown Atlanta) and the EARL (in East Atlanta) as other Atlanta restaurants with top hamburgers. Fans include celebrity Sean Combs and a "horde of Twitter-driven food enthusiasts", who began to discover the restaurant after a 1998 Atlanta Constitution article.

Price had been attempting to sell the restaurant and retire since 2009, initially setting the value at $1.5 million. As of late 2010, the difficult real estate market had forced her to lower her asking price.

Price died on April 18, 2015, at the age of 72. Cause of death was not stated, but Price had been suffering from blood clots and breast cancer. The restaurant remained open, as Price had taken on assistants over the few years prior including her cousin Adele, and was most recently ran by Price's sister and three brothers.

The restaurant closed in March 2020 as a result of the covid-19 pandemic and never reopened. The property was put up for sale in December 2023.

== See also ==
- List of hamburger restaurants
