= Alonzo A. Crim Open Campus High School =

Alonzo Aristotle Crim Open Campus High School
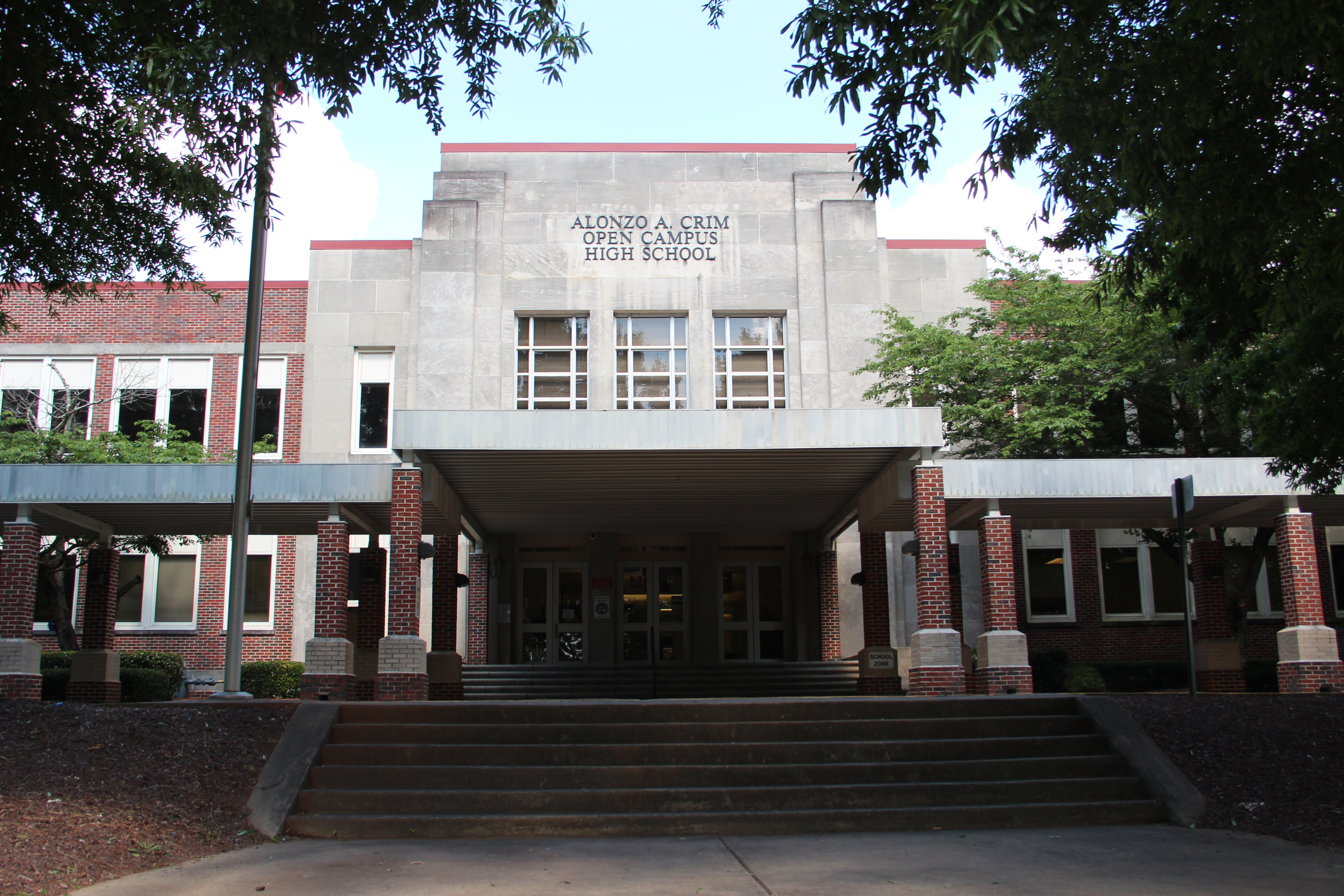

Location
- 256 Clifton Street Southeast; Atlanta, Georgia 30317; United States; 33°44′43.46″N 84°19′51.23″W

Information
- Type: Public
- Motto: "One Campus Open to a World of Opportunities"
- Established: 2005
- School district: Atlanta Public Schools
- Grades: 9–12
- Campus: Urban
- Colors: Blue and white
- Mascot: Eagles
- Nickname: Crim, Crim High
- Yearbook: Azuwur
- Website: https://www.atlantapublicschools.us/crim

Alonzo A. Crim Open Campus High School (COCHS) was a public high school in Atlanta, Georgia, United States that closed in 2020. It replaced Alonzo A. Crim Comprehensive High School after it closed in 2005. Part of Atlanta Public Schools, it is located at 256 Clifton Street SE in southeast Atlanta, in the Kirkwood neighborhood.

The school is inside DeKalb County.

== History ==
Until 1988, the school was named Murphy High School. From 1988 to 2005, the school was named Alonzo Aristotle Crim Comprehensive High School. Its feeder schools were Sammye E. Coan Middle School and Thurgood Marshall Middle School.

== Former athletic programs ==
The Eagles athletic teams competed in Region 2-AA of the Georgia High School Association.

In its last year as a traditional school, Crim High School's athletic program offered varsity girls' softball, varsity boys' track, varsity football, varsity boys' basketball, junior varsity boys' basketball, varsity girls' basketball, junior varsity girls' basketball, varsity basketball, junior varsity basketball, and cheerleading.

== Notable alumni (traditional school) ==
Name	Class year	Notability	References
Anthony Carter	1989	professional basketball player for the Denver Nuggets	
Shandon Anderson	1991	former NBA player who played for the Houston Rockets, New York Knicks, Miami Heat, and Utah Jazz	
Larry Brown	1994	Former NFL player	
Gerran Walker	2001	former football wide receiver for the Indianapolis Colts	
Inky Johnson	2004	motivational speaker and former college football player	
Richard Dent	1979	Super Bowl XX MVP	
