= Midtown High School =

Midtown High School may refer to:

- Midtown High School (Atlanta), a high school in Midtown Atlanta
- Midtown High School (comics), a fictional high school in the Marvel Comics
  - Midtown School of Science and Technology, the version of the high school in the Marvel Cinematic Universe
