= Eastside, Atlanta =

City district of Atlanta, Georgia

Coordinates: 33°45′N 84°21′W

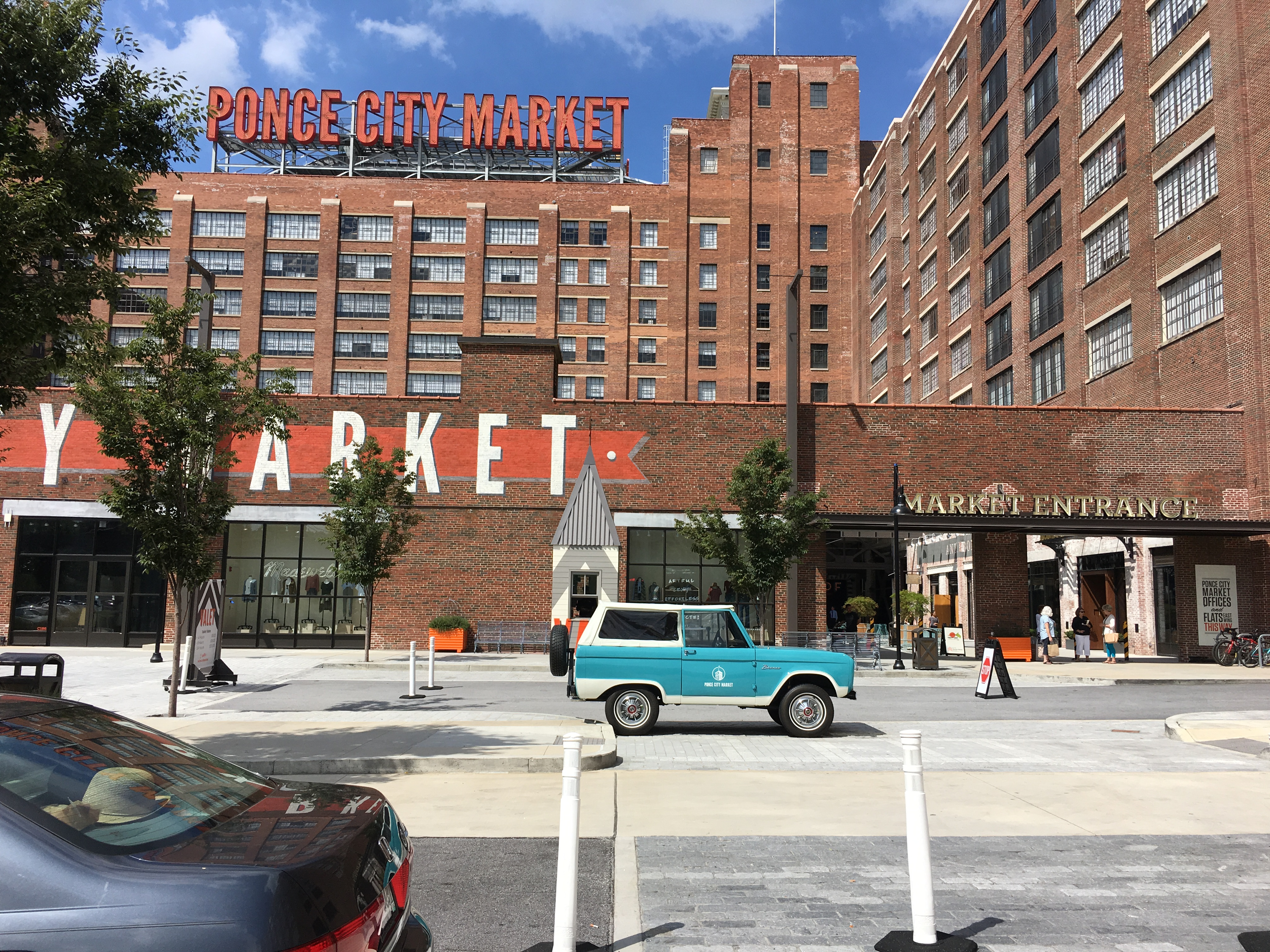
The entrance of Ponce City Market, a large mixed-use development.

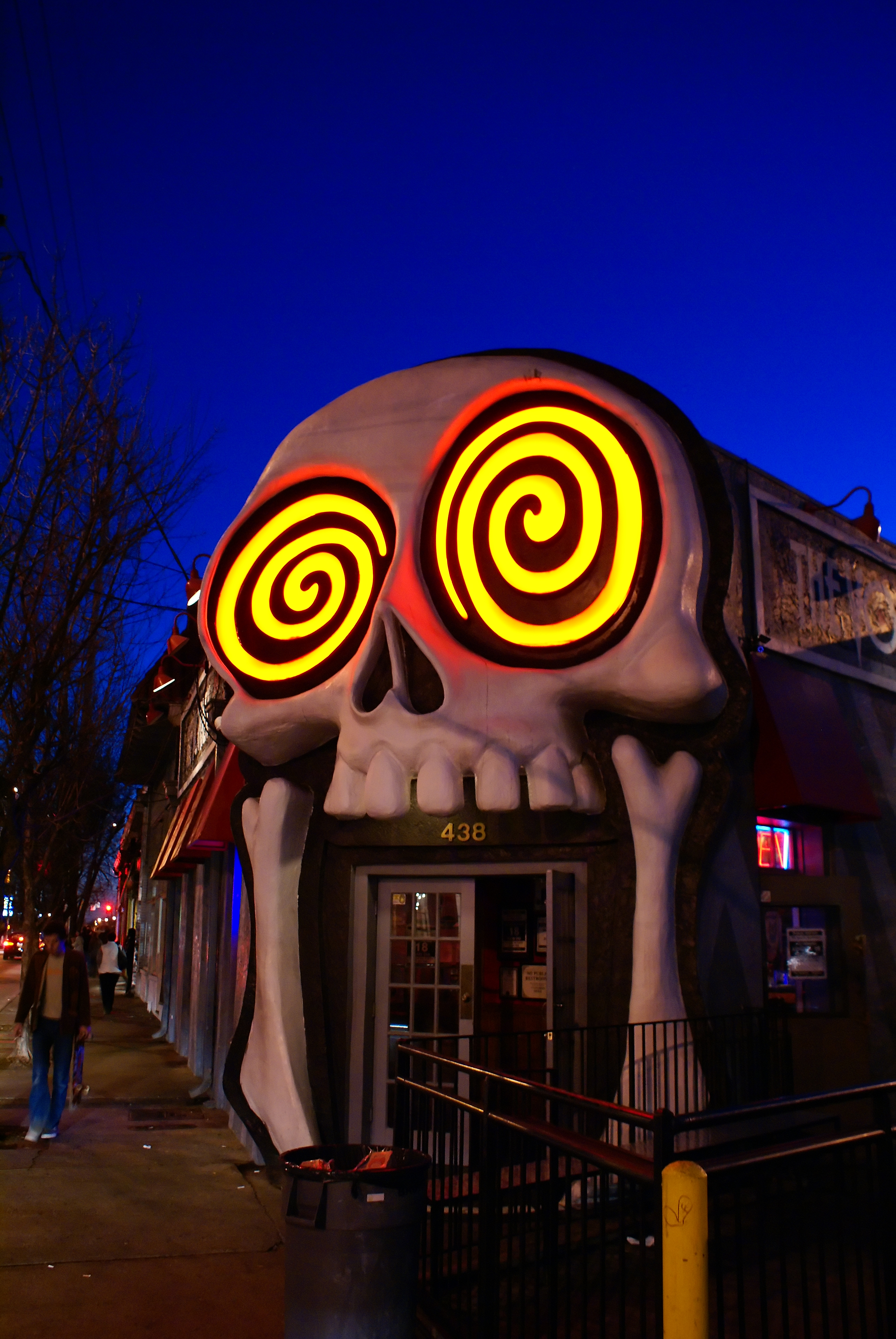
The Vortex restaurant, Little Five Points

Eastside refers to the city district comprising the easternmost portion of Atlanta, Georgia, United States. The Eastside generally encompasses the area bounded on the west by Midtown Atlanta and Downtown Atlanta and on the east by the city limits. The central corridor of the district is the BeltLine Eastside Trail, which connects northern Eastside neighborhoods with those to the south. The Eastside is known for its nightlife establishments, craftsman architecture, local eateries, and quirky public art.

== History ==
The area that is now the Eastside was the site of the Battle of Atlanta, which was part of the Atlanta campaign and sealed the fate of the Confederacy. Indeed, Lemuel P. Grant designed the city's fortifications to protect his plantation on what is now the Eastside neighborhood of Grant Park. General James B. McPherson placed his Yankee forces on high ground a mile east of Grant's plantation, in the neighborhood today known as East Atlanta.

Beginning in the 1890s, streetcar suburbs were constructed on the Eastside as havens for the upper middle class. These neighborhoods, many of which contained their own villages encircled by shaded, architecturally distinct residential streets, include the Victorian Inman Park, Bohemian East Atlanta, and eclectic Old Fourth Ward. Some Eastside neighborhoods, including Kirkwood and Edgewood, were separate municipalities before annexation by Atlanta in 1909 and 1915. By mid-century, the Eastside began to succumb to the effects of urban decay and white flight, with Virginia-Highland remaining a notable exception to the area's decline. While the area suffered during the 1970s and 1980s nadir of Atlanta's depopulation, much of its historic architecture remained intact.

In 1990, when Atlanta's intown resurgence began in earnest, the Eastside served as the starting point for the city's gentrification wave. Indeed, while rising property values in the 1990s displaced older, long-term residents as middle- and upper-income residents across the city, in few areas were these increases as dramatic as in the enclave of neighborhoods on the Eastside of Atlanta. Due to the close proximity to downtown, an ample stock of historic housing, and distinct commercial villages, property values on the Eastside skyrocketed. In Kirkwood, for example, median sales prices soared 275% from 1993 to 2003.

The initialization of the BeltLine project in 2005 sent the area's revitalization into overdrive. During the 2000s, more than $775 million in private investment was pumped into the half-mile radius surrounding the Eastside Trail, including a $180 million transformation of a former Sears warehouse into Ponce City Market.

With the dawn of the 21st century, many former industrial buildings bordering the trail were repurposed for residential and retail use. Examples are Ponce City Market, Krog Street Market, Telephone Factory Lofts and many others particularly in the Old Fourth Ward, Inman Park Village, and Kirkwood.

== Neighborhoods ==
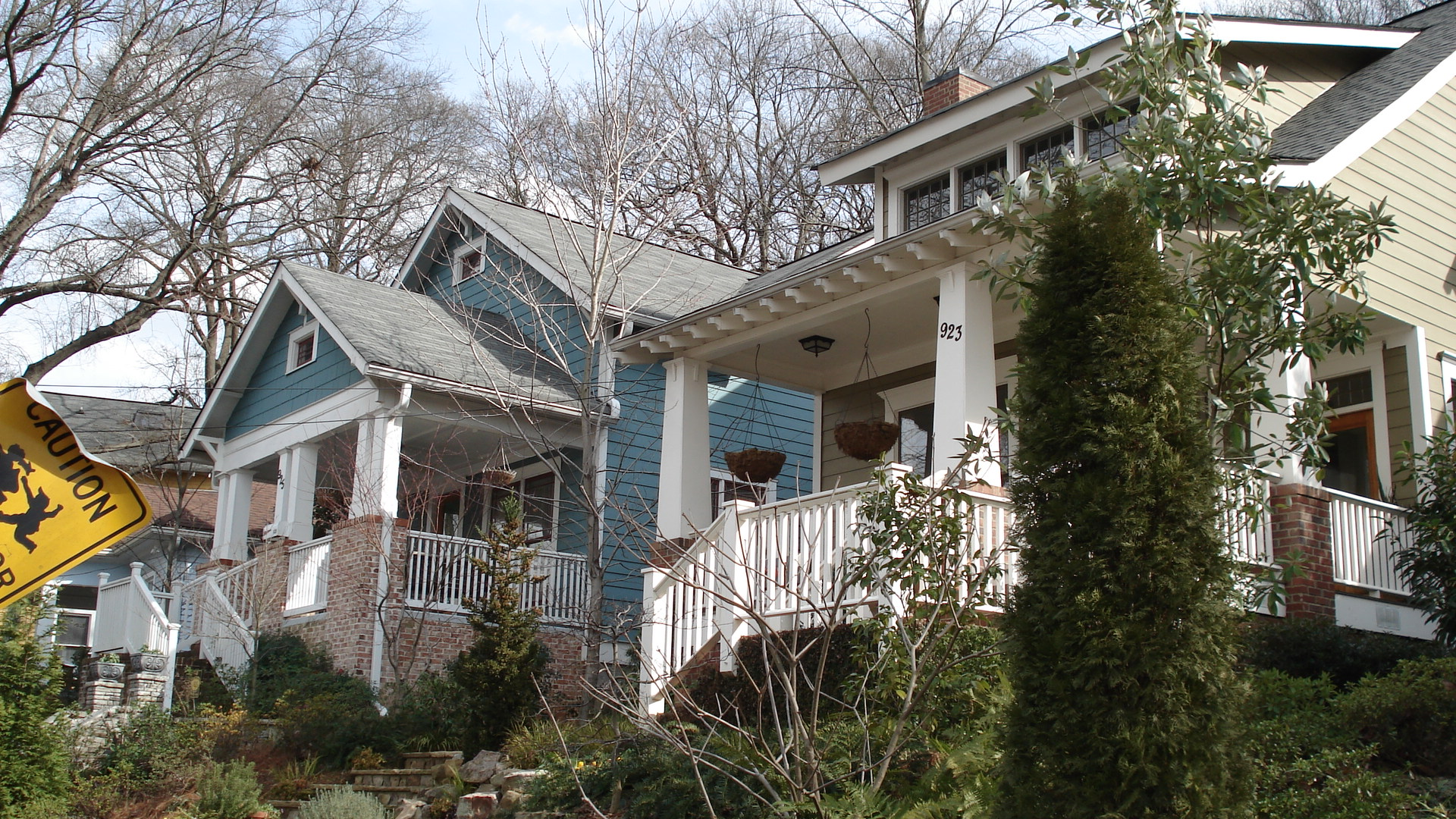
Bungalows on Atlanta's Eastside

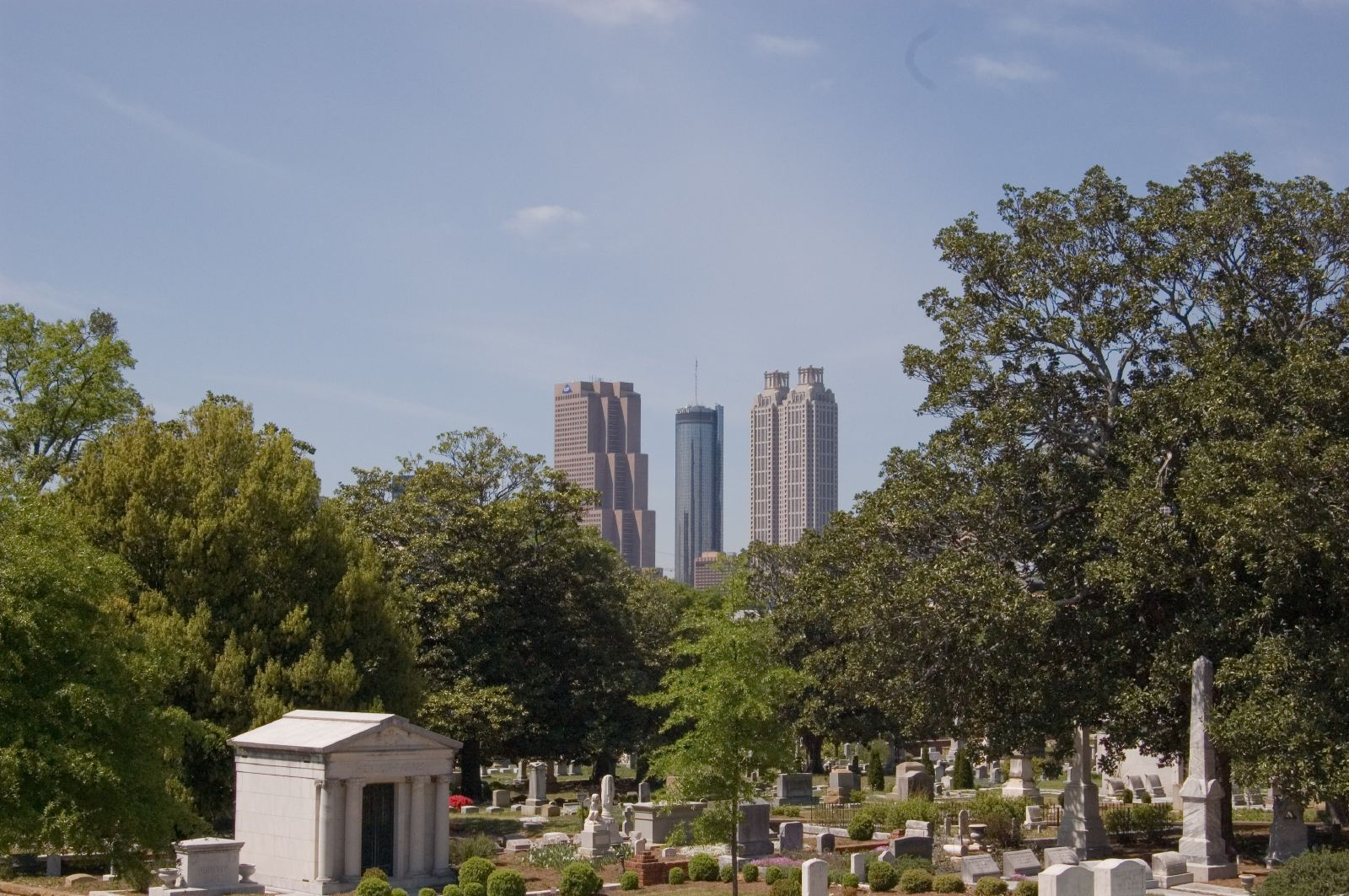
Oakland Cemetery

- Atkins Park n
- Cabbagetown n h
- Candler Park
- Decatur (part in Atlanta)
- Druid Hills (part in Atlanta)
- East Atlanta
- East Lake
- Edgewood
- Grant Park n h
- Glenwood Park
- Inman Park n h
- Kirkwood
- Lake Claire
- Lindridge‑Martin Manor n
- Morningside‑Lenox Park n
- North Ormewood Park
- Oakland
- Old Fourth Ward n
- Ormewood Park n
- Piedmont Heights n
- Poncey-Highland n
- Reynoldstown n
- Summerhill
- Sweet Auburn h
- Virginia-Highland n

Little Five Points is a commercial district located where Inman Park and Candler Park meet.
