= Inky Johnson =

American football player and motivational speaker (born 1986)

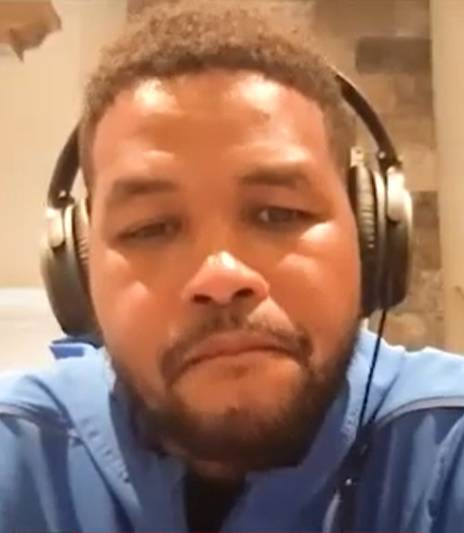
- Johnson in 2020

No. 29
- Position: Cornerback

Personal information
- Born: February 12, 1986 (age 40)
- Listed height: 5 ft 9 in (1.75 m)
- Listed weight: 180 lb (82 kg)

Career information
- High school: Crim (Atlanta)
- College: Tennessee (2005–2006)
- Stats at ESPN

Inquoris Desmond Chade Johnson (born February 12, 1986) is an American motivational speaker and former college football player. His football career ended in 2006 at the University of Tennessee with an injury that permanently paralyzed his right arm. Johnson studied psychology and became a motivational speaker. He was the keynote speaker at the Greater Knoxville Sports Hall of Fame induction ceremony.

== Early life ==
Johnson grew up in a home of 14 people in the Kirkwood neighborhood of Atlanta, Georgia. The son of Ruby Kay Lewis and stepfather Ricky Lewis Sr., he was a football player at Alonzo A. Crim Comprehensive High School.

== College ==
Johnson graduated from the University of Tennessee with a Bachelor's of Arts degree in political science from the College of Arts and Sciences in 2007, and a Master's degree in sport psychology in 2009 from the College of Education, Health, and Human Sciences.

== Personal life ==
Johnson is a Christian. Johnson is married to Allison Johnson. They have two children.

== See also ==
- 2005 Tennessee Volunteers football team
- 2006 Tennessee Volunteers football team
