= Lake Claire, Atlanta =

Neighborhood of Atlanta, Georgia

Coordinates: 33°45′54″N 84°19′31″W

The Watershed Mural on Dekalb Avenue

Lake Claire is a neighborhood on the east side of Atlanta, Georgia, United States, comprising approximately 1,400 homes. It is situated entirely in the DeKalb County side of the city, east of Candler Park, north of Kirkwood, west of Decatur, and south of Druid Hills.

There was never an actual body of water known as Lake Claire; rather, the name was shorthand for the intersection of Lakeshore and Claire Drives. The closest thing to a commercial district is the small strip bordering Candler Park at McLendon and Clifton.

The adjacent neighborhood is the Candler Park Historic District, which has been listed on the National Register of Historic Places.

== Education ==
Residents in Lake Claire are within Atlanta Public Schools.

Zoned schools include: :

- Mary Lin Elementary School
- Samuel M. Inman Middle School
- David T. Howard Middle School
- Midtown High School
