= Little Five Fest =

Annual music festival in Atlanta, Georgia, United States

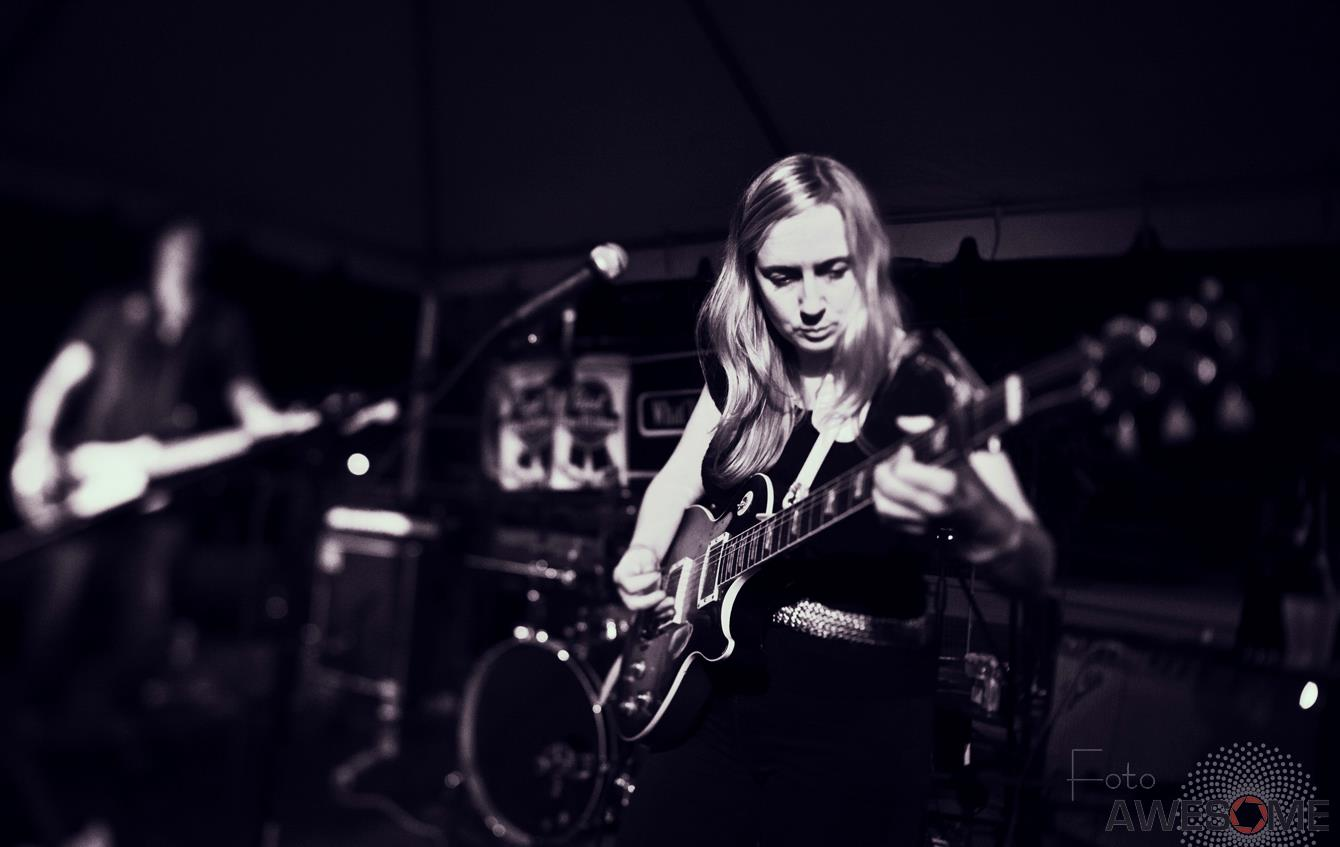
Anna Kramer and the Lost Cause at Little 5 Fest 2012

Little Five Fest is a music festival in Atlanta, Georgia. The event partnered with several local venues and featured 50 or so local bands as an annual showcase of the music of Atlanta. The event started in 2004 as "Othersound Music Festival" and evolved over the years to take on a more general tone representing the entire area of Little 5 Points and as an alternative to the mainstream music festival Music Midtown. The festival focused on local and independent music groups: "Focusing on bands just under the indie mainstream radar, the Other Sound Music Festival has a rich history of booking the right bands.". The festival usually features bands from local label mainstays like Rob's House Records, Die Slaughterhaus Records and ISP-Music (Industrial Strength Promotions) among others. While previous festivals focused heavily on rock music, the festival featured a variety of musical genres including rap, hip-hop, country, electronic music, DJ sets, performance art and theatre.

== Past lineups (partial list) ==
=== 2009 (partial list) ===
Star Bar Stage: The Selmanaires, Book Of Colors, A Fight To The Death, Grand Prize Winners From Last Year, Club Awesome, Falcon Lords, Distile Records - United States "Unsilvered Mirrors", Author's Apology, Los Buenos Criminal Records stage: Jeffrey Butzer, The Orphins, Yo La Tengo, This Piano Plays itself

=== 2010 (Lineup by venue) ===
Criminal Records music & comic book store	Java Lords Coffee Shop	Star Bar Main Stage	Star Bar Basement	The Five Spot
2:30 – Back Pockets 3:30 – The Wild 4:30 – A Fight to the Death 5:30 – Mermaids	2:00 – Wes Ables 3:00 – Hawkeye Pierce 4:00 – Platonic Sex 5:00 – The Falcon Lords	6:00 – What Happened to Your Fire, Tiger 7:00 – Book of Colors 8:00 – Little Tybee 9:00 – West End Motel 9:40 – Author's Apology 10:15 – The Charges 11:15 – Abby GoGo 12:15 – Skin Jobs	6:30 – Walk from the Gallows 7:30 – Starfighter 8:30 – Buffalo Bangers 9:30 – King Congregation 10:30 – Tornado Town 11:30 – Odist	7:00 – Meut 8:00 – Jeremy Ray & The Gonzo Orchestra 9:00 – Weapons of Audio 10:00 – Oryx and Crake 11:00 – Grand Prize Winners from Last Year 12:00 – Omelet

=== 2011 (partial lineup) ===
- Aku You
- Anna Kramer and the Lost Cause
- Baby Baby
- Back Pockets
- Cousin Dan
- Darling Norman
- DJ Homo
- G.G. King
- Ghost Bikini
- Glen Iris (Members included Justin Hughes of Rock*A*Teens fame and Chris Strawn)
- Grand Prize Winners from Last Year
- Gun Party
- Hawkeye Pierce
- Hip to Death
- I Want Whisky
- Jack of Hearts
- Jack Preston and the Dojo Collective
- Jade Lemons and the Crimson Lust
- Jeffrey Bützer
- King Congregation
- Lille
- Lucy Dreams
- Mermaids
- Order of the Owl
- Ralph
- Skin Jobs
- Shepherds
- Street Violence
- The Head
- This Piano Plays Itself
- Tornado Town
- West End Motel (Members included Brent Hinds of Mastodon and Tom Cheshire)
- What Happened to Your Fire, Tiger?
- Young Antiques
- Young Orchids

In 2012 the venues were hosted at Criminal Records music and comic book shop, Aurora Coffee and three stages at the Star Bar.

=== 2012 ===
According to Creative Loafing (Atlanta), the 2012 festival took place on September 29, 2012, and featured over 90 bands and was spread across 9 venues.

== Sponsors and supporters ==
While the festival is usually sponsored mostly by local record labels and businesses, there have been a number of nationally known sponsors such as Pabst Blue Ribbon (produced by the Pabst Brewing Company), the High Museum of Art, Creative Loafing, Zipcar, Orange Amplification, Scoutmob and Whynatte Latte.
