= Edgewood, Atlanta =

Neighborhood on the east side of Atlanta, Georgia, United States

Coordinates: 33.7617726°N 84.341314°W

Edgewood is a historic neighborhood located on the east side of Atlanta, Georgia, United States, located approximately 3 miles (4.8 km) east of downtown Atlanta.

== History ==
Originally called Hardeville, after the area's largest landowner, William J. Hardee. The area became popular when a train depot for the Georgia Railroad, was built near Clifton Rd and Dekalb Ave. The name Edgewood was first mentioned in 1879 by the Soles Gazette. The article goes on to describe the burgeoning town and the people who lived there. The town was that of the blue collar worker, with a large African American population, the streets lined with American Craftsman style homes contrasting the Victorian Architecture of the Kirkwood and Candler Park neighborhoods. Edgewood was annexed into Atlanta in 1909. In return the neighborhood's infrastructure, was heavily upgraded. Edgewood was developed during Atlanta's Reconstruction-era economic boom from 1870 to 1910. The population boom led to the further development of the neighborhood. Companies like Cotton Seed Oil and Virginia Chemical developing in what is now Carlye Park. By the 1920s Edgewood's popularity was booming due to the rise of the streetcar in Atlanta. Affluent families were coming to Edgewood for the convenient travel time from downtown and stayed for the lively community. In the 20's, Coca-Cola's Asa Candler took a vested interest in the community. Candler took to developing the northern part of the neighborhood, going as far as to donate the land that now holds the Candler Park Golf Course and fighting for the creation of the Mary Lin Elementary School.

== Demographic shift ==
Since its inception in the late 1800s, Edgewood has had a sizeable Black population. The neighborhood also had many White residents with little segregation between races which was common in the late 1800s. The Black population became the overwhelmingly majority as White flight to the suburbs became popular in Atlanta between the 1960s and 1980s. During the peak of White flight, Edgewood became infamous for rampant crime and blight. However, in the 1990s, there was a strong increase of revitalization and public safety efforts in Edgewood which created broader interest in the neighborhood. By 2020, the neighborhood gradually changed from majority Black and lower-income to majority White and upper-middle-income.

== Geography ==
While the entire Atlanta-in-DeKalb area is sometimes called "east Atlanta," the neighborhood of East Atlanta is to the south-southeast of Edgewood. Kirkwood is immediately to the east of Edgewood, with Reynoldstown just to the west, and Candler Park to the north.

While Edgewood Avenue was named for Edgewood and stretches from downtown Atlanta in the direction of Edgewood, the avenue does not quite reach the neighborhood.

== Commercial district ==
The Edgewood Retail District is a 44-acre (17.6-hectare) mixed-use village located off Moreland Avenue, on the fringe of Little Five Points. Built by Sembler on land formerly owned by Atlanta Gas Light in northwest Edgewood, it is made up of 531,287 square feet (49,358.2 m^{2}) of retail, including the first intown Lowe's home improvement store.

== Parks and recreation ==
- Walker Park is an eight-acre park in the southeast section of the neighborhood. The park sits on a Civil War battleground. The park offers a large multi-use field, dog runs, pavilions and picnic areas, playgrounds, tennis courts, and a community garden.
- Edgewood Green is a four-acre green space south of Memorial Drive owned by Atlanta Public Schools that is leased to the Edgewood neighborhood association to keep it public.

== See also ==
- Edgewood / Candler Park (MARTA station)
