= Candler Park =

City park and neighborhood on the east side of Atlanta, Georgia, United States

- Candler Park Historic District
- U.S. National Register of Historic Places
- U.S. Historic district
- Location within Atlanta Location within Georgia Location within the United States
- Location: Roughly bounded by Moreland, DeKalb, McLendon, and Harold Aves., Mathews St., and Clifton Terr., Atlanta, Georgia
- Coordinates: 33.762773°N 84.326463°W
- Architectural style: Bungalow/Craftsman, Late Victorian
- NRHP reference No.: 83000191
- Added to NRHP: 1983, expanded 2005

Candler Park is a 55-acre (223,000 m^{2}) city park located at 585 Candler Park Drive NE, in Atlanta, Georgia, United States. It is named after Coca-Cola magnate Asa Griggs Candler, who donated this land to the city in 1922. The park features a nine-hole golf course, a swimming pool, a football/soccer field, a basketball court, tennis courts, and a playground.

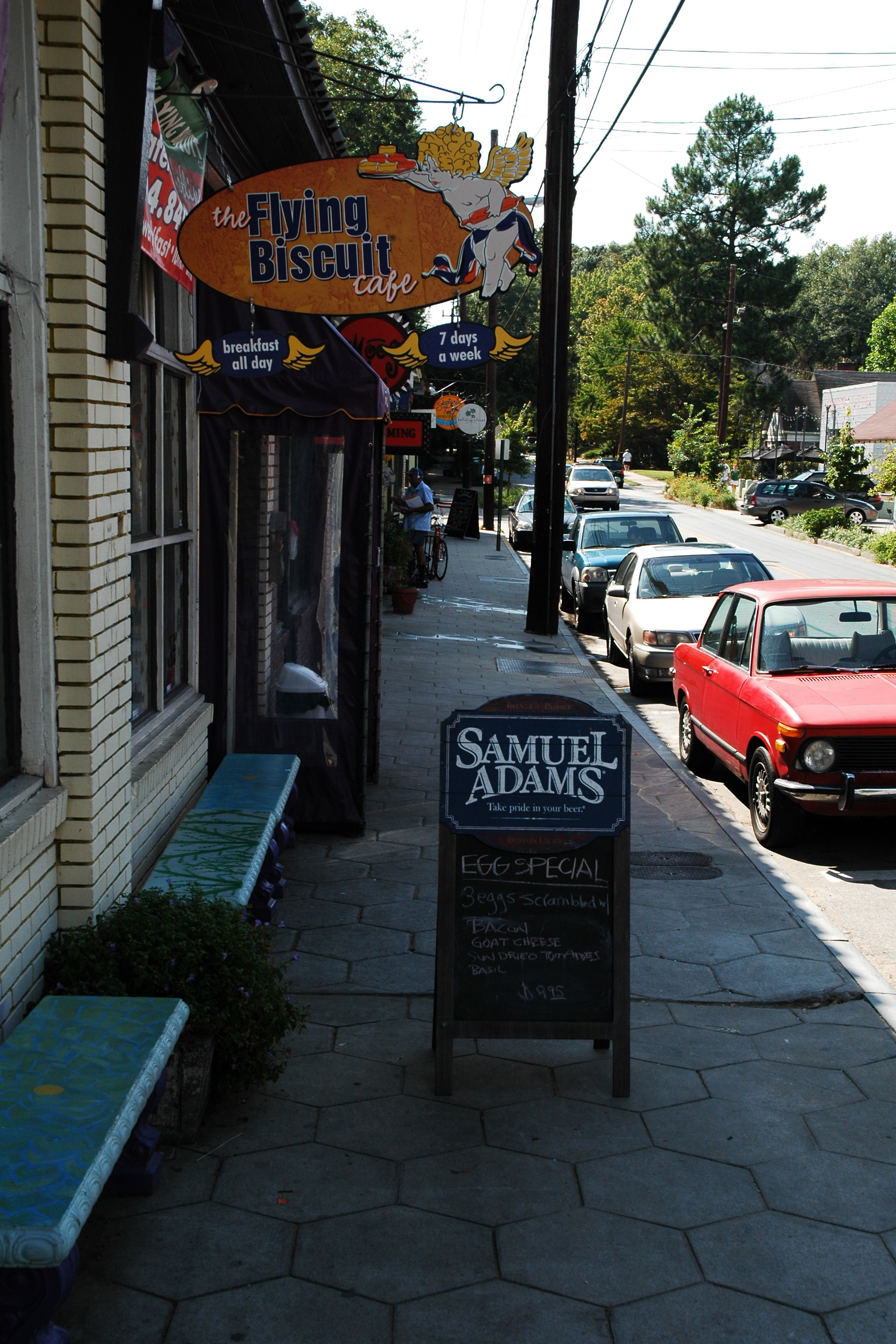
McLendon Ave NE in Candler Park.

Candler Park is also the name of the neighborhood surrounding the park. It is on the east side of the city, bordering Little Five Points, Lake Claire, Inman Park, Druid Hills, and Edgewood.

The Candler Park Historic District was listed on the National Register of Historic Places on September 8, 1983, with a boundary increase on March 17, 2005. It includes portions of Lake Claire.

MARTA rapid transit rail service is available at the Edgewood/Candler Park station.

== School districts ==
Public-school attendance zones include :

- Mary Lin Elementary School
- David T. Howard Middle School
- Midtown High School

== Gallery ==
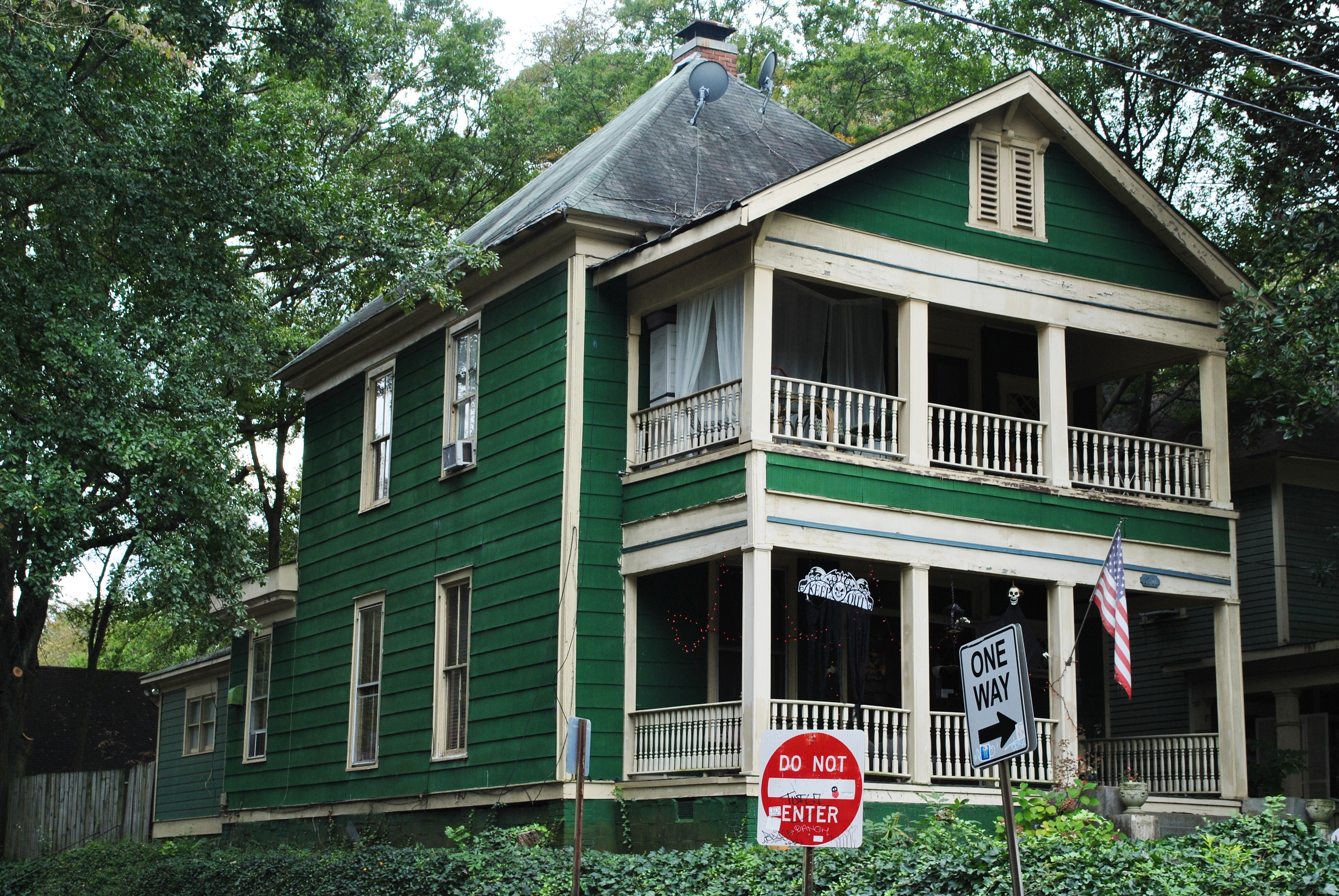
Candler Park Historic District

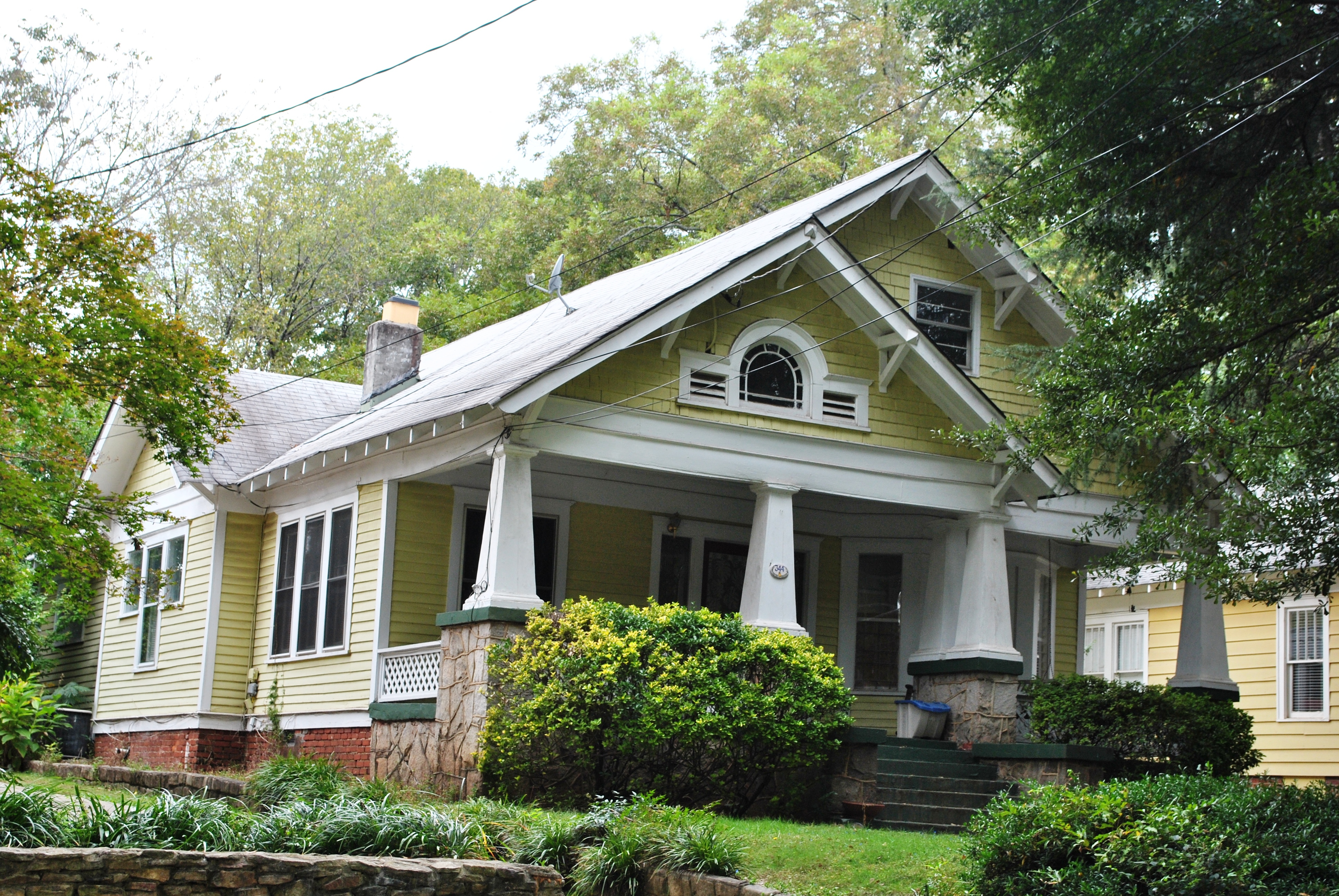
Candler Park Historic District

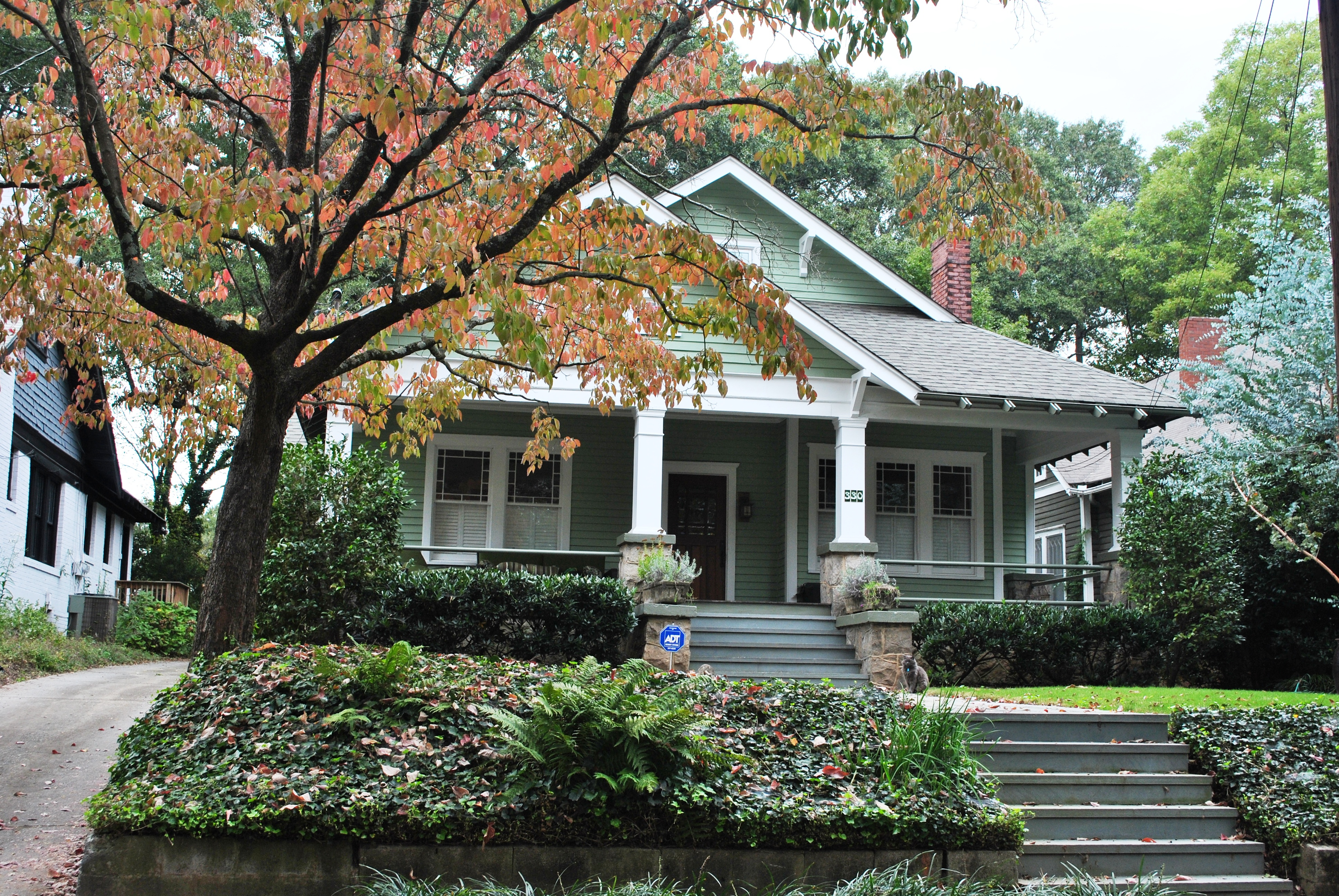
Candler Park Historic District

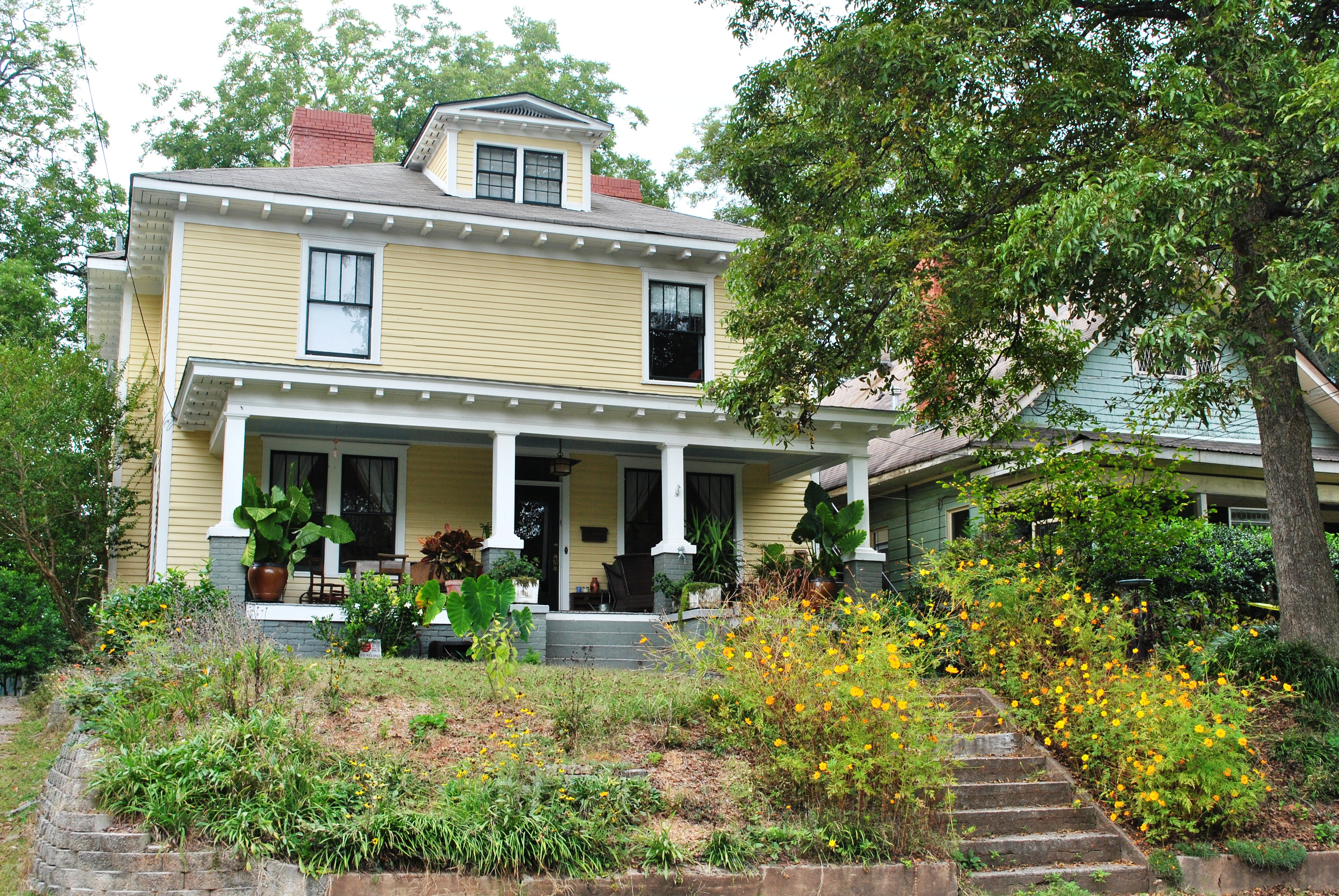
Candler Park Historic District

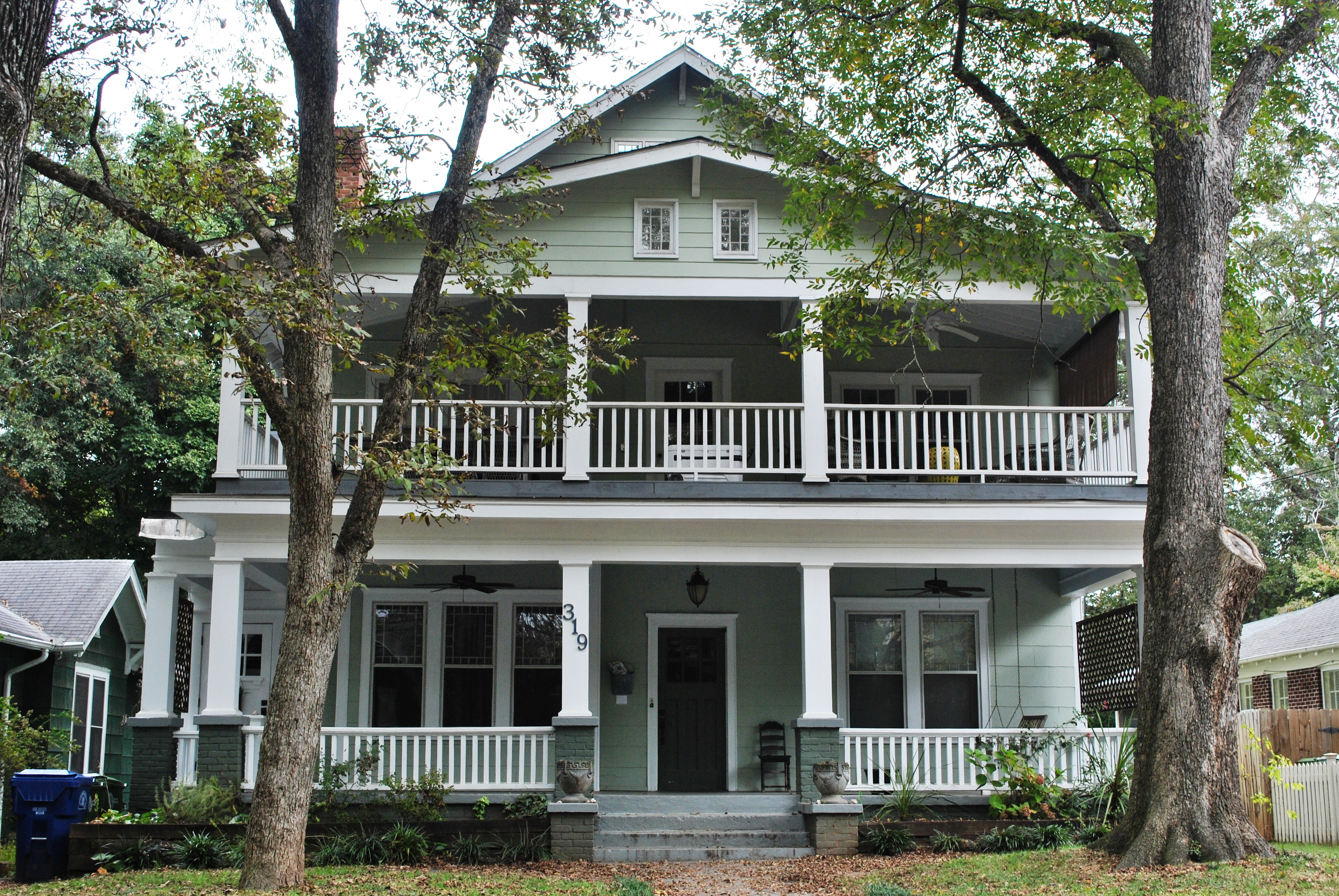
Candler Park Historic District

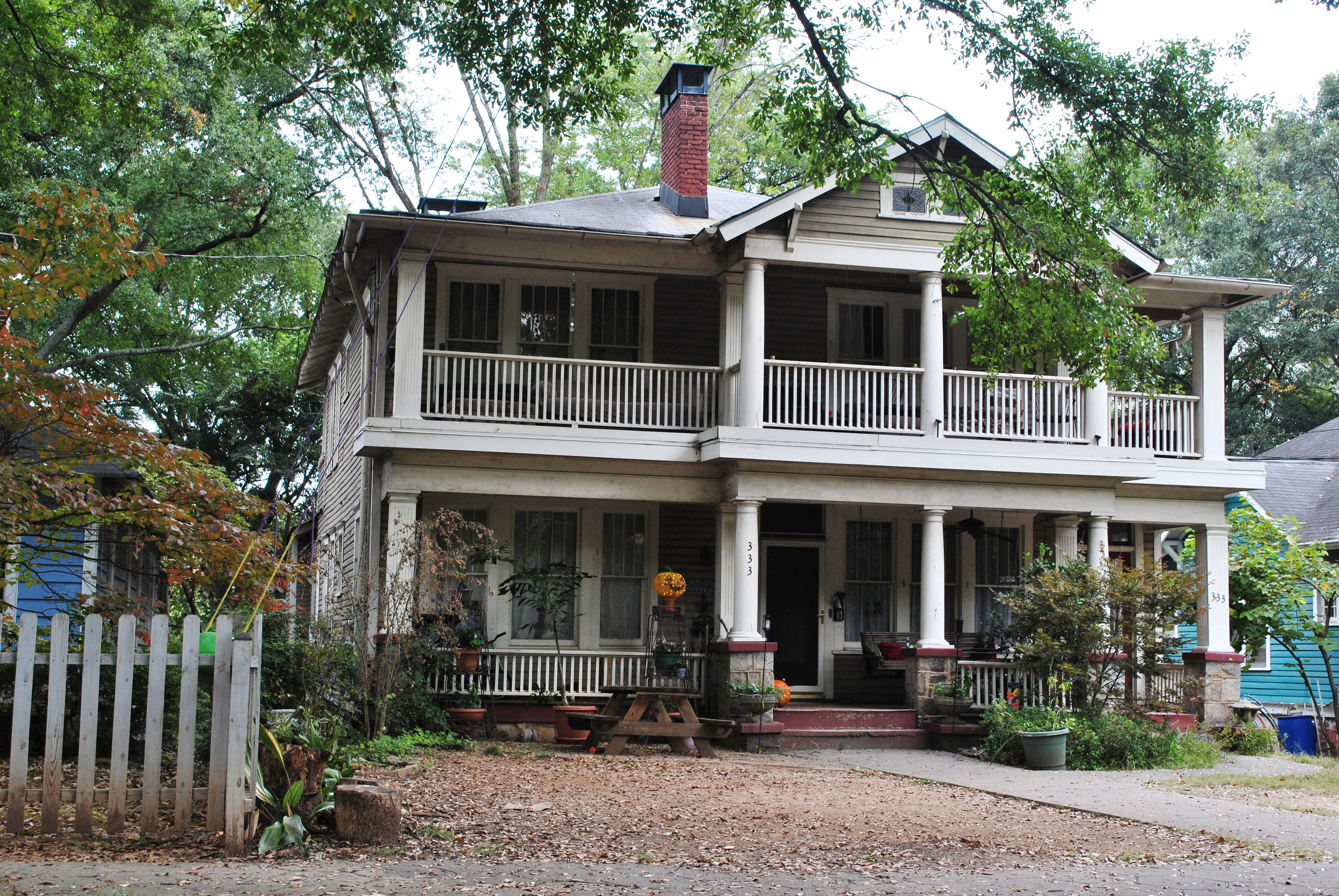
Candler Park Historic District

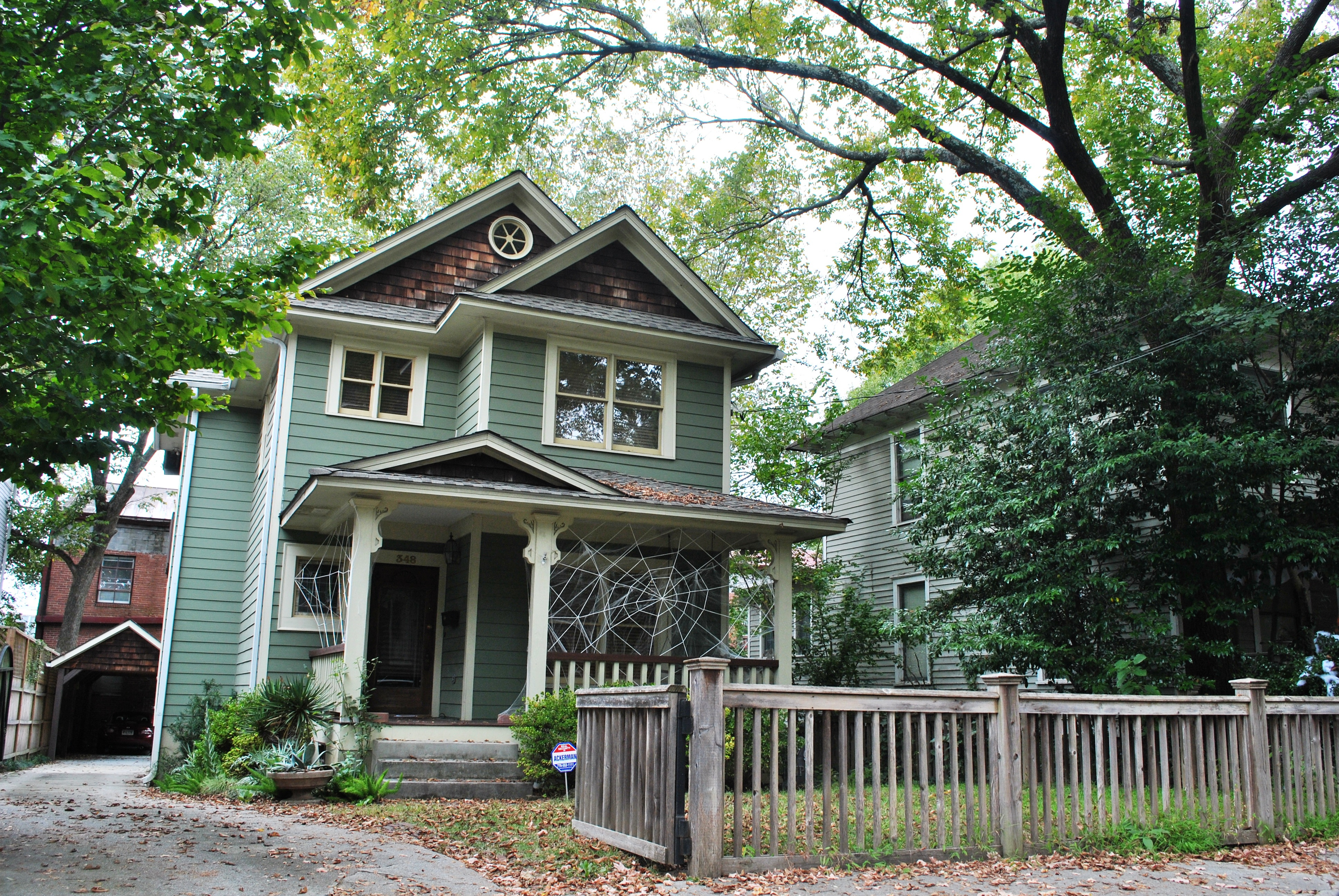
Candler Park Historic District

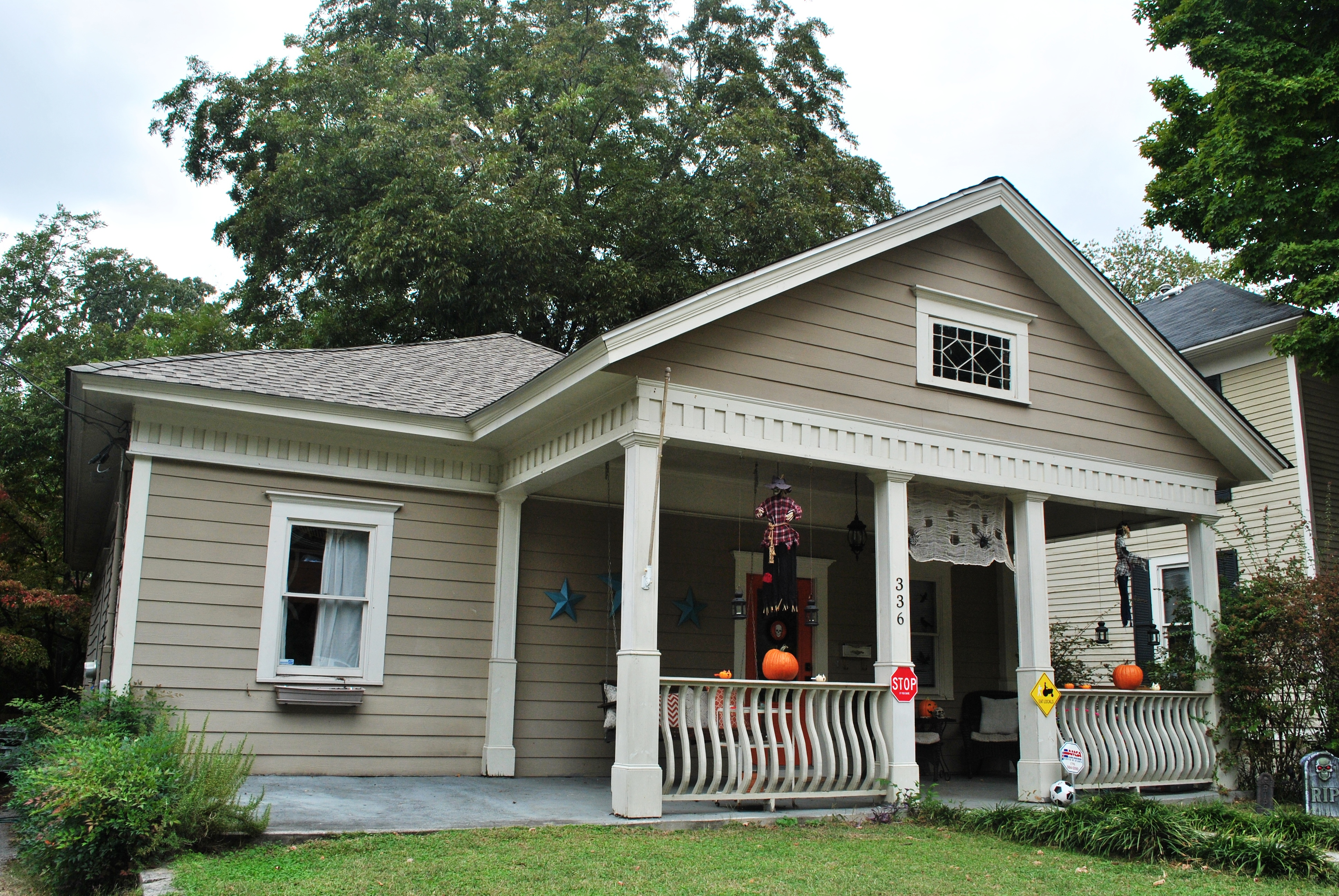
Candler Park Historic District

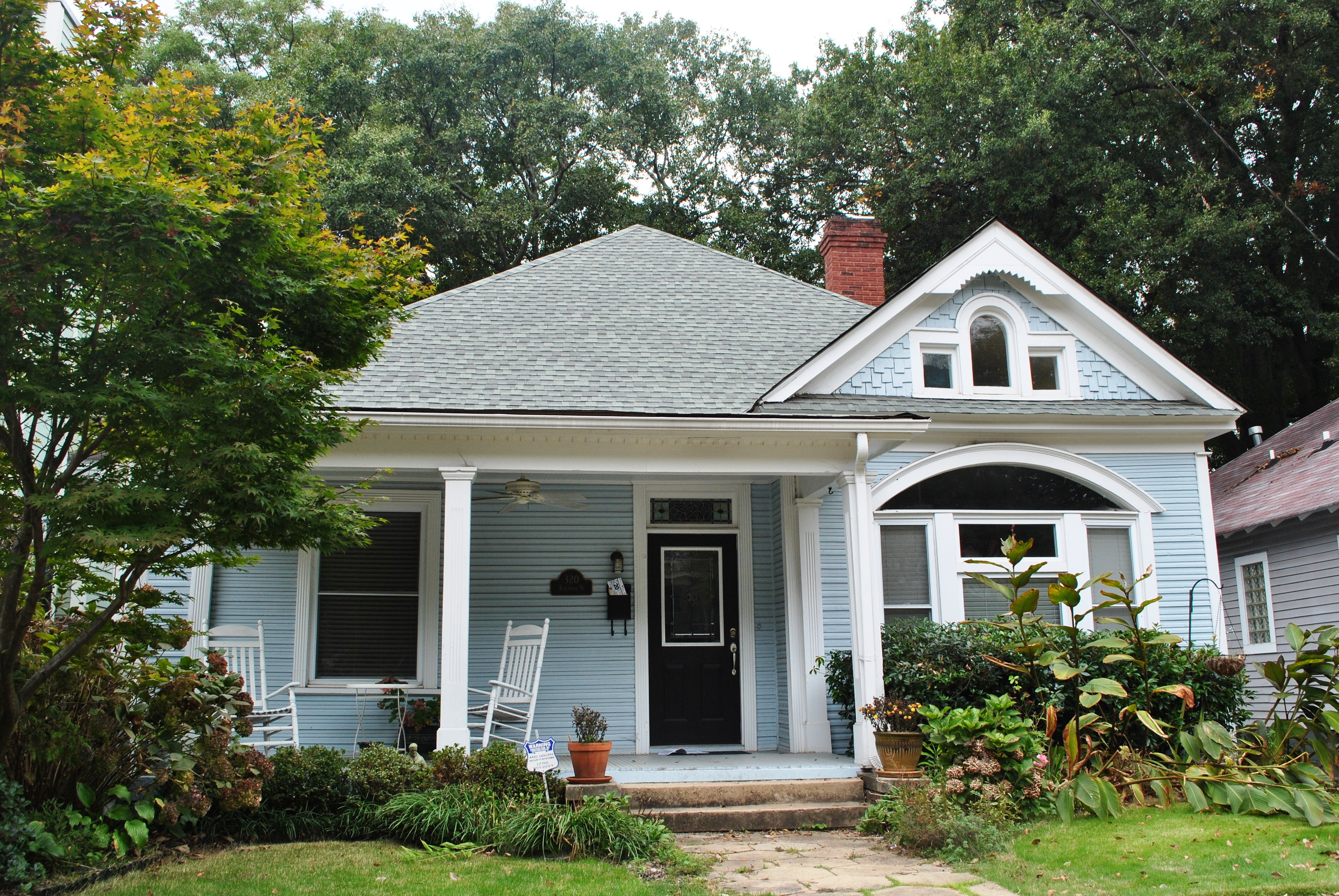
Candler Park Historic District

== See also ==
- Candler Building (Atlanta, Georgia)
- Candler Building (New York City)
- Candler Field
- National Register of Historic Places listings in DeKalb County, Georgia
