= Midtown High School (Atlanta) =

Public high school in Atlanta, Georgia, United States

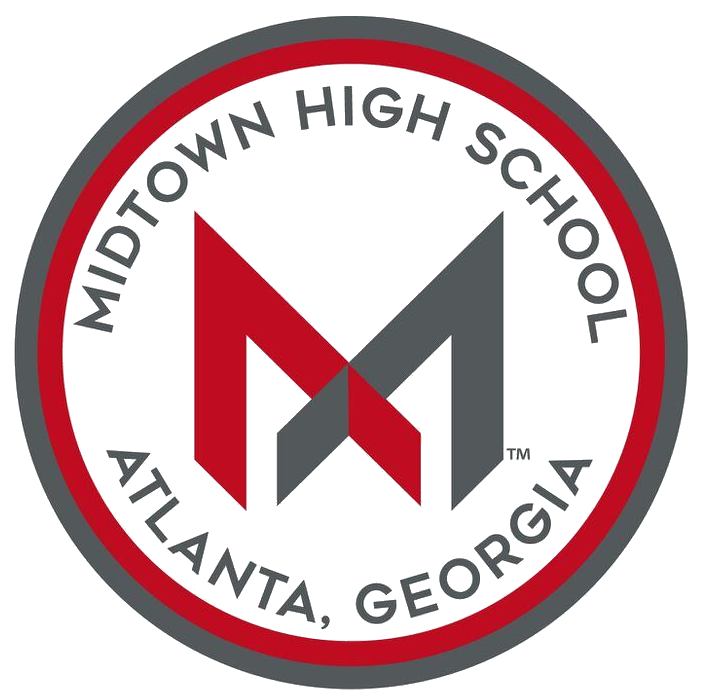

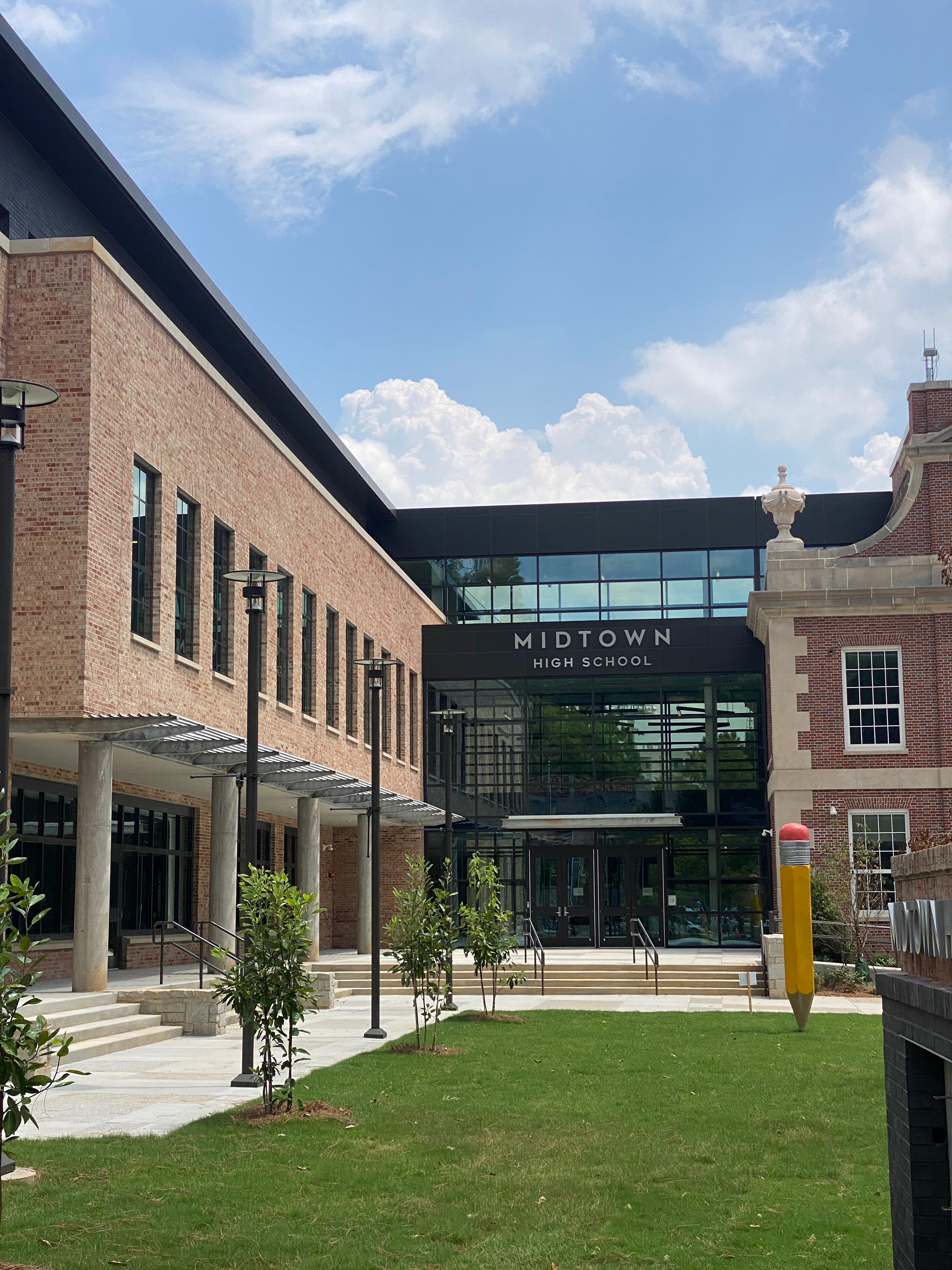
- Midtown High School seen from its new front entrance (Renovated 2020) on Charles Allen Dr.

Location
- 929 Charles Allen Drive; Atlanta, Georgia; United States; 33°46′50″N 84°22′18″W

Information
- Former names: Boys High School (1872-1947); Henry W. Grady High School (1947-2021)
- Type: Public secondary
- Motto: scientia est potestas (Knowledge is Power)
- Established: 1872; 154 years ago
- School district: Atlanta Public Schools
- Principal: Betsy Bockman
- Teaching staff: 106.30 (FTE)
- Grades: 9–12
- Enrollment: 1,658 (2023–2024)
- Student to teacher ratio: 15.60
- Colors: Grey and cardinal red
- Mascot: Knight
- Newspaper: The Southerner
- Yearbook: The Orator
- Website: atlantapublicschools.us/midtown

Midtown High School, formerly Henry W. Grady High School, is a public high school located in Atlanta, Georgia, United States. It began as Boys High School and was one of the first two high schools established by Atlanta Public Schools in 1872. In 1947, the school was named after Henry W. Grady, a journalist and orator in the Reconstruction Era. In December 2020, the Atlanta Board of Education announced the new name of Midtown which took effect June 1, 2021.

Midtown is located adjacent to Piedmont Park at 929 Charles Allen Drive, between 8th and 10th Streets, in Midtown Atlanta.

== Areas served ==
In addition to Midtown Atlanta, the school serves Inman Park, Virginia-Highland, Poncey–Highland, Lake Claire, Candler Park, Old Fourth Ward, Morningside-Lenox Park, Home Park, Atlantic Station, Ansley Park, 10th and Home, the designated family housing unit of Georgia Tech, and parts of Downtown Atlanta. Midtown High also includes the Emory University area. The boundary includes graduate housing complexes which partner with Emory University. The Emory area was annexed into Atlanta effective January 1, 2018. The area was scheduled to join APS in 2024 (previously it was in the DeKalb County School District).

Elementary schools feeding into Midtown High are: Centennial Place, Mary Lin, Hope-Hill, Morningside, and Springdale Park. David T Howard Middle School also feeds into Midtown.

== History ==
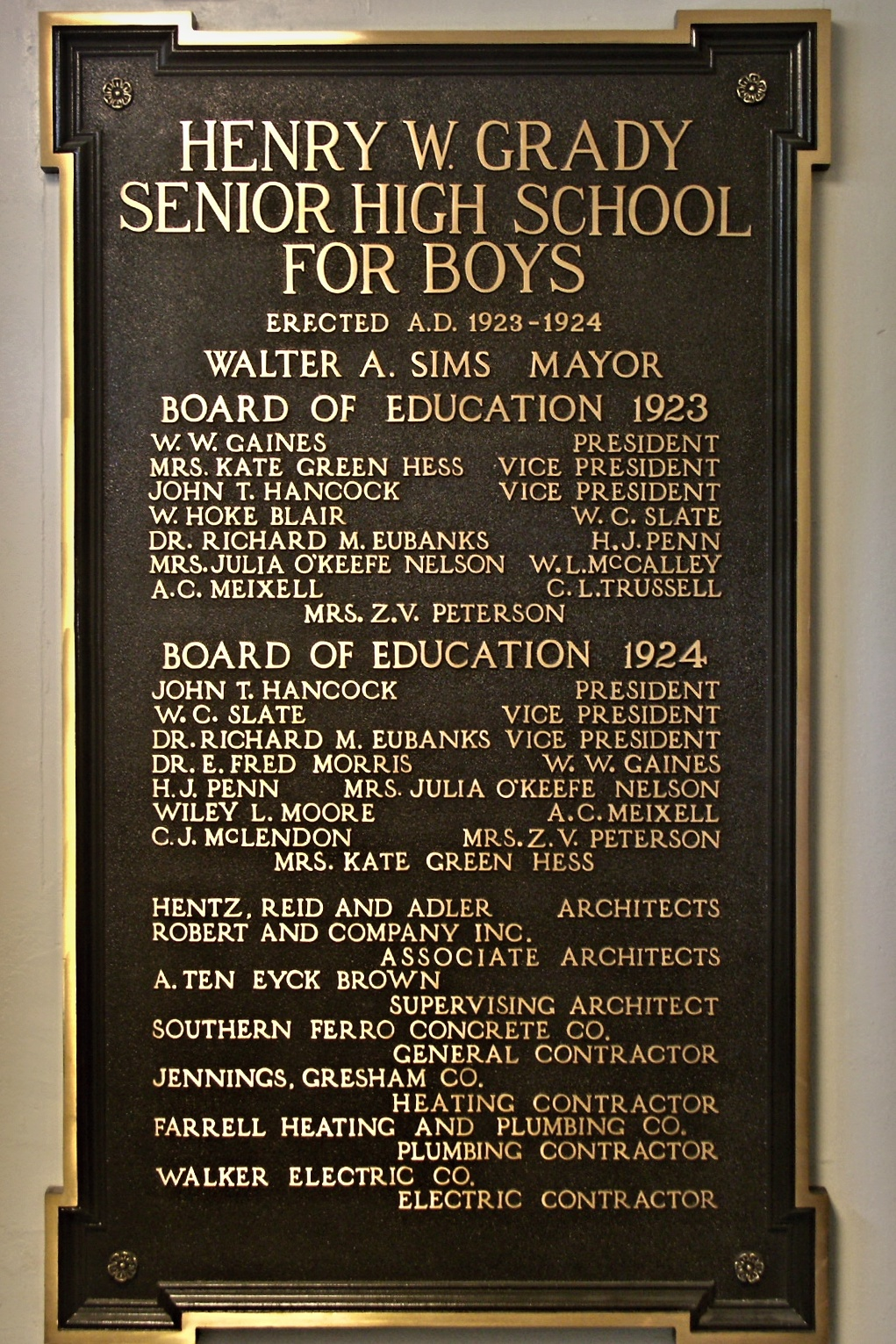
Dedicatory plaque in the 1924 wing

Initially known as Boys High School, it had a Technical Department which expanded in 1909 to become a separate school: Tech High. The "Henry W. Grady Senior High School for Boys" moved to the current campus site in 1924. The 1924 structure (the wing of the campus facing Charles Allen Dr.) still stands, and has been renovated three times (1950, 1987, and 2004). Between 1909 and 1924, Tech High also moved to the campus' current location. Tech High and Boys High merged in 1947 under the name Henry Woodfin Grady High School.

Grady served as the communication magnet in the Atlanta Public Schools system from 1991 until 2011, when the school closed the magnet following a system-wide grant from the Gates Foundation to open small learning communities. From 2011 to 2015, Grady was home to four small learning communities: Communications and Journalism, Public Policy and Justice, Business and Entrepreneurship, and Biomedical Science and Engineering. In 2015, Grady High School course offerings expanded to include the following pathways: Advanced Academic, World Languages, Fine Arts, Instrumental Music, Theatre Arts, Visual Arts, and Career, Technical and Agricultural Education (CTAE). In 2016–17, it was used during the production of the 2017 Marvel Studios film Spider-Man: Homecoming, which is set in the Marvel Cinematic Universe (MCU).

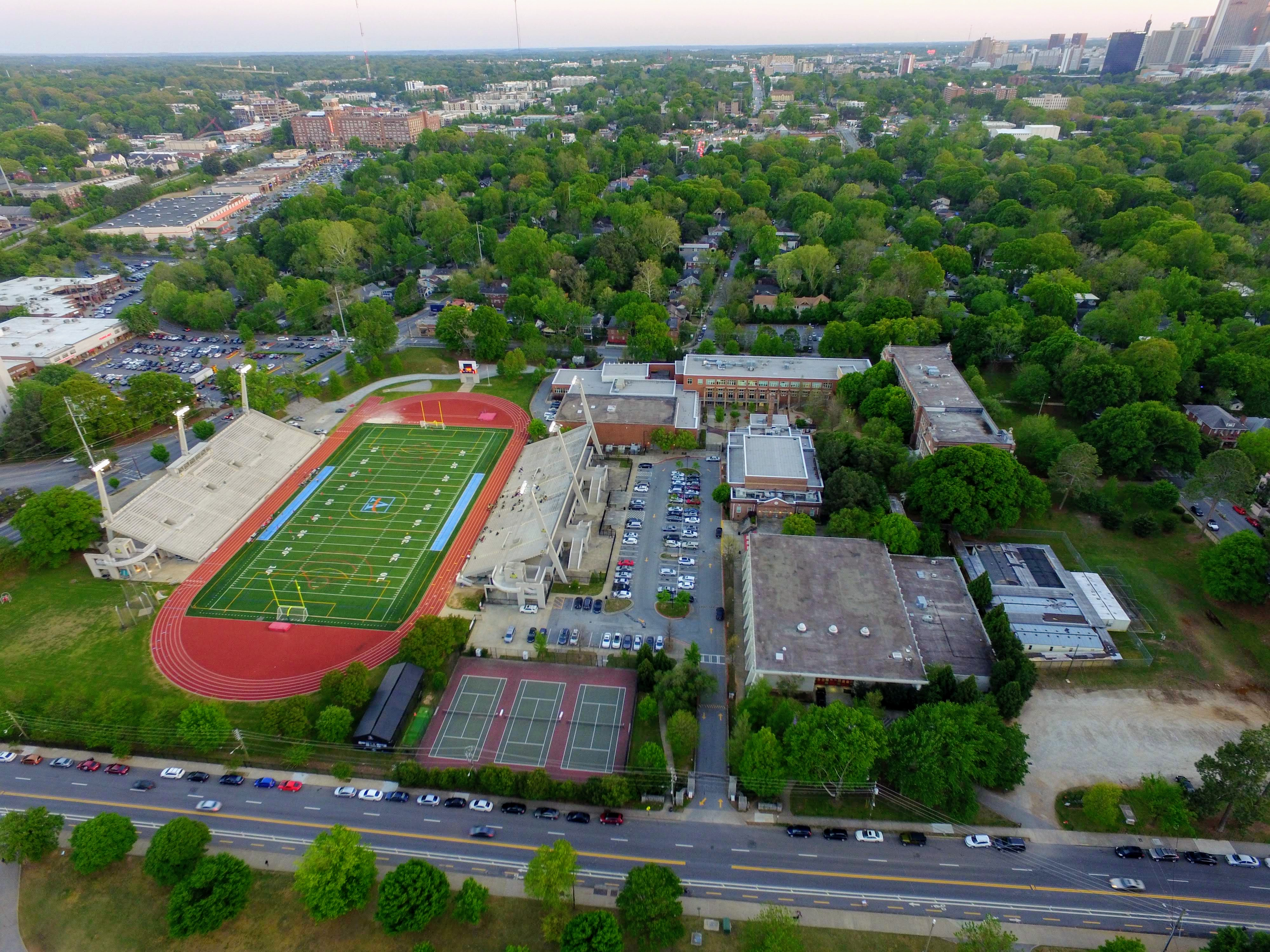
Aerial View of Midtown High School Facing South (Photo 2018)

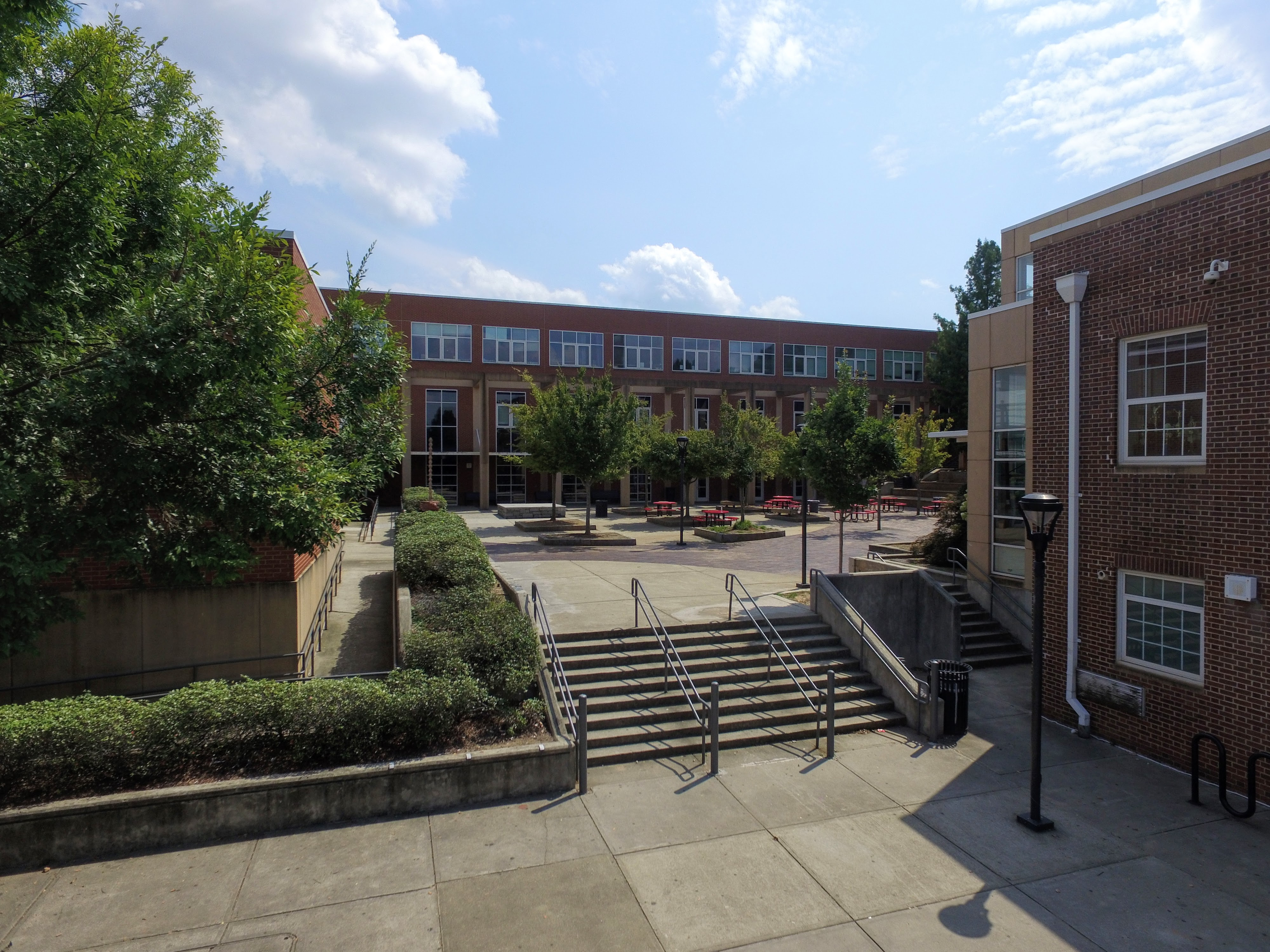
Main Courtyard Entrance Midtown High School from parking lot Pre Perimeter Fence Installation (2018)

=== 2021 renovation and addition ===
In fall 2021, the school opened with a $34.9 million renovation funded by the one-penny Education Special Purpose Local Option Sales Tax (E-SPLOST). Designed by Cooper Carry, this encompassed a 339,192 square foot renovation and 63,063 square foot four-level addition with ten classrooms (to replace modular ones), four industry-certified career, technical and agricultural education spaces, two science labs, a media center, administrative offices and counseling spaces. Improvements to the existing buildings include a larger cafeteria with a school store, and a family living center for students with special needs to learn life skills. New fencing and gating around the campus were added.

=== Controversy over name ===
Grady's advocacy of white supremacy has resulted in his name being removed from a number of institutions. In January 2016, Henry W. Grady Middle School in Houston was renamed.

In February 2016, the school newspaper argued that Henry Grady's name should be removed from the school as well.

In July 2020, the Atlanta Board of Education formed a committee to consider a new name. On December 15, 2020, the Board officially announced the name change to Midtown High School effective June 1, 2021.

== Curriculum and activities ==
=== Arts ===
==== Knights of Sound ====
The school has a band, Knights of Sound Band (made of a marching band, a concert/symphonic band, and a jazz band).

==== Chorus ====
The school also has a chorus.

=== School publications ===
The Unmasking literary magazine was founded in 1988 as a collection of student art, literature, and criticism edited by Midtown students, published every spring. The magazine was named "Best in Show" by the National Scholastic Press Association twice, in 2005 (Seattle) and 2001 (Boston).

The Southerner is a monthly newspaper written by Midtown students. Part of the High School National Ad Network, it has been published since 1947. The Southerner has won numerous awards, such as the Pacemaker Award and the Quill & Scroll Award, earning the publication nationwide acclaim.

Nexus, written by Midtown students, was a bimonthly magazine. Its success in the 2004–2005 school year was at first limited, with only a handful of editions, as that was its first year and it started late. In its second year (2005–2006) it gained the Start-Up achievement award from the Georgia Scholastic Press Association. In the 2008–2009 school year Nexus won "All Southern" from SIPA.

The Orator, Midtown's annual yearbook publication has published every year since 1951. The library retains copies of every book and the yearbook is primarily created in one of the school's publication classes in the journalism track offered to students.

Grady News Now (now known as knight view) and Gametime were Midtown High School's programs in broadcast journalism, and are also recipients of many awards. GNN won its first Pacemaker in November 2005. Gametime is a weekly show dedicated to the coverage of prevalent sports stories as well as scores and highlights from all scholastic athletic events. It won the GSPA (Georgia Scholastic Press Association) award for the best new breakthrough production.

=== Sports ===
- Fall sports
  - Water polo - boys' and girls'
  - Cheerleading
  - Cross-country
  - Football – varsity and junior varsity (1953 State Champions)
  - Softball
  - Volleyball
- Winter sports
  - Swimming
  - Basketball
  - Cheerleading
  - Debate – novice, JV and varsity
  - Riflery – co-ed
- Spring sports
  - Baseball – varsity and JV
  - Golf
  - Lacrosse - varsity (boys and girls)
  - Soccer - Grady soccer teams compete in region 5-AAA.
  - Tennis
  - Track (boys and girls)
  - Ultimate frisbee - boys' and girls' varsity and JV (2012, 2017, 2018, 2019 varsity Boys state champions, 2018 Varsity Boys National Champions) Ultimate frisbee was a club sport prior to 2024.

== Demographics of student body ==
As of October 2024, the school had 1,696 students.

- 43% were Caucasian.
- 37% were African-American.
- 9% were Hispanic.
- 7% were multiracial.
- 3% were Asian.

== In popular culture ==
Several rap videos have been shot on campus, including videos by popular artists Dem Franchize Boyz, Freak Nasty, B5 and Outkast. In 2011, the campus hosted MTV's hit show Teen Wolf as it made its television debut. Several movies have been shot on campus, including Remember the Titans, Ride Along, The Duff, Love, Simon, Spider-Man: Homecoming, Spider-Man: Far From Home, and Spider-Man: No Way Home.

== Notable alumni ==
- Ivan Allen Jr. (1929) Mayor of Atlanta
- Jim Bagby, Jr. (1935) Former professional baseball player for the Boston Red Sox, Cleveland Indians, and Pittsburgh Pirates
- Charles Alvin Beckwith (1947) Special Forces officer credited with founding Delta Force
- Red Borom (1935) former professional baseball player for the Detroit Tigers
- Hugh Casey (1932) Former professional baseball player for the Chicago Cubs, Brooklyn Dodgers, Pittsburgh Pirates, and New York Yankees
- Clint Castleberry, former college football player and U.S. Army Air Force Lieutenant
- S. Truett Cathy (1939) Chick-fil-A founder (Boys High)
- Josie Duffy Rice (2005) Former President of The Appeal and a writer and criminal justice expert.
- Danielle Deadwyler (2000) Actress and writer known for her roles in Atlanta, The Haves and the Have Nots, Station Eleven, The Harder They Fall and the upcoming Till.
- Stuart Eizenstat (1960) Policy advisor for the Carter and Clinton presidential administrations
- Franklin Garrett (1924) Historian of Atlanta
- Jerry Green (1955) Former professional football player for the Boston Patriots
- Harris Hines (1961) Chief Justice, State of Georgia Supreme Court
- Lorenza Izzo (2008) Actress and model
- Yolanda King (1972) Daughter of Martin Luther King Jr.
- Elliott Levitas (1948) Former U.S. Congressman
- Marty Marion (1936) Former professional baseball player for the St. Louis Cardinals and St. Louis Browns; former manager for the St. Louis Cardinals, St. Louis Browns, and Chicago White Sox)
- Earthwind Moreland (1995) Professional football player for the New England Patriots
- Nolen Richardson Former professional baseball player for the Detroit Tigers, New York Yankees, and Cincinnati Reds
- Eric Roberts (1974) Academy Award-nominated actor
- Dean Rusk (1924) Secretary of State from 1961 to 1969
- Adam Schultz (2002) Chief Official White House Photographer from 2021-present
- John M. Slaton (1880) Governor of Georgia from 1913 to 1915
- Supreeme Former hip-hop group whose members include Shaka "Tom Cruz" Girvan aka Dope Pope, Negashi Armada, and Sam "King Self" Terrell
- Damian Swann (2011) Professional football player for the New Orleans Saints
- Faye Webster (2015) Musician
- Allen West (1979) C/LTC of the 1979 ROTC class, US Congressman from Florida
- Donald Windham (1937) Playwright, editor, novelist, short-story writer, and memoirist; known for such works as The Dog Star, Emblems of Conduct, The Warm Country, and Two People; grew up on Peachtree Street
- Bronte Woodard (1958) Wrote and adapted screenplay for the movie Grease
- George W. Woodruff (1913) Former Director of Coca-Cola Company, philanthropist
- Nate Wiggins (2021) Professional football player for the Baltimore Ravens
