= Kirkwood, Atlanta =

Neighborhood of Atlanta, Georgia

Coordinates: 33.752095°N 84.323668°W

Kirkwood is a nationally designated historic neighborhood on the east side of Atlanta, Georgia, United States. It is an historic streetcar suburb situated entirely in DeKalb County, bordered by the neighborhoods of Lake Claire, East Lake, Edgewood, and Oakhurst. Kirkwood is bound on the north by DeKalb Avenue, on the south by Memorial Drive and Interstate 20, on the west by Montgomery Street, and on the east by 1st Ave. A large part of the neighborhood is listed on the National Register of Historic Places as Kirkwood Historic District.

== History ==
Prior to the Civil War, the most prominent landholders in early Kirkwood were the Kirkpatrick, Dunwoody, and Clay families. The name Kirkwood was likely derived from a blending of the Kirkpatrick and Dunwoody family names.

James H. Kirkpatrick (1778–1853), a native of Ireland, settled in the area in 1827 and acquired Land Lots 111 and 112 in what are now the north Kirkwood and Lake Claire neighborhoods. His plantation estate was located just to the north of Georgia Railroad line near the vicinity of East Lake Road. At the time of his death, James Kirkpatrick's personal estate was considered one of the largest in DeKalb County.

Jesse Clay (1792–1871), a native of Virginia, operated dairy farms on over 850 acres in Land Lots 206 and 207, in the southwest corner of the Kirkwood neighborhood. The Clay farmstead was located near present-day Clay Street. In addition to farming, Jesse Clay, his sons, and his brother Green Clay also speculated in land development throughout the nineteenth and early twentieth centuries. Aside from Gilliam Park, which was once a part of their property, the only vestige of the Clay family in Kirkwood today is the small, late nineteenth-century family cemetery located on the west side of Clifton Street NE, between Wade Street and Hosea L. Williams Drive.

Kirkwood traces its beginnings to residential development begun in the 1870s. Described in an early tour book as an "area of beautiful suburban villas", Kirkwood was an early streetcar suburb of Atlanta. By 1910, streetcars provided express service to and from Atlanta three times daily, and streetcars continued service along some streets including Kirkwood Road NE until the early 1950s.

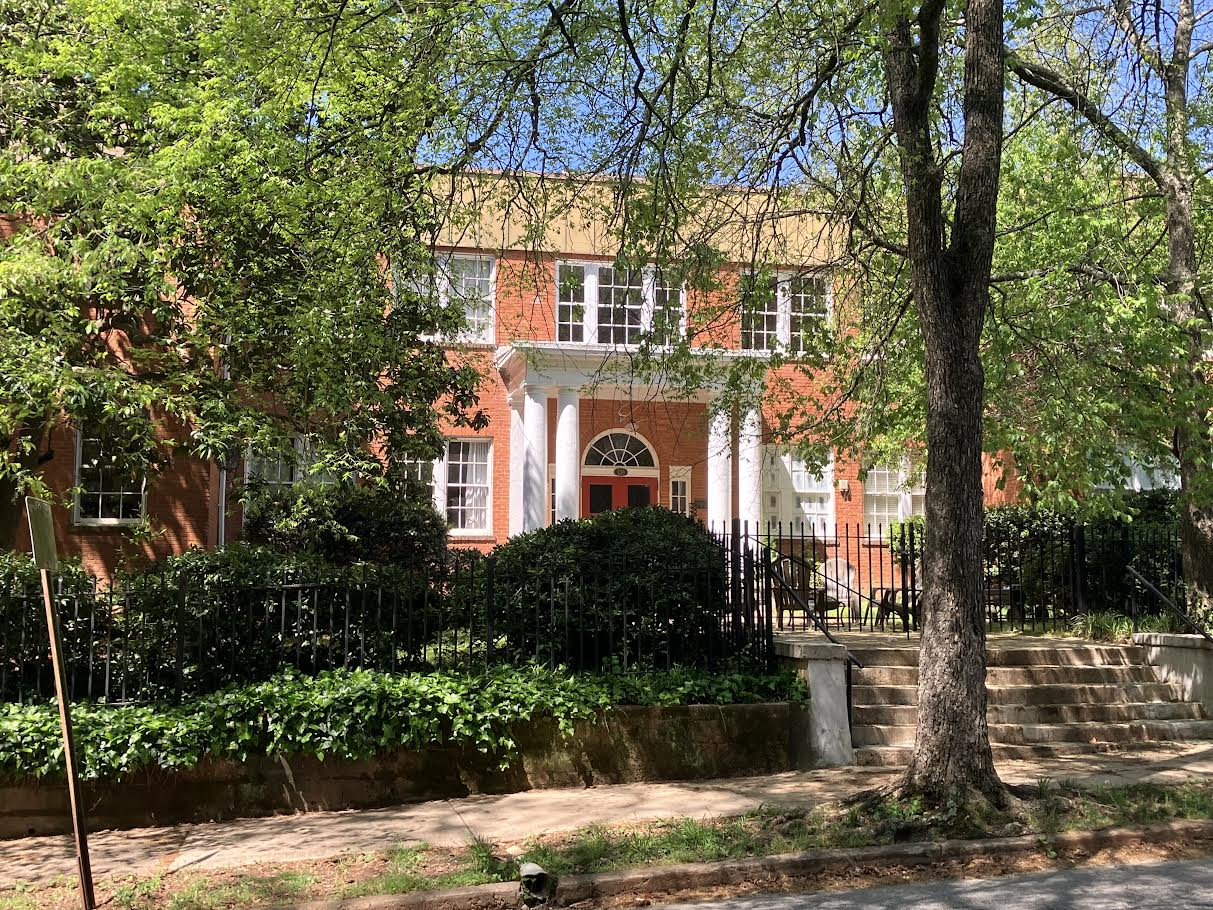
Kirkwood Lofts (April 2025)

Kirkwood was incorporated as an independent municipality in 1899. Governed beginning in 1899 by its own city council and mayor, the town boasted its own water system, school systems, and fire department. The former Kirkwood School is a handsome building from this period, located on Kirkwood Road NE just north of Bessie Branham Park. Individually nominated to the National Register of Historic Places, the primary building on the property's south side was originally designed by John Francis Downing, son of the noted Atlanta architect W. T. Downing. Both buildings now comprise the Kirkwood Lofts apartments as a result of a $1 million renovation in 1997.

=== Civil War history ===
There are five Historic Markers placed by the Georgia Historical Commission detailing major events during the Battle of Atlanta during the Civil War and examining what a pivotal role the area played in the events that unfolded.

The Marker "Unexpected Clash" at the intersection of Clifton Street and Memorial Drive details a surprise encounter sparking some of the first shots fired in the Battle of Atlanta.

The Marker "Battle of Atlanta Began Here" located near the intersection of Memorial Drive and Clay Streets marks the first two brigades of the North and South that would set off for the battle that would leave countless soldiers and civilians dead and lead to the burning of Atlanta.

=== Demographic shifts ===
Since its inception in the late 1800s to the early 1960s, Kirkwood was almost entirely made up of White working-class residents. In the early 1960s, lower-working-class Blacks started to move into the neighborhood due to their housing being demolished because of freeway construction and other federal urban renewal projects. By 1967, Kirkwood was almost entirely Black. For many years following 1967, crime and blight plagued the area. However, around the late 1990s, there was a strong interest to revitalize the neighborhood thanks to better amenities and investments growing in the city. By 2020, Kirkwood gradually changed from majority Black back to majority White. Also the neighborhood began to attract significantly more middle-class and upper-middle-class residents of all races.

== Downtown Kirkwood ==
While Kirkwood's residential community began to flourish by the late 1990s, the community's business district running along Hosea L. Williams Dr. (Then Boulevard Dr.) remained stagnant. A major problem with any planning efforts gaining traction to raise the quality of the downtown area was the fact that properties along the district had varying zoning designations governing their density and use. In 2001, the community obtained Neighborhood Commercial (NC-3) Zoning that allowed for consistency in planning efforts.

In 2003, work began on Phase I of a $1.5M streetscape project in the district that, coupled with earlier zoning changes, served to create an environment that would attract small business and private commercial development to the area. The streetscape project increased pedestrian access by narrowing street crossings, slowing traffic, installing protected crosswalks and bicycle lanes on Hosea Williams, and building wider decorative sidewalks. The visual element of the project added historic street lighting, removal of several power poles, decorative brick pavers, trash cans and bike racks.

Today, Downtown Kirkwood has become what neighbors call "the small town in the big city," hosting its own post office, newly constructed fire station, police precinct and public library. Residents and visitors also have a host of shopping and dining options at their disposal, including: day spas, furniture galleries, gift shops, restaurants, bars, a wine store, coffee shops, real estate offices, professional/creative spaces, salons, dance studios, yoga studios, and more.

The Kirkwood Business Owners' Association (KBOA) represents local businesses and recently installed new gateway signage and landscaping at the main traffic island on Hosea Williams Drive. The KBOA also promotes and markets Kirkwood Events and businesses.

The Kirkwood Historic District, including 1,788 contributing buildings, was listed on the National Register of Historic Places in 2009.

== Festivals & events ==
- Kirkwood Spring Fling: Each year the KNO ushers in the warm weather with its annual Spring Fling Festival and Tour of Homes. Local residents can sample music, artist market, food, beer and children's area at Bessie Brahnam Park. Proceeds from the event are committed to local community improvement projects.
- Kirkwood Wine Stroll: The Kirkwood Business Owners Association hosts an annual Wine Stroll each fall where attendees can sample wines from around the world at local businesses.
- Kirkwood Family Find: The Kirkwood Neighborhood and Resonate Church put on this Easter Egg Hunt with 8,000 eggs at Bessie Branham Park. Activities include face painting, games, and more. It has occurred yearly the Saturday before Easter.
- Kirkwood Home For the Holidays: The Kirkwood Neighborhood and Resonate Church celebrate the holidays with a tree lighting, live music, holiday market, and Santa at this downtown Kirkwood event every year.
- B*ATL Event:: Held each July in commemoration of the area's geographical role as the starting point of the Battle of Atlanta during the civil war, Kirkwood, East Atlanta and East Lake host the B*ATL celebration across their communities. Events include a Gala Dinner and House Tour, a 5K run, van and walking tours, a re-creation of the Frontlines with Re-enactment Soldiers and artillery, a Civil War Village with civilian re-enactors, historic music concerts and dramatic performances, story telling and more.

== Architecture ==
Historic Kirkwood hosts a large stock of Victorian and Craftsman style homes along with new homes in traditional styles. In 2009 The Kirkwood Neighbors' Organization, in conjunction with the state historic preservation office and the faculty and students of the Georgia State University Heritage Preservation program, successfully nominated the Kirkwood Historic District to the National Register of Historic Places. With nearly 2000 contributing resources, the Kirkwood Historic District is the largest historic district in the State of Georgia in terms of contributing resources.

Listed on the National Register of Historic Places in 2002, the Kirkwood School was originally constructed in 1910 with additional buildings added in the following decades. The school was converted to loft apartments and serve as an excellent example of preservation methods and adaptive re-use. In 2005 the 21 apartment units were sold as loft condominiums. The Craftsman Bungalow, the most prominent architectural home style in Kirkwood reflects the areas growth throughout the community's early 20th century as a streetcar suburb of bustling Atlanta. The style was renowned for its simple lines and down-to-earth functionality, a clear departure from the grandeur of earlier Victorian homes of the late 19th century. Local Architect Frank Ruggles, a Boston-born transplant to turn of the 20th century Kirkwood exercised the craftsman influence in many of his unique designs throughout the neighborhood. Many of the Ruggles-designed homes can still be seen along Warlick Avenue and along much of Howard Street NE. Urban pioneers revered the essence of these simpler times and today the community's craftsman homes are highly sought after, fetching a premium on resale.

In addition to the large stock of historic homes, one of Kirkwood's greatest attributes is its capacity for new homes that meet the needs of modern living while maintaining the traditional fabric of the surrounding community. Since the mid-1990s, Kirkwood has experienced a surge of new single family homes through infill development on existing lots and the construction of small enclaves, such as Hawthorn Park. Additional projects on the horizon include three new subdivisions totaling approximately 50 homes with continued infill development.

Although there are not currently any historic protections in place for the community at large, The Kirkwood Neighbors' Organization and Neighborhood Planning Unit-O work closely with developers, builders and the City of Atlanta to ensure that new development is sensitive to a variety of needs throughout the community.

== Education ==
Residents are zoned to campuses in the Atlanta Public Schools district .

- Fred A. Toomer Elementary School
- Charles Drew Charter School
- Martin Luther King Jr. Middle School
- Maynard H. Jackson High School

== Parks and greenspace ==
Kirkwood is home to five of Atlanta's public parks that are situated throughout the neighborhood. Additionally, Kirkwood is working to establish the Eastside Greenway; a series of linear parks, greenspace and urban trail network traversing the neighborhood. The "Trolley Line" of the PATH (Atlanta) network also crosses the community along much of Hosea Williams Drive and Woodbine Avenue.

Gilliam Park: Jesse Clay, the first owner of the land, is thought to have emigrated from Bradford County, Virginia and first settled in Jasper County, Georgia, where he shows on the Federal Census of 1820 along with his wife, children, and six slaves. He purchased Land Lots 206 and 207 of the 15th District, DeKalb County, from Taylor & Watts of Jasper County in 1826. He made the final payment on the land after traveling to South Carolina and back by horseback. He initially lived on the property in a tent and drew water from a spring at Wade's Place Hollow (now Gilliam Park).

He cleared and farmed approximately 850 acres (3.4 km^{2}) that ranged from the curve of Gilliam Park south to Memorial Drive until his death in 1871. His son Cleveland, a Confederate veteran of the Civil War, inherited the land. The majority of the land was first subdivided and sold to the Atlanta Suburban Land Company in 1892 with the family retaining the Clay home at Boulevard Dekalb (now Hosea Williams Drive) between Clay and Wyman Streets, the family burial grounds nearby, and other parcels.

The sale was prompted by increased Kirkwood development following installation of one of Atlanta's first trolley lines in the early 1870s. That line's right of way bordered soon to be Gilliam Park and explains the curved shape of the park's border. In the late 1910s consolidation of the many electric trolley companies in Atlanta led to the founding of today's Georgia Power Company. The Atlanta Suburban Land Company held the park parcel until approximately 1922, when they collapsed during a land fraud scandal.

Between 1922 and 1924 the City of Kirkwood (incorporated in 1892) was annexed in a long and at times contentious political and legislative process. General practice lawyer Rufus F. Gilliam, a former mayor of Kirkwood, was an active proponent of annexation. He lived on nearby Rogers Street with his wife Elsa and son Edwin.

The annexation agreement between the two cities included a commitment by Atlanta to create city parks in Kirkwood. Today's park was acquired from the many parcels available after failure of the Atlanta Suburban Land Company and named after Mr. Gilliam. It has remained in Atlanta's park inventory since. The park currently features green space, a bike trail (as part of the PATH (Atlanta) project), and a community garden.

Coan Park: Also situated along the old trolley line, Coan Park features an accessible playground allowing disabled children use of play equipment. Installed in 2011 the Coan Park Outdoor Gym provides resistance work out equipment that citizens can use. The park is also home to Coan Recreation Center, Coan Baseball Field, basketball court, several tennis courts and entertainment gazebo. The park is on the border of Edgewood and Kirkwood neighborhoods.

Coan Park originally was the Woodbine Neighborhood Club. Formed in the late 1940s, neighbors in the surrounding area bought shares to pay for the land. Contractors volunteered their labor and equipment to build a baseball/football field, basketball court and picnic area. The Atlanta Transit Company donated two old streetcars to serve as a clubhouse and meeting place. The Atlanta Crackers donated catcher's equipment for the baseball team. The park served the neighborhood until it was transitioned to Coan Park.

Bessie Branham Park (Formerly Kirkwood Park):Bessie Branham and her husband were leading citizens of Kirkwood in the early 20th century. Mr. Branham was in the publishing business. Mrs. Branham was a civic leader involved in women's and children's activities.

In the 1920s Mrs. Branham purchased the land that is now Bessie Branham Park and gave it to the city of Atlanta with the understanding that it would be developed as a public park. The City of Atlanta developed the park and named it after Mrs. Branham.

In 1998, Bessie Branham Park was renovated with new tennis/basketball courts, a ball field, and playground as well as a $2 million recreational center. The recreation center has a gym, workout equipment, and a state-of-the-art computer center with classes that are free to Atlanta residents. The park also features Atlanta's only Urban Treehouse that was constructed under a US Forest Service program to increase the awareness of inner-city youth to nature.

In 2002, the city of Atlanta removed a majority of the existing play structures at Bessie Branham Park without any budget or intent to replace it. The KNO, in conjunction with KABOOM!, and with the assistance of over 700 volunteers from corporate sponsors completed the design, funding and building of a new playground in 2003.

Kirkwood Urban Forest and Community Garden: Community members banded together to transform 7 acres of neglected land into a park and community garden. Located on the old site of Dixie St SE's eastern branch, it is classified by the City of Atlanta as a conservation park, meaning, "Conservation parks are managed for environmental protection, but open for public access". Uniquely, this land is run by neighborhood volunteers and is generously supported by the local neighborhood organization with additional grants. The urban forest features trails among mixed hardwood trees and a wandering spring-fed creek. The community garden has a young orchard, native rain gardens, frog pond, herb beds, shade garden, personal plots, and an unusually large vermicomposting area. There are future plans for a large community pavilion, a small playground, and continued removal of invasive species.

Oakview 1 Park: Pocket park located in the median of Oakview Road SE from Palatka Street SE to Rocky Ford Street SE.

Oakview 2 Park: Pocket park located in the median of Oakview Road SE from Hosea L. Williams Drive NE to Second Ave NE and the city limits.

DeKalb Memorial Park: Located at the southern edge of the neighborhood, border by Memorial Drive SE to the north, Interstate 20 to the south, Clifton Street SE to the west, and Wilkinson Drive SE to the east. The park offers 2 tennis courts, 1 basketball court, open athletic field, baseball and softball fields, and a disc golf course.

== Filming ==
In 2018 Kirkwood was a filming location for Goosebumps 2: Haunted Halloween. It started in early March and was spotted repeatedly in the neighborhood. Additional signs were up on March 22. Outside Kirkwood, signs were placed in Decatur on the 21st. A major trick-or-treating scene was shot back in Kirkwood on the 26th.

== Notable people ==
- Hosea Williams
- Future
- Stacey Abrams
- Inky Johnson
- Young Scooter
- Homixide Meechie

== See also ==
- Ann's Snack Bar
- Gentrification of Atlanta
- Pullman Yard
