= Racial segregation in Atlanta =

Racial segregation in Atlanta has known many phases after the freeing of the slaves in 1865: a period of relative integration of businesses and residences; Jim Crow laws and official residential and de facto business segregation after the Atlanta Race Riot of 1906; blockbusting and black residential expansion starting in the 1950s; and gradual integration from the late 1960s onwards. A 2015 study conducted by Nate Silver of fivethirtyeight.com, found that Atlanta was the second most segregated city in the U.S. and the most segregated in the South.

== Post-Civil War ==
=== De facto residential segregation ===
After the war ended, Atlanta received migrants from surrounding counties, as well as new settlers to the region. Many freedmen moved from plantations to towns or cities for work, including Atlanta; Fulton County went from 20.5 percent black in 1860 to 45.7 percent black in 1870. Many refugees were destitute without even proper clothing or shoes; the American Missionary Association (AMA) helped fill the gap, and the Freedmen's Bureau also offered much help, though erratically.

The destruction of the housing stock by the Union army in the Battle of Atlanta, together with the massive influx of refugees, resulted in a severe housing shortage. 1/8-acre (510 m^{2}) to 1/4-acre (1,000 m^{2}) lots with a small house rented for $5 per month, while those with a glass pane rented for $20. High rents rather than laws led to de facto segregation due to simple economics, with most blacks settling into areas at the edge of the city like Jenningstown (pop. 2,490), Shermantown (2,486) and Summerhill (pop. 1,512), where housing was substandard but rented at rates that were regarded as inflated. Shermantown and Summerhill sat in low-lying areas, prone to flooding and sewage overflows, which resulted in outbreaks of disease in the late 19th century. Housing was substandard; an AMA missionary remarked that many houses were "rickety shacks" rented at inflated rates.

The Fifth Ward, now the Fairlie-Poplar district and areas north of it, was home to the greatest number of blacks before the war, but dropped to third place (pop. 2,436) among black neighborhoods by 1870. Mechanicsville would develop as an additional black neighborhood in the 1870s.

== Race Riot and aftermath ==
=== Jim Crow laws ===
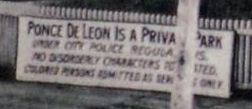
Sign at entrance to Ponce de Leon amusement park in 1908 indicating "colored persons admitted as servants only"

Jim Crow laws were passed in swift succession in the years following the Atlanta Race Riot in 1906. The result was in some cases segregated facilities, with nearly always inferior conditions for black customers, but in many cases it resulted in no facilities at all available to blacks, e.g. all parks were designated whites-only (although a private park, Joyland, did open in 1921). In 1910, the city council passed an ordinance requiring that restaurants be designated for one race only, hobbling black restaurant owners who had been attracting both black and white customers. In the same year, Atlanta's streetcars were segregated, with black patrons required to sit in the rear. If not enough seats were available for all white riders, the blacks sitting furthest forward in the trolley were required to stand and give their seats to whites. In 1913, the city created official boundaries for white and black residential areas. And in 1920, the city prohibited black-owned salons from serving white women and children.

Beyond this, blacks were subject to the South's racial protocol, whereby, according to the New Georgia Encyclopedia: The full extent of segregation in Atlanta included schools, neighborhoods, street repair, police and fire services, and politics is evident through the twentieth century. (Source: Ronald H. Bayor, Race and the Shaping of Twentieth Century Atlanta (University of North Carolina Press, 1996)

all blacks were required to pay obeisance to all whites, even those whites of low social standing. And although they were required to address whites by the title "sir," blacks rarely received the same courtesy themselves. Because even minor breaches of racial etiquette often resulted in violent reprisals, the region's codes of deference transformed daily life into a theater of ritual, where every encounter, exchange, and gesture reinforced black inferiority.

=== Gone with the Wind premiere ===
On December 15, 1939, Atlanta hosted the premiere of Gone with the Wind, the movie based on Atlanta resident Margaret Mitchell's best-selling novel. Stars Clark Gable, Vivien Leigh, and Olivia de Havilland were in attendance. The premiere was held at Loew's Grand Theatre, at Peachtree and Forsyth Streets, current site of the Georgia-Pacific building. An enormous crowd, numbering 300,000 people according to the Atlanta Constitution, filled the streets on this ice-cold night in Atlanta.

==== Absence of film's black stars at event ====
Noticeably absent was Hattie McDaniel, who would win the Academy Award for Best Supporting Actress for her role as Mammy, as well as Butterfly McQueen (Prissy). The black actors were barred from attending the premiere, from appearing in the souvenir program, and from all the film's advertising in the South. Director David Selznick had attempted to bring McDaniel to the premiere, but MGM advised him not to. Clark Gable angrily threatened to boycott the premiere, but McDaniel convinced him to attend anyway. McDaniel did attend the Hollywood debut thirteen days later, and was featured prominently in the program.

==== Controversial participation of Martin Luther King ====
Martin Luther King Jr. sang at the gala as part of a children's choir of his father's church, Ebenezer Baptist. The boys dressed as pickaninnies and the girls wore "Aunt Jemima"-style bandanas, dress seen by many Black people as humiliating. John Wesley Dobbs tried to dissuade Rev. King Sr. from participating at the whites-only event, and Rev. King Sr. was harshly criticized in the black community.

=== Blockbusting and racial transition in neighborhoods ===
In the late 1950s, after forced-housing patterns were outlawed, violence, intimidation and organized political pressure was used in some white neighborhoods to discourage blacks from buying homes there. However, by the late 1950s, such efforts proved futile as blockbusting drove whites to sell their homes in neighborhoods such as Adamsville, Center Hill, Grove Park in northwest Atlanta, and white sections of Edgewood and on the east side. In 1962, the city attempted to thwart blockbusting by erecting road barriers in Cascade Heights, countering the efforts of civic and business leaders to foster Atlanta as the "city too busy to hate." This incident would come to be known as "Atlanta's Berlin Wall" or the "Peyton Road Affair."

But efforts to stop transition in Cascade failed too. Neighborhoods of new black homeowners took root, helping alleviate the enormous strain of the lack of housing available to African Americans. Atlanta's western and southern neighborhoods transitioned to majority black — between 1950 and 1970 the number of census tracts that were at least ninety percent black tripled. East Lake, Kirkwood, Watts West Road, Reynoldstown, Almond Park, Mozley Park, Center Hill and Cascade Heights underwent an almost total transition from white to black. From 1960 to 1970, the black proportion of the city's population rose from 38 to 51 percent. Meanwhile, during the same decade, the city lost sixty thousand white residents, a 20 percent decline.

White flight and the building of malls in the suburbs triggered a slow decline of downtown as a central shopping district; however, it would continue its role as a government center and add the role of lodging and entertainment center for convention traffic.

=== 1956 Sugar Bowl ===
In January 1956, Bobby Grier became the first black player to participate in the Sugar Bowl. He is also regarded as the first black player to compete at a bowl game in the Deep South, though others such as Wallace Triplett had played in games like the 1948 Cotton Bowl in Dallas. Grier's team, the Pittsburgh Panthers, was set to play against the Georgia Tech Yellow Jackets. However, Georgia's Governor Marvin Griffin beseeched Georgia Tech to not participate in this racially integrated game. Griffin was widely criticized by news media leading up to the game, and protests were held at his mansion by Georgia Tech students. Despite the governor's objections, Georgia Tech upheld the contract and proceeded to compete in the bowl. In the game's first quarter, a pass interference call against Grier ultimately resulted in Yellow Jackets' 7-0 victory. Grier stated that he has mostly positive memories about the experience, including the support from teammates and letters from all over the world.

=== Civil Rights Movement ===
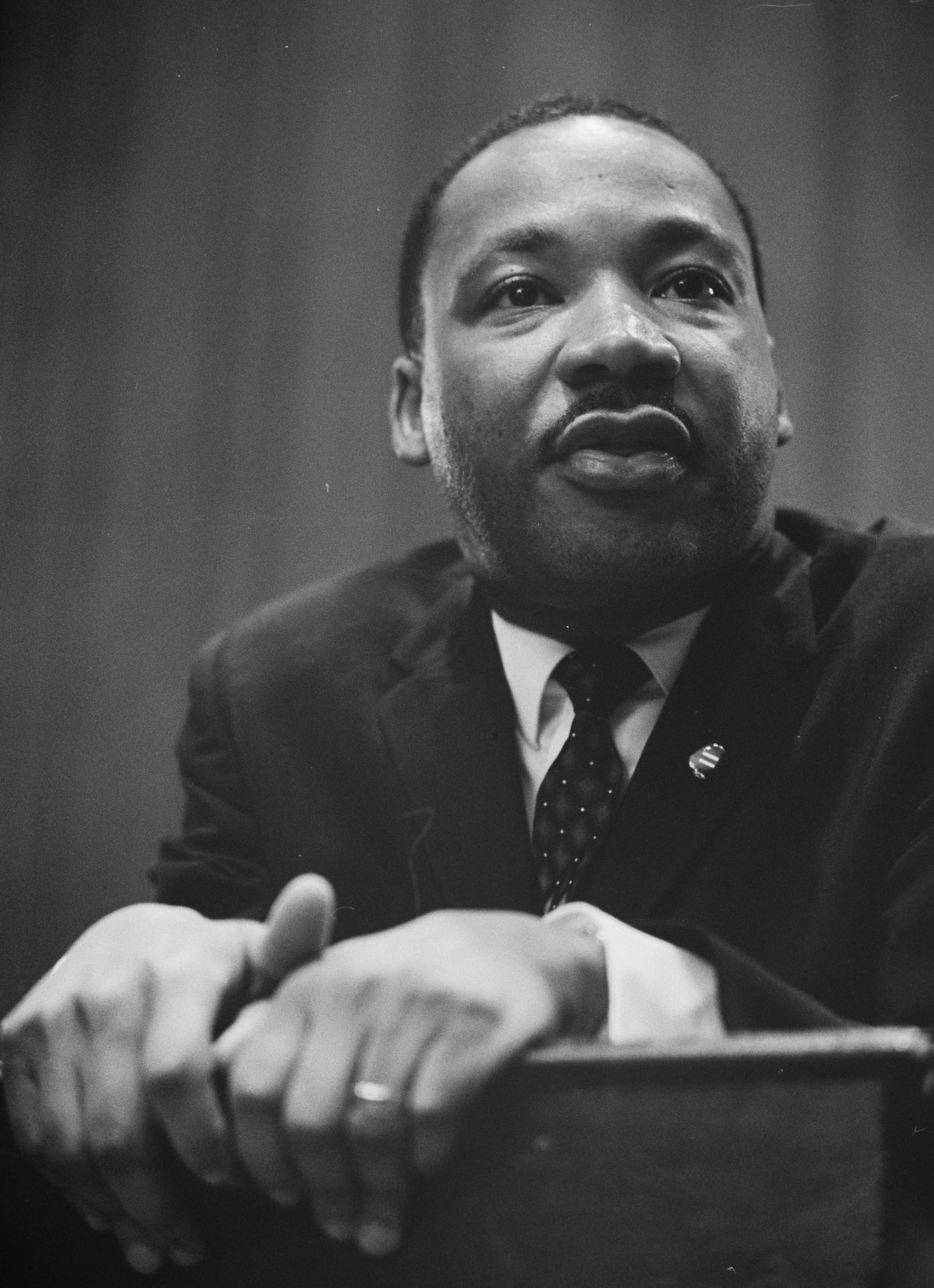
Martin Luther King Jr.

In the wake of the landmark U.S. Supreme Court decision Brown v. Board of Education, which helped usher in the Civil Rights Movement, racial tensions in Atlanta erupted in acts of violence. For example, on October 12, 1958, a Reform Jewish temple on Peachtree Street was bombed. The "Confederate Underground" claimed responsibility. Many believed that Jews, especially those from the northeast, were advocates of the Civil Rights Movement.

In the 1960s, Atlanta was a major organizing center of the Civil Rights Movement, with Martin Luther King Jr. and students from Atlanta's historically black colleges and universities playing major roles in the movement's leadership. On October 19, 1960, a sit-in at the lunch counters of several Atlanta department stores led to the arrest of Dr. King and several students. This drew attention from the national media and from presidential candidate John F. Kennedy.

Despite this incident, Atlanta's political and business leaders fostered Atlanta's image as "the city too busy to hate." While the city mostly avoided confrontation, minor race riots did occur in 1965 and in 1968.

=== Desegregation ===
Desegregation of the public sphere came in stages, with buses and trolleybuses desegregated in 1959, restaurants at Rich's department store in 1961 (though Lester Maddox's Pickrick restaurant famously remained segregated through 1964), and movie theaters in 1962-3. In 1961, Mayor Ivan Allen Jr. became one of the few Southern white mayors to support desegregation of his city's public schools, although initial compliance was token, and in reality desegregation occurred in stages from 1961 to 1973.

== Current state of residential segregation ==
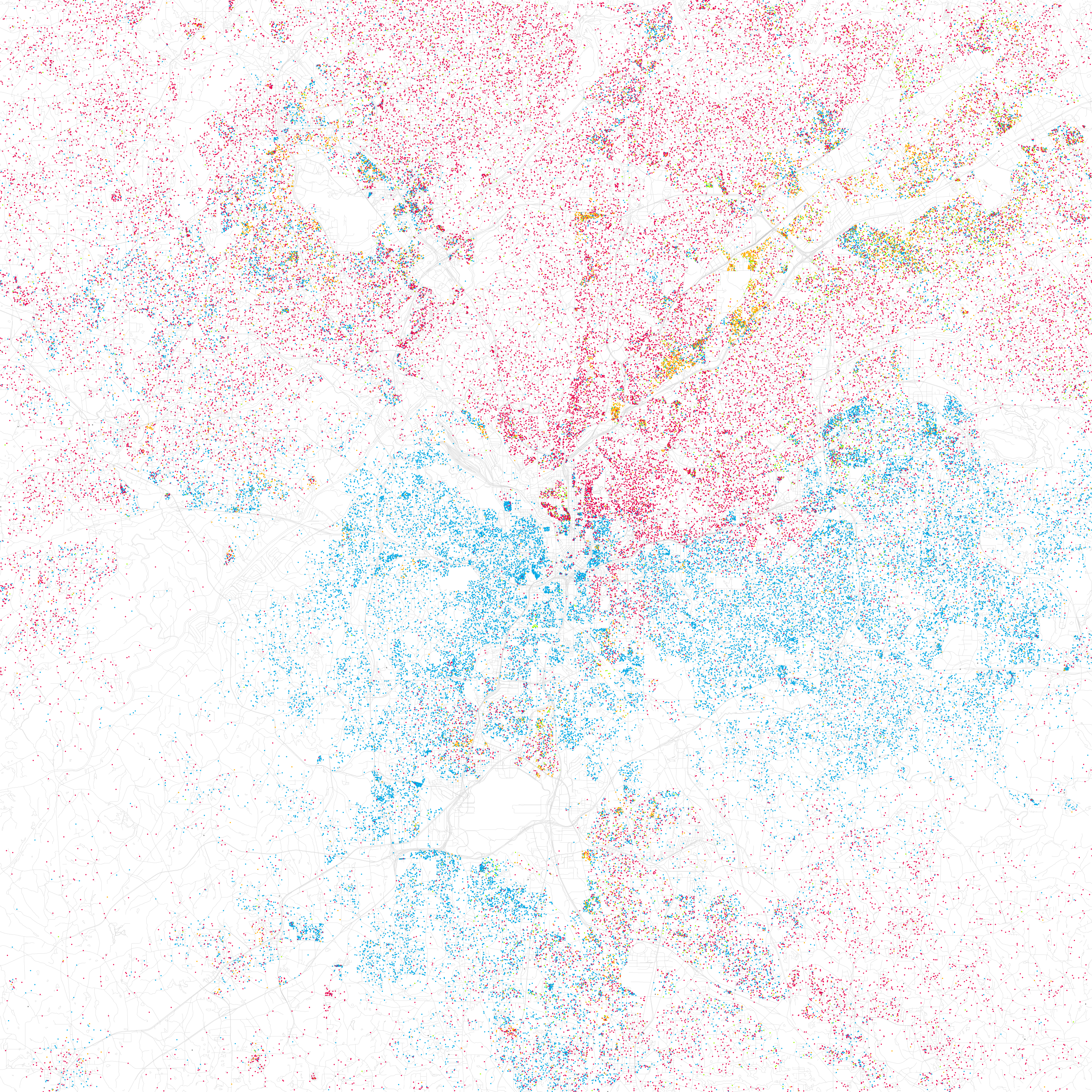
2000 map of race and ethnicity in Atlanta; whites still live largely in the north side of the metro area; blacks in the south

There is no one definitive method for measuring residential segregation, and differing methods reveal different results. In general, the metro area is more integrated than the city of Atlanta. According to the 2000 Census Bureau study, among the fifty largest U.S. cities, Atlanta ranks just below average, with 8.8 percent of residents living on integrated blocks vs. 9.4 percent on average. However, among the twenty cities with the highest proportion of blacks in their populations (Atlanta having the fifth highest percentage), Atlanta ranks second to last, with only Chicago having fewer residents (5.7 percent) living on integrated blocks.

Metro Atlanta ranked high in a 2000 measure of residents living on integrated blocks, at 18.4 percent ranking 14th among the 100 largest U.S. metropolitan areas. However measured by a longstanding "dissimilarity index", Metro Atlanta ranked 63rd out of 100. In a study that measured how many Metro Atlanta blacks lived on blocks that were at least 20 percent black and 20 percent white, Metro Atlanta ranked at the lower end of the group of more heavily black metro areas, at 25.8 percent. Nevertheless, Metro Atlanta had one of the highest proportions of whites living on blocks that were at least 20 percent black and 20 percent white, with its tally of 14.1 percent ranking eleventh out of 100.

Within metropolitan Atlanta, racial residential segregation tends to be more prominent in highly urbanized counties in comparison to more suburban counties. DeKalb county and Fulton county, which are the most urban counties in metro Atlanta are the most segregated of the ten counties that constitute the metro area according to the Atlanta Regional Commission. Atlanta's Black population continues to be centralized in older urban neighborhoods and isolated from the growing number of employment opportunities that are becoming increasingly available in the suburban regions of the city as urban sprawl in the metro area increases. The continued racial residential segregation in Atlanta is also affected by racial stereotyping and race-based perceptions. In regards to prejudice and racial segregation, negative racial stereotypes and the fear of group threat from Black residents contribute to white resistance to integration while negative racial stereotypes and the perception of whites as being discriminatory contribute to black resistance to integrate. Racial residential segregation in metro Atlanta is also highly correlated to economic residential segregation. For census tract groups within Clayton, Cobb, DeKalb, Fulton, and Gwinnett counties, 22.14% of the population is below the poverty level for the block groups that are 81-90% black whereas, for block groups that are 81-90% white, only 1.40% of the population is below the poverty level. For the Hispanic and Asian populations, block groups that are around 31-40% Asian or 41-50% Hispanic tend to have higher poverty rates than blocks with a higher or lower percentage of Hispanic or Asian residents.

Nevertheless, in some ways metro Atlanta has become increasingly more integrated as the dissimilarity index for blacks or African Americans has decreased by 12.5% from 1980 to 2000 and the isolation index has decreased by 4.5%. On the other hand, the dissimilarity index and isolation index increased for Hispanics or Latinos as Atlanta had the second largest increase in residential segregation for Hispanics and Latinos out of the metropolitan statistical areas studied by the US Census Bureau. While Atlanta still maintains a dissimilarity and isolation index for African Americans and a dissimilarity index for Latinos that is higher than average for metropolitan areas in the US, the city's dissimilarity index for black residents is also decreasing at a higher than average rate which reflects the city's growing rate of integration.

Certain areas of the city are predominantly black or white (See also Demographics of Atlanta:Neighborhoods):

- sixty percent of the city's area consists of largely black neighborhoods: together, Northwest, Southwest, and Southeast Atlanta are 92 percent black
- there are some areas that are predominantly white, notably Buckhead and Northeast Atlanta (NPUs F and N: Virginia-Highland, Morningside/Lenox Park, Inman Park, Candler Park, Poncey-Highland, Reynoldstown, Cabbagetown, Lake Claire) which are on average 80% white

Federal complaint filed with Dept of Education, after a Mother learnt her child's principal (Principal Sharyn Briscoe) was segregating children based upon their skin color.
