= Atlanta Beltline =

Rail trail under construction in Atlanta, Georgia, USA

- The BeltLine passing near Krog Street in 2026.
- Formation: April 2005 (21 years ago)
- Legal status: Georgia non-profit
- Purpose: Urban redevelopment and mobility
- Location: Atlanta, Georgia
- President and Chief Executive Officer (ABI), Executive Director (ABP): Clyde Higgs (ABI), Rob Brawner (ABP)
- Main organ: Atlanta Beltline Inc. (ABI) and Atlanta Beltline Partnership (ABP)
- Website: beltline.org

The Atlanta Beltline is a 22-mile (35 km) long multi-use trail on a former railway corridor that encircles the core of Atlanta, Georgia. The Atlanta Beltline is designed to reconnect neighborhoods and communities historically divided and marginalized by infrastructure, improve transportation, add green space, promote redevelopment, create and preserve affordable housing, and showcase arts and culture. As of 2026, the Atlanta Beltline is recognized as the world's longest linear arboretum. The project is in varying stages of development, with several mainline and spur trails complete. Since the passage of the More MARTA sales tax in 2016, construction of the light rail streetcar system is overseen by MARTA in close partnership with Atlanta Beltline, Inc.

The Beltline connects to MARTA's first bus rapid transit (BRT) line, which began service on April 18, 2026. The 5-mile (8.0 km) line runs from downtown Atlanta, through Summerhill, and ends at the Beltline. The BRT line named the "MARTA Rapid Summerhill", will utilize new 60-foot (18 m) articulated electric buses.

In June 2026, the Beltline launched ATL Spoke, a 12-month pilot service of an autonomous shuttle. It will connect West End station, the Atlanta Beltline Southwest Trail and destinations throughout the Lee and White streets district.

== History ==
Location of some trail entrances around Intown Atlanta

=== As railroad rights-of-way ===
The name "Beltline" and its development is connected to Atlanta's historical association with railroads. During post-Civil War reconstruction, Atlanta began to industrialize, unlike most of the South. Those new factory and other industrial jobs attracted workers to Atlanta, rapidly increasing the city's population. Since both travelers and industry regularly utilized railroads, the increased demand on the existing railroad infrastructure created the need for additional rail infrastructure. In response, a "belt" of railway was proposed to bypass the busy downtown railway system and alleviate rail congestion.

After roughly 30 years of development, the "belt" of railway around Atlanta was realized. The railway belt was constructed from four separate railway segments, each owned and operated by different railway companies. In chronological order, the four original belt railway lines were:

- Atlanta and Richmond Air-Line Railway: this line was constructed in the 1870s and became defunct during the 1990s. Coming down from the northeastern corner of Ansley Golf Club, passing alongside Piedmont Park and Ponce City Market, and terminating in the Inman Park neighborhood at the Hulsey Yard, this line spans the Beltline's Northeast and Eastside Trails.
- Seaboard Air Line Railroad: this line was completed in 1892 and is still in operation under CSX. Starting immediately east of the Inman Yard (directly north of Shirley Clarke Franklin Park) and winding east-by-northeast under I-75, Peachtree Road, and I-85, eventually continuing toward Emory University, this line guides the Beltline's Northwest and Northside Trails. In contrast to the other three railroad rights-of-way comprising the Beltline, as this line is still actively used by railroad traffic, the Northwest and Northside Trails will follow a new route.
- Atlanta & West Point Belt Line Railroad: this line was built in 1899 and became defunct in May 2014. Heading south from the Hulsey Yard in the Oakland City neighborhood and following a southwesterly arc, passing beneath I-75/I-85, and connecting to the tracks along Lee Street SW/U.S. Highway 29, this line spans the Southeast and Southside Trails.
- Louisville & Nashville Railroad Belt Line: though historical documentation is limited, this line was operating in 1902 and is believed to have become defunct in the mid-1980s. Heading south from the Inman Yard, running past Washington Park, passing beneath I-20, turning southeast through the West End warehouse district, under Lee Street SW/U.S. Highway 29, and connecting to the Atlanta & West Point Belt Line Railroad, this line spans the Southwest and Westside Trails.

Perhaps the earliest official reference to an Atlanta "belt line" is an 1888 map of Atlanta produced by the United States Geological Survey which labels a railway segment (likely belonging to the Atlanta and Richmond Air-Line Railway) as the "Belt Line R.R." Still under heavy use today, this railway segment begins near the Westside Provisions area, connects to Amtrak's Peachtree station, and continues northeast paralleling I-85 past Ansley Golf Club. The map notes that this segment meets the Atlanta and Richmond Air-Line Railway line at a point labeled as "Belt Junction".\

Though not considered a "belt line" railroad, the Beltline also uses right-of-way from the former Atlantic Coast Line Railroad for the Westside Connector Trail and the northernmost portion of Segment 4 of the Westside Trail.

The horror movie HIDE & SEEK 3 will also be filmed on the Atlanta Beltline. The Atlanta Beltline is said to be a huge part of the movie's plot.

=== Concept for transformation ===
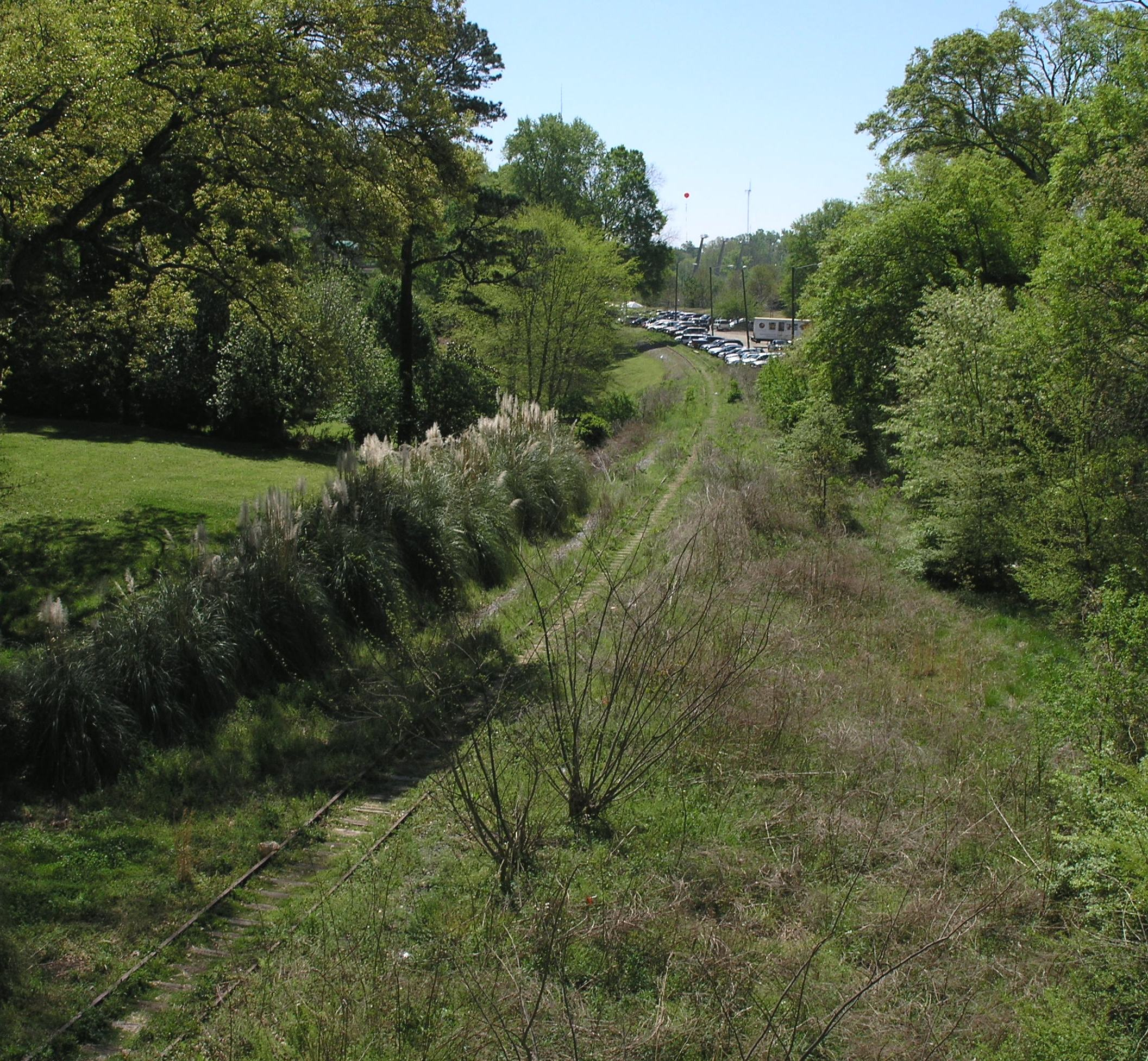
An as-yet undeveloped stretch of the Beltline behind Piedmont Park in 2006

The idea to turn the rail corridors into a ring of trails and parks originated in a 1991 proposal by the Georgia Rails-to-Trails Conservancy. In 1993, a similar plan was promoted by city planner Alycen Whiddon and adopted Atlanta City Council as part of the city's 15-year Parks, Open Space and Greenway Trails.

In his 1999 master's degree thesis, Georgia Tech dual architectural & city planning student Ryan Gravel proposed utilizing the corridors for transit to promote development. In 2000, while working for an Atlanta architectural firm, Gravel and two of his colleagues, Mark Arnold and Sarah Edgens, summarized his thesis added in the earlier trails and parks concept, and mailed copies to two dozen influential Atlantans. Cathy Woolard, then a City Council member, was an early supporter. She, Gravel, Arnold, and Edgens spent the next several months promoting the idea of the Beltline to neighborhood groups, and Atlanta business and civic leaders. To advocate for the project, they formed the non-profit Friends of the Belt Line.

Eventually, Woolard, by then City Council president, convinced Atlanta mayor Shirley Franklin to support the idea. But a series of studies of the idea, notable the Trust for Public Lands' "Beltline Emerald Necklace" report, concluded that trails, greenways, affordable housing and zoning changes should be tackled before Gravel's proposed rail line. Ultimately, in 2005, Atlanta City Council adopted "Beltline Redevelopment Plan," which was prepared by the Atlanta Development Authority, reflected these priorities.

The railroad tracks and rights-of-way were owned mostly by CSX Transportation, Norfolk Southern, and the Georgia Department of Transportation. Developer Wayne Mason had purchased most of the NS portion, in anticipation of the Beltline, but later sold it after conflict with the city.

The total length will be 22 miles (35 km), running about 3 miles (4.8 km) on either side of Atlanta's elongated central business district. It is planned to include a neighborhood-serving transit system (likely streetcars), footpaths, and the redevelopment of some 2,544 acres (1,030 ha). The project (although not the funding for it) is included in the 25-year Mobility 2030 plan of the Atlanta Regional Commission for improving transit. As of 2014, the project's planners estimated they had 17 years left before the project would be completed, and no light-rail lines had yet been built.

=== Construction ===
In 2005 the Atlanta Beltline Partnership was formed and in 2006 Atlanta Beltline, Inc. was formed and work began to develop the project.

In January 2009, GDOT and Amtrak filed a last-minute request for the Surface Transportation Board to block the transfer of northeast part of the Beltline from Norfolk Southern to the city government, instead reserving it for future intercity rail. However, this conflict was later resolved.

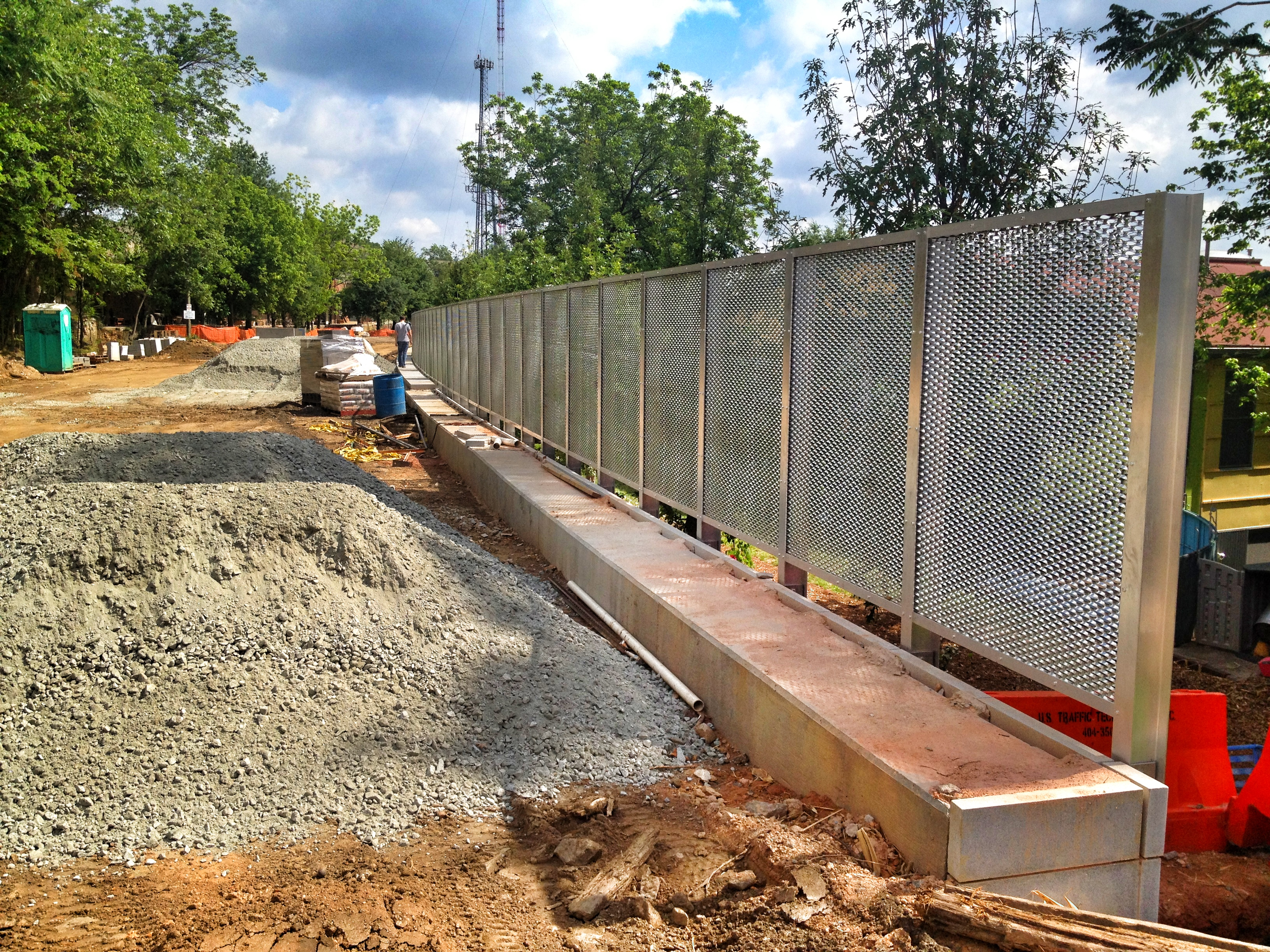
Beltline Eastside Trail under construction in the Old Fourth Ward, May 2012

In September 2019 the James M. Cox Foundation gave $6 million to the PATH Foundation which will connect the Silver Comet Trail to the Atlanta Beltline which is expected to be completed by 2022.

In May 2022, the James M. Cox foundation announced a $30 million pledge to the PATH Foundation in support of the Northwest Beltline trails project. This donation combined with previous gifts ensured that the funding is now in place to complete the full 22-mile (35 km) trail corridor by 2030.

== Route and trails ==
The Beltline will feature a continuous path encircling the central part of the city, generally following the old railroad right of way, but departing from it in several areas along the northwest portion of the route. In total, 33 miles (53 km) of multi-use paths are to be built, including spur trails connecting to neighborhoods. The Beltline connects 45 diverse neighborhoods, some of which are Atlanta's most underserved parks. The PATH Foundation, which has many years of experience building such trails in the Atlanta area, is a partner in the development of this portion of the system.

As of June 2026, there are 16.7 miles (26.9 km) of continuous completed mainline trail, forming a massive "U" shape that physically links the Northwest, Westside, Southside, Eastside, and Northeast corridors across 36 neighborhoods, along with several miles of connector trails.

=== Eastside Trail ===
The Eastside Trail stretches from Piedmont Park in the north to Inman Park and Old Fourth Ward in the south, passing by the greatest concentration of industrial architecture in Atlanta adapted for residential reuse and as offices, retail, dining and shopping, the most notable examples being Ponce City Market and Krog Street Market.

=== Westside/West End Trail ===
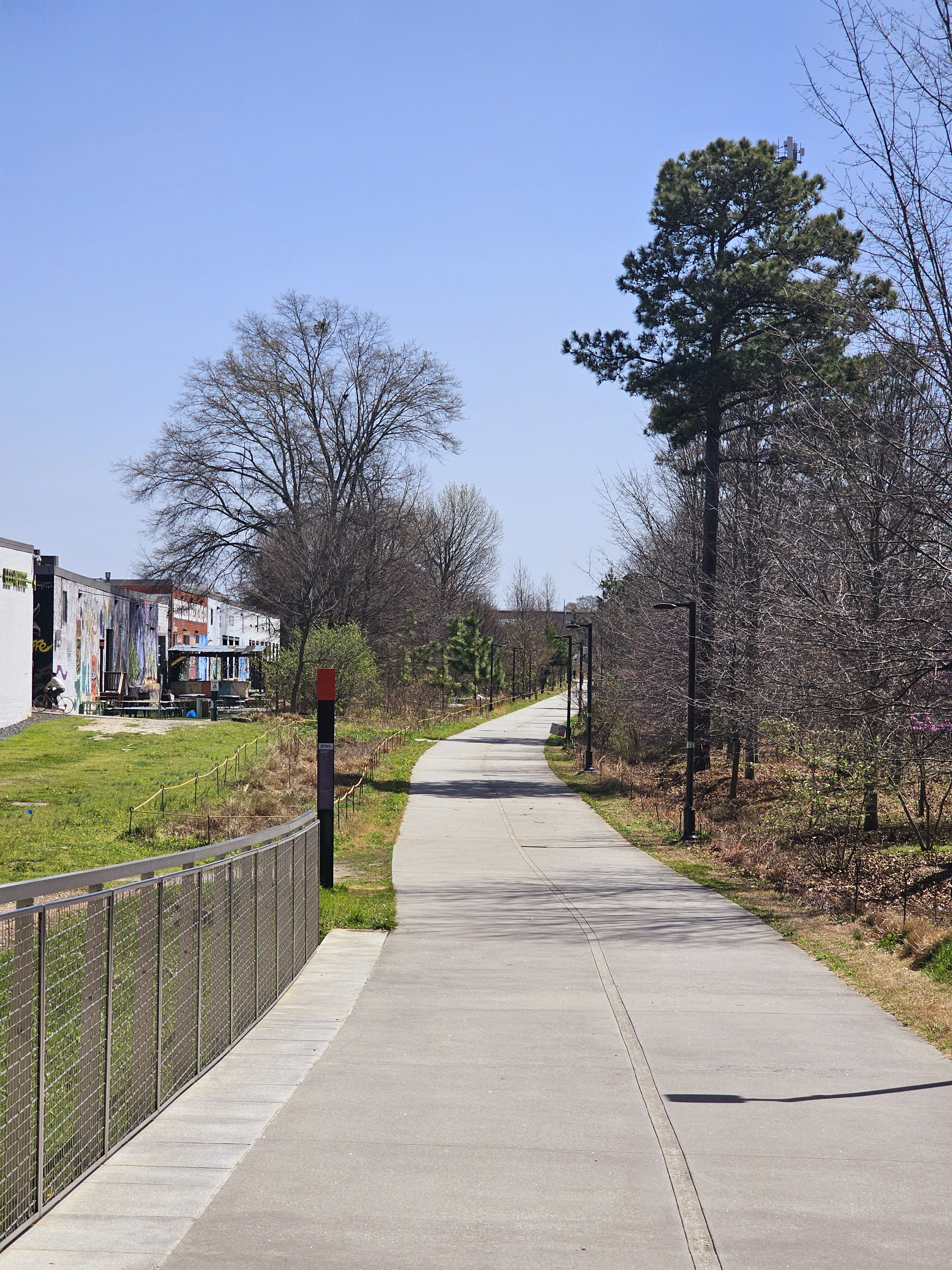
West End Trail in 2025

The first trail to be built on the Beltline, the 2.4-mile (3.9 km) West End Trail, was opened in 2008. It edges the neighborhood of the same name as well as serving Mozley Park and Westview. The trail stretches from White Street to Westview Cemetery and is built next to city streets. In 2013, the project received a federal grant of $18 million to develop the Westside Trail. The Westside Trail, opened in September 2017, is 3.2 miles (5.1 km) in length and is in the old railroad corridor. The Westside Trail stretches from West Marietta Street and ends at I-20. Along parts of the Westside Trail, the West End trail runs parallel and just outside of the old rail corridor.

=== Southside Trail ===
The Southside Trail extends 2.4 miles (3.9 km). In June 2026, Segments 2 and 3 officially opened to the public, completing a critical 1.9-mile paved link from McDaniel Street near Pittsburgh Yards to Boulevard Southeast. This segment successfully united the Eastside and Westside trail networks into an uninterrupted loop across southern Atlanta.

=== Southeast Trail ===
The Southeast Trail extends 2.5 miles (4.0 km) and connects the Eastside and Southside Trails. A portion links to the Eastside Trail near Krog Street Tunnel and continues southeast through Reynoldstown. The final segment runs from there to Boulevard Southeast.

=== Southwest Connector Trail ===
The Southwest Connector Spur Trail stretches through woods, starting at the Lionel Hampton Trail, ending at Westwood Avenue serving the Beecher Hills and Westwood Terrace neighborhoods. The existing 1.15-mile (1.85 km) trail is set to be part of an eventual 4.5-mile (7.2 km) trail.

=== Northside Trail ===
The first section of the Northside Trail opened in 2010 and forms part of a larger network of trails at the south end of Buckhead, the northern third of the city, in and around Tanyard Creek Park in the Collier Hills area. An additional stretch, the Northside Spur Trail was opened 2015.

The trail will eventually connect to the Peachtree Creek Greenway and the PATH400 once complete.

=== Discontinuities ===
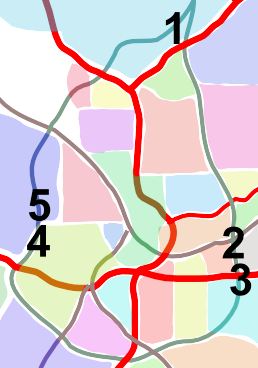
Map showing Beltline and connected neighborhoods

There are five historical major gaps along the Beltline where rights of way did not connect, as marked on the accompanying map (File:Beltline-breaks.png). As of 2026, construction developments have successfully bridged the Westside gaps (points 4 and 5), leaving three primary disruptions remaining to be resolved:

1. Armour Yard — Near the Lindbergh Center MARTA station, bisected by two active rail lines. Solving this would involve transit sharing the rail right-of-way and splitting off the trail where Clear Creek joins Peachtree Creek, following Clear Creek around the Armour warehouse properties then tunneling under the active rail lines and I-85 to the Ansley Golf Course then rejoining the Beltline.
2. CSX Hulsey Yard — Near the Inman Park/Reynoldstown MARTA station. A workaround for the trail is to use the existing tunnel at Krog Street.
3. Bill Kennedy Way (also known variously as the Glenwood-Memorial Connector and the Glenwood-Wylie Connector)— a bridge spanning I-20 between Glenwood Park/Ormewood Park and Reynoldstown. The proposed fix here is to widen the bridge enough to support trail, transit and motor traffic.
4. (Resolved) Washington Park to Joseph E. Boone Boulevard (formerly Simpson Rd) — Completed and integrated into the continuous Westside trail corridor.
5. (Resolved) Bankhead — Resolved via railroad right-of-way acquisitions and safe street multi-use trail connections.

=== The Comet Trail Connection ===
In September 2019, the James M. Cox Foundation gave $6 Million to the PATH Foundation to fund a connection between the Silver Comet Trail and the Beltline. The initial segments of the Westside BeltLine Connector have opened to the public, providing significant mixed-use path infrastructure leading out of downtown Atlanta. Upon full completion of the remaining regional segments, the total combined interconnected trail distance around Atlanta for PATH Foundation trails, the Atlanta Beltline, and the Silver Comet Trail will feature one of the longest continuous paved trail networks in the U.S., totaling about 300 miles (480 km).

== Parks ==
In 2004, The Trust for Public Land commissioned Alexander Garvin to produce a report, The Beltline Emerald Necklace: Atlanta's New Public Realm. This report showed the public a vision of transformation for the Beltline. The Beltline plan calls for the creation of a series of parks throughout the city creating what the working plan, The Beltline Emerald Necklace, calls the 13 "Beltline Jewels"; they would be connected by the trail and transit components of the plan. In total, the Beltline will create or rejuvenate 1,300 acres (530 ha) of green space. Here is a list of some parks that are a part of the Beltline:

=== Eastside Trail ===
- Historic Fourth Ward Park – 63 acres (25 ha) located near Ponce City Market and Thomas Taylor Memorial Skatepark
- Holtzclaw Park – 2 acres (0.81 ha)

=== Southside Trail ===
- Arthur Langford Jr. Park - nearly 10 acres (4.0 ha) named after the former Atlanta councilor
- Hillside Park – 28 acres (11 ha) at the current McDaniel CEO facility
- Boulevard Crossing Park - 5 acres (2.0 ha)
- D.H. Stanton Park - 8 acres (3.2 ha) located near Peoplestown and is Atlanta's first energy-cost-neutral park

=== Southwest Trail ===
- Perkerson Park - 50 acres (20 ha) is also a part of the Southside trail
- Rose Circle Park - in the Historic West End neighborhood

=== Westside Trail ===
- Enota Park – 8 acres (3.2 ha)
- Gordon White Park - 2 acres (0.81 ha)
- Maddox Park – 51 acres (21 ha)
- Shirley Clarke Franklin Park – a 351 acres (142 ha) park located on the site of the former Bellwood Quarry. The 100-foot-deep (30 m) former gravel pit will become a reservoir.
- Waterworks Park – 204 acres (83 ha)

=== Northside Trail ===
- Ardmore Park – 114 acres (46 ha)
- Peachtree Creek Park – 65 acres (26 ha) at Peachtree Creek near Buckhead

The Trust for Public Land, a national non-profit, partnered with the Atlanta Beltline project and acquired 33 properties, totaling 1,300 acres (530 ha). These properties will increase Atlanta's green space by nearly 40%.

== MARTA connections ==
The Beltline connects to the Rapid A-Line, MARTA's first bus rapid transit (BRT) line. The 5-mile (8.0 km) line runs from downtown Atlanta, through Summerhill, and ends at the Beltline. The line will utilize new 60-foot articulated electric buses.

In July 2023, the federal government provided a $25 million grant to construct 2.2 miles (3.5 km) of Beltline trails between Lindbergh Center station and Armour Yard. This northeast trail expansion would connect a MARTA rail station to the Beltline for the first time.

There are plans to build infill stations at four points along the Beltline with Krog Street/Hulsey Yards on the Eastside Trail, Joseph E. Boone Boulevard on the Westside Trail, Murphy Crossing on the Southside Trail, and Armour Yard on the Northside Trail.

== Transit ==
The 22-mile (35 km) light rail streetcar component of the Beltline plan was originally developed in 1999 as the central focus of a master's thesis by Georgia Tech student Ryan Gravel. The vision has expanded to include trails, parks and greenspace, streetscapes, public art, affordable housing, economic development, environmental sustainability, and historic preservation. In summer 2012, there was a referendum on whether a 1-cent sales tax (SPLOST) should be implemented to fund traffic and road improvements. If approved, the tax would have funded several streetcar routes along portions of the Beltline trail and connections to MARTA stations and the Downtown Loop streetcar. The sales tax did not pass.

In 2016, City of Atlanta voters passed the More MARTA sales tax, providing $1.3 billion for the expansion of transit. In 2019, MARTA's Board of Directors adopted the program implementation plan for More MARTA funds, including the expansion of the existing Atlanta Streetcar tracks to the Atlanta Beltline corridor via the Streetcar East Extension) and the Streetcar West Extension. Also included in the funding are Beltline Northeast LRT, Beltline Southwest LRT, and Beltline Southeast LRT. In March 2025, Atlanta mayor Andre Dickens reversed his position and withdrew support from starting the Beltline rail at the popular Eastside Trail, in the lead-up to his re-election campaign.

== Art ==
Atlanta Beltline Art is the city of Atlanta's largest temporary public art exhibition that showcases the work of hundreds of visual artists, performers, and musicians along nine miles (14 km) of the Beltline corridor. The first exhibition was in 2010. There also is a considerable amount of spontaneous unofficial street art to be found throughout the Beltline ranging from murals to sculptures.

Examples of Beltline Art

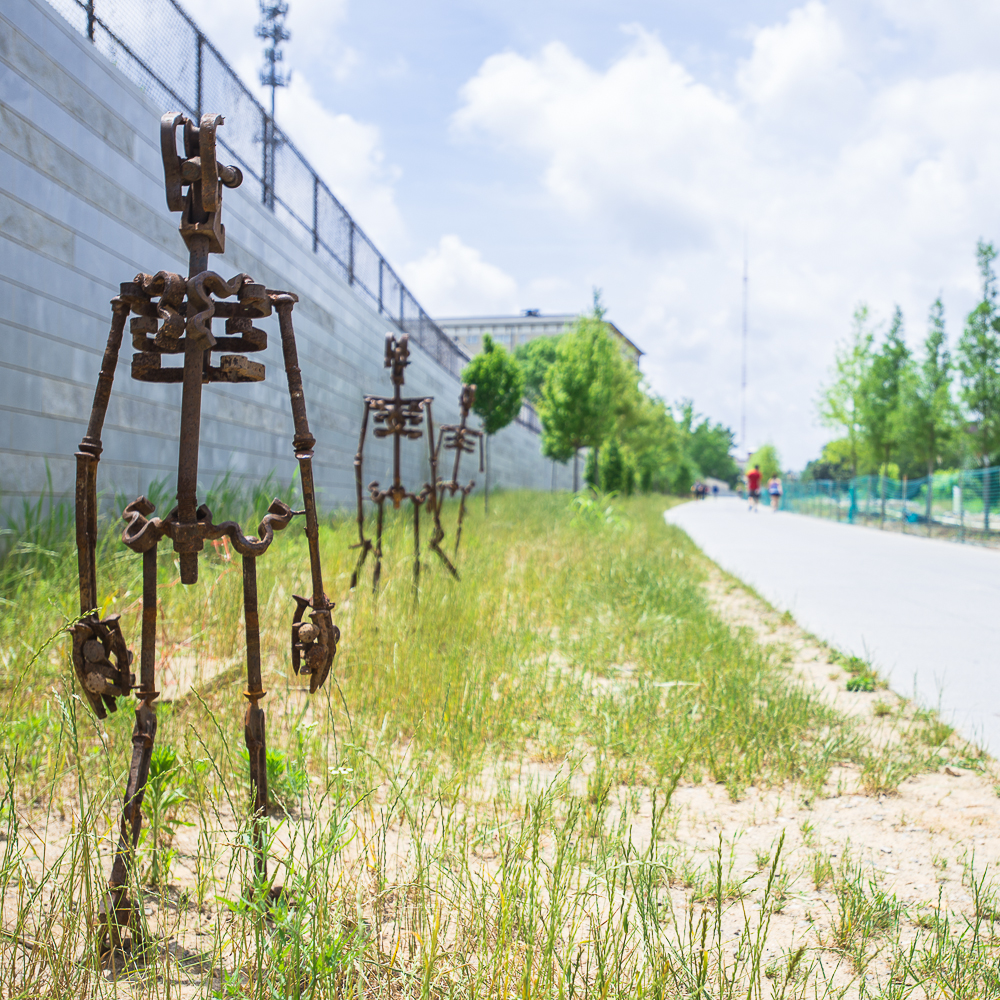
"Railroad Workers" by Jac Coffey

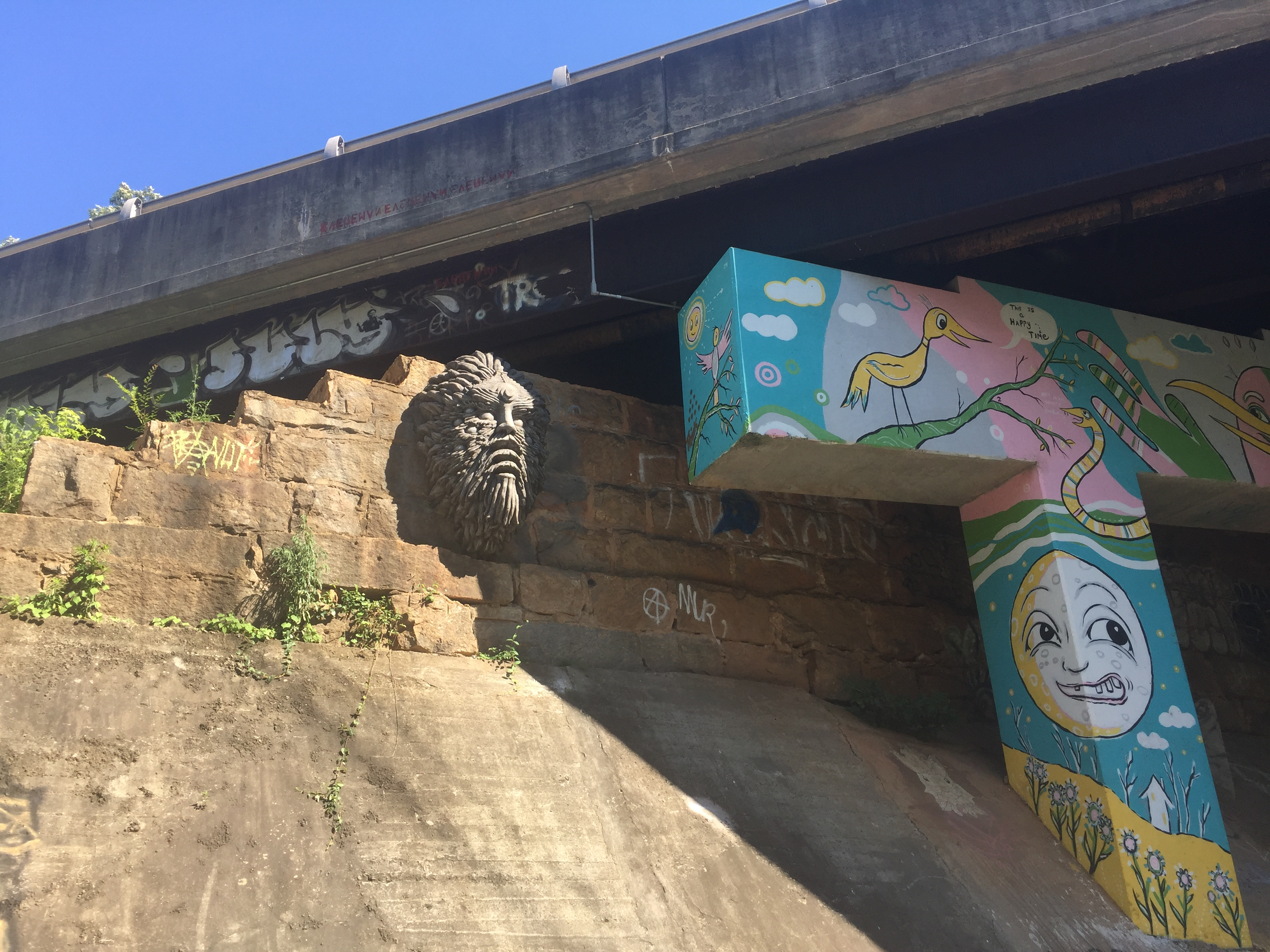
Sculpture under the Freedom Parkway bridge near Inman Park

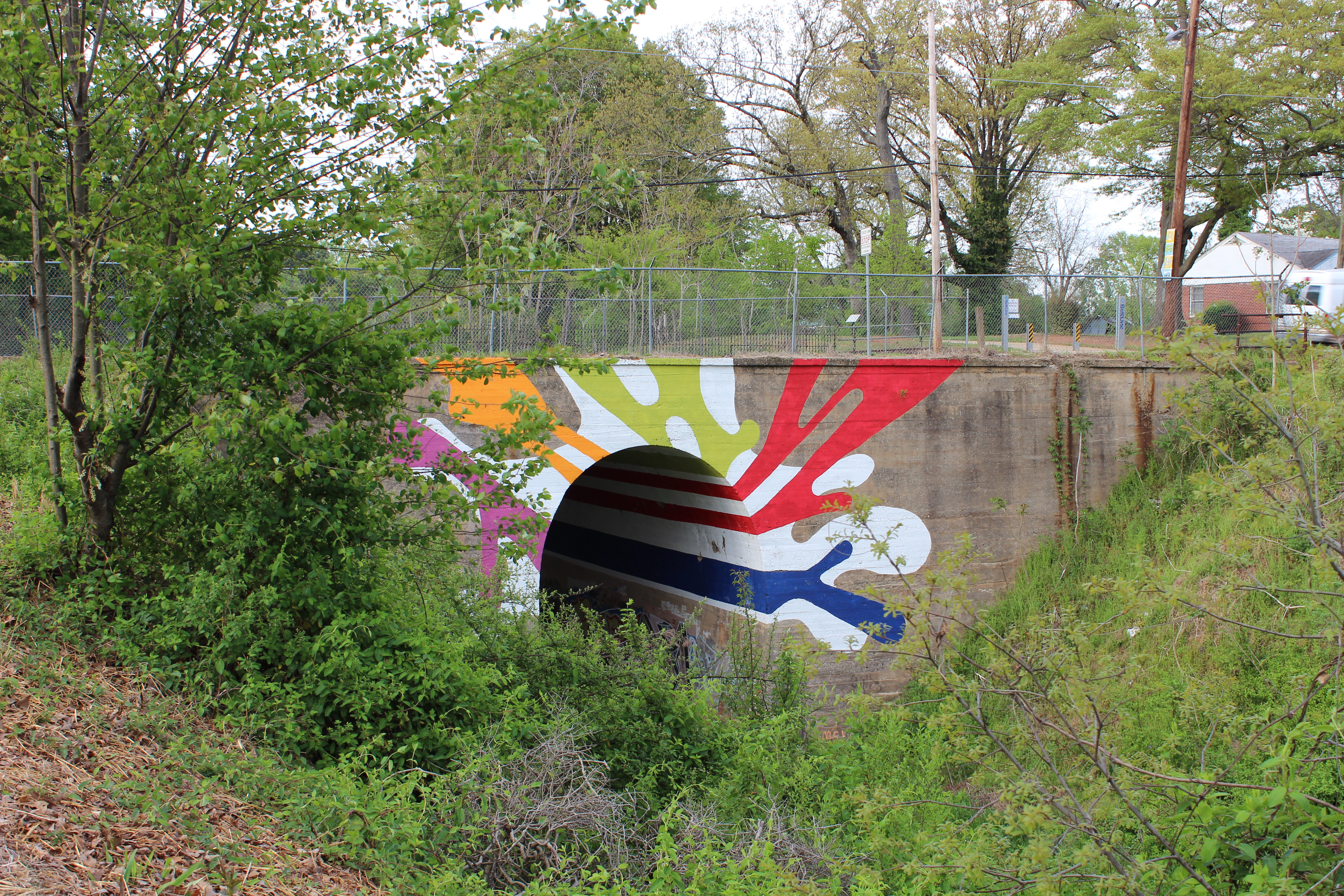
"The Highball Artist" by Hadley Breckenridge on the Lucile Avenue Bridge

== Industrial architecture ==
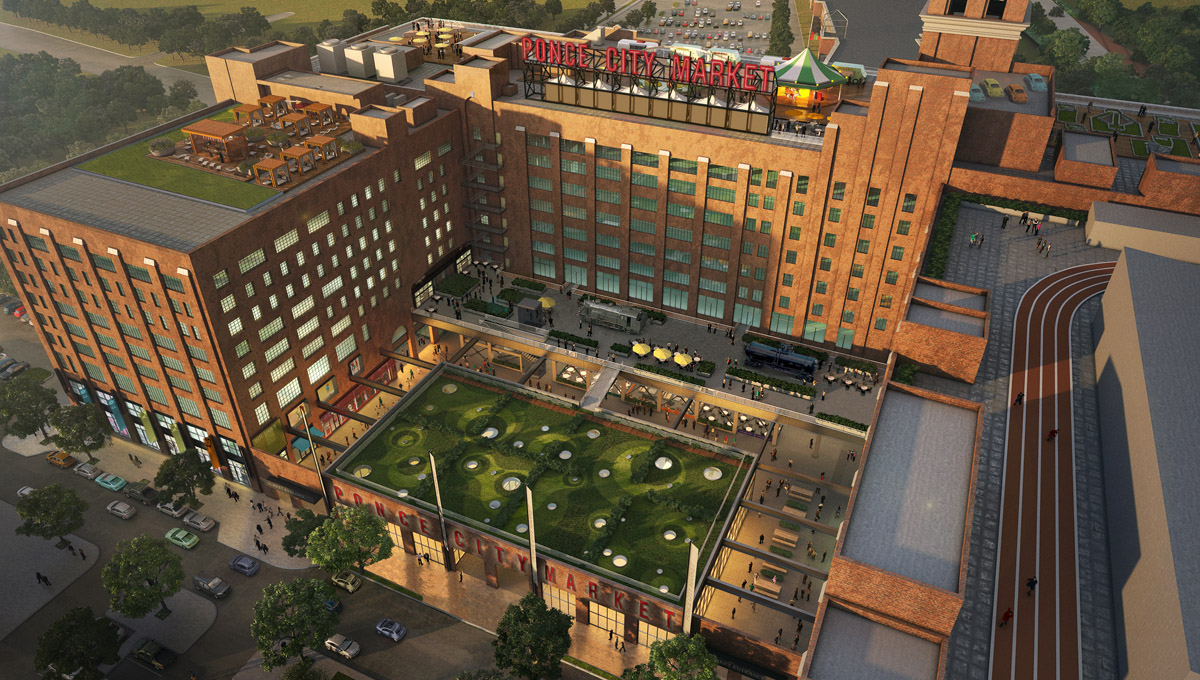
Ponce City Market is a multi-use complex, formerly the Sears, Roebuck warehouse for the southeastern U.S.

Many former industrial buildings alongside the Beltline, particularly the Eastside Trail, have been repurposed for residential and retail use, such as Amsterdam Walk, Ponce City Market, Ford Factory Lofts, the Krog Street Market, the Telephone Factory Lofts, and the DuPre Excelsior Mill and the Pencil Factory and N. Highland Steel in Inman Park Village.

== Impact ==
Due to the massive surge in interest in Beltline adjacent properties and subsequently increased pricing of such properties, many property developers have purchased land in previously low-income neighborhoods and transformed them into luxury living. For homes within a 0.5-mile (0.80 km) radius of the Beltline, home values increased between 17.9 and 26.6% between 2011 and 2015. In 2016, project founder Ryan Gravel resigned from the Beltline Partnership board of directors over concerns regarding equitable growth and affordable housing safeguards. In 2017, Beltline CEO Paul Morris also stepped down following mounting criticism over the project's slow pace in delivering affordable housing units. Since these early leadership departures, protests and community demonstrations have periodically continued to challenge the gentrification and infrastructural displacement surrounding the expanding loop.

Under subsequent leadership, including President and CEO Clyde Higgs (appointed in 2019), Atlanta Beltline, Inc. shifted its strategy to prioritize community stabilization, land banking, and data transparency. To curb displacement, the agency established anti-displacement initiatives such as the Legacy Resident Retention Program to offset rising property tax burdens for longtime homeowners through 2030. By mid-2026, the project had achieved 79% of its state-mandated goal to create or preserve 5,600 affordable housing units by 2030, delivering 4,425 units inside its Tax Allocation District (TAD). To improve transparency, the agency launched a public digital Affordable Housing Dashboard and mobile tracking app in January 2026. Additionally, the agency has acquired 94 acres of land across the corridor to safeguard future public-private spaces for non-market-rate housing and affordable commercial spaces targeting local small businesses.

Proponents highlight the project as a leading national model for urban revitalization and economic expansion. By 2026, the Beltline had catalyzed $14.2 billion in cumulative private investment since its inception, surpassing its original long-term $10 billion economic development target years ahead of schedule. Economic studies indicate that Beltline-related development, operational business density, and visitor spending generate roughly $23 billion in annual economic output for the City of Atlanta. On job creation, the corridor has generated more than 34,000 cumulative permanent jobs (achieving 69% of its ultimate 50,000 permanent job goal) and over 60,500 construction jobs, effectively exceeding its initial construction hiring targets by 126%. Along with returning economic density to the urban core, the project continues to target its baseline goals of adding 1,300 acres of new greenspace and 22 miles of transit infrastructure.
