= Cascade, Atlanta =

Cascade in Atlanta may refer to:

- Southwest Atlanta
- Cascade Heights, a neighborhood in Southwest Atlanta
