= Transracial =

Transracial may refer to:

- Transracial adoption, placing a child of one racial or ethnic group with adoptive parents of another racial or ethnic group
- Transracial (identity), having a racial identity or racial expression that differs from one's race of birth
- Racial transformation, the process by which a region changes in racial composition

== See also ==
- Passing (racial identity), a person classified as a member of one racial group is also accepted as a member of a different racial group
- Racial misrepresentation, when someone misrepresents their ethnic or racial background
- Minnesota Transracial Adoption Study, a study on whether non-white children adopted by white families gained an IQ advantage.
- Multiracial, people with an identifiable heritage from more than a single racial group
- Ethnic plastic surgery, changing an individual's appearance to look more or less like a particular race or ethnicity
- Hypatia transracialism controversy, an academic debate triggered by a comparison of Caitlyn Jenner to Rachel Dolezal which suggested a rejection of biology is akin to rejecting a socially constructed racial identity
- List of interracial topics
