= Atlanta's Berlin Wall =

1962 event during the civil rights movement in Georgia, U.S.

- Part of the Civil Rights Movement
- An image of the barricade
- Date: December 17, 1962 – March 1, 1963
- Location: Cascade Heights, Atlanta, Georgia, United States
- Caused by: Fear of racial integration by white homeowners in Cascade Heights
- Result: Barricades ruled unconstitutional by a Federal judge, removed shortly thereafter; Racial transformation of Cascade Heights; Increase in white flight from Atlanta

Atlanta's Berlin Wall, also known as the Peyton Road Affair or the Peyton Wall, refers to an event during the civil rights movement in Atlanta, Georgia, United States, in 1962. On December 17 of that year, the government of Atlanta, led by mayor Ivan Allen Jr., erected a barricade in the Cascade Heights neighborhood, mostly along Peyton Road, for the purposes of dissuading African Americans from moving into the neighborhood. The act was criticized by many African American leaders and civil rights groups in the city, and on March 1 of the following year the barricade was ruled unconstitutional and removed. The incident is seen as one of the most public examples of white Americans' fears of racial integration in Atlanta.

== Background ==
Cascade Heights is an affluent neighborhood of Atlanta located in the southwestern part of the city. During the early 1960s, the neighborhood and surrounding area began to undergo a racial transformation as many African Americans began to move into the area. In December 1962, Clinton Warner, a D-Day veteran, civil rights activist, and founding member of the Morehouse School of Medicine, purchased a home in Peyton Forest, a white subdivision in Cascade Heights. The contractor who had sold the house was under financial difficulties at the time and had been unable to find a white buyer for the house. Shortly thereafter, the neighborhood began to experience blockbusting, wherein several of the white homeowners, fearful that more African Americans would move into their neighborhood, began to sell their properties to real estate agents who then sold the property to African Americans at a higher price.

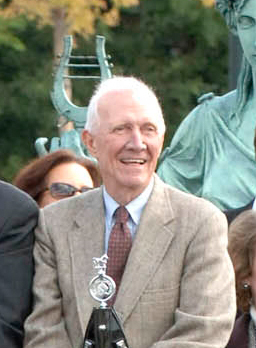
Alderman Rodney Mims Cook Sr., who publicly opposed the wall

Following this, white homeowners in the neighborhood asked Atlanta mayor Ivan Allen Jr. to erect a barricade along Peyton Road and Harlan Road to deter more African Americans from moving into the area. The Atlanta Board of Aldermen approved their request on December 17 and Allen signed it into law later that day, with work on the barricade starting the next day. Rodney Mims Cook Sr. was one of the few aldermen to vote against the barricade. (Note: In a later vote over the wall, ten of the 13 aldermen on the board voted in favor of the wall.) Cook gave an impassioned speech at the Georgia State Capitol against the wall, which, according to his son, led to the Ku Klux Klan burning a cross in his front yard. Following the erection of the barricade, Cook, who was also a member of the Georgia House of Representatives, would introduce a resolution to remove the wall. The barricade was seen as part of a larger effort by Allen to prevent "encroachment and penetration" into white neighborhoods of southwest Atlanta, and months earlier, Allen had vetoed a proposal to establish an African American cemetery near Westview Cemetery in the area. Along with the barricade, Allen intended to rezone about 800 acres (320 ha) of commercial land north of Peyton Forest to serve as a residential area for African Americans. This land, which was mostly unused, was previously being used as a "racial barrier". (Note: Zoning was often used as a form of enforcing racial segregation in Atlanta, with a common technique being to zone an area as "commercial" in order to stop the growth of African-American neighborhoods.)

== The barricade ==
The "wall" was a short barricade, about 3 feet (0.91 m) tall, made of wood and steel. Almost immediately after the barricade was erected, the African American community in Atlanta began to voice their disapproval of the structure. Some newspapers in the city called it "Atlanta's Wall," and black Atlantans referred to it as "Atlanta's Berlin Wall". The reference to Berlin was especially poignant to Allen, who had said in his inaugural address, “It was in Berlin that the tragic and dramatic lesson of what happens to a divided city came home to me.” Protesters continued to evoke the image of postwar Europe with protest sayings such as, "We want no Warsaw Ghetto – open Peyton Road." According to historian Paul M. Farber, these efforts sought to link racial segregation in the United States to "Cold War division" and "Holocaust trauma."

African Americans led a boycott in West End, Atlanta, avoiding businesses in the area that supported the barricade, and picketing occurred at Atlanta City Hall. The Committee on Appeal for Human Rights (COAHR), the Student Nonviolent Coordinating Committee (SNCC), and Atlanta's Committee for Cooperative Action (ACCA) formed a committee to coordinate efforts to protest the barricade. A statement signed by Martin Luther King Sr. and the president of the Atlanta chapter of the NAACP, among others, called the barricade "one of Atlanta's gravest mistakes and a slap at our national creed of democracy and justice." In a December 22 letter sent by the COAHR to Allen, they describe the opposition to the wall by Atlanta University students and pledge to continue to picket the West End neighborhood and stage largescale demonstrations at the wall. In a telegram sent the next day, Allen stated that he had assembled a committee to look into the situation regarding the wall. Following this, SNCC chair James Forman staged a publicity stunt where he met with a white resident of Cascade Heights at the barricade, with the image of the two meeting published in a January 1963 issue of Jet. Many other publications and journalists from across the United States covered the incident as well, with Time discussing the event in an article called "Divided City."

On January 7, 1963, Atlanta's board of aldermen voted in favor of keeping the barricade in place, and following this the attorney representing those opposed to the barricade appealed his case to the Fulton County Superior Court. On March 1, 1963, a judge ruled the barrier unconstitutional, calling the decision to erect the barricade "unreasonable, arbitrary, and capricious". Within minutes of the decision Allen ordered the barricade to be removed. According to Allen, the day the judge was set to render his decision, he had a crew set up near the barricade, and after hearing the decision, they had it completely removed within 20 minutes. The barrier had remained in place for 72 days.

== Aftermath ==
Following the removal of the barricades, the neighborhood and surrounding area continued to undergo a racial transformation, amplified by white flight from the area and Atlanta as a whole. Many middle class African American families moved into the area, and by July 1963, only 15 white families remained in the neighborhood. The incident also drew national attention to race relations in the city, with a 2015 article in Curbed Atlanta stating that the event "became a national poster child of 1960s white-flight". During the 1960s and 1970s, approximately 160,000 white Americans moved from Atlanta, with many moving to nearby areas outside of city limits, and today, Cascade Heights is home to many "black elites" in Atlanta. The incident also change the city government's approach to segregation through urban planning, with one history book claiming that, following the incident, "Atlanta's planners and policymakers simply pulled back the lines of resistance in select neighborhoods and took their stand along a broader perimeter that separated whites from blacks."

Criticism of the incident surprised Allen, who had believed that the barricade would put more focus on unused land north of Cascade Heights. Discussing the event years later in his autobiography, Allen claimed he was "completely in error in trying to solve the issue in such a crude way" and stated that he had not sought out sufficient advice prior to his decision. According to a biography on Allen, the incident was "the last time a roadblock was used for segregation" in the city. Several sources view the incident as a misstep by Allen, who has an otherwise strong legacy with regards to promoting civil rights.

== See also ==
- Racial segregation in Atlanta

== Bibliography ==
- "The Reimagining of Cascade Heights". AIA Georgia. July 31, 2017. Archived from the original on November 12, 2020.
- "19 things you didn't know about Atlanta's past". Atlanta. February 13, 2017. Archived from the original on August 12, 2020.
- Brown-Nagin, Tomiko (2011). Courage to Dissent: Atlanta and the Long History of the Civil Rights Movement. Oxford University Press. ISBN 978-0-19-983159-3 – via Google Books.
- Clemmons, Jeff (2018). Atlanta's Historic Westview Cemetery. The History Press. ISBN 978-1-62619-967-5 – via Google Books.
- Crater, Paul (December 1, 2011). "Atlanta's "Berlin Wall"". Atlanta. Archived from the original on November 1, 2020.
- Cristal, Aiyana (February 14, 2017). "Atlanta's "Berlin Wall" built to keep black residents out of all-white community". WGCL-TV. Meredith Corporation. Archived from the original on November 12, 2020.
- Farber, Paul M. (2020). A Wall of Our Own: An American History of the Berlin Wall. University of North Carolina Press. ISBN 978-1-4696-5509-3 – via Google Books.
- Galloway, Tammy H. (August 23, 2004). "Ivan Allen Jr. (1911-2003)". New Georgia Encyclopedia. Archived from the original on October 17, 2020.
- Gentry, Jerry (1999). Grady Baby: A Year in the Life of Atlanta's Grady Hospital. University Press of Mississippi. ISBN 978-1-57806-157-0 – via Google Books.
- Green, Josh (September 23, 2015). "How the Cascade Heights 'Revolution' Transformed Atlanta". Curbed Atlanta. Vox Media. Archived from the original on October 27, 2020.
- Green, Josh (January 4, 2016). "Cascade Heights is Eyeing a Transformative Future". Curbed Atlanta. Vox Media. Archived from the original on September 20, 2019.
- Harmon, David Andrew (1996). Hodges, Graham (ed.). Beneath the Image of the Civil Rights Movement and Race Relations: Atlanta, Georgia, 1946-1981. Garland Publishing. ISBN 978-0-8153-2437-9 – via Google Books.
- Kruse, Kevin Michael (2005). White Flight: Atlanta and the Making of Modern Conservatism. Princeton University Press. ISBN 978-0-691-09260-7 – via Google Books.
- Lefever, Harry G. (2005). Undaunted by the Fight: Spelman College and the Civil Rights Movement, 1957/1967. Mercer University Press. ISBN 978-0-86554-976-0 – via Google Books.
- Quinn, Christopher (July 8, 2019). "'Atlanta Way' questioned in pitched debate to name civil rights park". The Atlanta Journal-Constitution. Cox Enterprises. Archived from the original on April 10, 2020.
- Riley, Betsy (February 3, 2014). "Neighborhood: Cascade". Atlanta. Archived from the original on October 27, 2020.
- Silver, Christopher; Moeser, John V. (1995). The Separate City: Black Communities in the Urban South, 1940-1968. University Press of Kentucky. ISBN 978-0-8131-6146-4 – via Google Books.
- Tuck, Stephen G. N. (2003). Beyond Atlanta: The Struggle for Racial Equality in Georgia, 1940-1980. University of Georgia Press. ISBN 978-0-8203-2528-6 – via Google Books.
