= List of interracial topics =

Interracial topics include:

- Interracial marriage, marriage between two people of different races
  - Interracial marriage in the United States
    - 2009 Louisiana interracial marriage incident
- Interracial adoption, placing a child of one racial group or ethnic group with adoptive parents of another racial or ethnic group
- Interracial personals, advertisements
- Interracial pornography, a form of visual pornography depicting sexual activity between performers of different racial groups
- Miscegenation, the mixing of different racial groups
  - Anti-miscegenation laws in the United States
- Commission on Interracial Cooperation, an organization in the southern United States in the early 20th century
- Multiracial, people with an identifiable heritage from more than a single racial group
- First interracial kiss on television

== See also ==
- Exogamy
- Transracial (disambiguation)
