= Hulsey Yard =

Rail yard in Georgia, United States

Coordinates: 33.7529°N 84.3623°W

Hulsey Yard is a rail yard of the CSX railroad, stretching approximately 0.9 miles (1.4 km) along the border of the Old Fourth Ward, Inman Park, Cabbagetown and Reynoldstown neighborhoods of Atlanta. The south wall of the rail yard along Wylie Street in Reynoldstown is one of the most prominent locations for street art in Atlanta. The art is managed by the Wallkeepers Committee of the Cabbagetown Neighborhood Improvement Association,

Hulsey Yard was originally part of the Georgia Railroad and Banking Company.

MARTA's Blue Line and Green Line traverses the rail yard.

The yard is a key node on the BeltLine trail, whose northeast section terminates across Decatur Street/DeKalb Avenue from the west end of the yard, and whose southeast section terminates at the east end of the yard, and poses as issue as to how to connect the two sections of the trail across the yard.

The BeltLine and other local organizations also use the designation Hulsey Yard name to designate a natural habitat on the subcontinental divide, and an associated "arboretum" or nature walk that it promotes in the area.
