= Enota Park =

Park in Atlanta, GA

Coordinates: 33.7428°N 84.4373°W

Enota Park is a 8 acres (3.2 ha) playlot in the Westview neighborhood of Atlanta, GA. Enota park is located near the Westview Cemetery and Interstate 20. The park is currently being redesigned to be incorporated into the Westside Trail portion of the Atlanta Beltline. Enota Park was identified as one of 4 parks to be expanded by Alexander Garvin and Associates in a 2004 study commission by The Trust for Public Land called The Beltline Emerald Necklace: Atlanta's New Public Realm.

== Park expansion ==
The Beltline Emerald Necklace envisioned expanding the current 0.3 acre Enota park to 10 acres. The Trust for Public Land has acquired 6 properties to add 3.8 acres. The fully realized 8 acre park will be bound by Interstate 20 to the north, the Westside Trail to the east, Lucile Avenue to the south, and Enota Place to the west.

== Park design ==
Enota Park is largely surrounded by dense woodland. The lack of development is attributed to the difficult topography of the land. The Enota Park master plan indicates keeping woodland due to its rarity in an urban setting.

Starting in early 2018, public meetings are being held to engage the public in surrounding neighborhoods to participate in design development.

$600,000 of federal funding will transform the existing park with a new playground, multipurpose field as well as an entrance to the Beltline for bicyclists and pedestrians.
