= Reynoldstown, Atlanta =

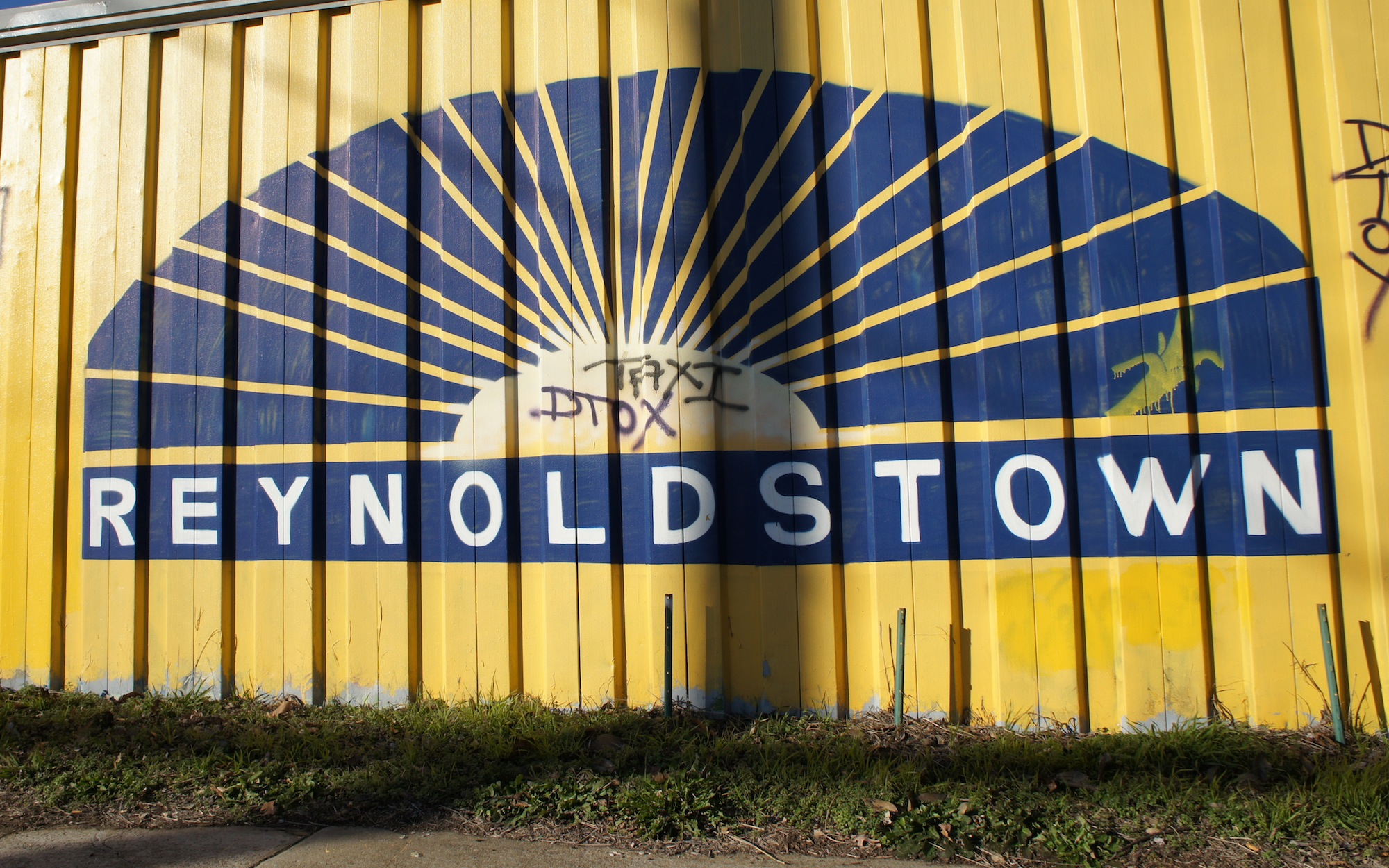
Reynoldstown logo on rail yard wall

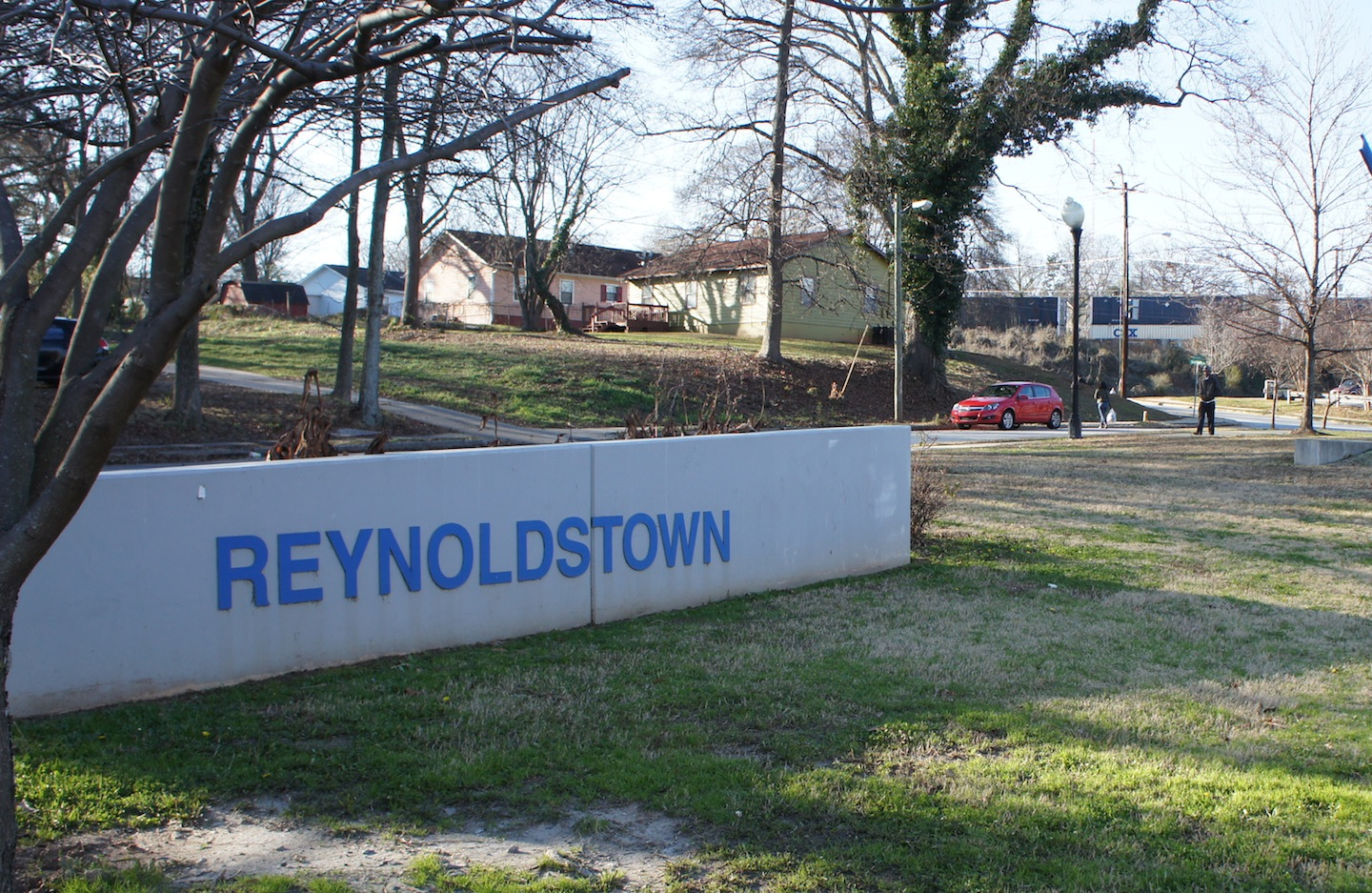
Gateway Park – sign and sculpture (design Brett J Harris)

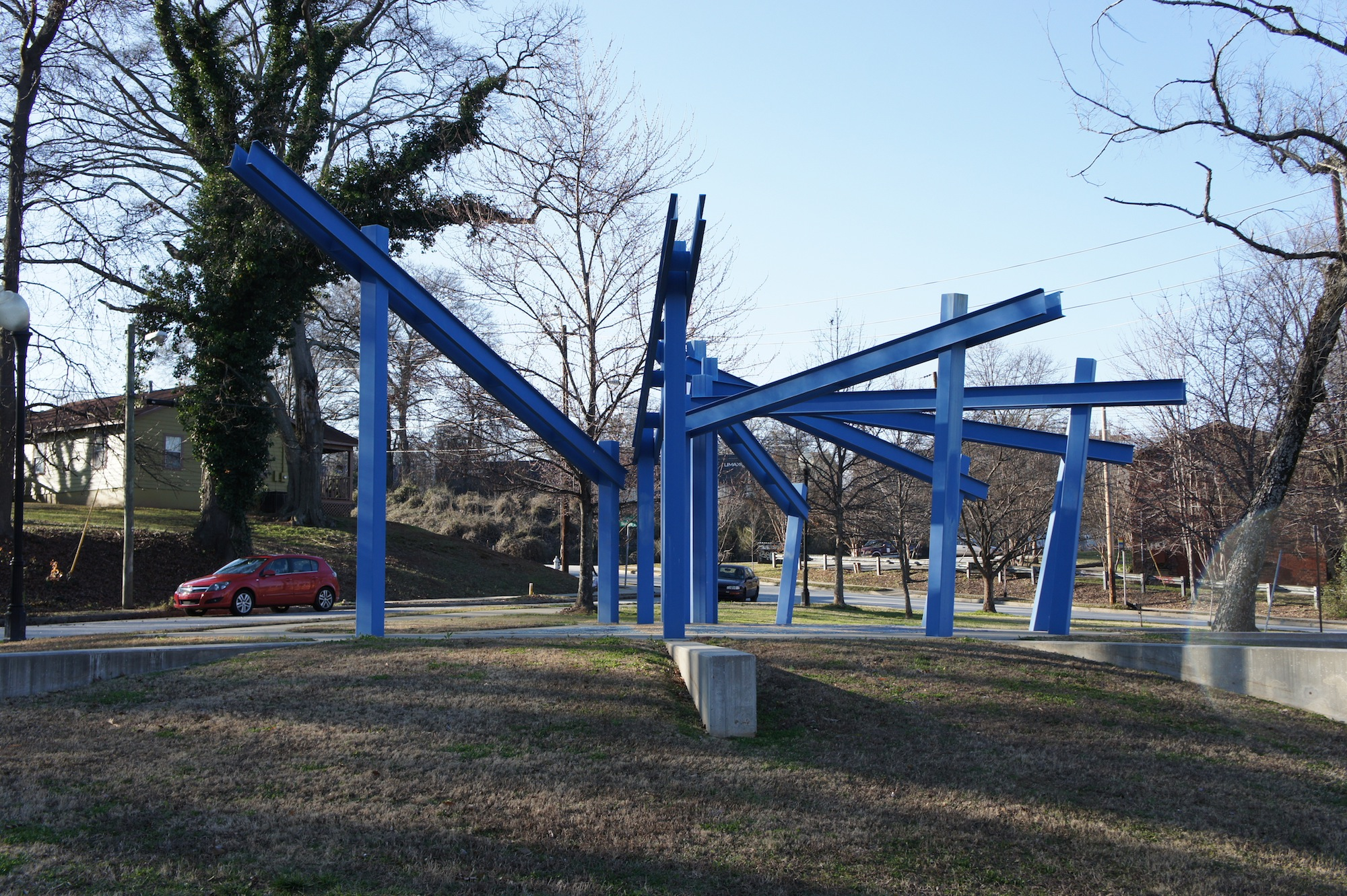
Gateway Park – sculpture (design Brett J Harris)

Reynoldstown is a historic district and intown neighborhood on the near east side of Atlanta, Georgia, located two miles from downtown.

== History and demographics ==
- Reynoldstown Historic District
- U.S. National Register of Historic Places
- U.S. Historic district
- Location within Atlanta Location within Georgia Location within the United States
- Location: Roughly bounded by the CSX rail line, Memorial Dr., Pearl St., and Moreland, Atlanta, Georgia
- Coordinates: 33°45′7″N 84°21′16″W
- Built: 1865
- Architect: Chase, William J.J.
- Architectural style: Romanesque, Colonial Revival, et al.
- NRHP reference No.: 02001405
- Added to NRHP: April 03, 2003

Reynoldstown is a community that was originally settled after the American Civil War by freed slaves who were employed by the railroad. Madison and Sarah Reynolds were among the first ex-slaves to move into the area, and it is believed that the neighborhood was named after them. Reynoldstown was annexed by the city of Atlanta in 1909 and celebrates its historic tie to freed slave roots and artistic expressions to empower residents with its annual Wheelbarrow Festival. The neighborhood continued to thrive and prosper until the 1950s when the railroad industry began to decline. Reynoldstown began revitalization and increasing in property values in the 1990s, gradually shifting demographics from majority Black to majority White. The neighborhood was listed as a Historic District on the National Register of Historic Places in 2003.

== Geography ==
Reynoldstown is bordered on the west by Pearl Street, across which is Cabbagetown and, south of Memorial Drive, Grant Park; on the east by Moreland Avenue and Edgewood; on the south by I-20, across which is the Ormewood Park neighborhood and an industrial area which is officially part of Grant Park; and on the north by the railroad line and Inman Park.

Reynoldstown lies in NPU N. It is listed on the National Register of Historic Places as a historic district. Local landmarks include the Colgate Mattress Factory, Habitat For Humanity headquarters, and the former Atlanta & West Point Railroad depot, which now houses a restaurant.

=== Parks and trails ===
The Beltline bisects Reynoldstown north-south. It functions as a paved walking and biking trail, and possibly for transit use (either light rail or streetcar). Just north of Reynoldstown in Inman Park adjacent the intersection of Krog St and Irwin St, The East Side Trail, part of The Beltline, is paved from here to Piedmont Park through Inman Park, Old Fourth Ward, Poncey-Highland and Virginia-Highland. The CSX railroad Hulsey Yard forms the northern border of the neighborhood, a current issue is how to connect the southeast Beltline to the Eastside Trail portion of the Beltline across the yard. The southern wall of the yard on Wylie Street in Reynoldstown and Cabbagetown is a prominent location for street art in Atlanta. Lang-Carson Park (3.24 acres (1.31 ha)) also lies within Reynoldstown.

== Transportation ==
Memorial Drive is the major thoroughfare passing through the south end of Reynoldstown, with mostly light industrial properties, many of which are now repurposed for residential, retail and entertainment use. Reynoldstown contains rail right-of-way that is planned for the Beltline. Reynoldstown is served by the Inman Park/Reynoldstown MARTA station.

== Reynoldstown Civic Improvement League ==
Reynoldstown Civic Improvement League's (RCIL) is the neighborhood association that represents Reynoldstown in NPU-N.

== See also ==
- Gentrification of Atlanta
