= Jenningstown =

Coordinates: 33°45′16″N 84°24′31″W

Jenningstown was a shantytown in Atlanta built on the top of, and around, what was then known as Diamond Hill in the First Ward. Atlanta University was built on the summit, opening in 1869. Its population shortly after the Civil War was 2,490, all black except for some white missionaries living there. It had rough roads and an inadequate water supply. Jenningstown is mentioned into the 20th century, though its boundaries were described as loosely defined; Beaver Slide was its southern border.
