= Mozley Park =

- Mozley Park Historic District
- U.S. National Register of Historic Places
- U.S. Historic district
- Location within Atlanta Location within Georgia Location within the United States
- Location: Roughly bounded by Westview Dr., West Lake Ave., Seaboard Coast Line RR tracks and M. L. King and Rockmart Dr., Atlanta, Georgia
- Coordinates: 33.750827°N 84.426455°W
- Area: 300 acres (120 ha)
- Architectural style: Late Victorian, Late 19th And Early 20th Century American Movements
- NRHP reference No.: 95000909
- Added to NRHP: August 11, 1995

Mozley Park is a typical early 20th-century residential neighborhood, located approximately three miles west of downtown Atlanta. The community is named after the original landowner, Dr. Hiram Mozley, whose heirs inherited the land after his death in 1902.

== Establishment ==
The houses in the district were built over a 20-year period, beginning around 1920 when the basic street arrangements were completely mapped. The houses built in the oldest section of the neighborhood are Folk Victorian cottages and Craftsman bungalows built on small lots with varied setbacks and no driveways. There have been modest changes to the houses, including new awnings, siding, and rear additions. The overall neighborhood plan is that of a gridiron, typical of many Atlanta neighborhoods. Many of the streets have retained their original granite curbing and narrow sidewalks with hexagonal pavers. Lots are primarily 50 feet (15 m) wide.

The district also includes the Mozley Park Recreational Area. In 1922, the citizens of Mozley Park and the surrounding area asked the Atlanta City Council to purchase the Mozley estate for a recreation area to serve residents of the southwest side of Atlanta. The Civil War breastworks and trenches that remained on the site were leveled. A park was developed with roadways, landscaped areas, lakes, a swimming pool, and a bathhouse. The only other non-residential building in the district is the Frank Lebby Stanton Elementary School, named for Georgia's first poet laureate. It was built on a wooded hill adjacent to Mozley Park. The school is a traditional two-story, red-brick building with limestone trim and awning windows.

== History of Race, Roads, and Real Estate in Mozley Park ==
Mozley Park was an early epicenter of white flight in Atlanta, which had de facto residential segregation.

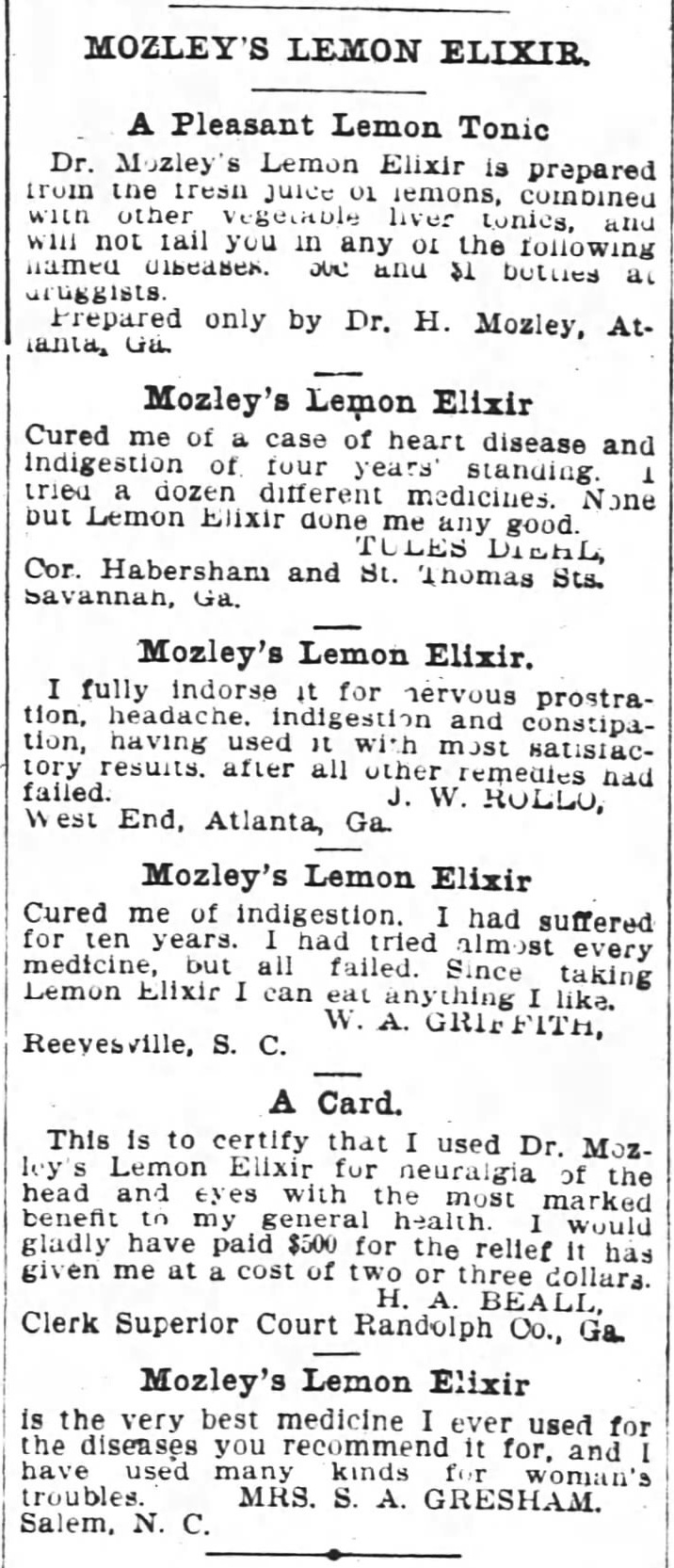
1899 Ad in Atlanta Constitution for the Lemon Elixir of Dr. Mozley

The neighborhood was located immediately west of the Ashby Street area, which underwent turbulence in the 1940s as many white sections of that neighborhood transitioned to black. In 1937, a black physician bought three lots in Mozley Park but abandoned his building plans after work crews were threatened. In 1941 city officials considered building a parkway that would serve as a physical barrier to black areas to Mozley Park's east. When this was not built, Westview Drive was used as a boundary, with anyone trying to build homes for blacks within 100 yards of the road threatened. Streets in black subdivisions north of Westview were unpaved for the last 100 yards nearest Westview. East of Chappell Road was also considered a black area.

In 1948, William A. Scott, Jr., an African American and the son of the Atlanta Daily World founder, built his home on the corner of Mozely Place and Chappell Road. But since it faced Mozely Place, this was seen as encroachment on the white area. White neighbors began to sell, which as was common in the day, caused mass selling by other white homeowners. In 1949 some white residents formed the Mozley Park Home Owners' Protective Association (MPHOPA) to stem the expansion of black residents, whose leaders stated their intentions to buy back homes in the "white" sections and establish a voluntary boundary line for "Negro expansion". The establishment of the MPHOPA was an important precedent in the city, as it was deemed, albeit erroneously, a "respectable" organization at the time, whereas previous efforts to halt black expansion were spearheaded by the Ku Klux Klan and other overtly racist organizations.

Due to the extreme shortage of housing in "black" areas of the city, however, it was extremely profitable for white homeowners to sell to black people. By 1950 black Realtists (real estate agents) refused to cooperate any longer with MPHOPA efforts and in September 1951 advertised a mass listing of Mozley Park homes in the black newspaper the Atlanta Daily World. Mayor William B. Hartsfield personally visited the black Realtists' board to ask them to let Westview Drive serve as a color line with blacks to the north and whites to the south; the Realtists accepted this proposal tentatively. White residents reorganized the MPHOPA into the much larger Southwest Citizens' Association and lobbied Mayor Hartsfield who in 1952 presented a plan to build a six-lane highway along Westview Drive — but financing stalled and it would only be built years later as part Interstate 20.

Nonetheless, black families still managed to move into houses north of Westview. By 1954 the mayor finally agreed to transfer the neighborhood park to be designated for use by blacks (parks in Atlanta were also segregated by race) and the racial transition of the neighborhood was virtually complete.

== Present day ==
In the 1950s and 1960s, public project developments, including the construction of Interstate 20, altered portions of the landscape in Mozley Park. Some older houses and streets have been demolished. But because of the minimal alterations to the majority of the houses, the neighborhood has maintained its integrity as an early 20th-century residential community.
