= Racial transformation =

Process by which a region changes in racial composition

Racial transformation is the process by which a demographic region (e.g., a country, neighborhood, or a school) changes in racial composition.

One example is the UK where the traditionally white population is declining over time and this will mean white Britons become a minority.

== See also ==
- Them: A Novel
- Transracial (identity)
