= Cascade Heights =

Neighborhood in Atlanta, Georgia, United States

Coordinates: 33°43′20″N 84°27′48″W

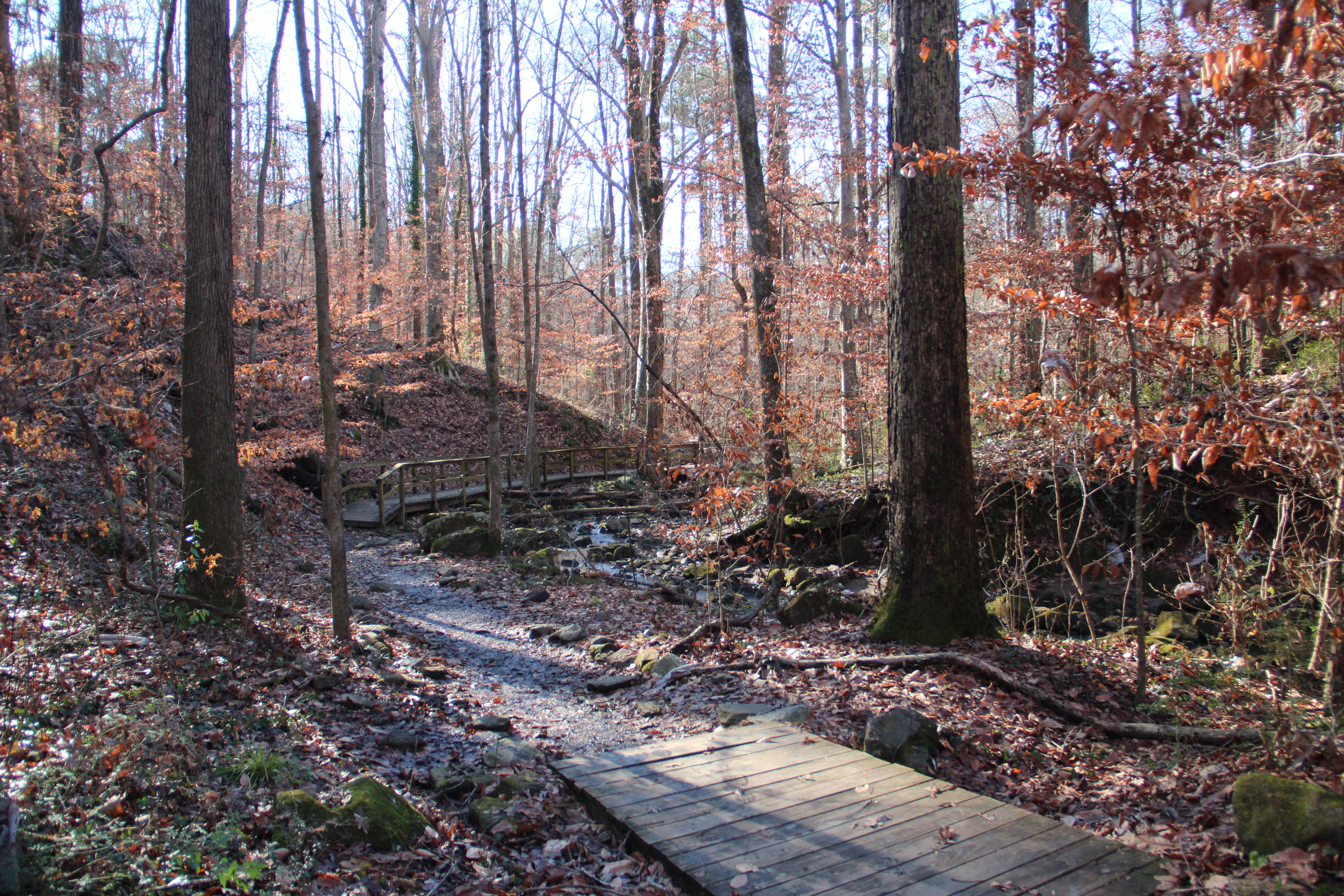
Cascade Springs Nature Preserve, a park in Cascade Heights

Cascade Heights is a historic neighborhood in southwest Atlanta. It is known for having the second most dense tree canopy in the city, rolling hills, large homes, and spacious lots.

== History ==
Cascade Heights is bisected by Cascade Road, which was known as Sandtown Road in the nineteenth century. This follows the path of the ancient Sandtown Trail, which ran from Stone Mountain to the Creek village of Sandtown on the Chattahoochee River, and from there on into Alabama. The name lived on even after the Indians were expelled in the 1830s.

After the Indian cession, settlement came quickly. Several roads in the area bear the names of early pioneers, including Willis Mill Road, Childress Drive, Herring Road, Dodson Drive, Head Road, and Sewell Road (since rechristened Benjamin E. Mays Drive).

Part of "Stone's District" in the nineteenth century, the area was dotted with small farms of white farming families, only a few of which were also home to enslaved African Americans.

By the time of the Civil War there was a post office at Utoy where the Sandtown Road crossed Utoy Creek, but no real community center aside from the post office, churches, and mills. Utoy Primitive Baptist Church and Mt. Gilead Methodist Church were both organized in 1824 and flourished throughout the nineteenth and into the twentieth century. In the nineteenth century, the revival camp meetings held at Mt. Gilead campground near Ben Hill from 1835 until 1989 drew thousands from all denominations in the area. Willis' Mill on the south fork of Utoy Creek and Herring's Mill on the north fork were critical for not only grinding corn and sawing lumber, but also for the chance to socialize. A cotton gin also operated on a site just west of what is now the Cascade Nature Preserve, and nearly everyone in the area would have used it at one time or another.

In early 1864, as the prospect of invasion by the Union army became real, defensive works were built that encircled Atlanta a mile and a half or so from the city center. As the Confederate army was pushed steadily before General Sherman's army in the spring of 1864, there were frantic attempts to extend the fortifications, including one line built southwest of the city along Sandtown Road. After the Confederate defeat at Kennesaw Mountain, the Union army's crossing of the Chattahoochee River in early July was followed by three battles fought later that month: the Battle of Peachtree Creek, north of the city, the so-called Battle of Atlanta on the east, and the Battle of Ezra Church on the west on July 27. During August, as Union artillery laid siege to the city, there were skirmishes all around the southwest side of the city as Sherman attempted to complete his encirclement of the city. On August 4–7, the Union and Confederate armies met at the Battle of Utoy Creek, fought in and around what is now the Cascade Nature Preserve. Union losses were put at 850, and the Confederate line held with a loss of only 35 killed, wounded, or missing.

The area remained mostly rural farmland throughout the nineteenth century. Cascade Springs was one of several sites around the city hoping to cash in on the rising middle class. In the springs near the old ford for the Sandtown Road over Turkeyfoot Creek was the genesis of Cascade Heights, or simply Cascade. The springs were christened "Cascade" after the three small waterfalls that spill away from the road, now in the northeast corner of the Cascade Spring Nature Preserve. A small resort developed there in the late nineteenth and early twentieth centuries. Very little remains besides a spring house sheltering the original spring.

Today the term "Cascade", much like "Midtown'", can refer to a much larger area than what is shown on official maps. Generally today Cascade might be bounded by I-20 on the north, I-285 on the west, the ridges on the south side of Utoy Creek, and the pre-1954 city limits around Greenwood Cemetery. In the period between the world wars, Adams Park and Beecher Hills began to develop, and after World War II, explosive suburban growth produced Audubon Forest, Peyton Forest, West Manor, Sewell Manor, and Mangum Manor, as the old farms in this part of Fulton County were subdivided and developed in the 1950s. In 1953, the area was annexed into the City of Atlanta.

=== Peyton Road Affair ===
In the early 1960s the area was a predominantly white neighborhood. After an African-American physician (Dr. Clinton E. Warner) bought a home in Peyton Forest, white residents in the area feared that their neighborhood would become a victim of blockbusting, a business practice in which real estate agents would profit from the racial fears of white residents while changing the racial makeup of a white residential area. When African Americans moved into a neighborhood, many whites believed that property values would automatically plunge, which was a self-fulfilling prophecy, as many homes went on the market at the same time as whites fled first West End and then Cascade Heights, Adams Park, and most of the rest of southwest Atlanta. Real estate agents stirred up racial tension and benefited from the commissions they earned when fearful homeowners sold their properties, often at a loss, in order to escape the area.

In an infamous 1962–63 episode that came to be called "the Peyton Road Affair", Atlanta mayor Ivan Allen responded to residents' fears of blockbusting by directing city staff to erect barricades on Peyton Road and Harlan Road to restrict access to Cascade Heights, thus preventing African-American homeseekers from getting to the neighborhood from Gordon Road (now MLK Drive). He took the action at the urging of white residents of southwest Atlanta (in particular, one of his high-level employees who lived a short distance from Peyton Road). After the barricades went up on December 18, 1962, the incident quickly drew national attention. The barrier was compared to the Berlin Wall and nicknamed the "Atlanta Wall". Newspapers in other parts of the country questioned Atlanta's motto, "the City Too Busy to Hate". The walls were torn down when, on March 1, 1963, a court ruled them to be unconstitutional. White homeowners fled the neighborhood after the barricades were removed. By the end of July 1963, only 15 white homeowners remained in Peyton Forest.

By the late 1960s, the Cascade Heights neighborhood was predominantly African-American. In the 1970s, the area became home to many affluent African-American business professionals, college professionals, celebrities, former pro athletes, and elected officials, and it remains so today.

A private or selective charter school K-12th grade education is common for middle and upper class children living in the Cascade Heights area. Since 2018, many improvements have come to the area since city living has become popular again.

== Notable people ==
Notable current and former residents of Cascade Heights include:

- Hank Aaron (1934–2021), baseball legend
- Keisha Lance Bottoms, former Atlanta mayor and director of the White House Office of Public Engagement
- Kandi Burruss, singer/songwriter, record producer, and cast member of The Real Housewives of Atlanta
- Shirley Franklin, former Atlanta mayor
- Maynard Jackson (1938–2003), first African American mayor of Atlanta
- Tayari Jones, author of An American Marriage
- John Lewis (1940–2020), civil rights leader and congressman
- Benjamin Mays, Ph.D. (1894–1984), president of Morehouse College 1940–1967
- Kasim Reed, former Atlanta mayor
- Ozell Sutton, past national president of Alpha Phi Alpha fraternity and founding member of the National Center for Missing and Exploited Children
- Andrew Young, former UN ambassador and Atlanta mayor
