= MARTA rail =

Rapid transit network in Atlanta, Georgia

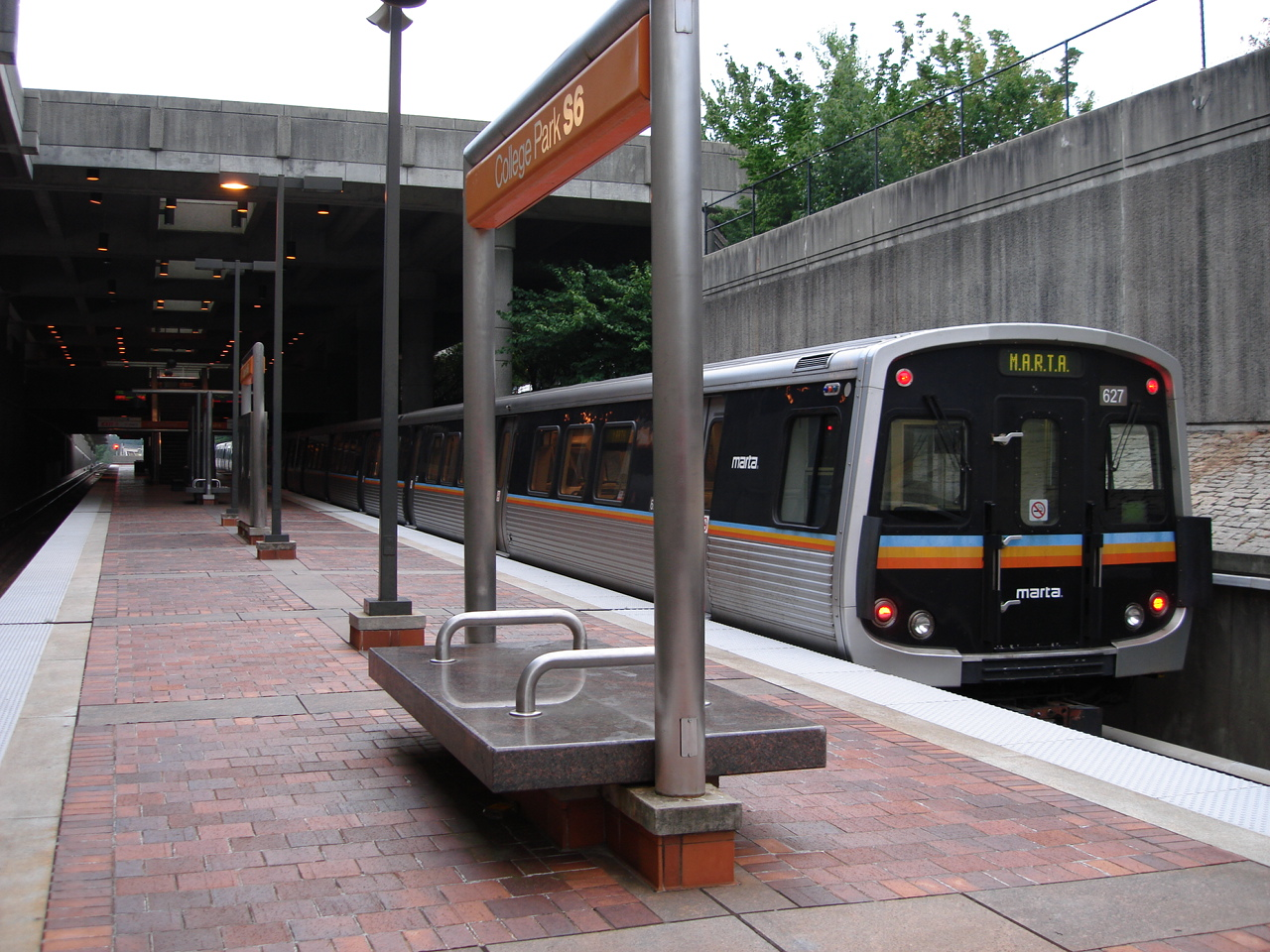
- A CQ312 Gold Line train leaving College Park station

Overview
- Owner: Metropolitan Atlanta Rapid Transit Authority
- Locale: Atlanta, Fulton and DeKalb Counties, Georgia
- Transit type: Rapid transit
- Line number: Red Line Gold Line Blue Line Green Line
- Number of stations: 38 (Five Points, 11 North, 4 Northeast, 7 South, 9 East, 5 West, 1 Proctor Creek)
- Daily ridership: 152,000 (weekdays, Q2 2026)
- Annual ridership: 30,373,600 (2025)

Operation
- Began operation: June 30, 1979; 47 years ago
- Character: Elevated, underground, at-grade

Technical
- System length: 48 mi (77 km)
- Track gauge: 4 ft 8 1/2 in (1,435 mm) standard gauge
- Electrification: Third rail, 750 V DC
System map
Key
Red Line	Gold Line	Blue Line	Green Line	multiple lines

The MARTA rail network, a component of the Metropolitan Atlanta Rapid Transit Authority system in Metro Atlanta, has four service lines: the Red, Gold, Blue, and Green lines. The lines span 48 miles (77 km) in Atlanta and the surrounding suburbs along two general corridors. The Red and Gold lines mainly run along the north–northeast corridor, and the Blue and Green Lines run along the east–west corridor. The two corridors connect at the Five Points station, which is the only station where transfers are possible between all four lines. In 2025, the system had a ridership of 30,373,600, or about 152,000 per weekday as of the second quarter of 2026.

The rail system was approved by voters in Dekalb and Fulton counties in 1971 and began operation on June 30, 1979, with the East Line between Avondale and Georgia State stations. The last major expansion opened on December 16, 2000, in Sandy Springs.

== History ==
The Metropolitan Atlanta Rapid Transit Authority (MARTA) was created through an act passed by the Georgia General Assembly in 1965 to provide regional transit service to five counties in Metro Atlanta. The initial plan for a rapid transit system, developed by the local metropolitan planning organization as well as Atlanta Transit, covered 50 miles (80 km) in four counties. It was rejected by voters on November 6, 1968. A measure in Dekalb and Fulton counties was passed in 1971 and established a one-percent sales tax to fund MARTA operations and construction. A $900 million grant from the federal government was awarded to MARTA for the rail system; the funds had originally been earmarked for a rejected rapid transit system in Seattle. Construction began with a groundbreaking ceremony on February 20, 1975.

The first section of the rail system opened on June 30, 1979, between Avondale and Georgia State on 4.6 miles (7.4 km) of the East Line. A second line, the West Line, opened on December 22 with 11.8 miles (19.0 km) of tracks between Hightower (H.E. Holmes) and Five Points stations. The North Line opened on December 4, 1981, as a 2-mile (3.2 km) stub that connected Five Points to Garnett in the south and North Avenue in the north. It was extended north to Arts Center and south to West End by December 1982. A major extension of the North Line opened on June 8, 1996, with three stations extending to Medical Center station in Sandy Springs. Two more stations in Sandy Springs opened on December 16, 2000.

Attempts to expand MARTA further into the suburban counties were rejected by voters several times; these attempts were stymied by campaigns that used racial politics targeted at the white electorate in those counties. The lines names were changed to colors in October 2009; the initial use of the "Yellow Line" was replaced by the "Gold Line" due to its presence in Doraville, an area with a large Asian American community. Atlanta mayor Andre Dickens announced plans for four infill stations, including one at Murphy Crossing on the Southside of the Beltline, on March 25, 2024.

== Lines ==
All MARTA trains are identified with a destination on electronic LCD signs on the front and sides of the train and on each car. An automated announcement system announces train destinations, bus and other transit connections, and landmarks that are at or near each rail station. During daytime hours, trains on the Red and Gold lines service the entire north-south trunk line and split north of Lindbergh Center (N6). After 9pm, and also during single-tracking, the Red Line is short-turned and runs as a shuttle between North Springs (N11) and Lindbergh Center (N6), connecting to the Gold Line at Lindbergh Center. The connection is scheduled, with southbound Red trains arriving at Lindbergh Center just before Gold trains continuing southbound, and in reverse, northbound Gold trains arrive at Lindbergh just before Red trains leave northbound.

Blue and Green lines service the east-west trunk line together between Ashby (W3) and Edgewood–Candler Park (E4). At Ashby, Blue Line service continues to H.E. Holmes (W5) while Green Line trains divert to Bankhead Station (P4). Green Line service terminates at Edgewood–Candler Park, while the Blue Line continues east to Indian Creek. After 9pm, Green Line service is short-turned and operates as a shuttle between Bankhead (P4) and Vine City (stop W2). On weekends before 9pm, Green Line service is short-turned at King Memorial (stop E2).

Older system maps used orange to denote the North-South line and blue for the East-West line, including the Northeast and Proctor Creek branches. Lines were identified by the direction of travel and/or terminals. MARTA switched to a color-based route naming system in October 2009, so the Proctor Creek or Bankhead-Edgewood line became the Green Line, for example. The former Northeast line that served Doraville, known as the "heart of Atlanta's Asian community", was initially named the Yellow Line, which the Asian American community found derogatory. It was renamed to the Gold Line in 2010 in response to the complaints.

== Operations ==
The MARTA rail system operates between approximately 4:45 a.m. and 1 a.m. Monday through Friday, and 6 a.m. to 1 a.m. Saturdays and Sundays.

Historical system headways
Period		Headway (min.)					
Period		1979–2005	2005–2020	2020–2023	2023–2024	2024–2025	2025–Present
Weekday	Rush (6–9 AM & 3–7 PM)	8	10	15	12	10	10
Weekday	Non-rush	8	12	15	15	12	12
Weekday	Nights (9 PM+)	15	20	20	20	20	20
Weekends		10/15	20	20	20	20	15

Originally, MARTA operated trains every eight minutes during the day on weekdays on each route. When two routes operated on the same tracks, the effective headway was cut in half, and the North-South Line operated on a combined four-minute headway between Lindbergh Center and Airport stations on the trunk. On Saturdays, it was every ten minutes (five minutes combined on the North-South Line trunk), and on Sundays it was every 15 minutes (7.5 minutes on the North-South Line trunk). At night, trains operated every 15 minutes.

After budget cuts in 2005 affected the rail system, headways were increased by 25–50% to 10 minutes weekdays during rush hour and 12 minutes during midday, and 20 minutes nightly and weekends. For combined service, headways increased to 5 minutes during rush hour and 6 minutes during midday and 10 minutes on the weekends during the day. All rail lines operate 20 minutes during late night (8:30pm weekdays, 8:50pm weekends) as the Red Line was short-turned and only ran from North Springs to Lindbergh Center; likewise the Green Line was short turned and operated from Bankhead to Vine City.

Due to the COVID-19 pandemic in Atlanta, train headways were reduced to 15 minute intervals between trains during most weekday hours and 20 minutes at other times. In August 2023, MARTA announced that frequencies would increase to every 12 minutes on all rail lines between 6 a.m. and 9 a.m. and 2:30 p.m. and 7:30 p.m. Following the increase, headways would be every 6 minutes along the interlined portion of the network. In December 2024, they announced that frequencies would increase again back to their pre-pandemic headways of every 10 minutes between 6 a.m. and 9 a.m. and 3 p.m. and 7 p.m and every 12 minutes during off-peak hours on weekdays.

Due to ongoing rail system maintenance, weekend headways were variable and could range from the normal 20 minutes to as much as 24 minutes, with the Green and Red lines being truncated in up to 80% of weekends in 2024. During weekends in the latter case, headways along the shared lines will increase from 10 minutes to 20 minutes.

In April 2025, MARTA announced weekend headway improvements for the first time since the 2005 service cuts, bringing frequencies back to 15 minutes. Red Line trains will serve Airport station at all times.

=== Ridership ===
In 2025, the MARTA rail system carried a total of 30,373,600 passenger trips. It ranked eighth among U.S. rapid transit systems. Ridership remains below levels recorded before the COVID-19 pandemic; in 2019, the system carried 64 million total passengers. By February 2023, weekday ridership had only reached 50 percent of its pre-pandemic level while weekends were at 62 percent. The counting methodology used by MARTA was primarily based on faregate data until it was switched to estimates based on samples of manual passenger counts aboard trains in January 2026.

=== Fares ===
Currently, the one-way full fare for MARTA costs US$2.50. Passengers over 65, passengers with disabilities and Medicare recipients are eligible for discounted fares. MARTA also offers unlimited travel through multiple transit pass options ranging from one day to 30 days. Rail stations have fare gates at their entrances, which accept payment using MARTA's Breeze Card or credit/debit cards.

The primary form of payment is the Breeze Card, a contactless smart card that allows riders to load stored value and add prepaid passes. In 2026, MARTA introduced a new system with updated faregates designed to support more contactless payment methods, like mobile wallet and debit/credit cards equipped with near-field communication (NFC). A new app was made with support for digital cards. New touchscreen ticket vending machines were also added and are available at various retail locations. Implementation is scheduled to be completed the following year in preparation for the 2026 FIFA World Cup.

== Stations ==
Each station also has a secondary designation that provides the cardinal direction (typically north, south, east, or west) and relative distance from the central Five Points station. For instance, Lindbergh Center is the sixth station from Five Points traveling north, and has the secondary designation (N6). Northeast of Lindbergh Center on the Gold Line, stations are designated with NE while continuing the numbering, so Lenox is (NE7). Similarly, Bankhead is on a branch from the main east-west trunk and is designated (P4), a legacy of the original Proctor Creek name for the Green Line.

Many suburban stations offer designated free daily and paid long term parking in MARTA-operated park and ride lots. These stations also have designated kiss and ride passenger drop off parking spaces closest to the stations' entrances. MARTA maintains a total of 19,602 parking stalls at its rail stations.

Key

- † denotes a terminal station
- Until 1994, the NE codes were designated as N

Station	Code	Lines	Jurisdiction	Structure	Opened	Average Weekday Entries (2019)	Ref.
Airport†	S7		College Park	Elevated	June 18, 1988	9,228	
Arts Center	N5		Atlanta	Underground	December 18, 1982	6,340	
Ashby	W3		Atlanta	Underground	December 22, 1979	1,419	
Avondale	E7		Decatur	At-grade	June 30, 1979	2,482	
Bankhead†	P4		Atlanta	Elevated	December 12, 1992	889	
Brookhaven/Oglethorpe	NE8		Brookhaven	Elevated	December 15, 1984	2,156	
Buckhead	N7		Atlanta	At-grade	June 8, 1996	3,001	
Chamblee	NE9		Chamblee	Elevated	December 19, 1987	3,201	
Civic Center	N2		Atlanta	Underground, elevated	December 4, 1981	2,209	
College Park	S6		College Park	Open-cut	June 18, 1988	8,061	
Decatur	E6		Decatur	Underground	June 30, 1979	2,759	
Doraville†	NE10		Doraville	Elevated	December 12, 1992	4,967	
Dunwoody	N9		Dunwoody	Elevated	June 8, 1996	3,089	
East Lake	E5		Atlanta/Decatur	At-grade	June 30, 1979	1,199	
East Point	S5		East Point	Open-cut	August 16, 1986	5,743	
Edgewood/Candler Park	E4		Atlanta	Elevated	June 30, 1979	1,061	
Five Points*	0		Atlanta	Underground	December 4, 1981	14,713	
Five Points*	0		Atlanta	At-grade	December 22, 1979	14,713	
Garnett	S1		Atlanta	Elevated	December 4, 1981	1,287	
Georgia State	E1		Atlanta	Elevated	June 30, 1979	3,826	
SEC District	W1		Atlanta	At grade	December 22, 1979	1,105	
H. E. Holmes†	W5		Atlanta	Elevated	December 22, 1979	5,164	
Indian Creek†	E9		Unincorporated DeKalb County	At-grade	June 26, 1993	4,107	
Inman Park/Reynoldstown	E3		Atlanta	At-grade	June 30, 1979	2,259	
Kensington	E8		Unincorporated DeKalb County	At-grade	June 26, 1993	4,902	
King Memorial	E2		Atlanta	Elevated	June 30, 1979	1,251	
Lakewood/Fort McPherson	S4		Atlanta / East Point	Embankment	December 15, 1984	2,821	
Lenox	NE7		Atlanta	Underground	December 15, 1984	2,456	
Lindbergh Center	N6		Atlanta	Open-cut	December 15, 1984	6,925	
Medical Center	N8		Sandy Springs	At-grade	June 8, 1996	1,461	
Midtown	N4		Atlanta	Underground	December 18, 1982	5,367	
North Avenue	N3		Atlanta	Underground	December 4, 1981	5,273	
North Springs†	N11		Sandy Springs	Elevated	December 16, 2000	6,036	
Oakland City	S3		Atlanta	Embankment	December 15, 1984	3,436	
Peachtree Center	N1		Atlanta	Underground	September 11, 1982	8,821	
Sandy Springs	N10		Sandy Springs	Underground	December 16, 2000	2,965	
Vine City	W2		Atlanta	At-grade	December 22, 1979	607	
West End	S2		Atlanta	Elevated	September 11, 1982	5,029	
West Lake	W4		Atlanta	At-grade	December 22, 1979	1,149	

== Rolling stock ==
MARTA currently operates a total of 312 married pair rail cars which can operate at speeds of up to 70 miles per hour (110 km/h). The trains are powered by an electrified third rail and can be operated in any combination from two to eight rail cars, with six cars being the normal length for the Blue, Red and Gold rail lines, and two cars for the Green line (due to the shorter platform at Bankhead).

MARTA rail fleet specifications
Type	Manufacturer	Image	Fleet #	Years	Quantity built	In service	Notes
CQ310	Société Franco-Belge		101–200	1979–1981	98	94	111/112 converted to a work unit.103/104 scrapped after 2019 derailment.
CQ310	Société Franco-Belge		501–520	1979–1981	20	0	All single units. Cars retired in 2006 and stored at Avondale Yard until 2023. Currently in the process of disposal in preparation for delivery of CQ400 pilot cars. Units 509 and 510 preserved by the Southeastern Railway Museum and the Trolley Museum of New York, respectively. Some of the cars were dumped into the Atlantic Ocean for use as an artificial reef.
CQ311	Hitachi		201–320	1984–1988	120	118	All units received life extension work from Kinki Sharyo. Two units scrapped after damage from an incident.
CQ312	AnsaldoBreda		601–664, 667–702	2001–2005	100	98	Two cars were retired in 2023 due to mechanical issues and were reefed later that year.
CQ400	Stadler Rail		TBA	2025–Present	254 on order + 100 options	0	Currently on order. Scheduled to enter service in 2026. Will gradually replace all current rail cars.

In 2002, Alstom was contracted by MARTA to overhaul 98 CQ310 cars and all 120 CQ311 cars as part of a $246 million refurbishment contract. The rehabilitated cars feature upgraded passenger amenities and upgraded propulsion and train control hardware. The first rehabilitated cars began service on March 12, 2006. The rehabilitation was completed on February 23, 2009.

In 2011, Alstom was awarded an additional $117 million 5-year contract with MARTA to upgrade its train control and SCADA systems. The new technology is designed to provide MARTA's rail team with more efficient operations, better communication between trains and stations, enhanced monitoring capabilities, quicker response times, and reduced maintenance costs. Included in the project is an upgrade for all 318 rail cars to install an enhanced Fault Identification and Monitoring System (FIMS) and full color driver's display built by Quester Tangent. The new systems passed "mini fleet" testing in 2015.

On December 1, 2017, MARTA posted a notice of intent to award a $146 million contract for the "Rail Car Life Extension Program" to Kinki Sharyo International LLC. On January 26, 2018, Kinki Sharyo signed the $146 million rail car refurbishment contract. The work starts with 118 cars, with 94 more options.

On March 29, 2019, Stadler Rail was awarded the contract to manufacture up to 354 new CQ400 rail cars for MARTA. These cars, which will enter into service in 2026, will replace the entire fleet of CQ310, CQ311, and CQ312 trains and provide expansion to the rail fleet.

== See also ==
- List of metro systems
- Transportation in Atlanta
