= Ashby station (MARTA) =

MARTA rail station

W3 Ashby
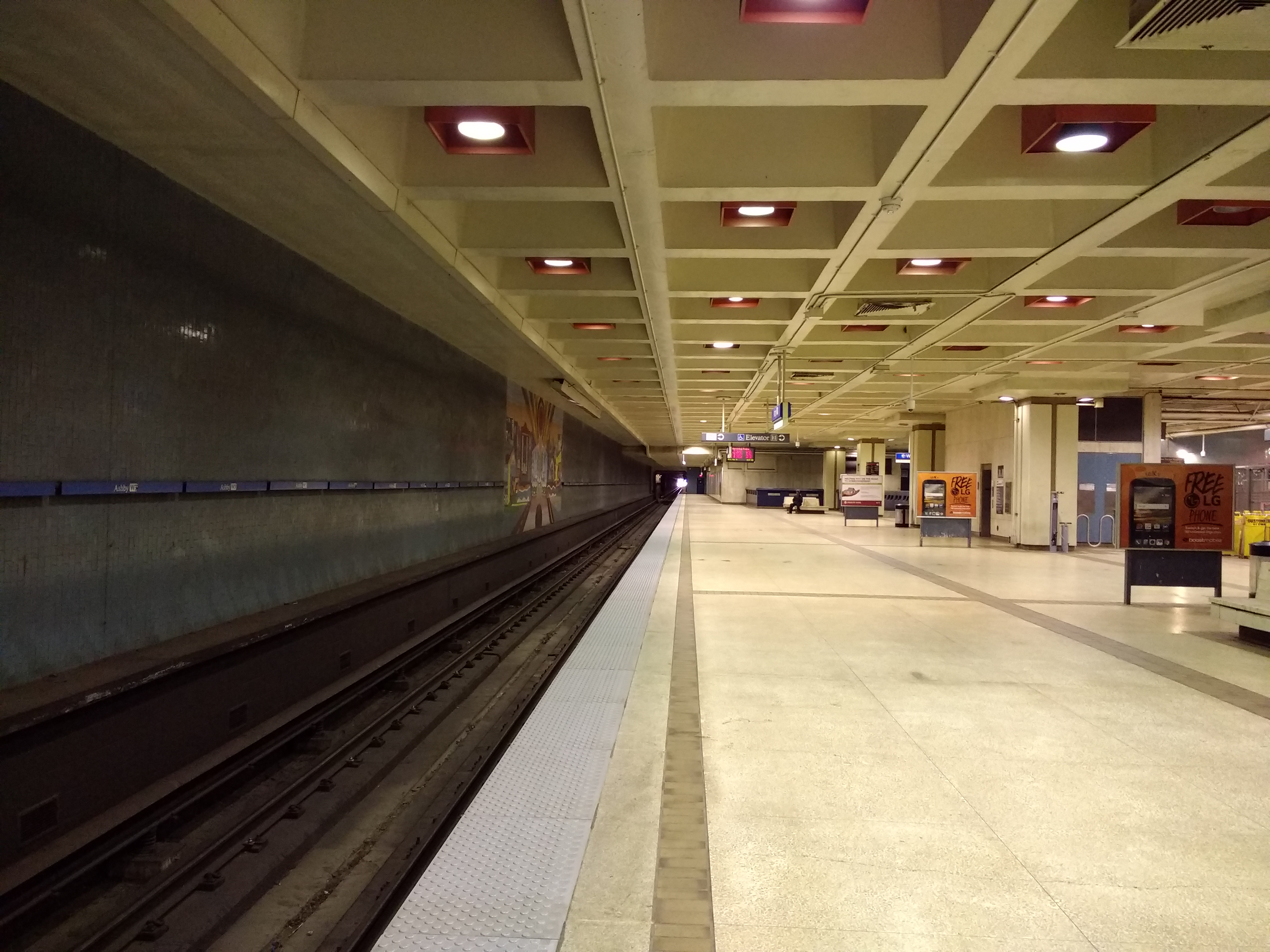
- Ashby Station

General information
- Location: 65 Joseph E. Lowery Boulevard NW; Atlanta, GA 30314
- Coordinates: 33.756346°N 84.417556°W
- Owner: MARTA
- Platforms: 2 split platforms (1 on each level)
- Tracks: 2 (1 on each level)
- Connections: MARTA Bus: 1, 68

Construction
- Structure type: Underground
- Parking: daily parking
- Cycle facilities: None
- Accessible: YES

Other information
- Station code: W3

History
- Opened: December 22, 1979; 46 years ago

Passengers
- 2013: 1,791 (avg. weekday) ▲16%

Services
Preceding station	MARTA	Following station
West Lake toward Hamilton E. Holmes	Blue Line	Vine City toward Indian Creek
Bankhead Terminus	Green Line	Vine City toward King Memorial or Edgewood/Candler Park
Bankhead Terminus	Green Line Nighttime service	Vine City Terminus
Location

Ashby is an underground subway station in Atlanta, Georgia, serving the Blue and Green lines of the Metropolitan Atlanta Rapid Transit Authority (MARTA) rail system. It incorporates the use of split platforms, where the westbound platform is on the upper level and the eastbound platform is on the lower level. This is to facilitate the Green Line's split toward Bankhead, immediately west of this station.

== History ==
Ashby was opened on December 22, 1979 along with all other stations west of Five Points, including the Five Points East/West section itself and excluding Bankhead. Ashby is part of the second oldest section of MARTA, only preceded by the stations east of Five Points.

In 2007 Ashby was proposed to be renamed after Joseph E. Lowery, the current name of Ashby Street, while a different proposal by councilman Ivory Lee Young, Jr. suggested changing it to Historic Westside Village station, after the mixed-use development adjacent to the station.

== Station layout ==
G	Street Level	Exit/Entrance
2F; Platform level	Westbound	← Green Line toward Bankhead (Terminus) ← Blue Line toward H. E. Holmes (West Lake)
2F; Platform level	Side platform, doors will open on the left
3F; Platform level	Eastbound	Green Line toward Edgewood / Candler Park (weekends toward King Memorial, nights toward Vine City) → Blue Line toward Indian Creek (Vine City) →
3F; Platform level	Side platform, doors will open on the right

== Attractions ==
- Atlanta University Center
- The Busy Bee Café
- Washington Park
- BeltLine Westside Trail

== Bus service ==
The station is served by the following MARTA bus routes:

- Route 1 - Marietta Boulevard / Joseph E. Lowery Boulevard
- Route 68 - Benjamin E. Mays Drive

== See also ==
- MARTA rail
