= Vine City station =

MARTA rail station

W2 Vine City
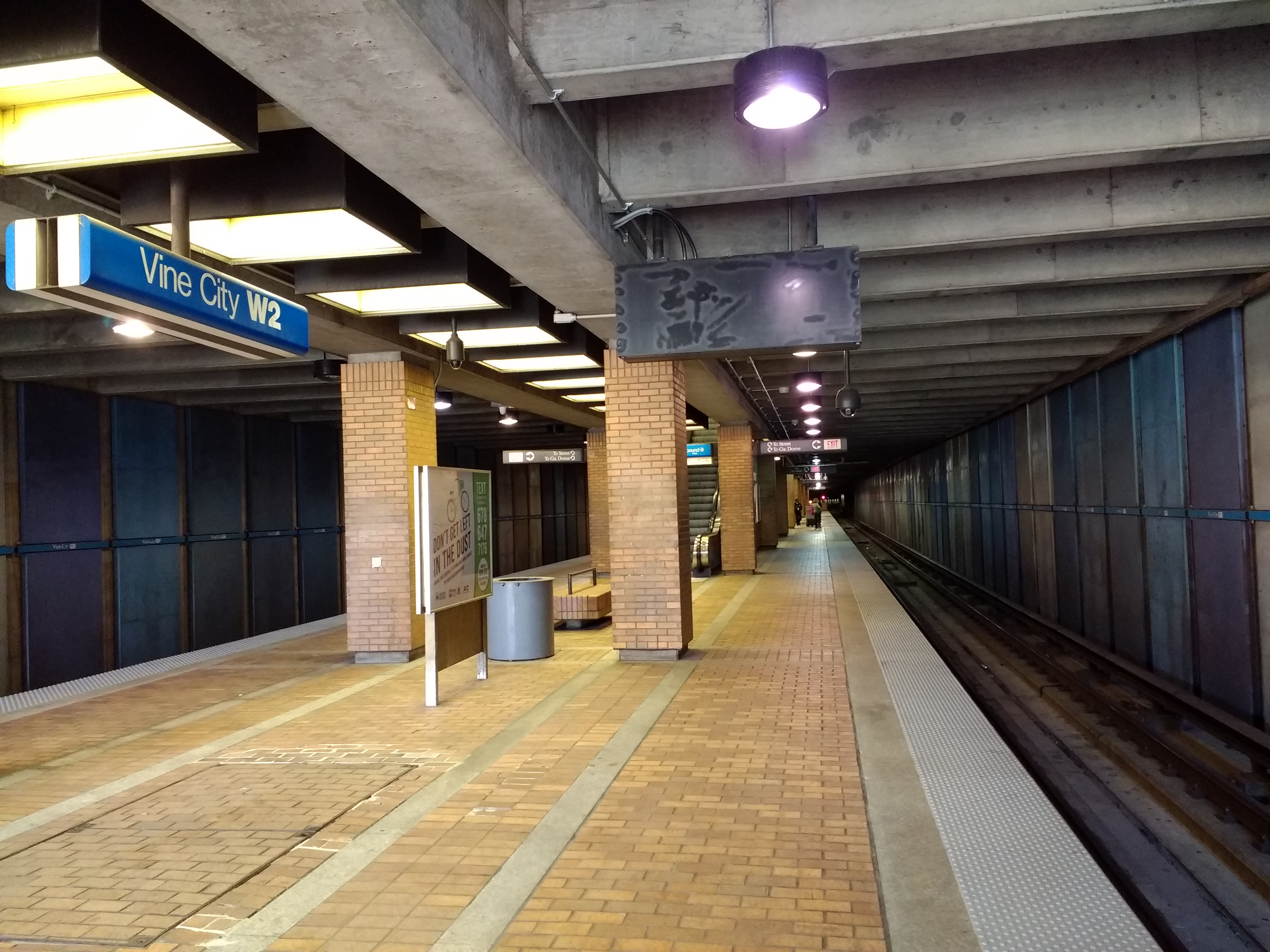

General information
- Location: 502 Rhodes Street NW; Atlanta, GA 30314
- Coordinates: 33.75687°N 84.40391°W
- Owner: MARTA
- Platforms: 1 island platform
- Tracks: 2
- Connections: MARTA Bus: 94

Construction
- Structure type: Open-cut
- Parking: 27 spaces; Limited daily parking
- Cycle facilities: 15 bike racks
- Accessible: YES

Other information
- Station code: W2

History
- Opened: December 22, 1979; 46 years ago

Passengers
- 2013: 821 (avg. weekday) 0%

Services
Preceding station	MARTA	Following station
Ashby toward Hamilton E. Holmes	Blue Line	SEC District toward Indian Creek
Ashby toward Bankhead	Green Line	SEC District toward King Memorial or Edgewood/Candler Park
Ashby toward Bankhead	Green Line Nights	Terminus
Location

Vine City is a below grade subway station in Atlanta, Georgia, serving the Blue and Green lines of the Metropolitan Atlanta Rapid Transit Authority (MARTA) rail system. It is one of only two stations served by the Green and Blue lines at all times.

Vine City primarily provides access to the Vine City area, overflow service to Mercedes-Benz Stadium, as well as access to the Atlanta University Center. It also features 27 parking spaces in a small on-site lot. Due to its dense location, it is not directly served with bus service; however, bus service is provided along the streets surrounding the station and at the nearby Hamilton E. Holmes station or Five Points station.

As of 2013, Vine City only had a weekday average of 821 entries, making it the least busy station.

== Station layout ==
G	Street Level	Exit/Entrance, station house
2F; Platform level	Westbound	← Green Line toward Bankhead (Ashby) ← Blue Line toward H. E. Holmes (Ashby)
2F; Platform level	Island platform, doors will open on the left
2F; Platform level	Eastbound	Green Line toward Edgewood / Candler Park (King Memorial weekends) (SEC District) → Green Line nighttime termination track → Blue Line toward Indian Creek (SEC District) →

== History ==
Vine City was opened on December 22, 1979, making it part of the second oldest section of MARTA, as every other west station (denoted with a "W" in their station code) was opened on the same day, including the East-West section of Five Points. Although it is now part of the Green and Blue Lines, both were originally one line, The East-West Line. It was considered one line from its launch until 2006 when the West branch and the Proctor Creek branch were redesignated as the East-West Line (the current Blue Line) and the Proctor Creek Line (the current Green Line). 3 years later in 2009, MARTA switched over the color system, giving us the modern day Green and Blue Lines.

The area it serves, Vine City, was mostly industrial in the early 20th century, being just south of Atlanta's largest power plant, the Davis Street Plant. As of 2015, some of the areas west of Northside Drive are largely abandoned and primed for redevelopment.

== Bus Routes ==
The station is served by the following MARTA bus routes:

- Route 94 - Northside Drive

== Nearby areas ==
The area around Vine City station includes a mix of residential and commercial development, but is dominated by other uses, such as stadiums and college campuses.

Landmarks include:

- Mercedes-Benz Stadium
- Morehouse College
- Clark Atlanta University
- Spelman College
- Morris Brown College
- Black Music & Entertainment Walk of Fame
- Herndon Stadium
