= Five Points station =

MARTA rail station

Five Points
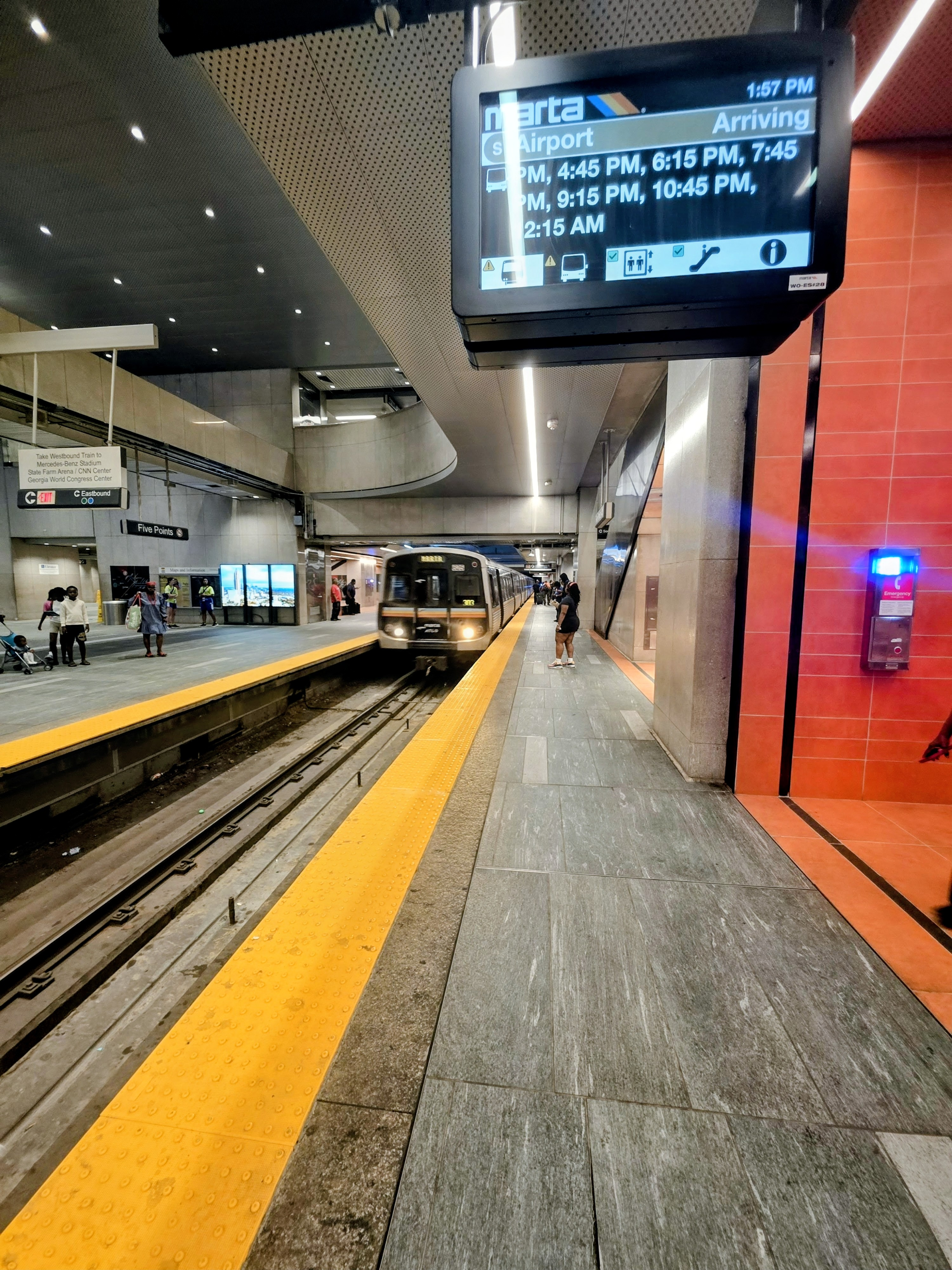
- Southbound train at Five Points in 2026

General information
- Location: 20 Broad St SW; Atlanta, GA 30303
- Coordinates: 33.753826°N 84.391571°W
- Platforms: 4 side platforms (two per level); 2 island platforms (one per level)
- Tracks: 4 (2 per level)
- Connections: MARTA Bus: 3, 21, 40, 49, 55, 107, 186, 813, CobbLinc; Ride Gwinnett

Construction
- Structure type: Underground (Red and Gold Lines); At-grade (Blue and Green Lines)
- Platform levels: 1 for Blue and Green Lines, 1 for Red and Gold Lines, plus a third concourse level for faregates, and additionally a plaza level.
- Parking: None
- Cycle facilities: None
- Accessible: Yes
- Architect: Finch-Heery

History
- Opened: December 22, 1979; 46 years ago (East-West); December 4, 1981; 44 years ago (North-South)

Passengers
- 2013: 19,447 (avg. weekday) ▼3.43%

Services
Preceding station	MARTA	Following station
Garnett toward Airport	Gold Line	Peachtree Center toward Doraville
Garnett toward Airport	Red Line	Peachtree Center toward North Springs
SEC District toward Hamilton E. Holmes	Blue Line	Georgia State toward Indian Creek
SEC District toward Bankhead	Green Line	Georgia State toward King Memorial or Edgewood/Candler Park
Location

Five Points is a subway station in Downtown Atlanta that serves as the main transportation hub for MARTA. The station is served by all four lines on the MARTA rail network and provides access to the Five Points Business District, Georgia State University, Underground Atlanta, City Hall, the Richard B. Russell Federal Building, and the tourism heart of Downtown Atlanta. It is served by MARTA, CobbLinc, and Ride Gwinnett bus routes.

Despite being considered a subway, only the Red and Gold Lines are underground and use a tunnel under Broad Street between Garnett and Peachtree Center. The Blue and Green Lines, on the second level, are located at-grade below the intersecting elevated street viaducts in Downtown Atlanta. The station opened on December 22, 1979, along with the rest of the West Line (now part of the Blue Line). As of May 17th, 2025, a $230 million transformation project is underway with the goal of constructing a new canopy, improving pedestrian routing, and bringing community-focused enhancements.

== History ==
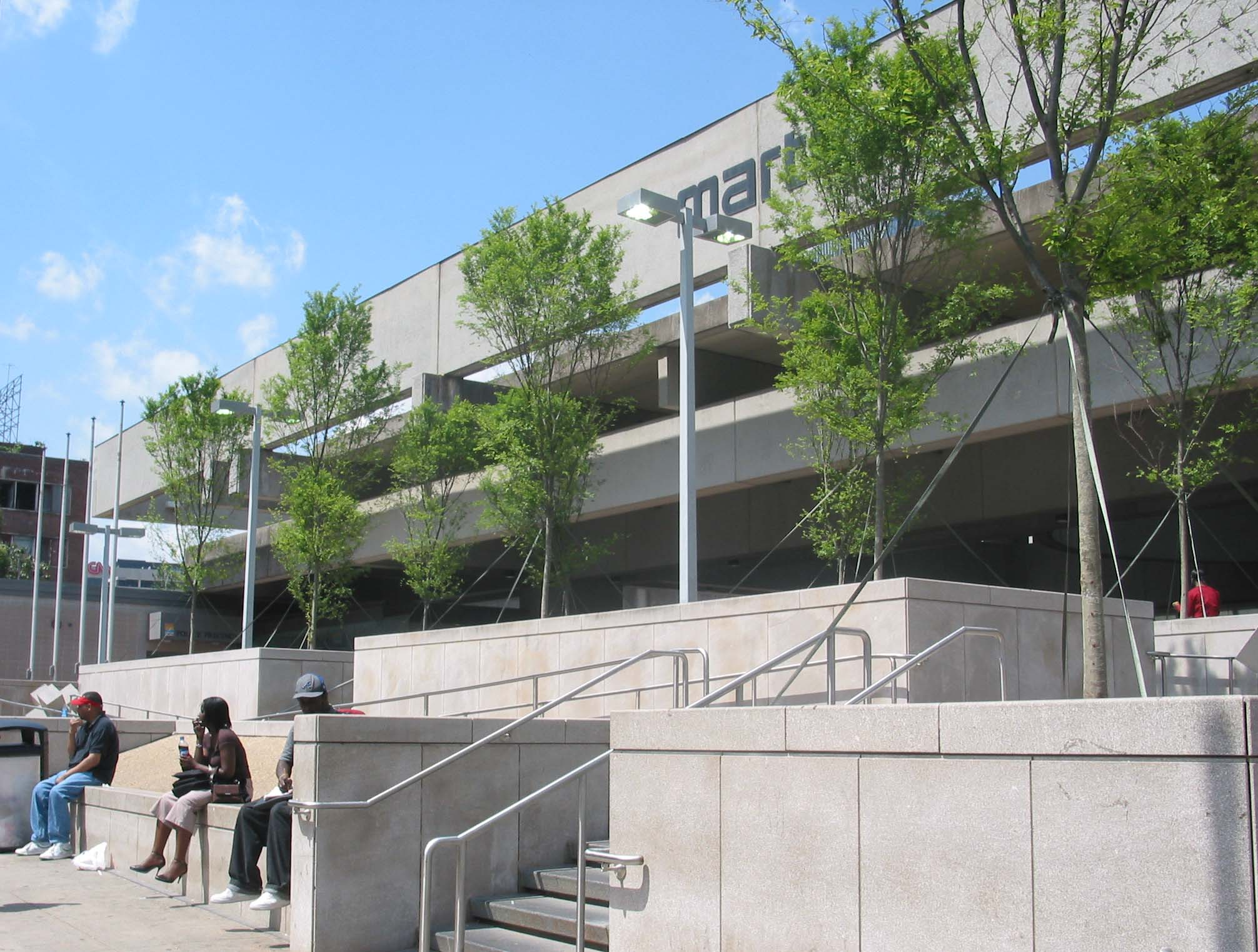
Five Points station building

Preliminary planning and design of the entire MARTA heavy rail system began in 1967 after Georgia state legislature approval of MARTA's 1966 creation, with early blueprints ready in mid-1968. Design and engineering began in 1973; existing properties were acquired, demolished and underwent site preparation in 1974–1975, and actual construction began in early 1976. The station was constructed using the cut-and-cover method. The Gold Line (then called North-South line) was built beneath Broad Street, and the Blue Line (then called East-West line) was constructed next to the railroad freight lines that run through Downtown Atlanta. Five Points opened on December 22, 1979 with only the original East-West platform open. The initial opening of the station was almost delayed because of construction on the lower level. The North-South platform did not open until December 4, 1981. Initially the platform levels were intended to be air conditioned, but exfiltration through unenclosed tunnels and stairways made cooling ineffective. The now unused ventilation shafts remain along Peachtree St. Major renovations to both the east and west street-level plazas of the station began in April 2006.

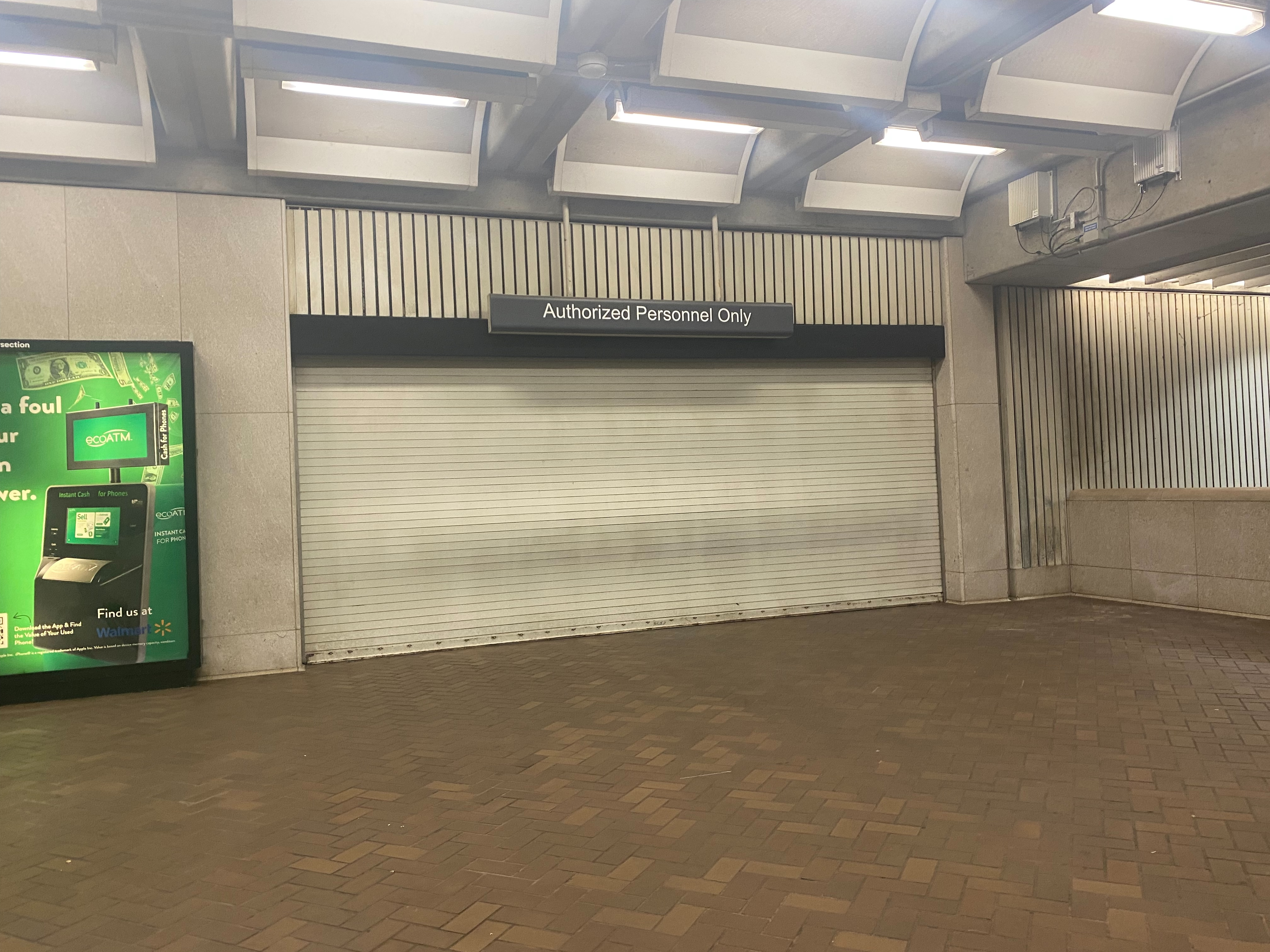
Former entrance to Underground Atlanta

In 2016, a section of the station was converted into a small soccer field funded by MARTA and Atlanta United FC, the city's new Major League Soccer team. A tunnel to Underground Atlanta was located on the Peachtree Street side of the station, just outside of the faregates. It closed in 2017, in combination with the closure of Underground Atlanta for renovations, and is now inaccessible from both Five Points and Underground Atlanta. Another tunnel existed that led to Rich's (department store) from 1979 to 1991 when the department store was closed, and eventually demolished in 1994. The tunnel remains and is now an employee entrance to the Sam Nunn Atlanta Federal Center.

In 2019, MARTA announced plans to renovate Five Points alongside a bus network redesign. The MARTA board hired architectural firm Skidmore, Owings & Merrill to design the station in June 2021. The new design completely replaced the existing concrete canopy with one made of glass and timber and included green space and eight bus bays on the surrounding streets. Construction was scheduled to start in July 2024 and be completed in 2028, with the station temporarily reopening for the 2026 FIFA World Cup games, but MARTA decided to postpose any work that required closing pedestrian access to the station following requests from Mayor Andre Dickens and the Atlanta City Council. Renovation work finally began in May 2025 following the approval of demolition permits.

== Station layout ==
1F	Street Level	Forsyth and Alabama Streets, plaza level
G	Concourse	Peachtree Street, fare barriers
B1; Platform level	Side platform, doors will open on the right
B1; Platform level	Westbound	← Green Line toward Bankhead (SEC District) ← Blue Line toward H. E. Holmes (SEC District)
B1; Platform level	Island platform, doors will open on the left
B1; Platform level	Eastbound	Green Line toward Edgewood / Candler Park (weekends toward King Memorial) (Georgia State) → Blue Line toward Indian Creek (Georgia State) →
B1; Platform level	Side platform, doors will open on the right
B2; Platform level	Side platform, doors will open on the right
B2; Platform level	Southbound	← Red Line, Gold Line toward Airport (Garnett)
B2; Platform level	Island platform, doors will open on the left
B2; Platform level	Northbound	Gold Line toward Doraville (Peachtree Center) → Red Line toward North Springs (Peachtree Center) →
B2; Platform level	Side platform, doors will open on the right

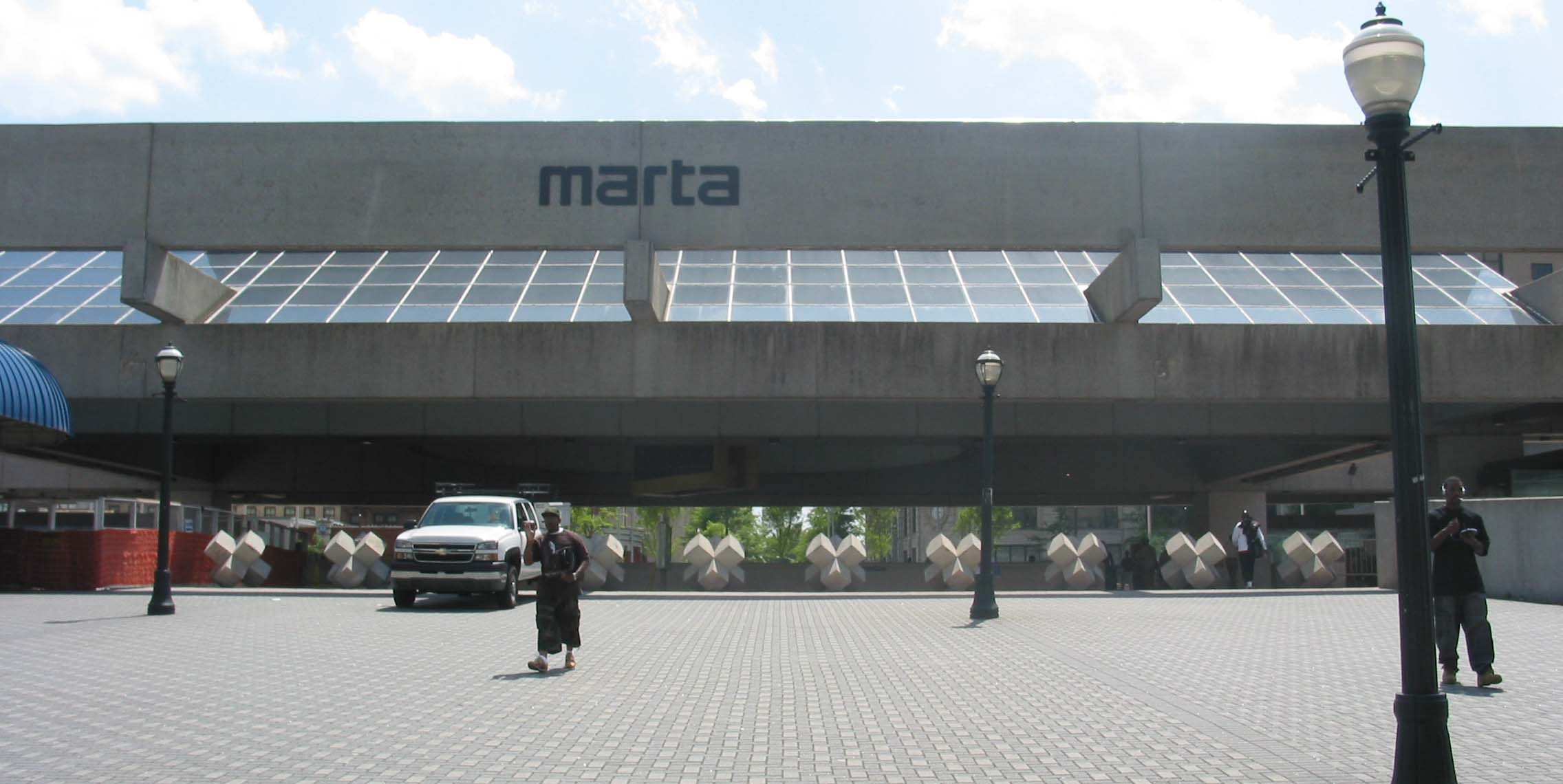
Plaza entrance to the Five Points station

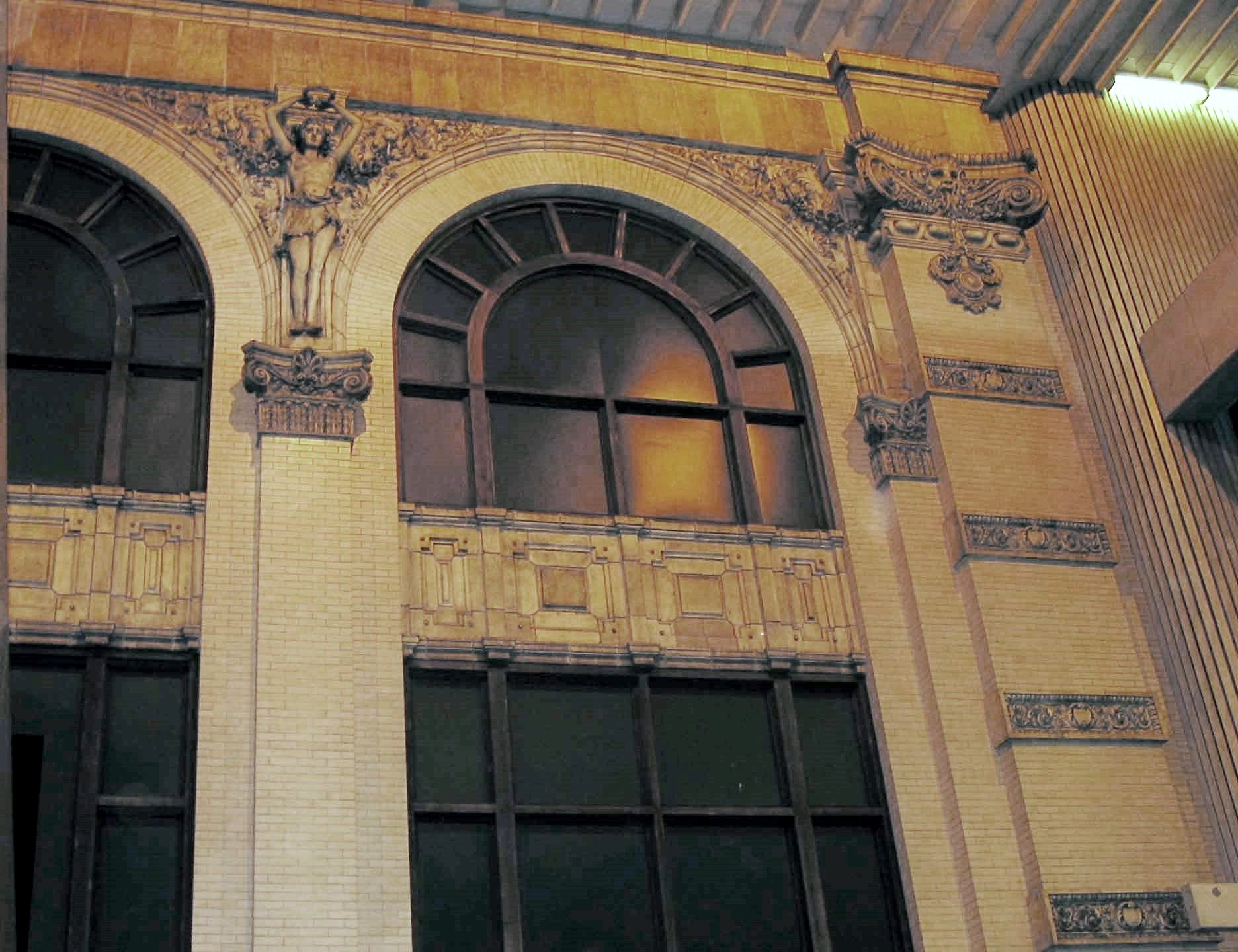
Facade of the Eiseman Building in the Five Points station

The station is composed of three levels, and an additional plaza level. At the surface is the plaza level, which provides access to the concourse level, Alabama Street, and shopping along a pedestrian only portion of Broad Street. The plaza level also houses the MARTA police precinct. The plaza level connects to the concourse level, which has the faregates and provides access to the rail platforms. Outside the paid area are the MARTA Ride Store, Reduced Fare Office, and Lost and Found, and a Zip car address. Outside the faregates are stairs to Peachtree Street, Alabama Street, and Forsyth Street.

Within the faregates are restrooms, an information kiosk, and stairs to the platforms. Directly underneath the concourse level are the Blue Line and Green Line platforms. Running underneath and perpendicular to the Blue/Green platforms are the Red Line and Gold Line platforms. At the end of the platform is the original facade of the Eiseman Building, which was demolished to make way for the station; however, the facade is more visible from some of the platforms. Elevators provide disabled access to all levels of the station. This is the busiest station in the MARTA system, handling an average of 57,000 people per business day, and over 27,000 on weekends.

== Attractions ==
- Station Soccer
- Atlanta City Hall
- Fulton County Annex
- Richard B. Russell Federal Building
- Five Points (Atlanta)
- Sam Nunn Atlanta Federal Center
- Underground Atlanta

== Bus service ==
Five Points station is served by the following MARTA bus routes:

- Route 3 - Martin Luther King Jr. Drive / Auburn Avenue
- Route 21 - Memorial Drive
- Route 40 - Peachtree Street / Downtown
- Route 49 - McDonough Boulevard
- Route 55 - Jonesboro Road
- Route 107 - Glenwood
- Route 186 - Rainbow Drive / South DeKalb
- Route 813 - Atlanta Student Movement Blvd.

The station is also served by CobbLinc and Ride Gwinnett commuter buses.
