= Georgia State station =

MARTA rail station

E1 Georgia State
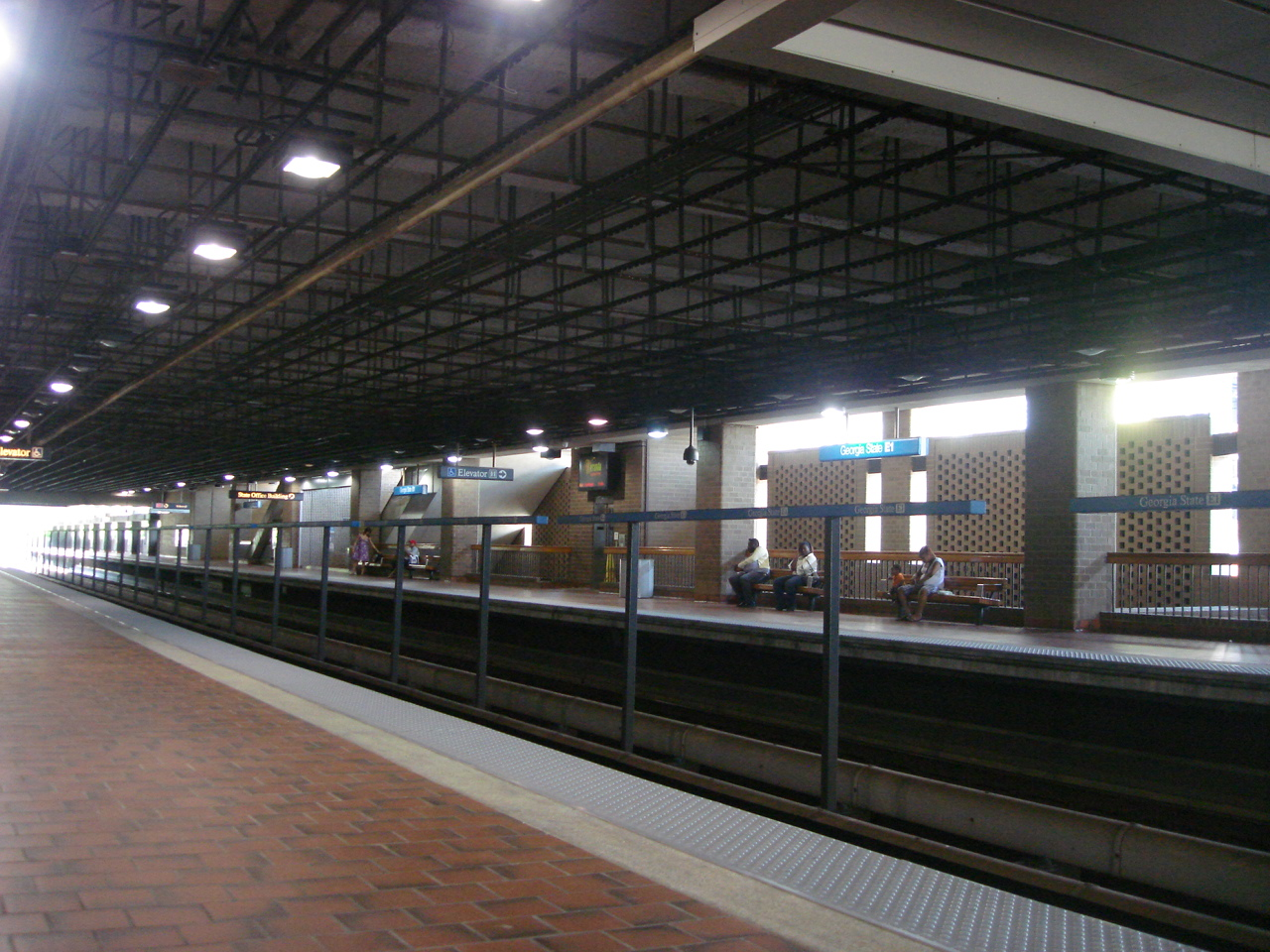
- Georgia State Station

General information
- Location: 170 Piedmont Avenue SE; Atlanta, Georgia 30303; United States
- Coordinates: 33.750539°N 84.386464°W
- Platforms: 2 side platforms
- Tracks: 2
- Connections: MARTA Bus: 107, 813, 899

Construction
- Structure type: Elevated
- Parking: None
- Cycle facilities: 1 bike rack
- Accessible: YES

Other information
- Station code: E1

History
- Opened: June 30, 1979; 47 years ago

Passengers
- 2013: 4,055 (avg. weekday) ▼2%

Services
| Preceding station | MARTA | Following station |
|---|---|---|
| Five Points toward Hamilton E. Holmes | Blue Line | King Memorial toward Indian Creek |
| Five Points toward Bankhead | Green Line Weekend Service | King Memorial Terminus |
| Five Points toward Bankhead | Green Line | King Memorial toward Edgewood/Candler Park |
Location

Georgia State is a subway station in Atlanta, Georgia, serving the Blue and Green lines of the Metropolitan Atlanta Rapid Transit Authority (MARTA) rail system. The station is located within the James H. Floyd State Office Building in Downtown Atlanta and was constructed concurrently with the building in the late 1970s. Exits are located on Piedmont Avenue and Jesse Hill Jr. Drive (formerly Butler Street). The station's name is in reference to its proximity to Georgia State University.

The station provides access to Georgia State University and the Georgia State Capitol. Access is also provided to Grady Memorial Hospital, Children's Healthcare of Atlanta Hughes Spaulding, The Fulton County Health System, the Georgia Archives, James H. Floyd Twin Towers State buildings and Center Parc Stadium. Bus service is provided at this station to Lakewood Stadium, Piedmont Park, and Atlanta Medical Center.

== Station layout ==
| 2F; Platform level | Side platform, doors will open on the right |
| 2F; Platform level | Westbound | ← Green Line toward Bankhead (Five Points) ← Blue Line toward Hamilton E. Holmes (Five Points) |
| 2F; Platform level | Eastbound | Green Line weekday service toward Edgewood / Candler Park (King Memorial)→ Green Line weekend service toward King Memorial (Terminus)→ Blue Line toward Indian Creek (King Memorial) → |
| 2F; Platform level | Side platform, doors will open on the right |
| G | Street Level | Exit/Entrance, station house |

== Buses service ==
The station is served by the following MARTA bus routes:

- Route 107 - Glenwood
- Route 813 - Atlanta Student Movement Boulevard
- Route 899 - Old Fourth Ward
