= Decatur station =

MARTA rail station

E6 Decatur
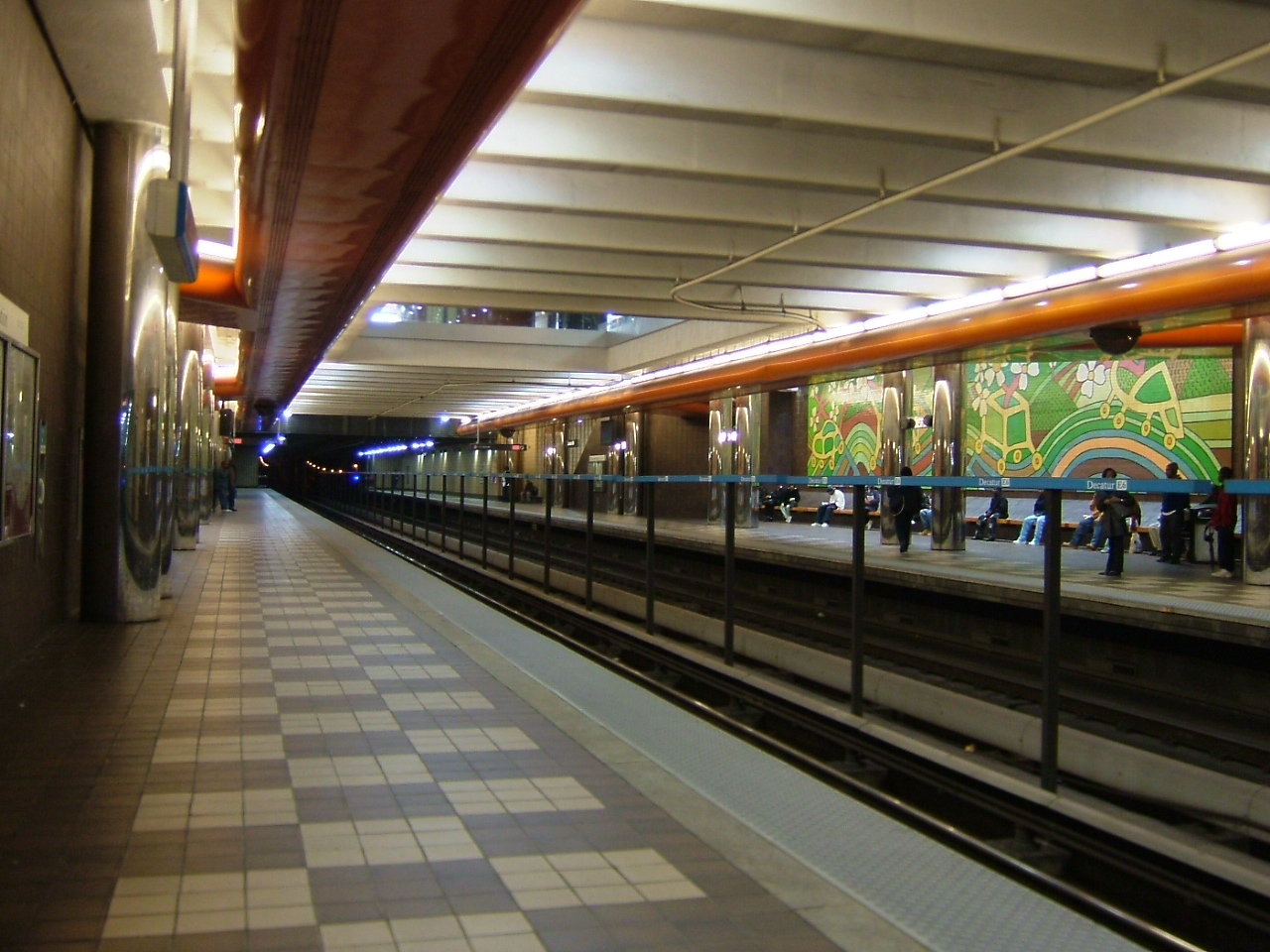
- The platforms at Decatur MARTA Station

General information
- Location: 400 Church Street; Decatur, GA 30030
- Coordinates: 33.774717°N 84.295588°W
- Platforms: 2 side platforms
- Tracks: 2
- Connections: MARTA Bus: 15, 19, 36, 123, 823

Construction
- Structure type: Underground
- Parking: None
- Cycle facilities: 2 spaces
- Accessible: YES
- Architect: Stevens & Wilkinson Architects Engineers Planners Inc.

Other information
- Station code: E6

History
- Opened: June 30, 1979; 47 years ago

Passengers
- 2013: 3,821 (avg. weekday) ▼4%

Services
Preceding station	MARTA	Following station
East Lake toward Hamilton E. Holmes	Blue Line	Avondale toward Indian Creek
Green Line does not stop here
Future Services
Preceding station	MARTA	Following station
East Lake toward Bankhead	Green Line	Avondale Terminus
Location

Decatur station is an underground subway station in Decatur, Georgia, on the Blue Line of the Metropolitan Atlanta Rapid Transit Authority (MARTA) rail system. This station opened on June 30, 1979. In 2005, a major renovation of the Church Street entrance to the station was begun that was completed in 2006. The redesign was intended to allow the station to fit in better with the stores and restaurants in the Decatur square. It has 2 tracks and side platforms that serve each track. It is one of the only stations on the Blue Line (besides those located in downtown Atlanta) that is completely underground.

Decatur mainly serves the City of Decatur and South Dekalb County. It provides access to Downtown Decatur-Historic Shopping and Dining District, Atlanta's Dekalb Conventional Visitor's Bureau, Decatur Main Library, Dekalb County Court House, Decatur City Hall, Devry University, Holiday Inn Plaza Decatur and the Emory-Cliff Shuttle.

Bus service is provided at this station to: South Dekalb Mall, North Dekalb Mall, Agnes Scott College, Georgia State University- Decatur, Emory Hospital-Decatur, North Dekalb Health Center, Decatur Main Post Office, Virginia-Highlands and the Atlanta VA Medical Center.

Green Line service, which currently terminates at Edgewood/Candler Park station, is expected to be extended to Avondale with stops at East Lake and Decatur when the platform at Bankhead is expanded to accommodate 8-car trains. This is being done to increase the levels of service on MARTA's east–west trunk line.

== Station layout ==
G	Street Level	Exit/Entrance
M	Mezzanine	Fare barriers
P Platform level	Side platform, doors will open on the right
P Platform level	Westbound	← Blue Line toward H. E. Holmes (East Lake)
P Platform level	Eastbound	Blue Line toward Indian Creek (Avondale) →
P Platform level	Side platform, doors will open on the right

== Buses at this station ==
The station is served by the following MARTA bus routes:

- Route 15 - Candler Road / South DeKalb
- Route 19 - Clairmont Road
- Route 36 - North Decatur Road / Virginia-Highland
- Route 123 - Church Street / North Dekalb Mall
- Route 823 - Belvedere Plaza / Decatur

== Landmarks and surrounding area ==
- Downtown Decatur
- Devry University
- Emory-Cliff Shuttle
- Agnes Scott College
- Decatur Main Library
- Decatur Historic Courthouse
- Dekalb County Courthuse
