= Tucker-North Dekalb Line =

The Tucker-North Dekalb Line is a partially built spur of MARTA's Blue Line. The Tucker-North Dekalb line was built with the original line from 1975 to 1979. It was constructed between the stations of Edgewood/Candler Park and East Lake but is closer to East Lake Station. The line would have been underground but only 300–400 feet of tunnel were actually built. The original MARTA plans had the Tucker-North Dekalb Line as a busway, which was ruled out in favor of a more efficient rail line. Trains would have run along an existing freight train right-of-way.

The line was abandoned partially because MARTA lacked the money to support it. Secondly, when MARTA did more planning, they found there was heavy opposition to the construction of the line, particularly in the North Druid Hills and Emory area.

There are currently no plans to use the trench and tunnels in the future. The line was originally to run northeast to the area of North Druid Hills, Emory University, and the town of Tucker. In 2001, MARTA wanted to study a line that would have gone south of the Blue Line, and then followed Interstate 20 east. This provision would be where that line would have branched off.
