= Inman Park/Reynoldstown station =

MARTA rail station

E3 Inman Park-Reynoldstown
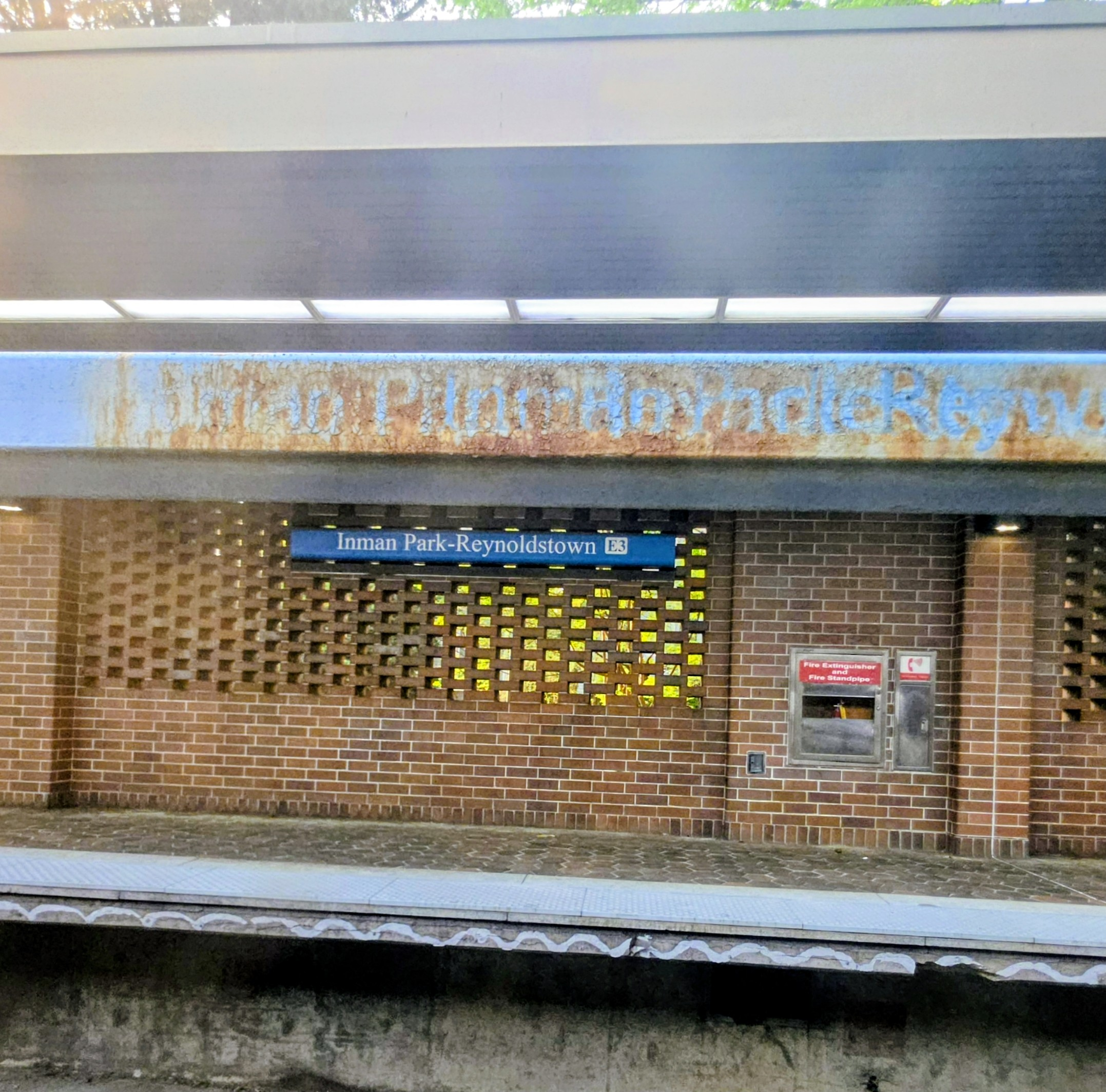
- Inman Park/Reynoldstown

General information
- Location: 1055 DeKalb Avenue NE; Atlanta, GA 30307
- Coordinates: 33.757497°N 84.352797°W
- Platforms: 2 side platforms
- Tracks: 2
- Connections: MARTA Bus: 4, 6, 32, 74

Construction
- Structure type: At-grade
- Parking: 366 spaces; Free daily parking
- Cycle facilities: 36 spaces
- Accessible: YES
- Architect: Prindle, Patrick and Associates

Other information
- Station code: E3

History
- Opened: June 30, 1979; 47 years ago

Passengers
- 2013: 2,525 (avg. weekday) ▼7%

Services
Preceding station	MARTA	Following station
King Memorial toward Hamilton E. Holmes	Blue Line	Edgewood/Candler Park toward Indian Creek
King Memorial toward Bankhead	Green Line Weekday Service	Edgewood/Candler Park Terminus
Location

Inman Park / Reynoldstown is an at-grade subway station in Atlanta, Georgia, serving the Blue Line of the Metropolitan Atlanta Rapid Transit Authority (MARTA) rail system. It also serves the Green Line on weekdays, and has two side platforms and two tracks. This station opened June 30, 1979.

The station primarily serves the communities of Inman Park and Reynoldstown and is located near the Edgewood Retail District. Bus service is provided at this station to Virginia-Highland, Little Five Points, East Atlanta Village, Georgia State University (Decatur), Georgia Department of Labor, Children's Healthcare of Atlanta at Egleston, Centers for Disease Control and Prevention (CDC), Emory University, Michael C. Carlos Museum, MTC and Emory University Hospital. 366 parking spaces are available on site.

== Station layout ==
M	Mezzanine	Crossover between street and platforms
G Ground/ platform level	Side platform, doors will open on the right
G Ground/ platform level	Westbound	← Green Line weekday service toward Bankhead (King Memorial) ← Blue Line toward Hamilton E. Holmes (King Memorial)
G Ground/ platform level	Eastbound	Green Line weekday service toward Edgewood / Candler Park (Terminus) → Blue Line toward Indian Creek (Edgewood / Candler Park) →
G Ground/ platform level	Side platform, doors will open on the right

== Nearby attractions ==
- Edgewood Retail District
- Little Five Points Shopping District
- Communities of Inman Park and Reynoldstown

== Bus service ==
Inman Park-Reynoldstown station is served by the following MARTA bus routes:

=== North Bus Bays ===
- Route 6 – Clifton Road / Emory

=== South Bus Bays ===
- Route 4 – Moreland Avenue
- Route 32 – Bouldercrest
- Route 74 – Flat Shoals Road
