= Sam Nunn Atlanta Federal Center =

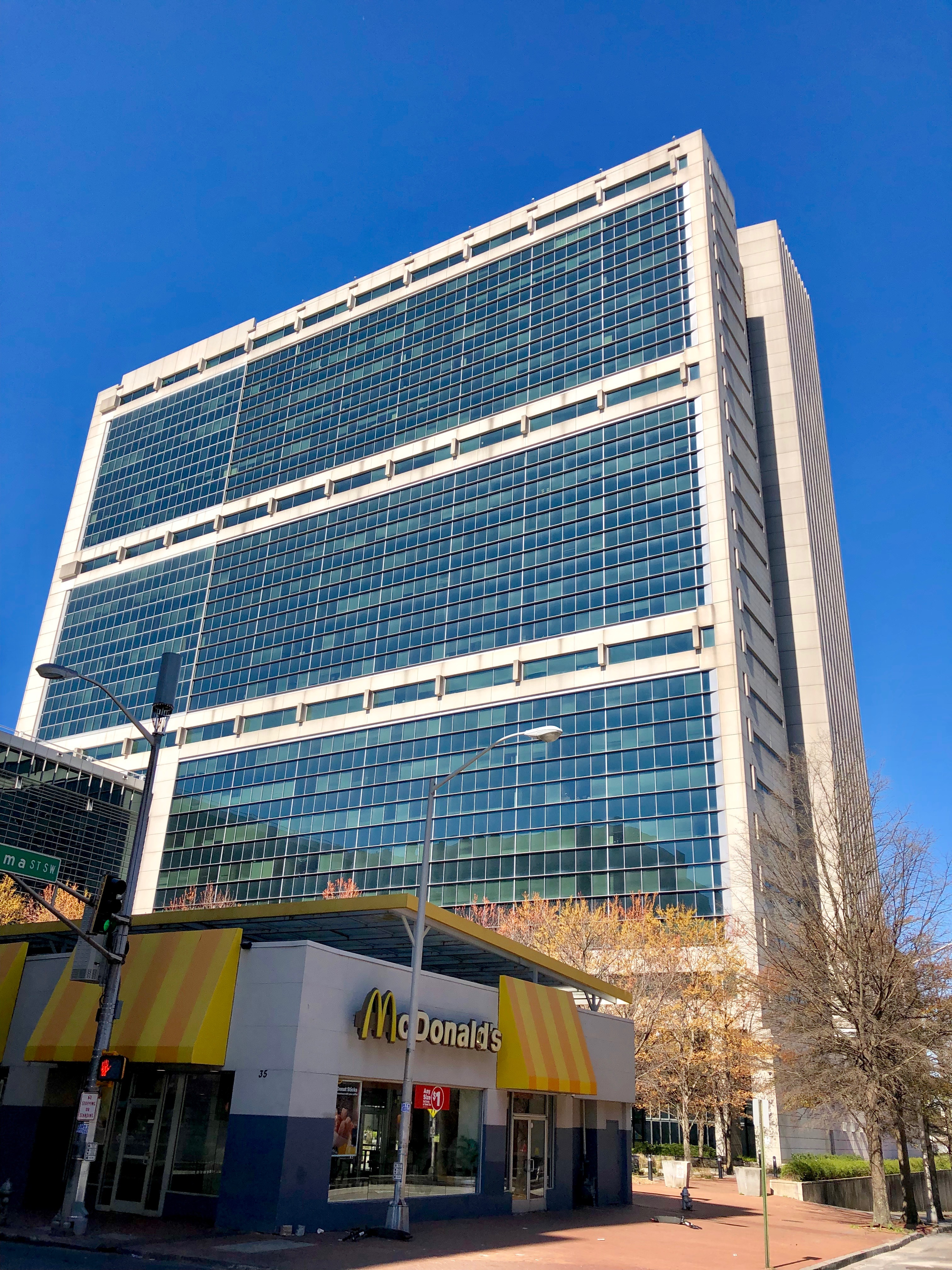
- Interactive map of the Sam Nunn Atlanta Federal Center area

General information
- Status: Completed
- Type: Government office
- Location: 61 Forsyth Street SW, Atlanta, Georgia, United States
- Coordinates: 33.7535°N 84.3930°W
- Completed: 1997
- Owner: Downtown Development Authority of the City of Atlanta (Lessor)
- Operator: U.S. General Services Administration (Lessee)

Height
- Height: 387 ft (118 m)

Technical details
- Floor count: 24 (high-rise section)
- Floor area: 2,400,000 sq ft (220,000 m^{2}) (gross square footage)

Design and construction
- Architect: Kohn Pedersen Fox Associates

The Sam Nunn Atlanta Federal Center is the ninth largest federal building in the United States and the largest in the southeast. The building houses federal employees for dozens of federal agencies and combines four distinct structural elements in central downtown, totaling approximately 2.4 million gross square feet.

The Center is a U-shaped complex consisting of several distinct parts: a 24-story Modernist tower completed in 1997, an 11-story mid-rise section, and the former main building of Rich's department store, which opened in 1924. It also includes an eight-story bridge, six stories above Forsyth Street. The 1948 "Crystal Bridge", which connected two Rich's buildings, was demolished during the converting of the site to the Federal building complex and was replaced by a more substantial connector between the high-rise and the 1924 Rich's building. The architect for the 1996–98 construction was Kohn Pedersen Fox Associates.

A tunnel to and from Five Points station is open to employees, and it was formerly a customer tunnel connecting Rich's to the station.

The building is named for Sam Nunn, U.S. senator from Georgia.
