= Blue Line (MARTA) =

Rapid transit line in the MARTA rail system

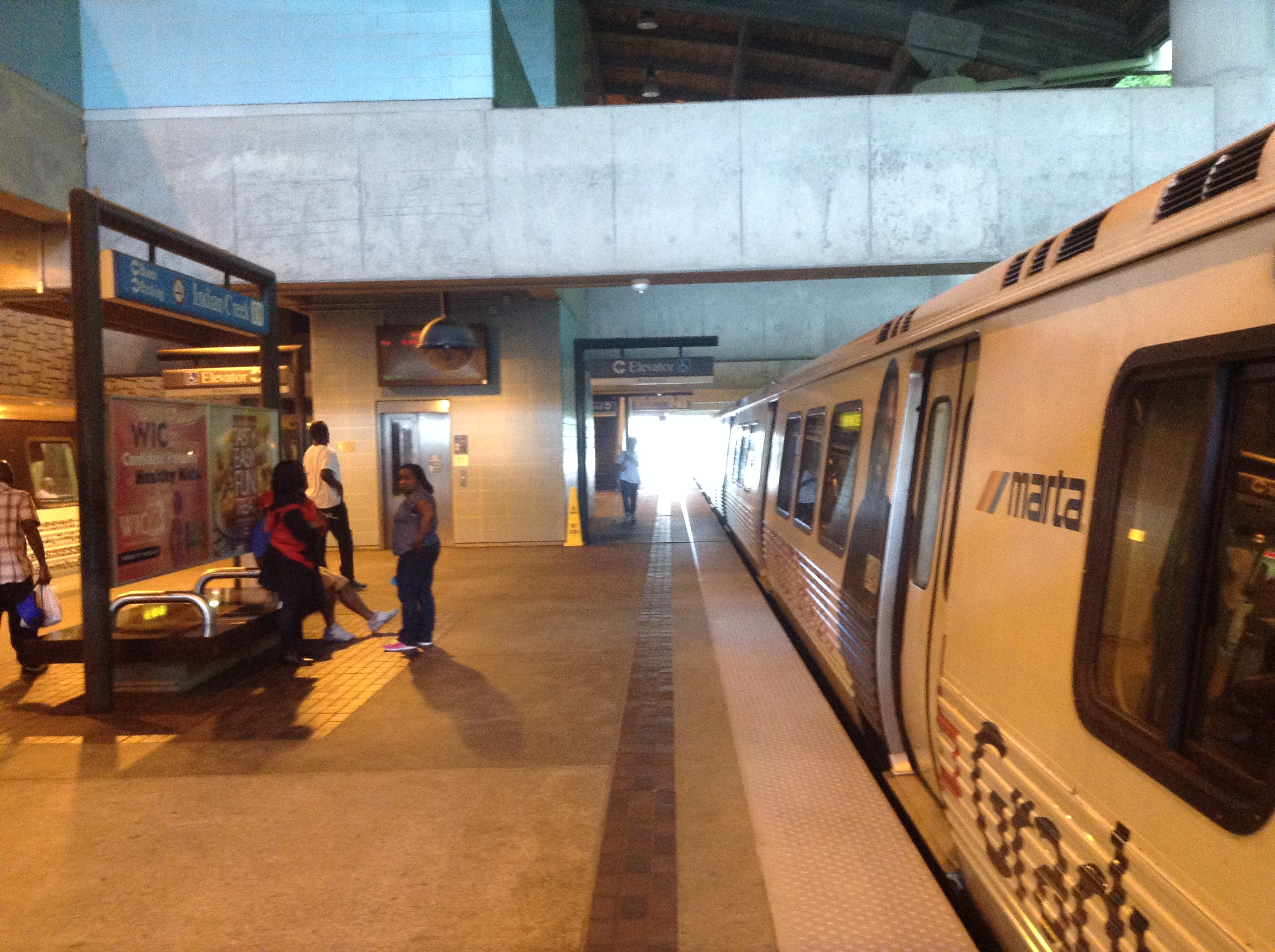
- A Blue Line train stopped at Indian Creek

Overview
- Status: Operational
- Locale: Atlanta, Georgia
- Termini: Hamilton E. Holmes (west); Indian Creek (east)
- Stations: 15 (5 West, Five Points, 9 East)

Service
- Type: Rapid transit
- System: MARTA rail
- Operator(s): MARTA
- Rolling stock: See MARTA rail#Rolling stock

History
- Opened: 1979

Technical
- Character: at grade, elevated, underground
- Track gauge: 4 ft 8 1/2 in (1,435 mm) standard gauge
- Electrification: Third rail, 750 V DC
Route map
Blue Line highlighted in blue
Key

The Blue Line is a rapid transit line in the MARTA rail system. It operates between Hamilton E. Holmes and Indian Creek stations, running through Atlanta, Decatur and portions of unincorporated DeKalb County.

== History ==
What is now called the Blue Line contains some of the first sections of the MARTA rail to open. On February 19, 1975, construction on what was then known as the East Line began. On June 30, 1979, service on the East Line began operating between Avondale and Georgia State. On December 22 the same year, the West Line was opened, between Five Points station and what was then known as Hightower station (now Hamilton E. Holmes station). The combined Hightower-Avondale route became known as the East-West Line.

On December 29, 1992, a branch (then known as the Proctor Creek Line) of the East-West Line to Bankhead station opened. The following year, on June 26, 1993, Kensington and Indian Creek stations on the East Line opened. This was the first time MARTA rail extended beyond Interstate 285.

In 2009, MARTA introduced a color-coded system of naming for its rail lines. As a result, the former East-West Line became the Blue Line.

== Future ==
On March 25, 2024, Andre Dickens, the mayor of Atlanta, announced plans for four new infill stations on the MARTA rail network. On April 11, Dickens announced that one of those stations will be on the Blue Line: namely, Krog Street/Hulsey Yard, located on the Blue/Green Line's shared section.

== Stations ==
listed from west to east

Station	Code	Opened	Rail Line Transfer
Hamilton E. Holmes	W5	December 22, 1979	
West Lake	W4	December 22, 1979	
Ashby	W3	December 22, 1979	Green
Vine City	W2	December 22, 1979	Green
GWCC/CNN Center	W1	December 22, 1979	Green
Five Points (Note: The platforms for what is now the Red and Gold Lines opened in 1981, two years after the East-West Line platforms.)		December 22, 1979	Green Red Gold
Georgia State	E1	June 30, 1979	Green
King Memorial	E2	June 30, 1979	Green
Inman Park/Reynoldstown	E3	June 30, 1979	Green (Note: The Green Line only operates here on weekdays.)
Edgewood/Candler Park	E4	June 30, 1979	Green
East Lake	E5	June 30, 1979	
Decatur	E6	June 30, 1979	
Avondale	E7	June 30, 1979	
Kensington	E8	June 26, 1993	
Indian Creek	E9	June 26, 1993	
