= Green Line (MARTA) =

Rapid transit line in Metro Atlanta, Georgia

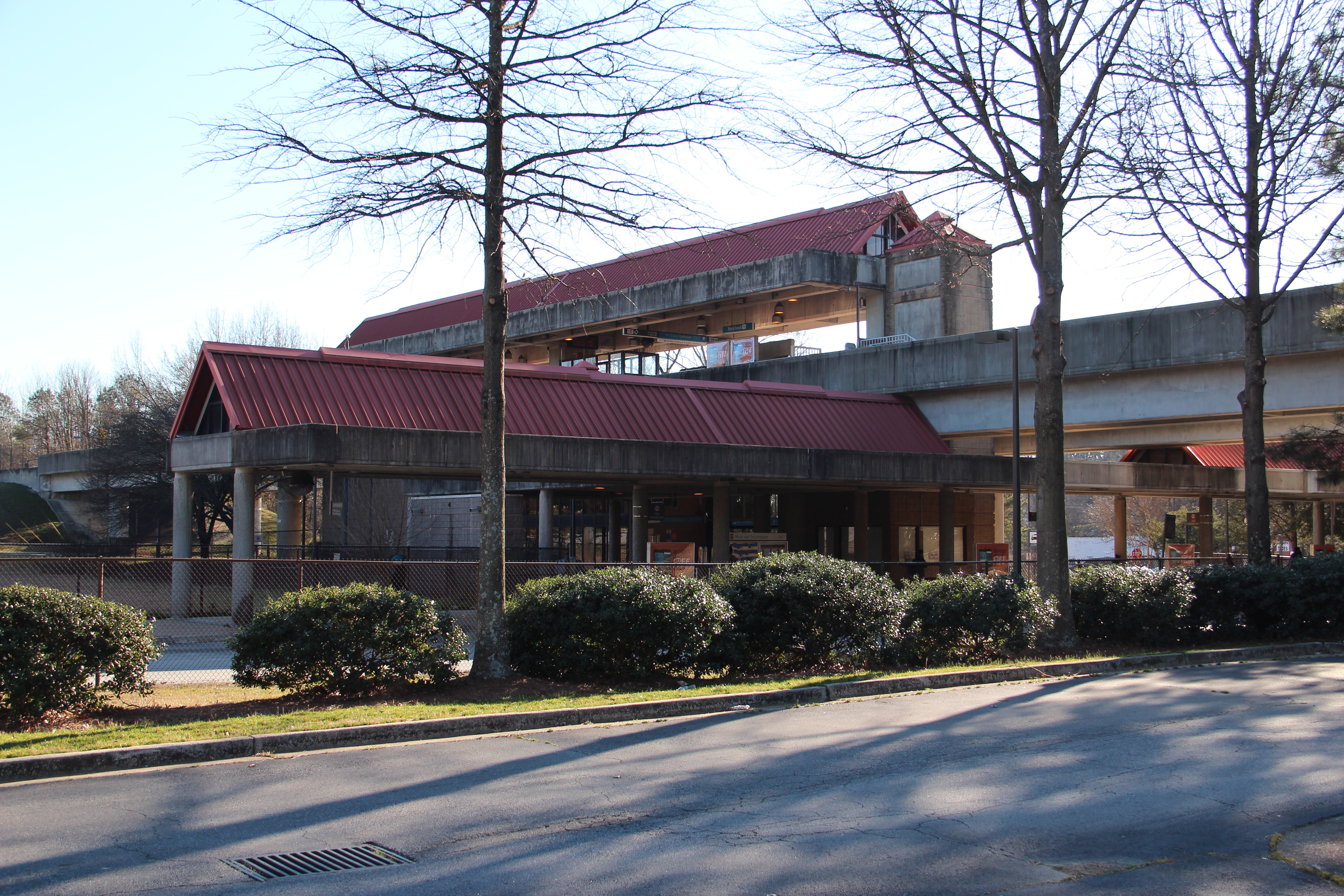
- Bankhead station, the western terminus

Overview
- Status: Operational
- Locale: Atlanta, Georgia
- Termini: Bankhead; Vine City (nights) King Memorial (weekends) Edgewood/Candler Park (weekdays)
- Stations: 9

Service
- Type: Rapid transit
- System: MARTA rail
- Operator(s): MARTA
- Rolling stock: See MARTA rail#Rolling stock

History
- Opened: December 29, 1992

Technical
- Character: at grade, elevated, underground
- Track gauge: 4 ft 8 1/2 in (1,435 mm) standard gauge
- Electrification: Third rail, 750 V DC
Route map
Green Line highlighted in green
Key

The Green Line is a rapid transit line in the MARTA rail system. It operates between Bankhead and Edgewood/Candler Park stations, running exclusively inside the Atlanta city limits. Weekend service operates only as far as King Memorial station, while nighttime service operates as a shuttle to Vine City station.

== History ==
The Green Line is a stub of the originally planned North Line, which would have served points north beyond Bankhead such as Northside Drive in Brookwood Hills, serving the Perry Homes projects along the way. But the line was only ever built as far as Bankhead.

Portions of what is now the Blue and Green Lines were opened between June 30 (Avondale-Georgia State) and December 22, 1979 (Five Points-Ashby), and are the first sections of the MARTA rail system to open. However, it wasn't until December 29, 1992 that the branch to Bankhead, then known as the Proctor Creek Line, opened. The Proctor Creek Line was originally grouped together with the rest of the East-West Rail Line, with both lines being labeled blue on maps. After December 2006, however, the Proctor Creek Line began to be colored green on maps, distinguishing it from the rest of the East-West Rail Line. Later, in 2009, MARTA introduced a color-coded system of naming for its rail lines, leading to the Proctor Creek Line being officially renamed to the Green Line.

== Future ==
On March 25, 2024, Andre Dickens, the mayor of Atlanta, announced plans for four new infill stations on the MARTA rail network. On April 11, Dickens announced that two of those stations will be on the Green Line: namely, Joseph E. Boone (located between Bankhead and Ashby) and Krog Street/Hulsey Yard, located on the Blue/Green Line's shared section.

Additionally, as of 2021, there are plans to extend the platforms at Bankhead station, the line's western terminus, to accommodate eight-car trains. When that happens, Green Line service will be extended eastward to Avondale, with stops at East Lake and Decatur. A limited number of weekday Green Line trains do serve Avondale, though East Lake and Decatur are currently exclusively served by Blue Line trains.

== Operations ==
The Green Line shares trackage with its counterpart, the Blue Line, between just west of Ashby and Edgewood/Candler Park. Green Line rush-hour trains start at Avondale and pass Decatur and East Lake without stopping before pulling onto a pocket track just east of Edgewood/Candler Park.

The Green Line service operates between Bankhead and Edgewood/Candler Park stations all day until 9:00 p.m. on weekdays only. On Saturday, Sunday & holidays, the Green Line operates between Bankhead and King Memorial stations all day until 9:00 p.m.

After 9:00 p.m., the Green Line service operates between Bankhead and Vine City stations only until the end of the service.

== Route ==
The Green Line runs above ground, at-grade and below ground in various portions of its route. It begins at the western terminus of Bankhead station, paralleling Proctor Creek through West Atlanta. (This is the only portion of the Green Line not to share trackage with any other route, albeit a short distance.) It is joined by the Blue Line before Ashby station. The Green Line enters downtown Atlanta, where it meets the Red and Gold Lines at Five Points station. It continues into East Atlanta, where the Green Line reaches its eastern terminus at Edgewood/Candler Park station, while the Blue Line continues on to Indian Creek station.

=== Stations ===
listed from west to east
● all trains stop
▲ trains stop weekdays only

Station	Code	Opened	Rail Line Transfer	Service pattern	
Station	Code	Opened	Rail Line Transfer	Main Line Regular service	Shuttle 9:00 pm – 1:00 am
Bankhead	P4	December 29, 1992		●	●
Ashby	W3	December 22, 1979	Blue	●	●
Vine City	W2	December 22, 1979	Blue	●	●
GWCC/CNN Center	W1	December 22, 1979	Blue	●	
Five Points (Note: The platforms for what is now the Red and Gold Lines opened in 1981, two years after the East-West Line platforms.)		December 22, 1979	Blue Red Gold	●	
Georgia State	E1	June 30, 1979	Blue	●	
King Memorial	E2	June 30, 1979	Blue	●	
Inman Park/Reynoldstown	E3	June 30, 1979	Blue	▲	
Edgewood/Candler Park	E4	June 30, 1979	Blue	▲	
