= West Lake station (MARTA) =

Metro station in Atlanta, Georgia, US

W4 West Lake
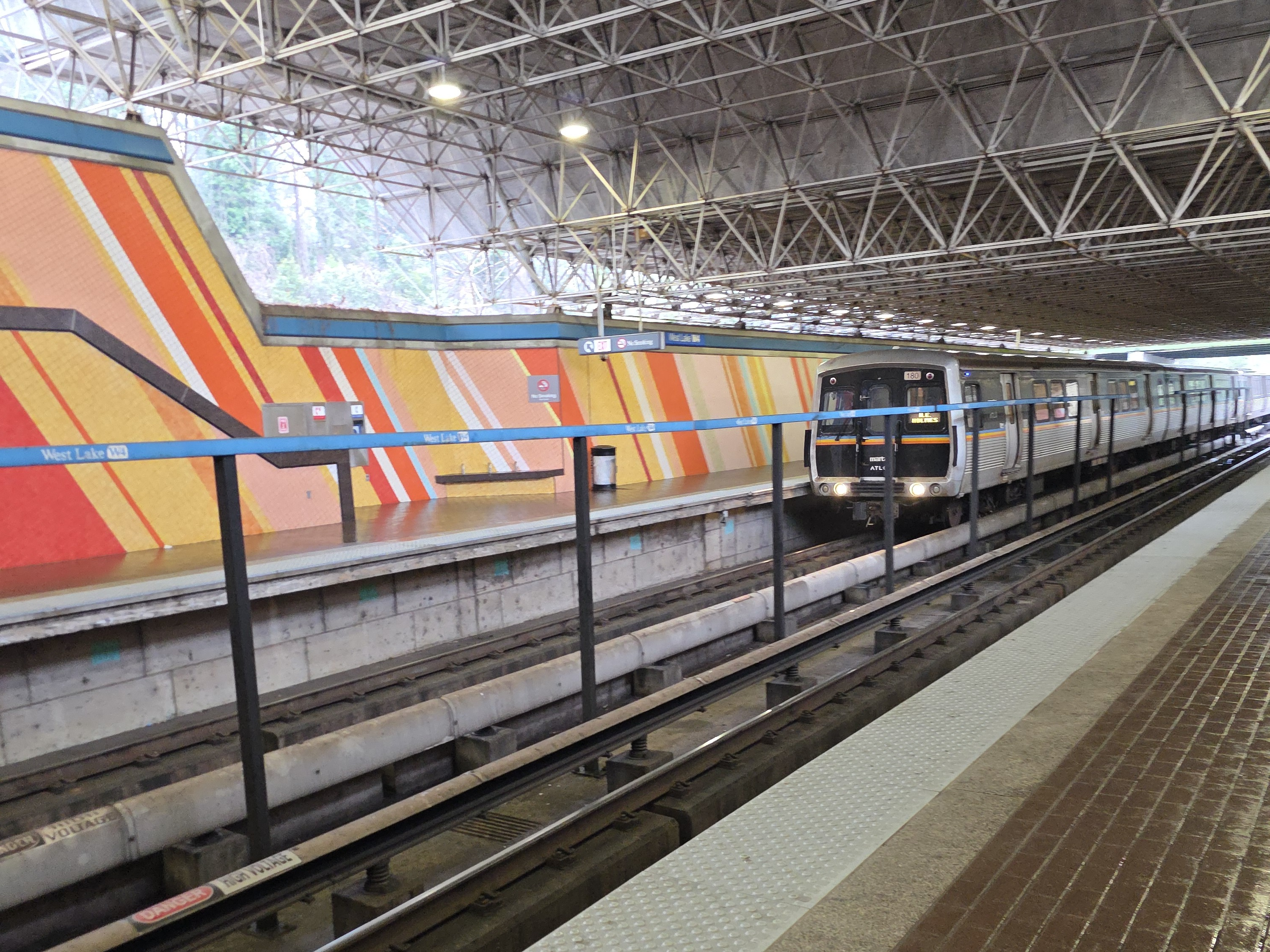
- West Lake station in February 2026

General information
- Location: 80 Anderson Avenue SW; Atlanta, Georgia
- Coordinates: 33.75314°N 84.44658°W
- Platforms: 2 side platforms
- Tracks: 2
- Connections: MARTA Bus: 58, 813, 853, 867

Construction
- Structure type: Open-cut
- Parking: 391 spaces; daily parking
- Cycle facilities: 7 bike racks
- Accessible: Yes

Other information
- Station code: W4

History
- Opened: December 22, 1979

Services
Preceding station	MARTA	Following station
Hamilton E. Holmes Terminus	Blue Line	Ashby toward Indian Creek
Location

West Lake station is a metro station in Atlanta, Georgia, served by the Blue Line of the Metropolitan Atlanta Rapid Transit Authority (MARTA) rail system. The station is located between West Lake Avenue and Anderson Avenue in West Atlanta near the Westview Cemetery.

The station, designed by A.N. Sengupta, has two below-grade side platforms serving the line's two tracks. A steel space frame roof covers the surface-level concourse. The walls of the platform area are covered in 320,000 3-inch (76 mm) colorful porcelain tiles arranged in diagonal stripes by Joseph Perrin. West Lake opened along with the West Line on December 22, 1979.
