= Maddox Park =

Coordinates: 33.771°N 84.427°W

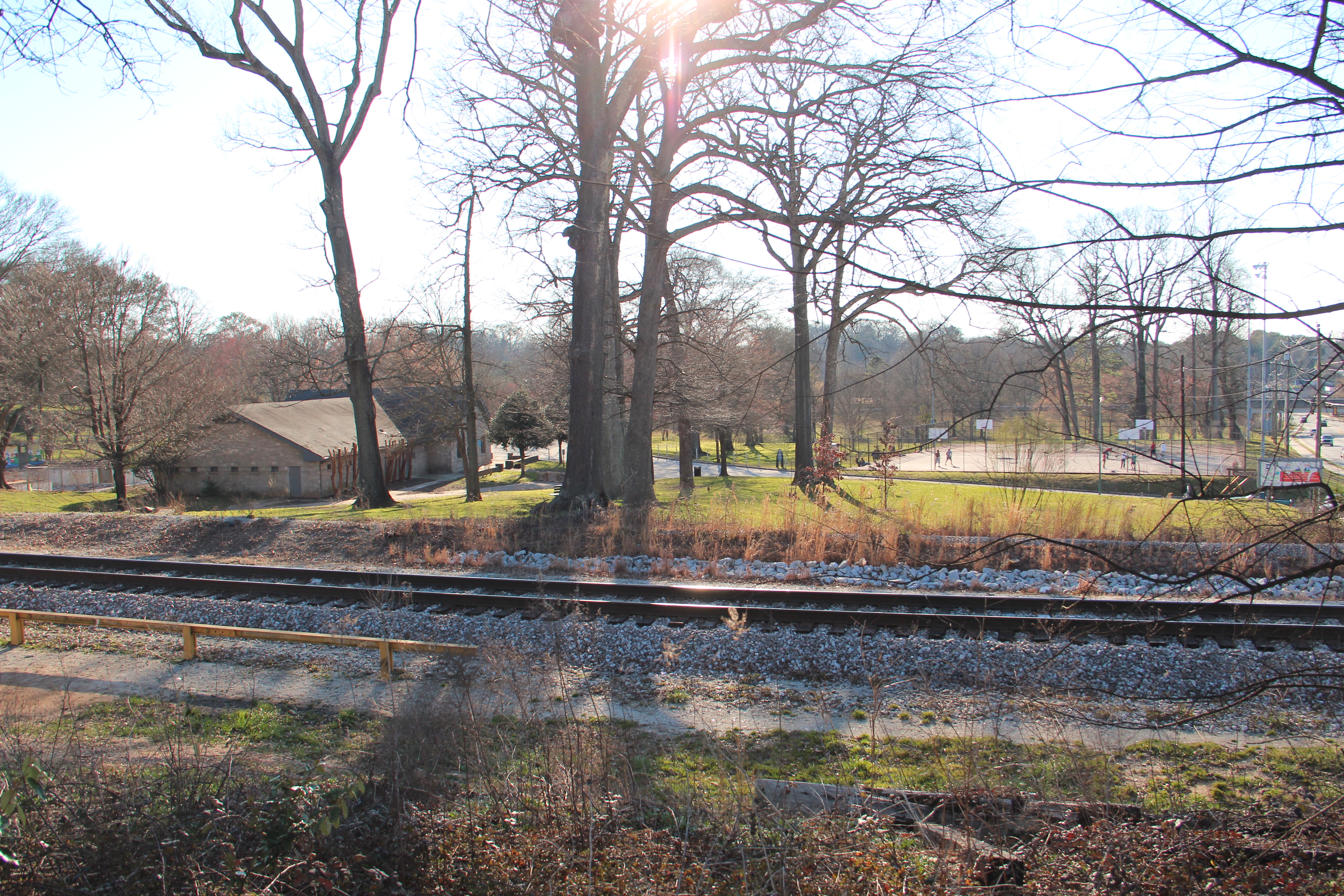
Maddox Park

Maddox Park is a 51-acre (210,000 m^{2}) community park located in the west side of Atlanta (in the Bankhead neighborhood), across Donald Lee Hollowell Parkway from Bankhead MARTA station. It is approximately 1.5 miles (2.4 km) west of Georgia Tech. The park has an existing rail line running through it, which is part of a route on the Beltline. The park is named in honor of former Atlanta mayor Robert Maddox and opened in 1931.

The park is connected to the Beltline and a series of parks encircling the city.
