= East Lake station =

MARTA rail station

E5 East Lake
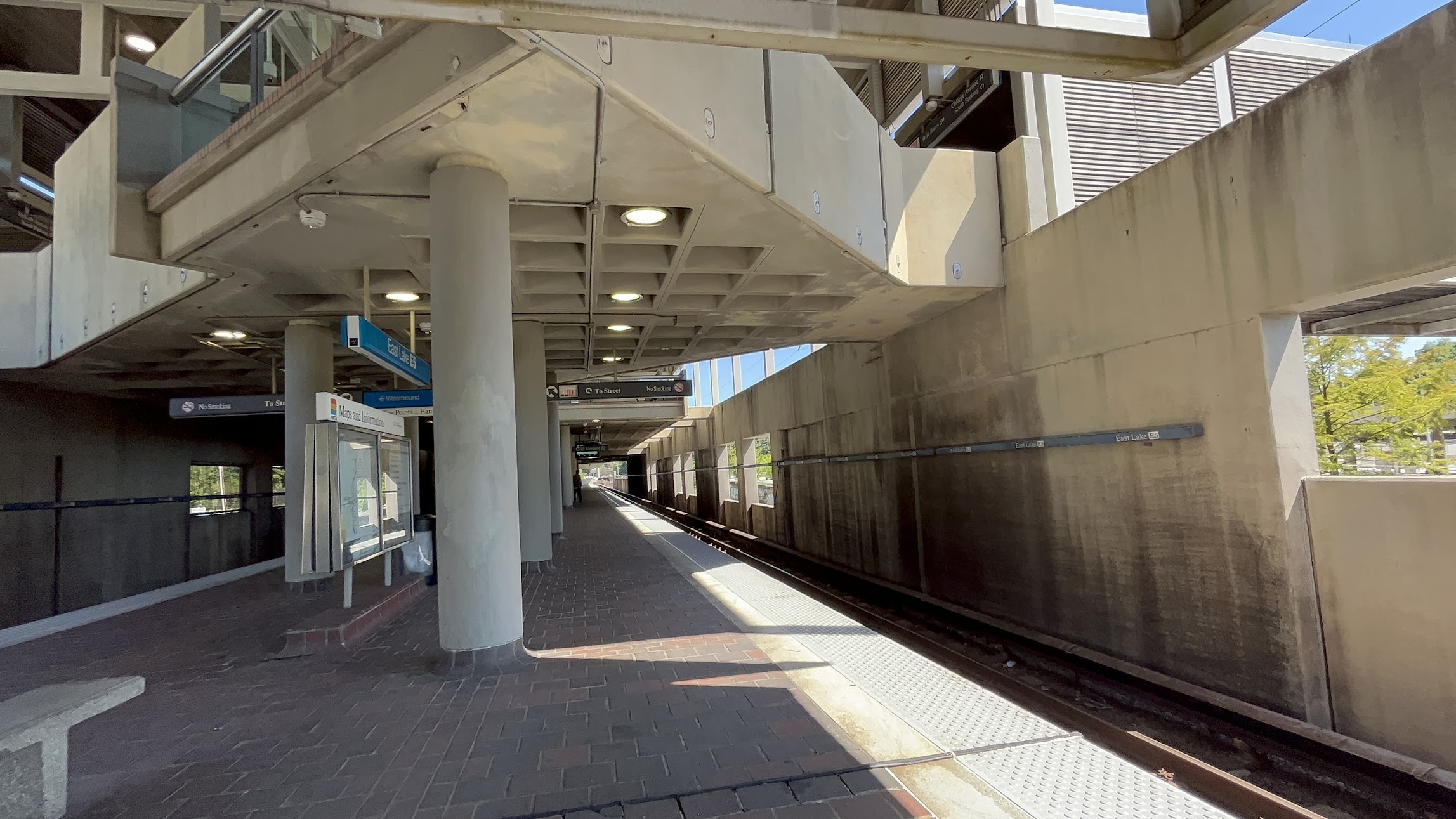
- East Lake MARTA Station platform facing east

General information
- Location: 2260 College Avenue; Atlanta, GA 30307
- Coordinates: 33.765166°N 84.312665°W
- Platforms: 1 island platform
- Tracks: 2
- Connections: MARTA Bus: 34

Construction
- Structure type: At-grade
- Parking: 611 spaces
- Cycle facilities: 18 spaces
- Accessible: YES

Other information
- Station code: E5

History
- Opened: June 30, 1979; 47 years ago

Passengers
- 2013: 1,241 (avg. weekday) ▼8%

Services
Preceding station	MARTA	Following station
Edgewood/Candler Park toward Hamilton E. Holmes	Blue Line	Decatur toward Indian Creek
Green Line does not stop here
Future Services
Preceding station	MARTA	Following station
Edgewood/Candler Park toward Bankhead	Green Line	Decatur toward Avondale
Location

East Lake is an at-grade subway station in Atlanta and Decatur, Georgia, serving the Blue Line of the Metropolitan Atlanta Rapid Transit Authority (MARTA) rail system. It has a track in each direction serving an island platform. When the station entered service on June 30, 1979, the opening ceremony took place in the south parking lot.

This station is located mainly in the neighborhood of Kirkwood, but is named after East Lake Boulevard in neighboring Decatur, into which the east end of the station extends. The station also serves the Villages of East Lake and Oakhurst. There are two Zip car parking spaces in the north parking lot.

Connecting bus service is operated from the station to: The Village of East Lake, East Lake Golf Course, Clifton Springs Health Center, Georgia State University-Decatur, North Dekalb Mall, Ponce City Market and Kirkwood.

Green Line service, which currently terminates at Edgewood/Candler Park station, is expected to be extended to Avondale with stops at East Lake and Decatur when the platform at Bankhead is expanded to accommodate 8-car trains. This is being done to increase the levels of service on MARTA's east–west trunk line.

== Station layout ==
M	Mezzanine	Crossover between street and platforms
G Ground/ platform level	Westbound	← Blue Line toward H. E. Holmes (Edgewood / Candler Park)
G Ground/ platform level	Island platform, doors will open on the left
G Ground/ platform level	Eastbound	Blue Line toward Indian Creek (Decatur) →

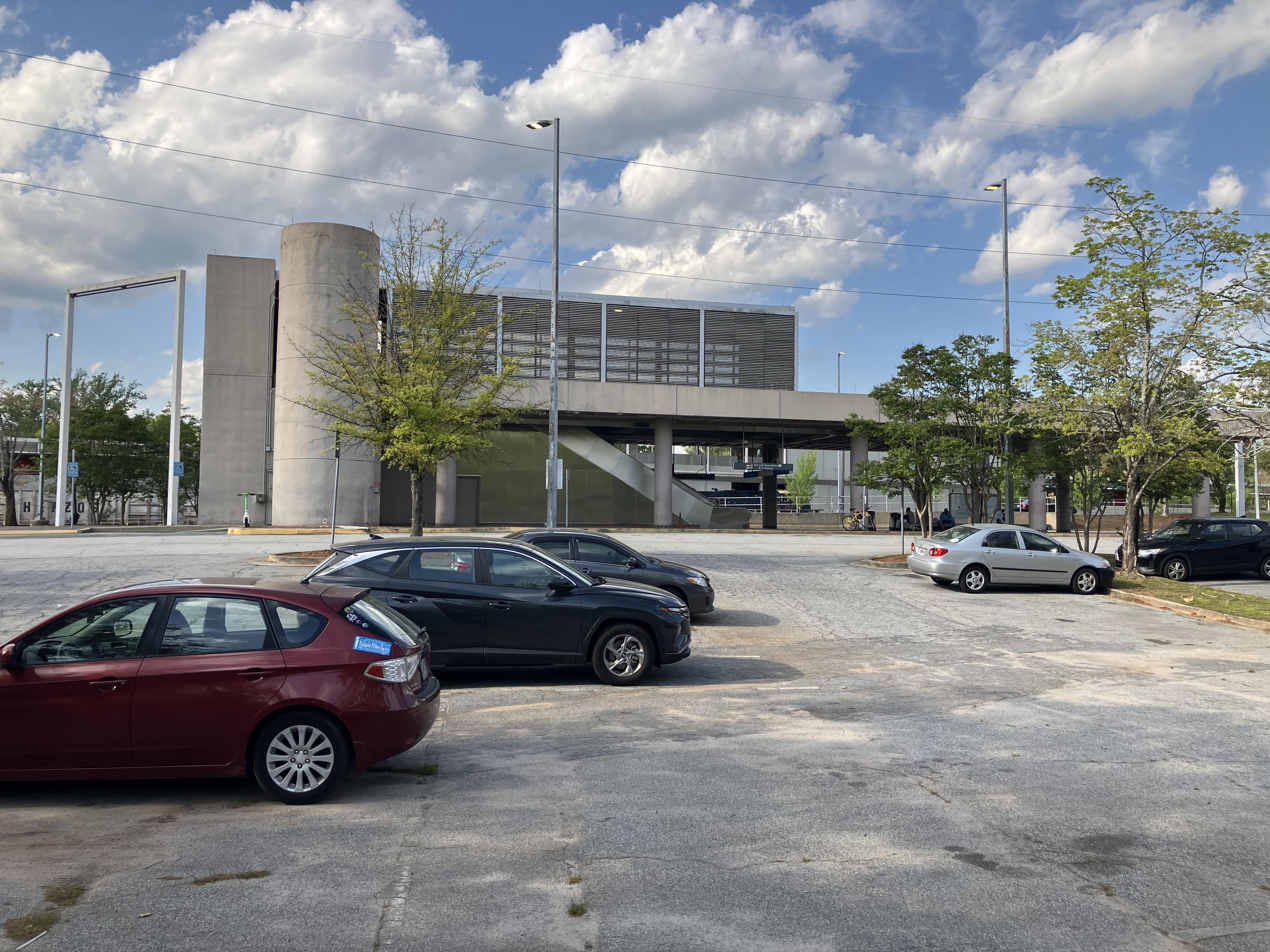
South Entrance (April 2025)

== Buses at this station ==
The station is served by the following MARTA bus routes:

- Route 34 - 2nd Avenue / Gresham Road / Clifton Springs Road

== Nearby landmarks and popular destinations ==
- Oakhurst
- East Lake (Atlanta)
- East Lake Golf Club
