= Richard B. Russell Federal Building =

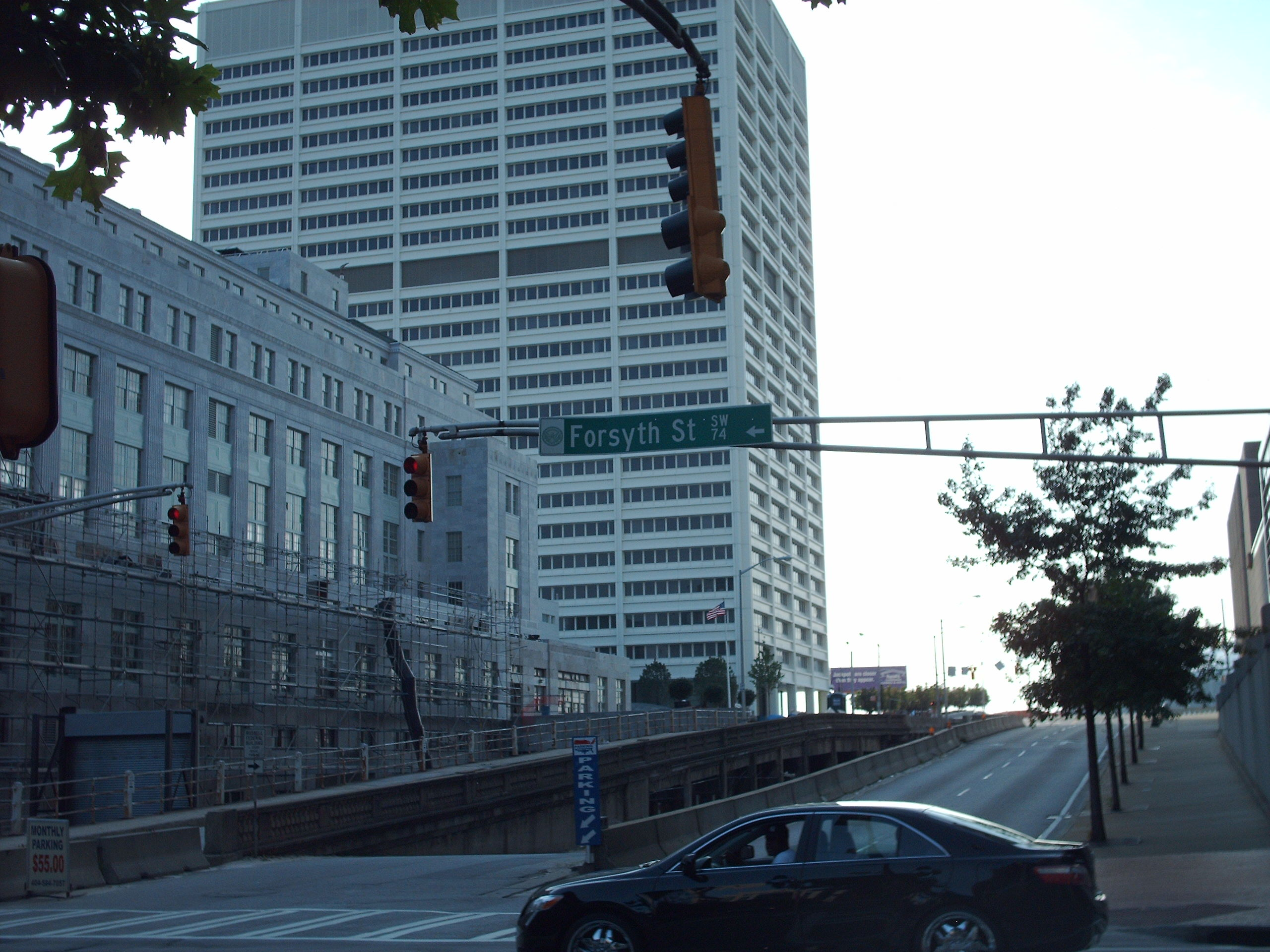
- Interactive map of the Richard B. Russell Federal Building area
- Alternative names: Russell Federal Building

General information
- Type: Government offices
- Location: 75 Ted Turner Drive SW; Atlanta, Georgia
- Coordinates: 33.7532°N 84.3961°W
- Completed: 1978
- Owner: General Services Administration
- Management: General Services Administration

Height
- Roof: 116.74 m (383.0 ft)

Technical details
- Floor count: 26
- Floor area: 1,173,500 sq ft (109,020 m^{2})

Design and construction
- Developer: General Services Administration

The Richard B. Russell Federal Building is a 26-story International style building in Atlanta, Georgia, housing U.S. government agency offices and federal courts.

The building was constructed in 1978, on the site of the former Terminal Station, which was razed in 1972, except for one platform retained by Southern Railway for its use. The building is named after politician Richard Russell Jr., who served as Governor of Georgia from 1931 to 1933 and as a U.S. Senator from 1933 to 1971.
