= King Memorial station =

MARTA rail station

E2 King Memorial
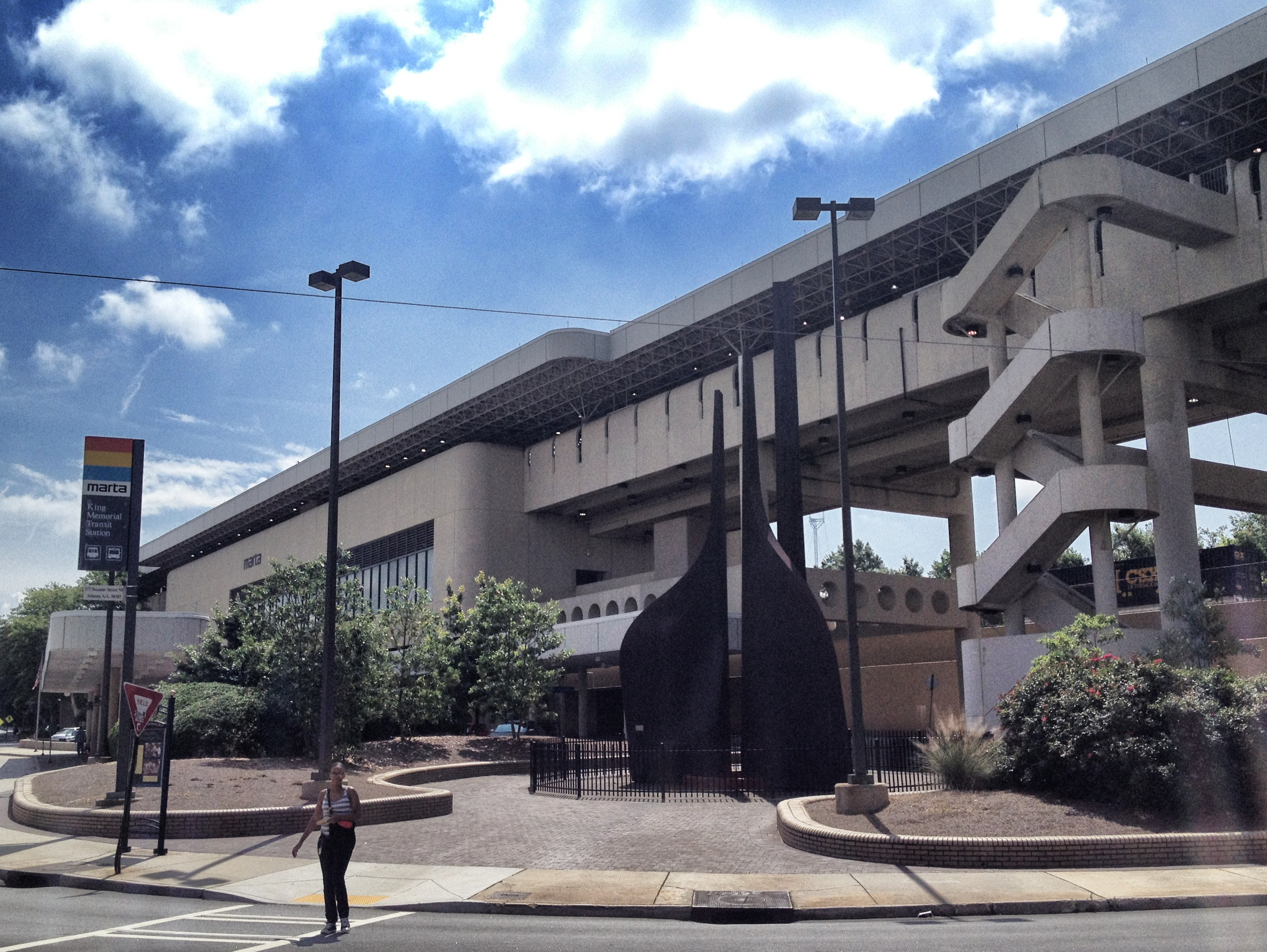

General information
- Location: 377 Decatur Street NE; Atlanta, Georgia 30312
- Coordinates: 33.749959°N 84.37544°W
- Platforms: 2 side platforms
- Tracks: 2
- Connections: MARTA Bus: 3, 7, 10

Construction
- Structure type: Elevated
- Parking: 21 spaces; limited daily parking
- Cycle facilities: None
- Accessible: YES
- Architect: Aeck Associates

Other information
- Station code: E2

History
- Opened: June 30, 1979; 47 years ago

Passengers
- 2013: 1,517 (avg. weekday) ▲8%

Services
Preceding station	MARTA	Following station
Georgia State toward Hamilton E. Holmes	Blue Line	Inman Park/Reynoldstown toward Indian Creek
Georgia State toward Bankhead	Green Line	Inman Park/Reynoldstown toward Edgewood/Candler Park
Georgia State toward Bankhead	Green Line Weekend Service	Terminus
Location

King Memorial is an elevated subway station in Atlanta, Georgia, serving the Blue and Green Lines of the Metropolitan Atlanta Rapid Transit Authority (MARTA) rail system. It is named for Martin Luther King Jr. whose church and burial place are nearby. It mainly serves the Sweet Auburn Historic District as well as the communities surrounding Oakland Cemetery. Bus Service Provided to: Zoo Atlanta, Grant Park, Ansley Mall, Piedmont Park, Atlanta Medical Center, Grady Memorial Hospital, South Dekalb Mall and Ponce City Market.

On weekends, the Green Line terminates at this station rather than continuing to Edgewood/Candler Park station two stops to the east.

== Station layout ==
3F; Platform level	Side platform, doors will open on the right
3F; Platform level	Westbound	← Green Line toward Bankhead (Georgia State) ← Blue Line toward Hamilton E. Holmes (Georgia State)
3F; Platform level	Eastbound	Green Line weekday service toward Edgewood / Candler Park (Inman Park / Reynoldstown) → Green Line weekend termination track → Blue Line toward Indian Creek (Inman Park / Reynoldstown) →
3F; Platform level	Side platform, doors will open on the right
M	-	Mezzanine
G	Street Level	Exit/Entrance

== Buses service ==
The station is served by the following MARTA bus routes:

- Route 3 - Martin Luther King Jr Drive
- Route 7 - Boulevard / McDonough Boulevard
- Route 10 - AUC / Hollywood Rd
