= Bankhead station =

MARTA rail station

P4 Bankhead
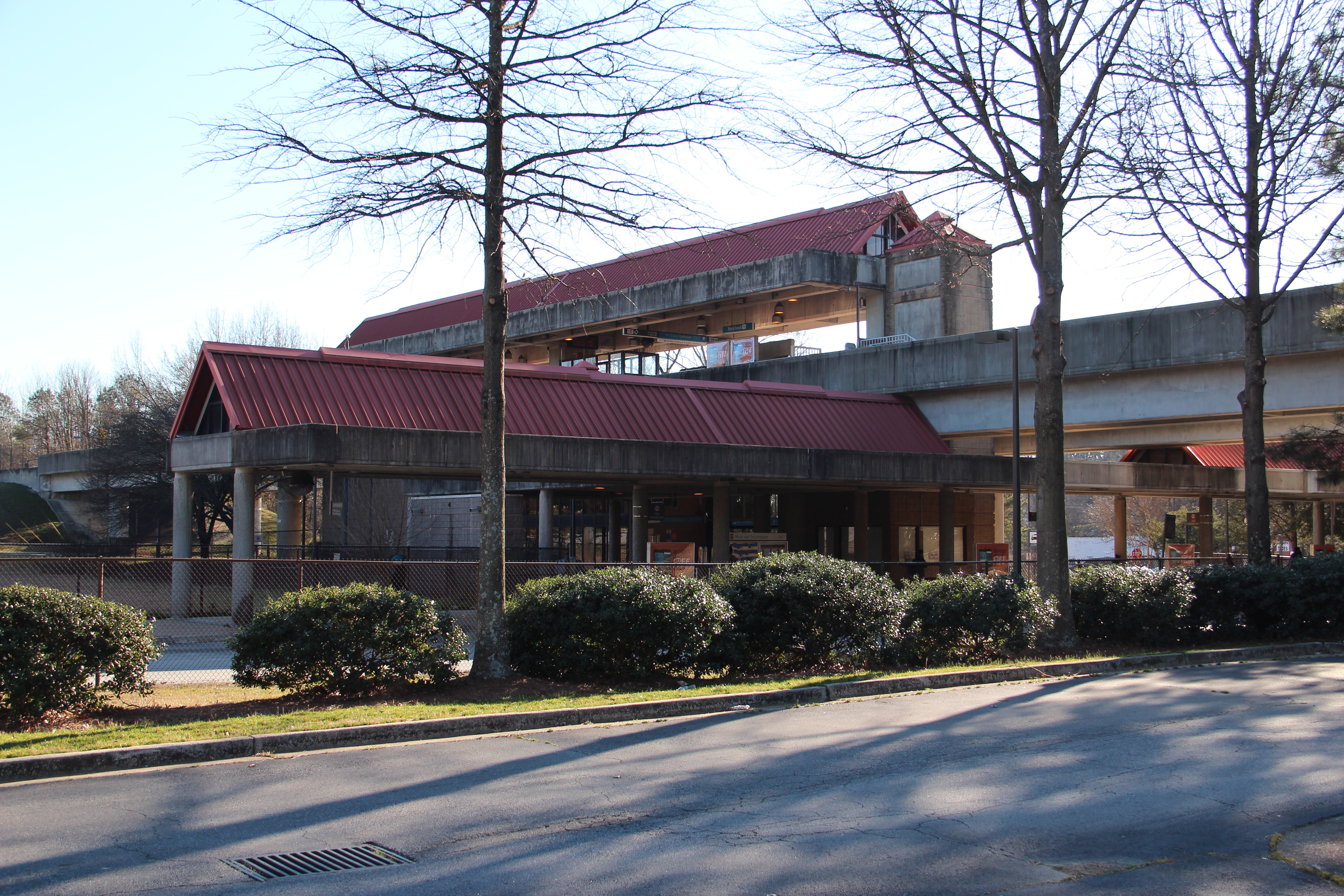

General information
- Location: 1335 Donald Lee Hollowell Parkway NW; Atlanta, GA 30311
- Coordinates: 33.77189°N 84.42884°W
- Owner: MARTA
- Platforms: 1 island platform
- Tracks: 2
- Connections: MARTA Bus: 26, 50

Construction
- Structure type: Elevated
- Parking: 11 free daily parking spaces
- Cycle facilities: None
- Accessible: YES

Other information
- Station code: P4

History
- Opened: December 12, 1992; 33 years ago

Passengers
- 2013: 1,903 (avg. weekday) ▲2%

Services
Preceding station	MARTA	Following station
Terminus	Green Line	Ashby toward King Memorial or Edgewood/Candler Park
Terminus	Green Line Nighttime service	Ashby toward Vine City
Location

Bankhead is an elevated subway station in Atlanta, Georgia, the western terminus of the Green Line in the Metropolitan Atlanta Rapid Transit Authority (MARTA) rail system. Bankhead station is located in the Grove Park Neighborhood due to a recent neighborhood expansion. This station primarily serves the neighborhoods of Grove Park, Bankhead, West Lake, Howell Station, and other Westside residents.

Unlike most MARTA stations, which are provisioned for eight rail cars, Bankhead can only accommodate two cars, with adequate space left in place to allow extension to four cars in the future. It is the only station served exclusively by the Green Line.

The area it serves is scheduled to be an important part of the Beltline, near Maddox Park and the new Shirley Clarke Franklin Park, which would be the largest park in the city of Atlanta.

Bankhead is on a branch from the main east-west trunk and is designated (P4), a legacy of the original Proctor Creek name for the Green Line. This is the only station code not to start with a compass direction.

== Station layout ==
P Platform level	Westbound	← Green Line alighting passengers only
P Platform level	Island platform, doors will open on the left
P Platform level	Eastbound	Green Line toward Edgewood/Candler Park (weekends toward King Memorial, nights toward Vine City) (Ashby) →
G	Street Level	Exit/Entrance, station house

== History ==
Bankhead Station was opened on December 12, 1992, the same day as Doraville. The Green Line is a stub of the originally planned Proctor Creek Line, which was planned to expand north of Bankhead to the Perry Homes community, now called West Highlands.

In addition, there is another stub in between the Edgewood/Candler Park and East Lake stations, which would have been called the Tucker-North Dekalb Line. This included plans for an additional 2 stations, one at Emory University and another in North Druid Hills. The future Green Line would have most likely gone between Bankhead and North Druid Hills stations.

In December 2005, Bankhead station was the first MARTA station to implement Breeze Cards, and there was a controversy when it was discovered that the fare gates ended 15 inches (380 mm) from the ground, which allowed fare evaders to crawl underneath the gates. The issue was fixed by installing plastic bars to the bottom of the gates, reducing the gap to 6 inches (150 mm) and virtually eliminating the possibility of fare evaders crawling through it.

In 2019, MARTA announced a proposal to change the name of Bankhead station to Donald Lee Hollowell Station, reflecting the new name of Bankhead Highway.

== Future ==
Initial plans to expand the Bankhead Station train platform were announced in 2019 as part of the More MARTA program. The proposed expansion would allow the station to accommodate eight-car trains, matching the capacity of MARTA's 37 other rail stations and helping to prepare the station for significant development planned in the surrounding areas. MARTA also announced plans to develop the land around Bankhead Station into a mixed-use development as part of their transit-oriented development (TOD) program. As of October 2025, construction had not begun on either project and the anticipated completion date of the platform expansion had been pushed to 2029.

== Nearby landmarks and popular destinations ==
- Maddox Park
- Shirley Clarke Franklin Park
- Beltline Westside Trail
- King Plow Arts Center
- Fulton County Jail

== Bus routes ==
The station is served by the following MARTA bus routes:

- Route 26 - Marietta Street / Perry Boulevard
- Route 50 - Donald Lee Hollowell Parkway
