= Edgewood/Candler Park station =

MARTA rail station

E4 Edgewood / Candler Park
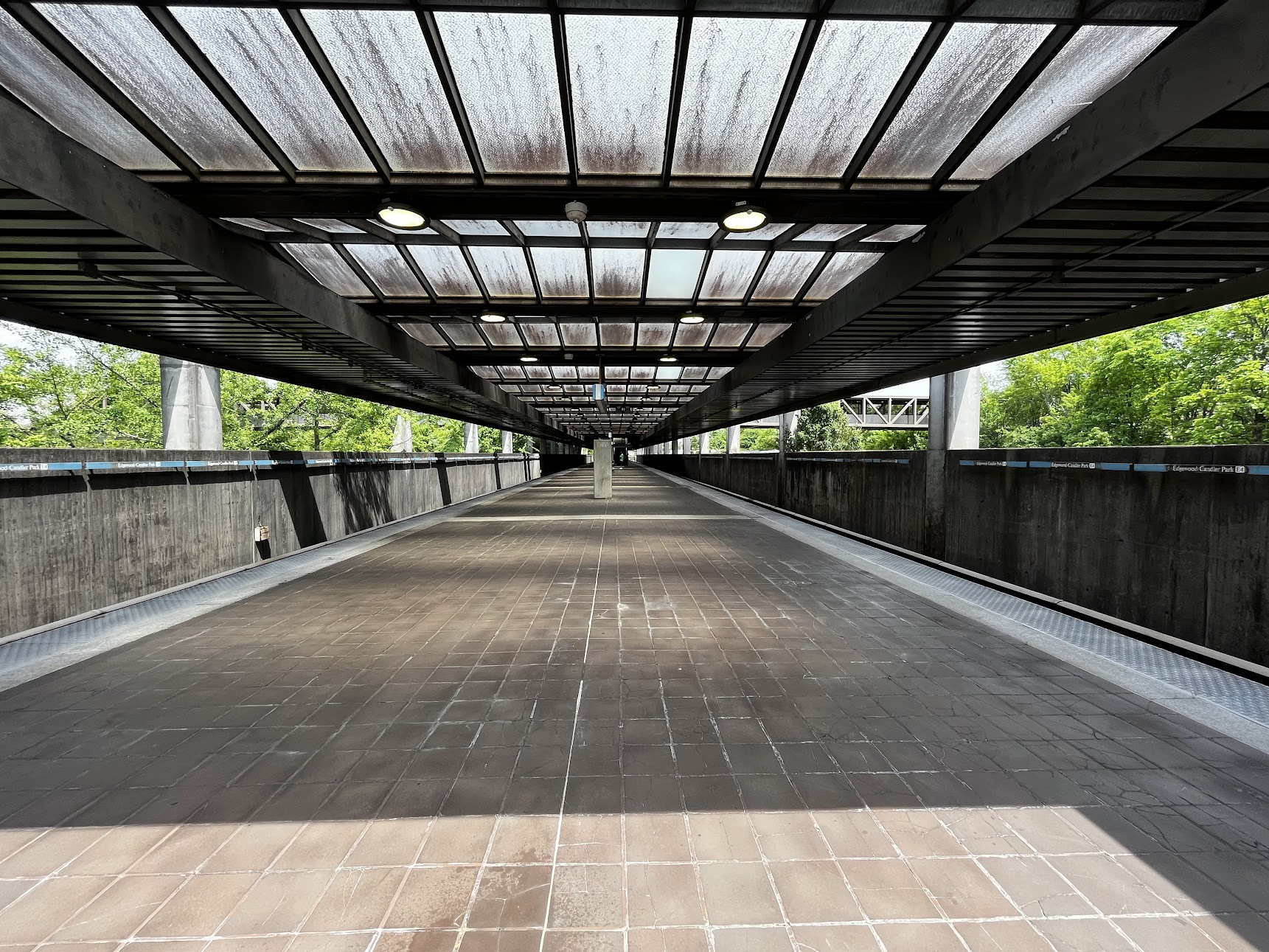
- Edgewood/Candler Park MARTA Station platform facing east

General information
- Location: 1475 DeKalb Avenue NE; Atlanta, GA 30307
- Coordinates: 33.762001°N 84.339579°W
- Platforms: 1 island platform
- Tracks: 2
- Connections: MARTA Bus: 24, 102

Construction
- Structure type: Elevated
- Parking: 679 spaces
- Cycle facilities: 18 spaces
- Accessible: YES
- Architect: Mayes, Sudderth, Etheredge, Connell

Other information
- Station code: E4

History
- Opened: June 30, 1979; 47 years ago

Passengers
- 2013: 1,143 (avg. weekday) ▼3%

Services
| Preceding station | MARTA | Following station |
|---|---|---|
| Inman Park/Reynoldstown toward Hamilton E. Holmes | Blue Line | East Lake toward Indian Creek |
| Inman Park/Reynoldstown toward Bankhead | Green Line Weekdays Only | Terminus |
| Inman Park/Reynoldstown toward Bankhead | Green Line Weekdays Only | Avondale Limited Service Terminus |
Location

Edgewood / Candler Park is an elevated subway station in Atlanta, Georgia, on the Blue Line of the Metropolitan Atlanta Rapid Transit Authority (MARTA) rail system. Currently, the station also serves as the terminus of the Green Line on weekdays. On weekends, Green Line service instead terminates two stops to the west at King Memorial. The station opened on June 30, 1979.

This station was proposed to be the final connecting point between the Eastbound Train (now known as Blue Line) and Proctor Creek Lines (now Green Line) before it shifted toward North Central DeKalb. Two stations for that area were planned: Emory and Druid Hills, respectively, before they were ultimately canceled. An additional station was planned on the Green Line to end at Perry Homes on the Western side, but ultimately, only Bankhead was built. The station was built to handle the separation of the rail lines and to handle people transferring between trains.

It mainly serves the communities of Edgewood, Kirkwood, and Candler Park. Bus service is provided to Villages of East Lake, Edgewood Retail District, Ponce City Market, Little Five Points and Downtown Kirkwood

== Station layout ==
| M | Mezzanine | Crossover between street and platforms |
| P Platform level | Westbound | ← Green Line weekday service toward Bankhead (Inman Park / Reynoldstown) ← Blue Line toward Hamilton E. Holmes (Inman Park / Reynoldstown) |
| P Platform level | Island platform, doors will open on the left |
| P Platform level | Eastbound | Green Line weekday termination track → Green Line limited service toward Avondale (Terminus) → Blue Line toward Indian Creek (East Lake) → |
| G | Street Level | Exit/Entrance |

== Bus routes at this station ==
The station is served by the following MARTA bus routes:

=== South Bus Bays ===
- Route 24 - McAfee / Hosea Williams Drive
- Route 102 - North Avenue / Little Five Points

== Nearby landmarks & destinations ==
- Candler Park neighborhood
- Edgewood neighborhood
