= Indian Creek station =

MARTA rail station

E9 Indian Creek
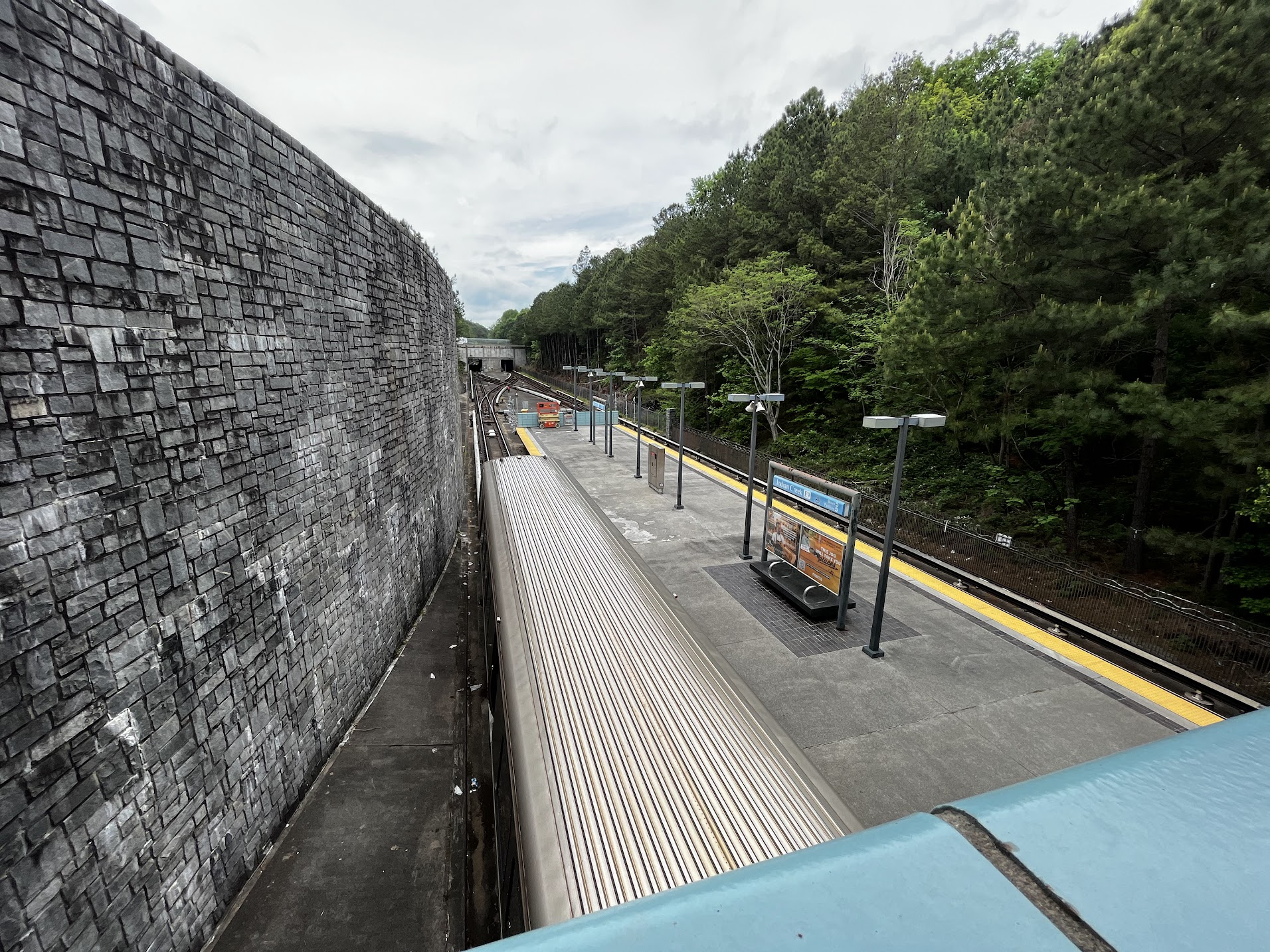
- MARTA Indian Creek station facing westward

General information
- Location: 3901 Durham Park Road; Stone Mountain, GA 30083
- Coordinates: 33.769794°N 84.229656°W
- Platforms: 1 Island platform
- Tracks: 2
- Connections: MARTA Bus: 22, 111, 116, 119; Ride Gwinnett: 70

Construction
- Structure type: At-grade
- Parking: 910 East Lot spaces and 1,440 West Lot spaces
- Cycle facilities: 4 spaces
- Accessible: YES

Other information
- Station code: E9

History
- Opened: June 26, 1993; 33 years ago

Passengers
- 2013: 5,612 (avg. weekday) ▼1%

Services
Preceding station	MARTA	Following station
Kensington toward Hamilton E. Holmes	Blue Line	Terminus
Location

Indian Creek is an at-grade subway station in unincorporated DeKalb County, Georgia, the eastern terminus of the Blue Line of the Metropolitan Atlanta Rapid Transit Authority (MARTA) rail system. It has an island platform with one track on each side of the platform. This station opened in June 1993.

As the eastern terminus for the Blue Line, it primarily serves commuters who take advantage of the free daily parking and ride into the city of Atlanta. Located just outside "The Perimeter" Interstate 285, it mainly serves Lithonia, Stonecrest, Snellville as well as communities in: Stone Mountain, and unincorporated communities in: Redan, Stone Mountain and Decatur. Bus service is provided at this station to: Lithonia, The Mall at Stonecrest, South DeKalb Mall, South DeKalb Transfer Point, Goldsmith Park & Ride, East Dekalb Health Center, East Lake Golf Course, Georgia State University, The Beltline, and Snellville.

== Station layout ==
G	Street Level	Entrance/Exit, station house
P	Westbound	← Blue Line toward H. E. Holmes (Kensington)
P	Island platform, doors will open on the left, right
P	Westbound	← Blue Line toward H. E. Holmes (Kensington)

== Bus Service ==
The station is served by the following MARTA bus routes:

- Route 22 – Glenwood
- Route 111 – South Hairston Road / Wesley Chapel Road
- Route 116 – Redan Road
- Route 119 – Hairston Road

Ride Gwinnett's Route 70 also operates to this station's East Bus Bays, operating along Stone Mountain Highway to downtown Snellville. Service began in late August 2023.
