= Peachtree Hills =

Neighborhood of Atlanta, Georgia

Coordinates: 33.818°N 84.381°W

Peachtree Hills is a neighborhood within the Buckhead district of Atlanta, Georgia. It primarily contains residential buildings, however, commercial buildings are scattered throughout the neighborhood. Peachtree Battle Shopping Center is located within the borders of Peachtree Hills.

== Geography ==
Peachtree Hills' geographical borders are Peachtree Road on the west, Lindbergh Drive on the north, Amtrak/ Norfolk Southern rail lines on the east, and Peachtree Creek on the south. Other neighborhoods that border Peachtree Hills include: Peachtree Battle Alliance, Peachtree Heights West, Peachtree Heights East, Garden Hills, Lindbergh/Morosgo, and Armour.

== History ==
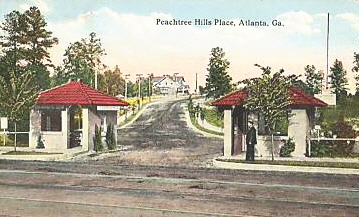
Peachtree Hills Place postcard early 20th century

The Civil War Battle of Peachtree Creek took place very close to present day Peachtree Hills.

Peachtree Hills was subdivided from farmland in 1910. It was originally a streetcar suburb of Atlanta in the early 20th century.

== Transportation ==
Peachtree Hills is in close proximity to Peachtree Road, I-85, I-75, S.R. 400, and the Buford Highway Connector.

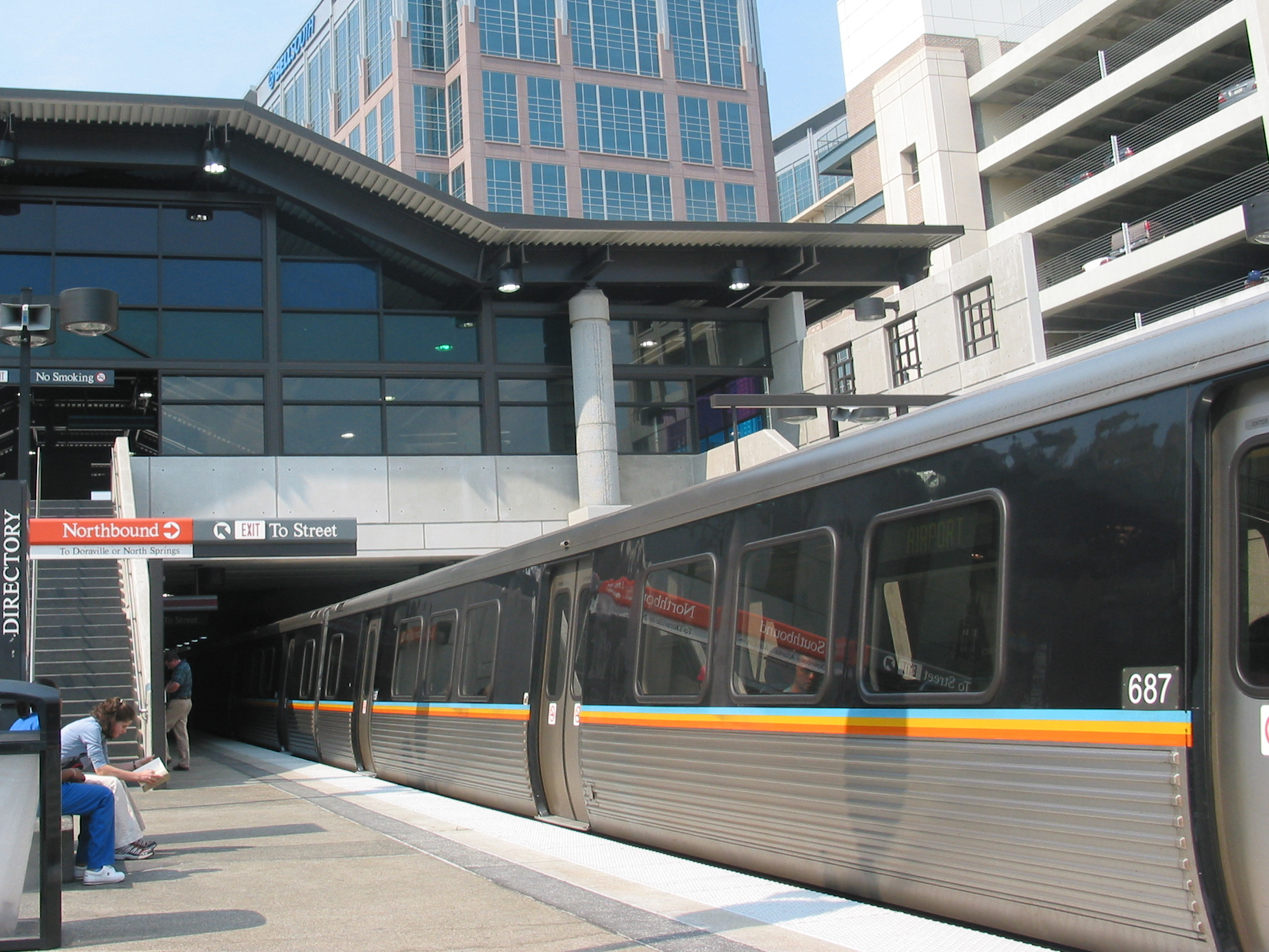
Lindbergh Center station provides access to the Red and Gold MARTA rail lines

Hartsfield–Jackson Atlanta International Airport is approximately 15 miles south of the neighborhood.

Peachtree Hills is within walking distance of the Lindbergh Center station, which provides access to MARTA's Red and Gold rapid transit lines, as well as select bus routes. Lindbergh Center station provides Peachtree Hills residents with direct, convenient, and economical access to the Hartsfield–Jackson Atlanta International Airport through the MARTA Red and Gold rapid transit lines.

Construction on the Clifton Corridor is expected to begin in 2022. The Clifton Corridor will be a boon to residents of Peachtree Hills. Light rail is expected to run from Lindbergh Center station to Avondale station and provide Peachtree Hills residents with convenient access to Emory University and Your DeKalb Farmers Market.

The Atlanta Beltline northside trail will eventually run near Peachtree Hills, bringing light-rail and easier access to Lindbergh Center station and Armour to the south.

== Education ==
Residents of Peachtree Hills live in the Rivers Elementary, Sutton Middle, and North Atlanta High public school districts.

The following private schools are located near Peachtree Hills:

- Christ the King School (K-8)
- Atlanta International School (PK-12)
- Dar Un-Noor School (PK-8)
- Heritage Preparatory School (PK-8)
- Atlanta Montessori International School (PK-9)
- Immaculate Heart of Mary Catholic School (K-8)
- Torah Day School of Atlanta (K-8)
- Yeshiva Ohr Yisrael of Atlanta (9-12)
- The Richard and Jean Katz High School for Girls (9-12)
- Ben Franklin Academy (9-12)

Residents of Peachtree Hills also enjoy close proximity to the many colleges and universities in the Atlanta metropolitan area.
