= Kensington station (MARTA) =

MARTA rail station

E8 Kensington
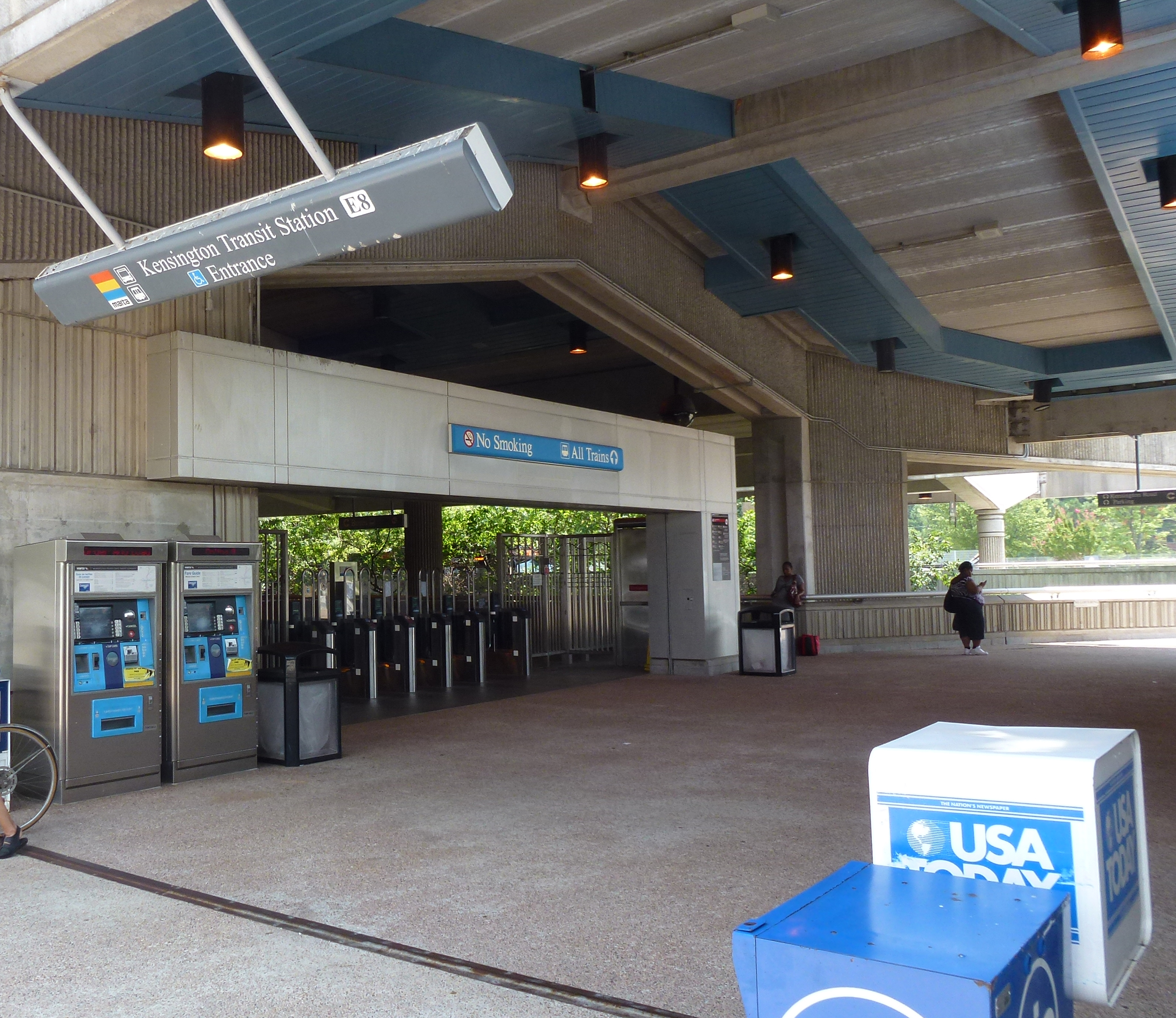

General information
- Location: 3350 Kensington Road; Decatur, GA 30032
- Coordinates: 33.772664°N 84.251937°W
- Platforms: 1 island platform
- Tracks: 2
- Connections: MARTA Bus: 21, 109, 115, 116, 119, 121, 125

Construction
- Structure type: At-grade
- Parking: 1,946 spaces
- Accessible: YES

Other information
- Station code: E8

History
- Opened: June 26, 1993; 33 years ago

Passengers
- 2013: 5,950 (avg. weekday) ▼2%

Services
Preceding station	MARTA	Following station
Avondale toward Hamilton E. Holmes	Blue Line	Indian Creek Terminus
Location

Kensington is an at-grade subway station in unincorporated DeKalb County, Georgia, serving the Blue Line of the Metropolitan Atlanta Rapid Transit Authority (MARTA) rail system. It has one island platform with 1 track on each side. This station opened on June 26, 1993.

Kensington is mainly a park-and-ride train station for commuters heading into Atlanta. This station serves unincorporated communities such as Stone Mountain, Tucker, and Lithonia, as well as the cities of Decatur, Stonecrest and Clarkston.

Bus service at this station to: Dekalb County Sheriffs Headquarters and Jail, Georgia Piedmont Technical College, Georgia State University Clarkston, East Lake Golf Course, Goldsmith Park & Ride, Northlake Mall, South DeKalb Mall, South DeKalb Transfer Point, Embry Village Shopping Center, East DeKalb Health Center, Clarkston, Doraville, Chamblee, Tucker, and The Mall at Stonecrest. Transfers to the Emory Cliff Shuttle's Oxford route are also available.

Bus Rapid Transit is provided at this station to points along Memorial Drive: 221- Memorial Drive Limited.

== Station layout ==
G	Street Level	Entrance/Exit, station house
G Ground/ platform level	Westbound	← Blue Line toward H. E. Holmes (Avondale)
G Ground/ platform level	Island platform, doors will open on the left
G Ground/ platform level	Eastbound	Blue Line toward Indian Creek (Terminus) →

== Buses at this station ==
The station is served by the following MARTA bus routes:

- Route 21 – Memorial Drive ITP
- Route 109 – Peachcrest Road / Columbia Drive
- Route 115 – Covington Highway
- Route 116 – Redan Road
- Route 119 – Hairston Road
- Route 121 – Memorial Drive OTP / Pleasantdale
- Route 125 – Clarkston / Embry Hills
