= SEC District station =

MARTA rail station

W1 SEC District
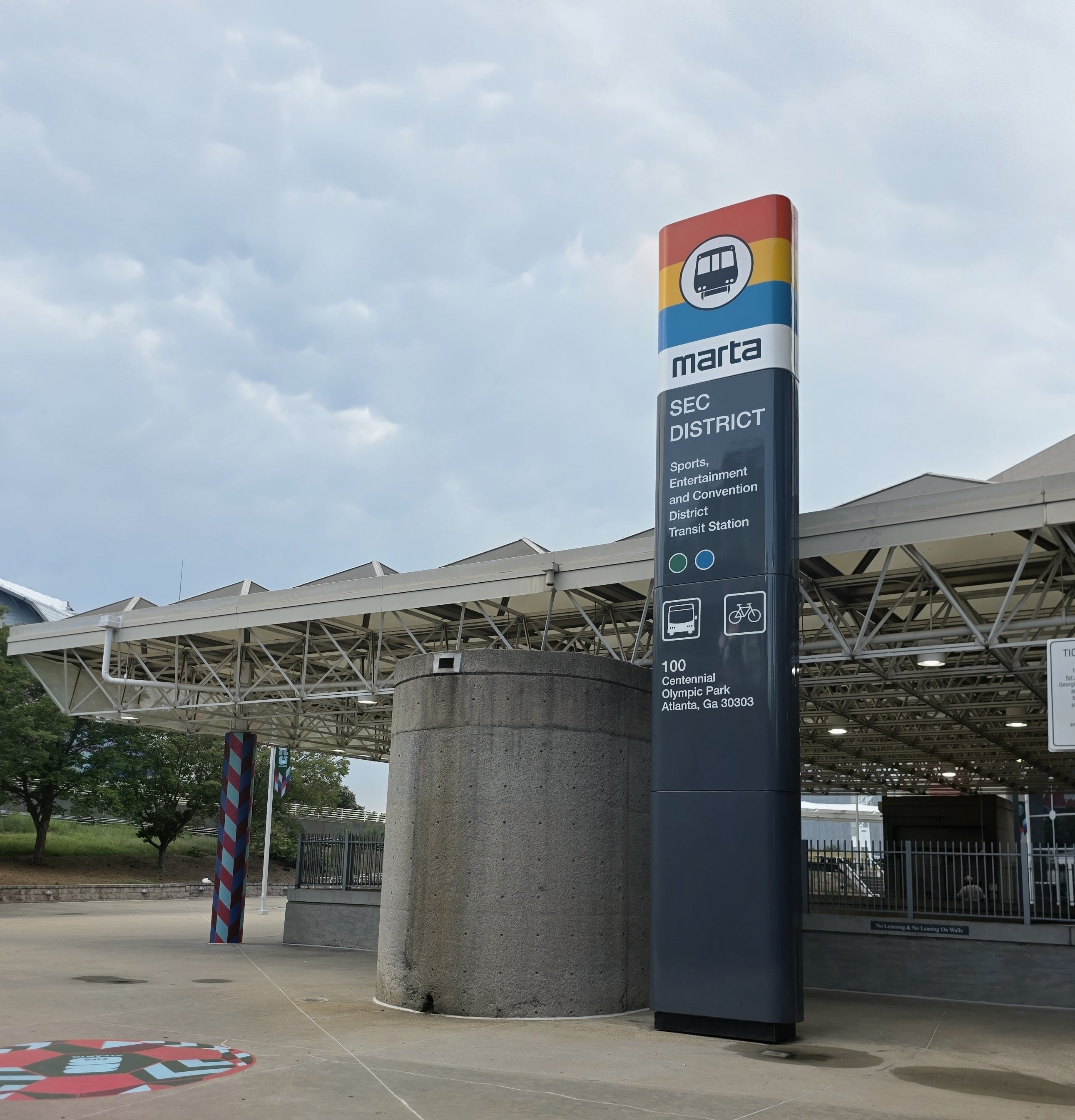
- Entrance of SEC District

General information
- Location: 100 Centennial Olympic Park Drive NW; Atlanta, GA 30303
- Coordinates: 33.756293°N 84.397759°W
- Platforms: 1 island platform
- Tracks: 2

Construction
- Structure type: Open-cut
- Parking: None
- Cycle facilities: None
- Accessible: YES
- Architect: Cooper Carry & Associates, Inc.

Other information
- Station code: W1

History
- Opened: December 22, 1979; 46 years ago
- Former names: Omni (1979–1992); Omni/Dome/World Congress Center (or "Omni/Dome/GWCC") (1992–2000); Dome/GWCC/Philips Arena/CNN Center (2000–2019); GWCC/CNN Center (2019–2025)

Passengers
- 2013: 2,107 (avg. weekday) 0%

Services
Preceding station	MARTA	Following station
Vine City toward Hamilton E. Holmes	Blue Line	Five Points toward Indian Creek
Vine City toward Bankhead	Green Line	Five Points toward King Memorial or Edgewood/Candler Park
Location

Sports, Entertainment and Convention District (SEC District) is a below-grade subway station in Atlanta, Georgia, United States, on the Blue and Green lines of the Metropolitan Atlanta Rapid Transit Authority (MARTA) rail system. Located on the western edge of Downtown Atlanta, the station serves Mercedes-Benz Stadium, State Farm Arena, the Georgia World Congress Center and Centennial Olympic Park.

The station opened on December 22, 1979 as Omni station due to its proximity to the Omni Coliseum. The station's name expanded in 1992 as Omni/Dome/World Congress Center (or simply Omni/Dome/GWCC) with that year's opening of the Georgia Dome. By the year 2000, the station name had changed to Dome/GWCC/Philips Arena/CNN Center. In June 2019, MARTA held a town hall to gather community input on a new name for the station after the demolition of the Georgia Dome and the renaming of Philips Arena to State Farm Arena. The station was one of five MARTA rail stations that were under consideration for new names in 2019. The name of the station was changed to GWCC/CNN Center. On December 1, 2025, the name was changed to Sports, Entertainment and Convention District, six months before the 2026 FIFA World Cup.

Access is also provided to the Omni and Glenn hotels, The Center, the Georgia Aquarium, the College Football Hall of Fame, Centennial Yards, the National Center for Civil and Human Rights, Centennial Tower, and the World of Coca-Cola at Pemberton Place.

== Station layout ==
G	Street Level	Exit/Entrance
P Platform level	Westbound	← Green Line toward Bankhead (Vine City) ← Blue Line toward Hamilton E. Holmes (Vine City)
P Platform level	Island platform, doors will open on the left
P Platform level	Eastbound	Green Line toward Edgewood/Candler Park (weekends toward King Memorial) (Five Points) → Blue Line toward Indian Creek (Five Points) →

== See also ==
- Archives-Navy Memorial/Penn Quarter Station a station on the Washington Metro that also has a history of being named for nearby landmarks.
