= MARTA Archaeology Project =

Atlanta historical archaeology project

The MARTA Archaeology Project, later revived as the Phoenix Project, was an archaeological excavation initiative funded by the Metropolitan Atlanta Rapid Transit Authority (MARTA) before the construction of Atlanta's rapid transit system in the 1970s. MARTA contracted Georgia State University (GSU) to conduct the excavations.

== History ==
MARTA originally contracted GSU in 1974 for small-scale surveying of sections of the proposed rail lines. This partnership expanded in subsequent years with more substantial contracts signed in 1975, 1976, 1977, and 1979 for in-depth excavation. The project eventually encompassed both MARTA lines completely. Dr. Roy S. Dickens Jr. took the lead on the project. He and his students identified a total of 30 sites across the city and excavated an estimated 100,000 artifacts. 47% of the sites were discovered through on-site construction monitoring, 25% through historical documents, 19% through surface inspection, and the rest through testing and metal detection..

At the end of the project, MARTA made an indefinite loan of the materials to GSU.

Dr. Dickens moved to University of North Carolina at Chapel Hill in 1982 with the entire MARTA collection, but there was little interest in continuing research on the materials there. Dickens died in 1986. He had no successor to continue his research.

The collection was stored at the Georgia Museum of Natural History from 2000 until its reacquisition to Georgia State University.

== Phoenix Project ==
From 2011-2013, Dr. Jeffrey Glover facilitated the return of the MARTA collection to Georgia State University. The revival of the project was named the Phoenix Project for Atlanta's association with the phoenix (mythology) and for the "resurrection" of a forgotten archeological collection.

Glover now uses the collection as a teaching resource for students and it has been the subject of two master's theses and multiple presentations.

Currently, students and community volunteers are working on re-cataloguing the entire collection and digitizing artifacts of interest for the public.

== Scope ==
The excavation was divided into the Construct Construction Units (CCU). Identified archaeological sites were given an identifier in accordance with the Smithsonian trinomial, for example, site 9FU91. The GSU excavations covered Phase A of the MARTA construction and some of the 1979-1980 expansion, which included most of the East-West line and only a small part of the North-South line.

The collection currently consists of 469 banker boxes with a total estimate of 100,000 artifacts. The collection also includes field notes, photograph negatives, specimen catalogs, official MARTA reports, and other associated documentation.
