= Metropolitan Atlanta Rapid Transit Authority =

Public transit operator in Metro Atlanta, Georgia

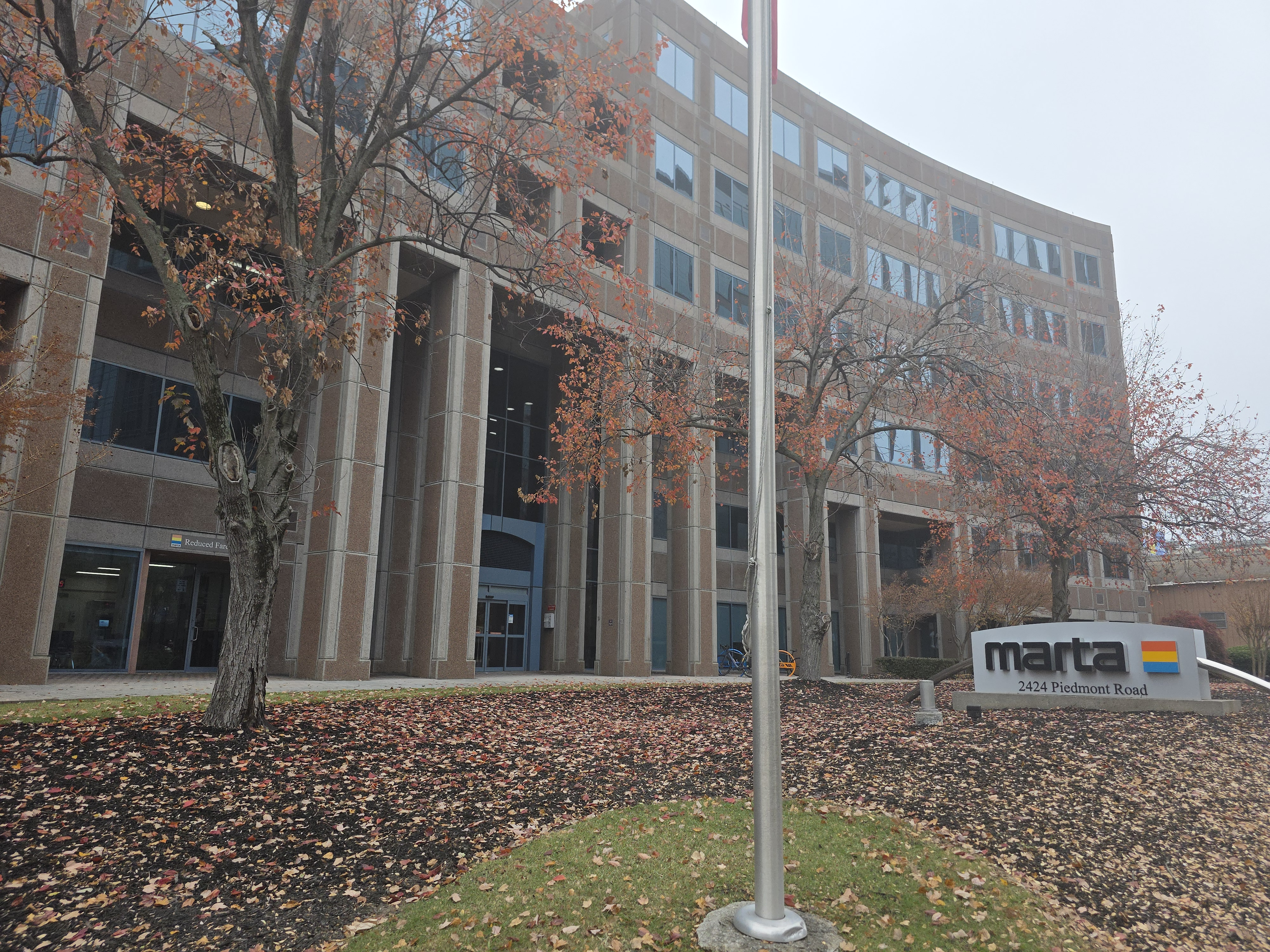
- The headquarters of MARTA in 2025

Overview
- Locale: Atlanta, Georgia
- Transit type: Rapid transit (heavy rail); Bus; Bus rapid transit; Paratransit; Microtransit; Streetcar
- Number of lines: Bus: 81; Bus rapid transit: 1; Rail rapid transit: 4; Streetcar: 1
- Number of stations: 38 (rail); 12 (streetcar)
- Daily ridership: 258,700 (weekdays, Q2 2026)
- Annual ridership: 65,752,400 (2025)
- Chief executive: Jonathan Hunt
- Headquarters: 2424 Piedmont Road NE, Atlanta, GA 30324
- Website: itsmarta.com

Operation
- Began operation: February 17, 1972; 54 years ago (buses); June 30, 1979; 47 years ago (rail)

Technical
- System length: 48 mi (77 km)
- Track gauge: 4 ft 8 1/2 in (1,435 mm) standard gauge
- Electrification: Third rail, 750 V DC (rapid transit); Overhead line, 750 V DC (streetcar)
- Top speed: 70 mph (110 km/h)

The Metropolitan Atlanta Rapid Transit Authority (MARTA /ˈmɑːrtə/) is the principal public transport operator in the Atlanta metropolitan area. Formed in 1971 as strictly a bus system, MARTA operates a network of bus routes linked to a rapid transit system consisting of 48 miles (77 km) of rail track with 38 subway stations. MARTA's rapid transit system is the eighth-largest rapid transit system in the United States by ridership.

MARTA operates almost exclusively in Fulton, Clayton, and DeKalb counties, although they maintain bus service to two destinations in neighboring Cobb County, while Doraville station serves portions of Gwinnett County via Ride Gwinnett buses. MARTA also operates paratransit service for disabled customers and on-demand microtransit service for people in areas with first or last-mile issues within their neighborhood.

In 2025, the entire system (bus and subway lines) had 65,752,400 rides, or about 258,700 unlinked passenger boardings per weekday in the second quarter of 2026.

Expansion of the MARTA system stalled after the completion of three new rail stations in 2000. In 2016, Atlanta voters approved a historic sales tax increase to raise $2.7 billion over 40 years, in order to significantly expand the MARTA system (dubbed the More MARTA program), including 29 miles of light rail transit, 13 miles of bus rapid transit, arterial rapid transit, transit centers and multiple infill MARTA stations. Since its inception, the More MARTA program has been criticized for slow progress, delays, and reversals on executing its list of expansion projects.

== History ==
=== Beginnings ===
MARTA was proposed as a rapid transit agency for DeKalb, Fulton, Clayton, Gwinnett, and Cobb counties. These were the five original counties in the Atlanta metropolitan area, and to this day are the five largest counties in the region and state. MARTA was formed by an act of the Georgia General Assembly in 1965. In the same year, four of the five metropolitan area counties (Clayton, DeKalb, Fulton, and Gwinnett) and the City of Atlanta passed a referendum authorizing participation in the system, but the referendum failed in Cobb.

Although a 1968 referendum to fund MARTA failed, in 1971, voters in Fulton and DeKalb counties successfully passed a 1% sales tax increase to pay for MARTA operations, while Clayton and Gwinnett counties overwhelmingly rejected the tax in the referendum. Gwinnett County remains outside of the MARTA system. In November 2014, however, Clayton County voters passed a 1% sales tax to join the MARTA system, reversing its 1971 decision. The initial sales tax was matched by a $900 million grant from the federal government that was originally earmarked for a rapid transit system in Seattle that was rejected by voters.

The agency agreed to purchase the existing, bus-only Atlanta Transit Company in 1971; the sale of the company closed on February 17, 1972, giving the agency control over all public transit in the immediate Atlanta area.

=== Heavy rail system ===
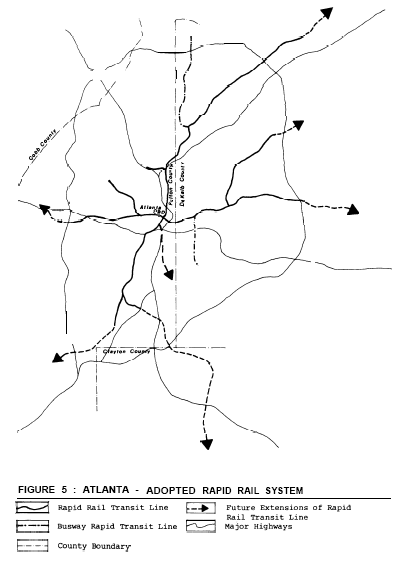
Map of the initial plan of the MARTA rail system from 1976

Construction began on MARTA's heavy rail system in 1975, with the first rail service commencing on June 30, 1979. The system has since built most of the proposed rail lines, as well as stations in Dunwoody, Sandy Springs, and North Springs, which were not included in the original plan. The missing rail segments from the original plan include a Tucker-North DeKalb line with service to Emory University and North Druid Hills, a Northwest line with service to Brookwood and Northside Drive, the extension of the West line to Brownlee-Boulder Park near Fairburn Road, the extension of the Proctor Creek line to West Highlands, and a branch off the south line to Hapeville and Clayton County.

Georgia State University was contracted to undergo archaeological excavations of rail construction areas in the late 1970s with the MARTA Archeology Project. Artifacts from the excavations are still housed at GSU.

In December 2000, MARTA opened the final three MARTA rail stations to be built, Dunwoody, Sandy Springs and North Springs - all north of the Interstate 285 Perimeter. The tracks to those stations were run on the surface of the median strip of Georgia 400, which was constructed just east of the Buckhead area as a tollway during the early 1990s. This is one of just two places at which the MARTA rail system extends outside of Interstate 285. The other is at the Indian Creek Station in eastern DeKalb County.

Since 2000, there have been no active railway expansion projects in the MARTA system due to lack of additional sales-tax funding, the need to spend its limited capital budget on refurbishing its older rolling stock, replacing the fare-collection system, repairing the tracks and their electrical systems, and other long-term maintenance, repair, and operations requirements.

=== Service expansion ===
On September 27, 2010, MARTA opened a bus rapid transit line along Memorial Drive from Kensington Station to the Goldsmith Road MARTA park-and-ride lot in Stone Mountain and Ponce De Leon Avenue. The bus had two routes, the Q Express and Q Limited. Express service was discontinued due to low ridership in 2013.

On November 4, 2014, Clayton County residents approved the 1% sales tax to join MARTA. Bus service was begun in March 2015. The contract also includes provisions for future rail transit to the county by 2025. In 2018, commuter rail was selected as the locally preferred alternative of transit mode along the Clayton County corridor, with plans to construct a line from East Point station to Jonesboro and Lovejoy. Those plans fell apart after the Norfolk Southern Railway said it would not allow MARTA to use its track.

In July 2018, MARTA also took over operations of the Atlanta Streetcar, which was initially built by the city in 2014.

==== Expansion to Gwinnett County ====
In September 2018, MARTA's board of directors and the Gwinnett County Board of Commissioners gave conditional approval to an agreement that would see MARTA assume, and significantly expand, operations of Gwinnett's bus system (in operation since 2001) and clear the way for the long-sought-after extension of MARTA's rail system into the county from its current terminus at Doraville. The population of Gwinnett County has significantly increased, and become more racially and ethnically diverse, since 1990, the last time the county rejected joining MARTA. Whereas white business elites were the initial demographic to support the MARTA in 1965, most black voters had voted to fund transit. Large communities of rural white Georgians opposed MARTA.

The original plan in 2018 included a detailed multi-year plan to expand heavy rail rapid transit in Gwinnett County. Some aspects of the Connect Gwinnett plan include a train that runs every ten minutes and buying more buses to take people to the MARTA station. This was possible because Georgia Legislature permitted counties to raise taxes to fund transit, which before was not allowed. The contract with MARTA would go into effect only if a public vote, that was scheduled for March 19, 2019, succeeded. The agreement called for a new one-cent sales tax that would be collected in Gwinnett County until 2057. On March 19, 2019, the third transit referendum failed, with 54.32% of the vote being "No" to expand. A fourth transit referendum was added to the ballot during the 2020 presidential election, which failed by a margin of slightly more than 1,000 voters as 50.13% of voters chose to vote against the referendum.

=== More MARTA program ===
In November 2016, 71% of Atlanta voters approved a half-penny sales tax increase to fund "More MARTA" projects, projected to raise $2.7 billion over 40 years, in order to significantly expand MARTA by constructing additional bus rapid transit and light rail lines, and multiple infill stations. In October 2018, MARTA's board approved and allocated funding towards a comprehensive list of "More MARTA" projects, including 29 miles of light rail transit (LRT), 13 miles of bus rapid transit (BRT), arterial rapid transit (ART), transit centers and 15 MARTA stations.

In March 2023, MARTA significantly scaled back its list of projects prioritized for delivery by 2028, to six transit lines and the renovation and construction of 3 transit stations. Among those prioritized projects included the Summerhill, Campbellton, and Clifton Corridor BRTs, the Atlanta Streetcar Downtown East Extension to Ponce City Market, reconstruction of Five Points station, and a platform extension at Bankhead station. Other projects, including Beltline LRT at other corridors, transit centers, and the Streetcar Downtown West Extension, were deprioritized. In response to the announcement, the Atlanta City Council unanimously approved an independent audit of More MARTA's program revenues and expenditures. MARTA has been criticized for slow progress on its More MARTA expansion, rising costs, and ongoing delays.

In June 2023, MARTA selected a designer for the Atlanta Streetcar extension. Construction of the $230 million extension was set to begin in 2025. In March 2025, Atlanta mayor Andre Dickens withdrew his support from the Streetcar East Extension, and reprioritized a streetcar extension into the Southside corridor instead. Various lobbying groups, including Better Atlanta Transit had lobbied against this extension, while advocates of Beltline transit, including Beltline Rail Now criticized the late-breaking decision.

In June 2024, MARTA began construction on the Summerhill BRT, MARTA's first new transit line in 2 decades and Atlanta's first BRT line. The $91 million project was projected to be complete in spring 2025. The 5-mile (8-kilometer) line will run from downtown Atlanta, through Summerhill, and end at the Atlanta Beltline. The line, named the "MARTA Rapid A-Line", will utilize new 60 ft (18 m) articulated electric buses. In April 2025, completion of construction was delayed to 2026, due to construction issues.

In August 2024, a city audit found that $70 million of the More MARTA capital fund intended for capital projects, had been siphoned to cover MARTA operational expenses. The audit also found that the sales tax had raised $493 million in More MARTA funding from fiscal years 2017 to 2023, while $69 million had been spent during that time period. In March 2025, MARTA disputed the audit findings, citing that another audit that found MARTA owed only $865,000 to the More MARTA capital fund.

== System ==
Interactive map of the MARTA rail system and the Atlanta Streetcar

MARTA is composed of a heavy rail rapid transit system, a streetcar line, and a bus system, all of which operate primarily within the boundaries of Fulton, Clayton and DeKalb counties. In addition to Atlanta itself, the transit agency serves various suburbs within its service area, including Alpharetta, Avondale Estates, Brookhaven, Chamblee, Clarkston, College Park, Decatur, Doraville, Dunwoody, East Point, Ellenwood, Fairburn, Forest Park, Hapeville, Jonesboro, Lake City, Lovejoy, Lithonia, Morrow, Palmetto, Riverdale, Roswell, Sandy Springs, Stone Mountain, and Union City. MARTA also serves Hartsfield–Jackson Atlanta International Airport via a station located next to the main terminal. Although Cobb County is not part of the MARTA system, the agency operates one limited bus route to the Cumberland Boulevard Transfer Center and another to Six Flags Over Georgia.

MARTA allows bicycles on its trains, and buses have room for two bicycles on racks mounted on the front of the bus.

In 2007, MARTA had 4,729 full and part-time employees, of whom 1,719 were bus drivers or train operators. Rail and bus operators, station agents, rail maintenance workers, and many other employees of MARTA are represented in negotiations by the Amalgamated Transit Union's Local 732.

=== Subway/metro ===
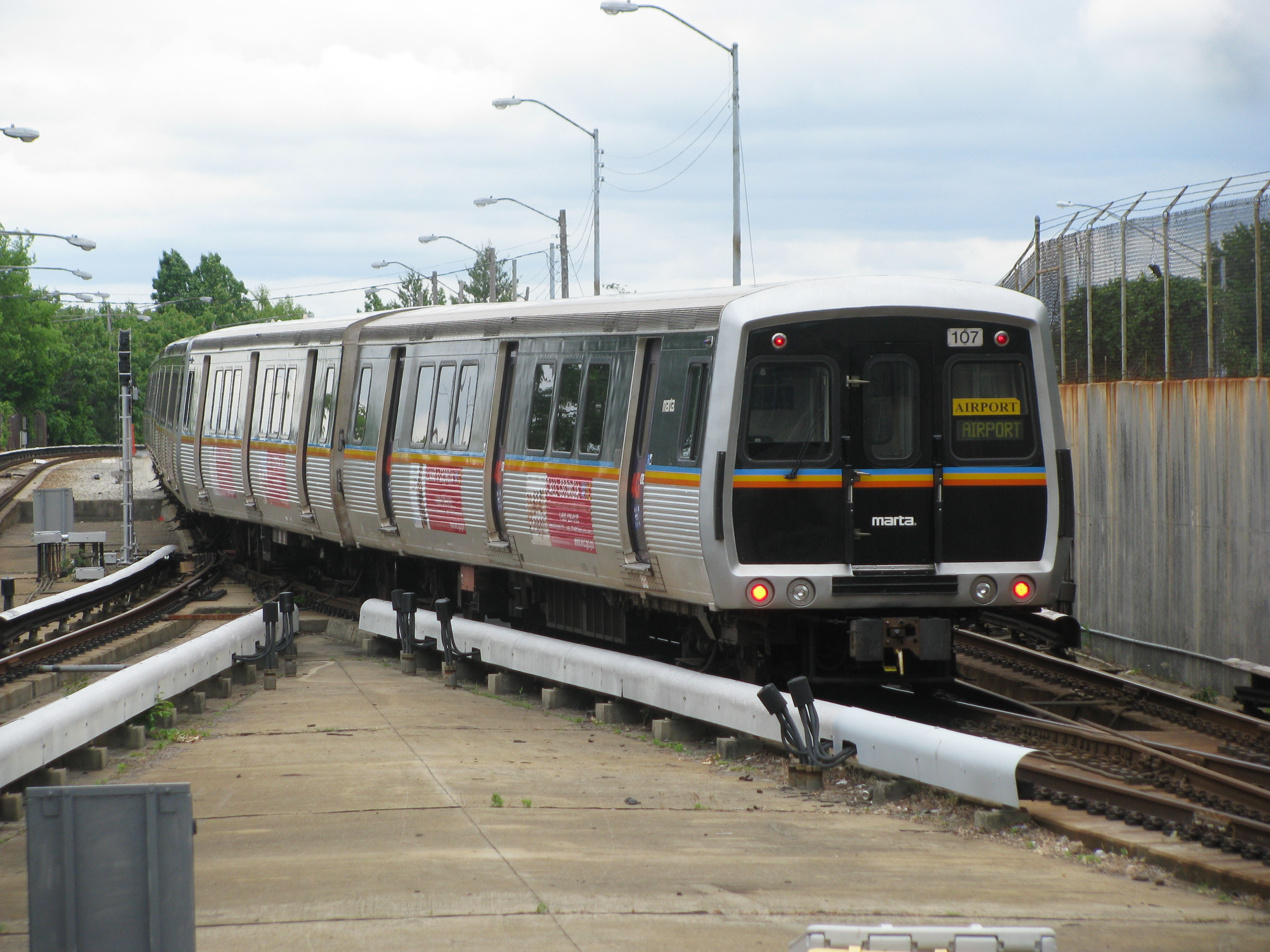
MARTA rail train switching tracks at Lakewood/Fort McPherson station

MARTA's rapid transit system has 47.6 miles (76.6 km) of route and 38 rail stations located on four lines: the Red Line (known as the North-South Line prior to October 2009), Gold Line (former Northeast-South Line), Blue Line (former East-West Line), and Green Line (former Proctor Creek Line). The tracks for this system are a combination of elevated, ground-level, and subway tracks.

The deepest station in the MARTA system is the Peachtree Center station, which is located in a hard-rock tunnel, 120 feet (37 m) beneath the city, where the highest hills in Atlanta are 1,100 feet (340 m) above sea level. No tunnel lining was installed in this station, or the adjacent tunnels. The architects and civil engineers decided to leave these with their rugged gneiss rock walls. The highest station in the MARTA system is the King Memorial station. It rises 90 feet (27 m) over a former CSX rail yard.

All rapid transit lines have an ultimate nexus at Five Points station, located in downtown Atlanta. MARTA trains are operated using the Automatic Train Control system, with one human operator per train to make announcements, operate doors, and to operate the trains manually in case of a control system malfunction or an emergency. Many of the suburban stations have free daily and paid long-term parking in park and ride lots.

=== Streetcar ===
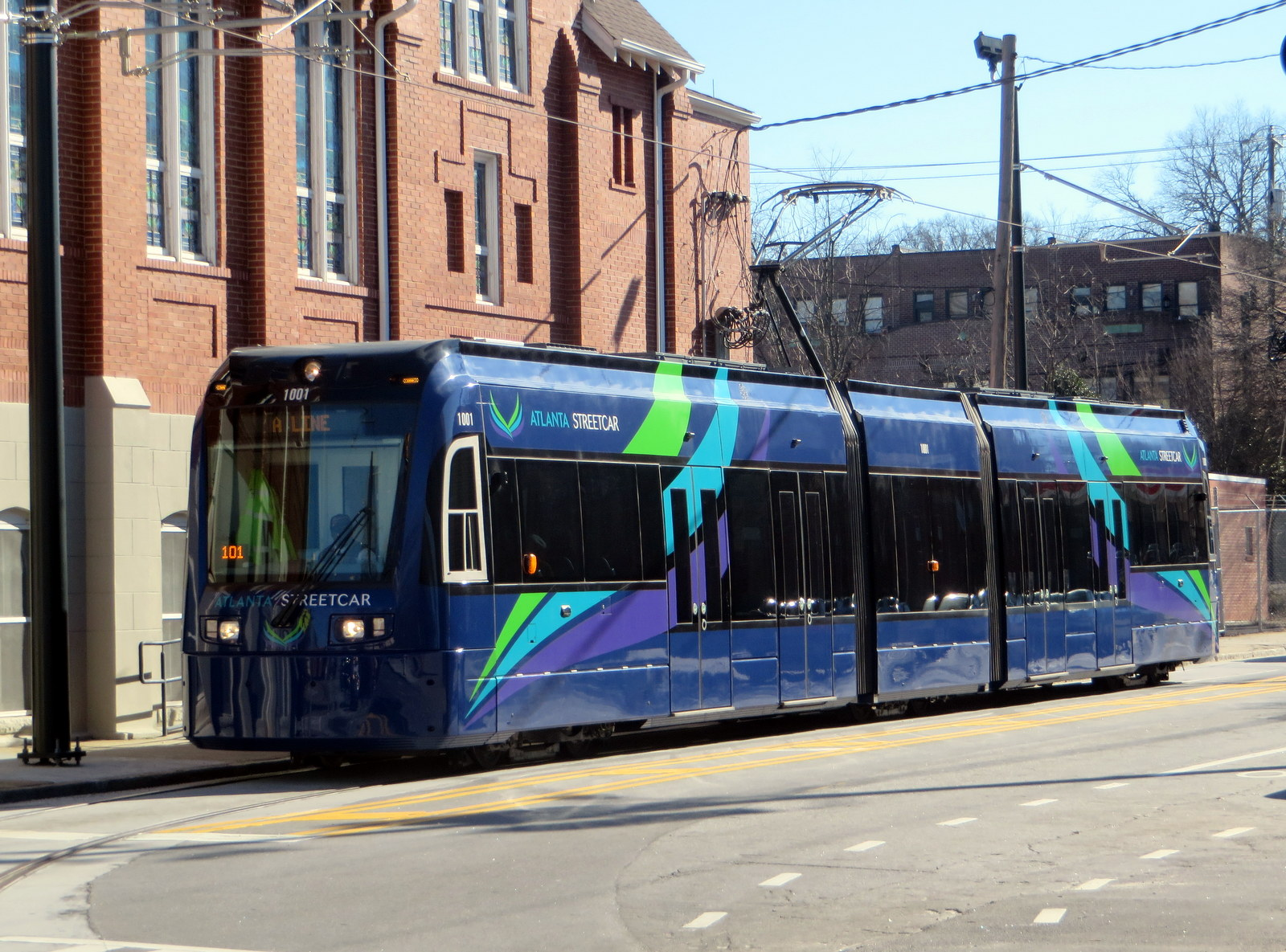
Atlanta Streetcar near the original Ebenezer Baptist Church in Sweet Auburn

The Atlanta Streetcar is a modern streetcar route that is powered by an overhead line and operates in mixed vehicle traffic. The system was constructed by the City of Atlanta and was integrated into MARTA operations on July 1, 2018. The streetcar operates on a 2.7-mile (4.3 km) pinched loop system in Downtown Atlanta.

The Atlanta Streetcar system uses Siemens S70 light rail vehicles. A total of four S70 cars were purchased and were built at two different facilities; the cars themselves were built in Sacramento, California while most other major components, like the propulsion system, were assembled at a plant about 30 miles (48 km) north of Atlanta, in Alpharetta. They were delivered in the first months of 2014 and are numbered 1001–1004.

=== Bus rapid transit ===
MARTA opened its first bus rapid transit (BRT) line, branded the Rapid A Line, on April 18, 2026, becoming the first such service in the Atlanta region. The 5 miles (8.0 km) route operates in dedicated, signal-prioritized lanes connecting South Downtown Atlanta with the Summerhill and Peoplestown neighborhoods and the Atlanta BeltLine's Southside Trail. Three more bus rapid transit lines are planned (Southlake, Campbellton, and another along SR-54 in Clayton County) and two arterial rapid transit lines along Cleveland Avenue, and Metropolitan Parkway are schedule to begin construction in October 2026.

The line includes 14 stations and operates daily from 5:00 a.m. to 1:00 a.m., with buses arriving every 10 to 15 minutes using dedicated lanes and traffic-signal-priority technology. The project, originally known as the Summerhill Bus Rapid Transit line, received a $12.6 million federal grant in 2018 toward an estimated $48.6 million budget, but construction delays and an electric-bus battery recall nearly doubled its final cost to approximately $123 million. As of April 2026, several of the line's permanent stations remained under construction, with MARTA anticipating completion of all 14 stations later in the year.

=== Buses ===
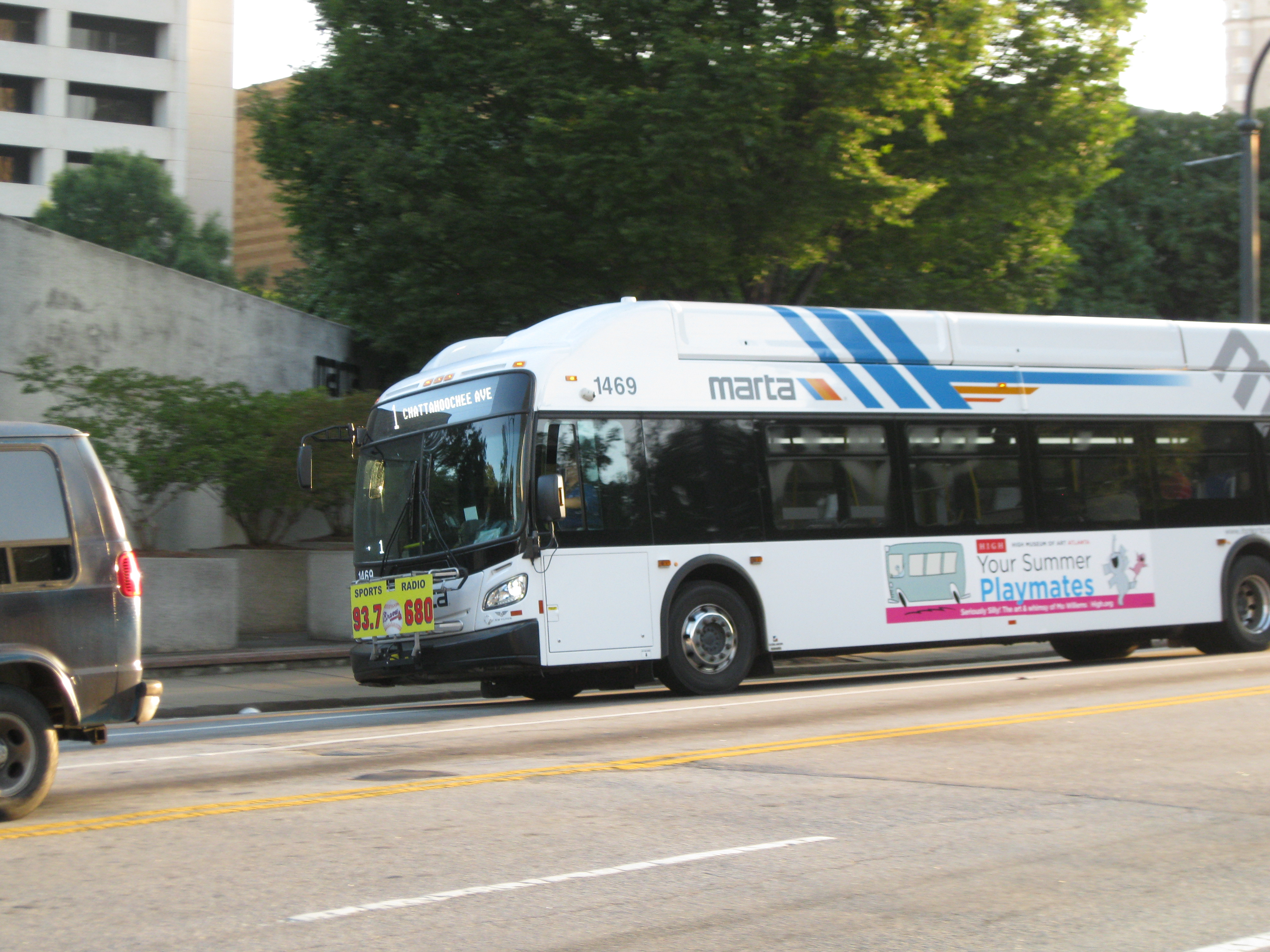
Route 1 bus leaving North Avenue station

MARTA's bus system serves a wider area than the rail system, covering areas in Fulton, Clayton and DeKalb counties such as the cities of Roswell and Alpharetta in North Fulton, along with South DeKalb. On April 18, 2026, MARTA launched the NextGen Bus Network, the system's first comprehensive route redesign since the 1970s, consolidating the system from 113 routes to 81 while more than tripling the number of corridors with all-day 15-minute-or-better frequency, from five to 17. As of fiscal year 2024, MARTA operated 397 buses in maximum service, according to Federal Transit Administration data. MARTA has one bus route providing limited service into Cobb County, Route 12, which connects Midtown to the Cumberland Transfer Center. MARTA shuttle service is available to Six Flags Over Georgia during the park's summer season.

=== Paratransit ===
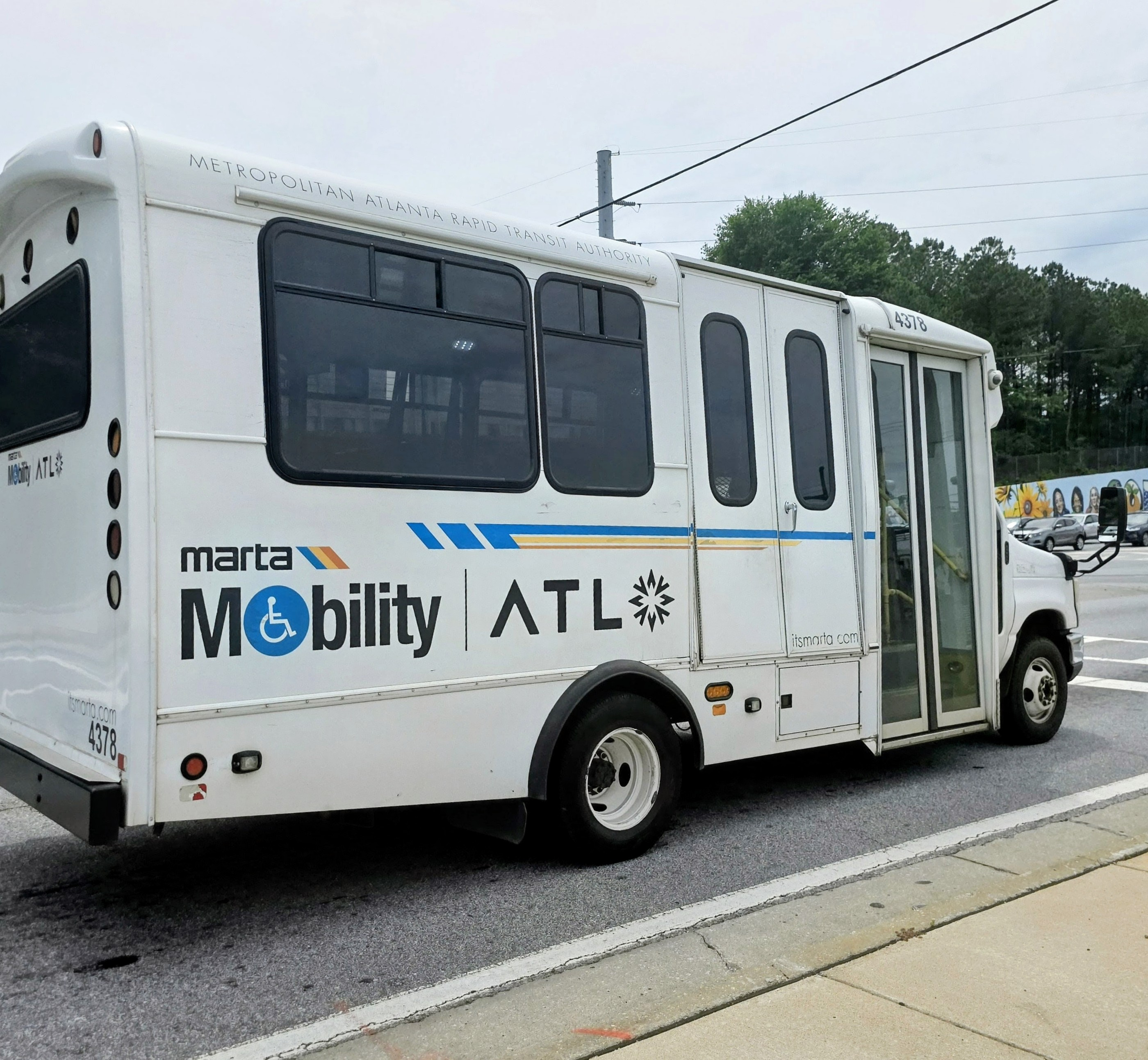
A MARTA Mobility van

MARTA provides the Mobility paratransit service in compliance with the Americans with Disabilities Act (ADA), and can either deliver passengers to their final destination or the closest accessible bus stop or rail station. MARTA Mobility serves areas within a 0.75-mile (1.2 km) radius of existing rail and bus routes. An application for acceptance into the Mobility service is required and reservations are required for each trip. As of fiscal year 2024, MARTA operated 222 Mobility vehicles in maximum service and provided 759,097 trips, according to Federal Transit Administration data.

A 2001 federal civil lawsuit, Martin v. Metropolitan Atlanta Rapid Transit Authority, was brought by several disabled riders who alleged MARTA was violating the ADA by failing to provide: bus schedule and route information in an accessible format, buses with working wheelchair lifts, stop announcements on rail and bus routes, and adequate staff to schedule and provide on-time Mobility service. The district court ruled in 2002 that MARTA had violated the ADA and granted the plaintiffs an injunction requiring MARTA to improve service to the disabled.

=== Microtransit ===
MARTA has a microtransit system called MARTA Reach that provides on-demand shuttle service from different underserved areas to train stations and bus stops using a mobile app. The system was initially piloted in 2022 using an app built in partnership with Georgia Tech. It was implemented in March 2026.

=== Fares ===
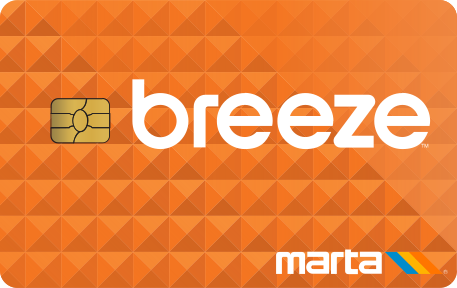
Orange third-generation Breeze Card

Currently, the one-way full fare for MARTA costs US$2.50. Passengers over 65, passengers with disabilities and Medicare recipients are eligible for discounted fares. A one-way paratransit fare is $4. Ten-trip and twenty-trip passes are available for purchase. MARTA also offers unlimited travel through multiple transit pass options ranging from one day to 30 days. MARTA uses the Breeze Card, a contactless smart card that allows riders to load money on the card for use over time and add prepaid passes. In 2026, MARTA implemented the Better Breeze system with updated faregates designed to support more contactless payment methods, like mobile wallet and debit/credit cards equipped with near-field communication.

Other connecting transit systems such as GRTA Xpress, Ride Gwinnett, and CobbLinc also use the Breeze system. Through formal fare reciprocity agreements, MARTA riders are able to transfer for free to the three other metro-Atlanta transit systems: Ride Gwinnett, CobbLinc and GRTA Xpress. Some of these agreements require that neither system have significantly more transfers than the other.

== Funding ==
In addition to fare collections, the MARTA budget is funded by a 1% sales tax in Fulton, Clayton and DeKalb counties along with limited federal money. In 2017, the City of Atlanta raised its sales tax for MARTA to 1.5%, after voters approved an additional 0.5% sales tax in November 2016 to fund the "More MARTA" system expansion program. When MARTA was founded, funds from the 1% sales tax were legally required to be split evenly between MARTA's operational and capital expenditure budgets, a restriction that did not apply to other sources of revenue, including passenger revenue. However, the requirement began to limit the amount of service MARTA could provide. The sales tax law was amended by the state legislature in 2002 to allow a temporary three-year 45% capital/55% operations split. A 2005 bill to renew the split was tabled by the legislature's MARTA Oversight Committee, forcing MARTA to pass a new budget with cuts in service. The temporary 45%/55% capital/operations split was renewed again in the 2006 state legislative session. The capital funds surplus has resulted in projects, such as a new US$100 million Breeze Card fare collection system and US$1.1 million automatic toilets in Five Points station, occurring at the same time that MARTA was struggling to pay for bus and rail operations. In 2015, the Georgia General Assembly approved a new bill that no longer requires MARTA to split the 1% sales tax.

The 1% sales tax was originally set to be reduced to 0.5% in 2032. In 2007, MARTA made a request to the City of Atlanta, DeKalb County, and Fulton County to seek a 15-year extension of the 1% sales tax from 2032 to 2047, with a 0.5% sales tax from 2047 to 2057. This was the fourth time in its history that MARTA sought such an extension, the most recent previously in 1990. MARTA said the commitment to the tax was needed for the agency to secure long-term financing in the form of bonds to pay for future expansions to the system. The resolution called for four new routes: bus rapid transit from H.E. Holmes station to Fulton Industrial Boulevard, bus rapid transit from Garnett station to Stonecrest Mall, transit for the Beltline, and a direct transit link from Lindbergh Center to Emory University (formerly called the "C-Loop"). The City of Atlanta voted 12–1 in March 2007 to approve the extension, and the DeKalb County Commission approved it the following month. Some Fulton County officials initially opposed the extension on the basis that the proposed service expansions did not include a previously proposed expansion of the North Line to Roswell and Alpharetta in North Fulton County.

In February 2020, all four MARTA jurisdictions — Atlanta, Fulton, DeKalb, and Clayton County, which had joined MARTA in 2014 — approved a further extension, known as the 15th Amendment to the Rapid Transit Contract and Assistance Agreement, maintaining the full 1% sales tax through 2057 rather than allowing it to step down to 0.5% in 2047 as previously scheduled.

=== Lack of regional financial support ===
Since the formation of MARTA, the Georgia state government has never contributed to MARTA operational funding. Currently, MARTA is the largest mass transportation system in the United States not to receive state funding. Revenue from the Georgia motor fuel tax is currently restricted to roads and bridges and cannot be used for public transportation, further complicating potential sources of state funding for MARTA. In addition, the other largest two suburban counties (Gwinnett and Cobb counties) have refused to join or fund MARTA. Both Gwinnett and Clayton counties initially agreed to join MARTA but refused MARTA rail and bus service when voters in their respective counties voted against paying to help fund the system. Clayton County finally joined MARTA in November 2014. Gwinnett, along with Cobb County, created independent bus transit: Cobb Community Transit on July 10, 1989, Ride Gwinnett on November 5, 2001. A separate regional bus transit service, Xpress, is operated by the Georgia Regional Transportation Authority in partnership with 11 metro Atlanta counties, including Fulton and DeKalb, and began service on June 6, 2004.

The MARTA Board members are criticized for not being regular users of MARTA and thus are not actually aware of the concerns of MARTA commuters. Former CEO Keith Parker was known for commuting daily from Dunwoody to the headquarters using the Red Line.

Due to no funding from the state of Georgia and its limited funding from Fulton, Clayton and DeKalb counties, MARTA has struggled for many years to provide adequate service to the metropolitan area. As a result, MARTA has been seen as inconvenient and ineffective. People who own cars don't use the system while residents in suburban areas usually drive their car to a MARTA rail station (instead of using bus service) if their job is near an adjacent one. MARTA's financial structure (being tied to a 1% sales tax) has forced the agency to cut services during times of economic depression, further resulting in complaints about the inconvenience and inadequacy of MARTA services.

Although surrounding counties do not pay for MARTA, many of their residents use MARTA by driving directly to a MARTA station or by using a county or regional bus system that connects to MARTA. A license plate study from 1988 to 1997 showed that 44% of the cars parked in MARTA park-and-ride lots were from outside of Fulton and DeKalb counties. Current fare reciprocity agreements also allow non-paying counties to provide bus service for their residents that provide free connections to MARTA. According to a 2000 MARTA ridership study, 12% of MARTA riders live outside of MARTA's service area.

=== Effects of race on expansion and funding ===
It is often argued that racial politics also play a role in the operation and future service planning for MARTA. Opponents of Georgia's transportation policies have alleged a race-based two-tiered system, where billions are spent by the state on highway expansion to aid the automobile commutes of mostly white residents of the suburbs and rural areas, while service cuts at MARTA have hurt mostly black riders in low-income areas where residents cannot afford automobile ownership. Proponents contest that a portion of state funding for highways comes from the gasoline tax, a user fee analogous to the fare MARTA riders pay. Supporters of MARTA have alleged that the lack of participation by other metro Atlanta counties is rooted in racism and classism. In 1987, David Chesnut, then chairman of MARTA, stated, "The development of a regional transit system in the Atlanta area is being held hostage to race, and I think it's high time we admitted it and talked about it." As part of its Title VI plan, MARTA data revealed that in 2015, 75% of MARTA riders were black. The percentage of white riders is particularly low outside rush hours.

== Governance ==
MARTA is a joint powers authority that is governed by a board of directors, consisting of representatives appointed from the city of Atlanta (3 members), and the remainder of the counties of Fulton (3 members), Clayton (2 members) and DeKalb (4 members). Additionally, there is 1 representative from the Georgia Department of Transportation, and 1 representative from Georgia Regional Transportation Authority who also serve as non-voting members.

Positions on the MARTA board are directly appointed by the organizations they represent. Although the state of Georgia does not contribute to MARTA's operational funding, it still has voting members on the MARTA board. A similar situation existed for both Clayton and Gwinnett counties during most of MARTA's history; as a consequence of passing the authorization referendum but not the funding referendum. Gwinnett County has representation on the MARTA Board of Directors without paying into the system. The Georgia General Assembly also has a standing committee that is charged with financial oversight of the agency.

The highest position at MARTA is the general manager and chief executive officer. Since August 2025, the Interim General Manager/CEO of MARTA has been Johnathan Hunt, who previously worked as MARTA's chief legal counsel. The previous CEO, Collie Greenwood, stepped down a month prior, citing immigration status issues.

=== Police ===
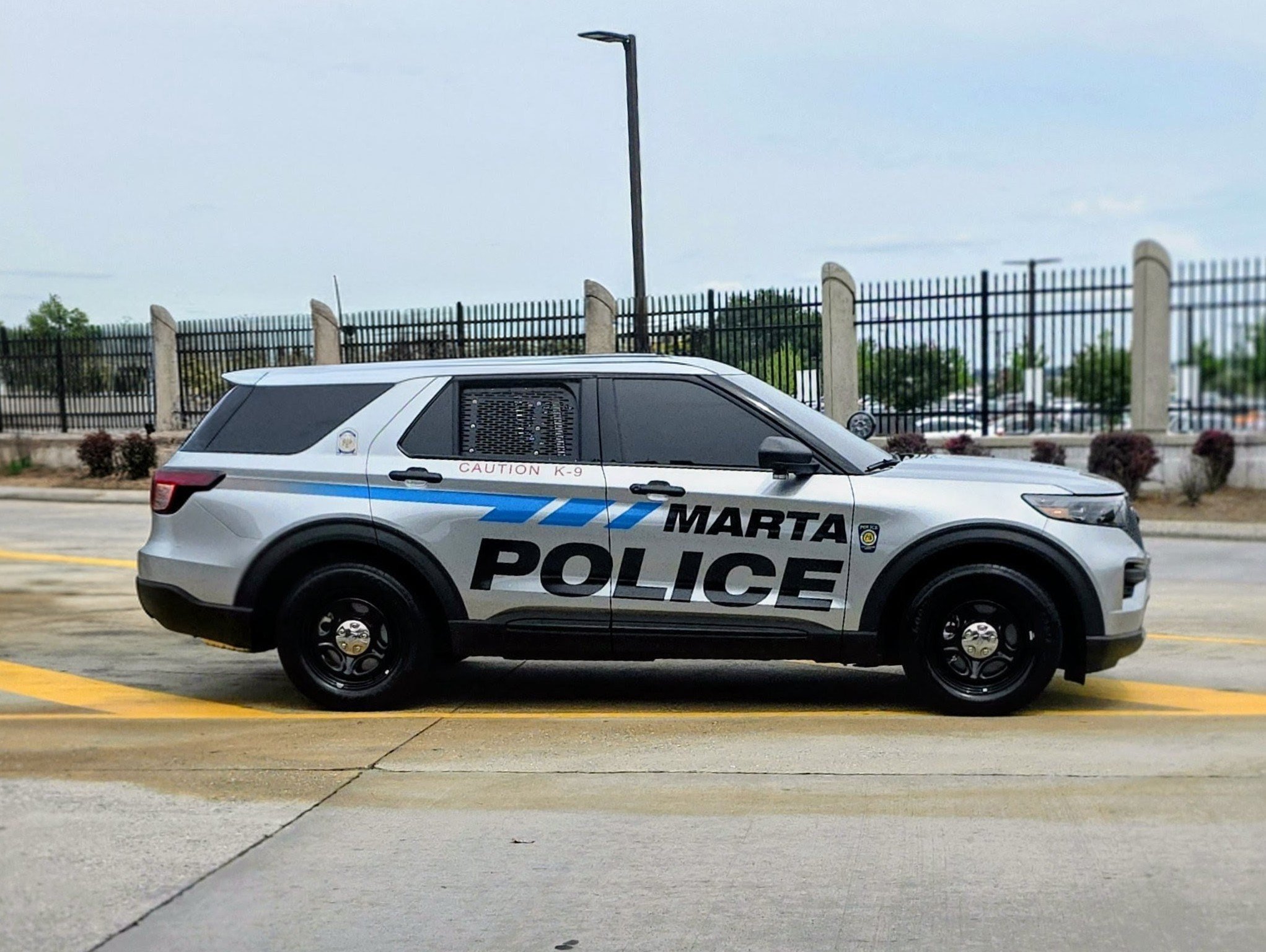
A MARTA Police vehicle

The MARTA Police Department (MPD) was founded in 1977 and is responsible for patrolling the transit system. Since March 2020, the chief of MARTA police is M. Scott Kreher, who joined the department after retiring from the Atlanta Police Department with more than 27 years of law enforcement experience. The department has received consecutive Gold Standard Awards from the Commission on Accreditation for Law Enforcement Agencies (CALEA) and the Transportation Security Administration's Baseline Assessment for Security Enhancement. As of June 2026, MPD employed 268 sworn officers, down from approximately 400 before the COVID-19 pandemic, with the agency working toward a goal of 300.

== Performance and safety ==
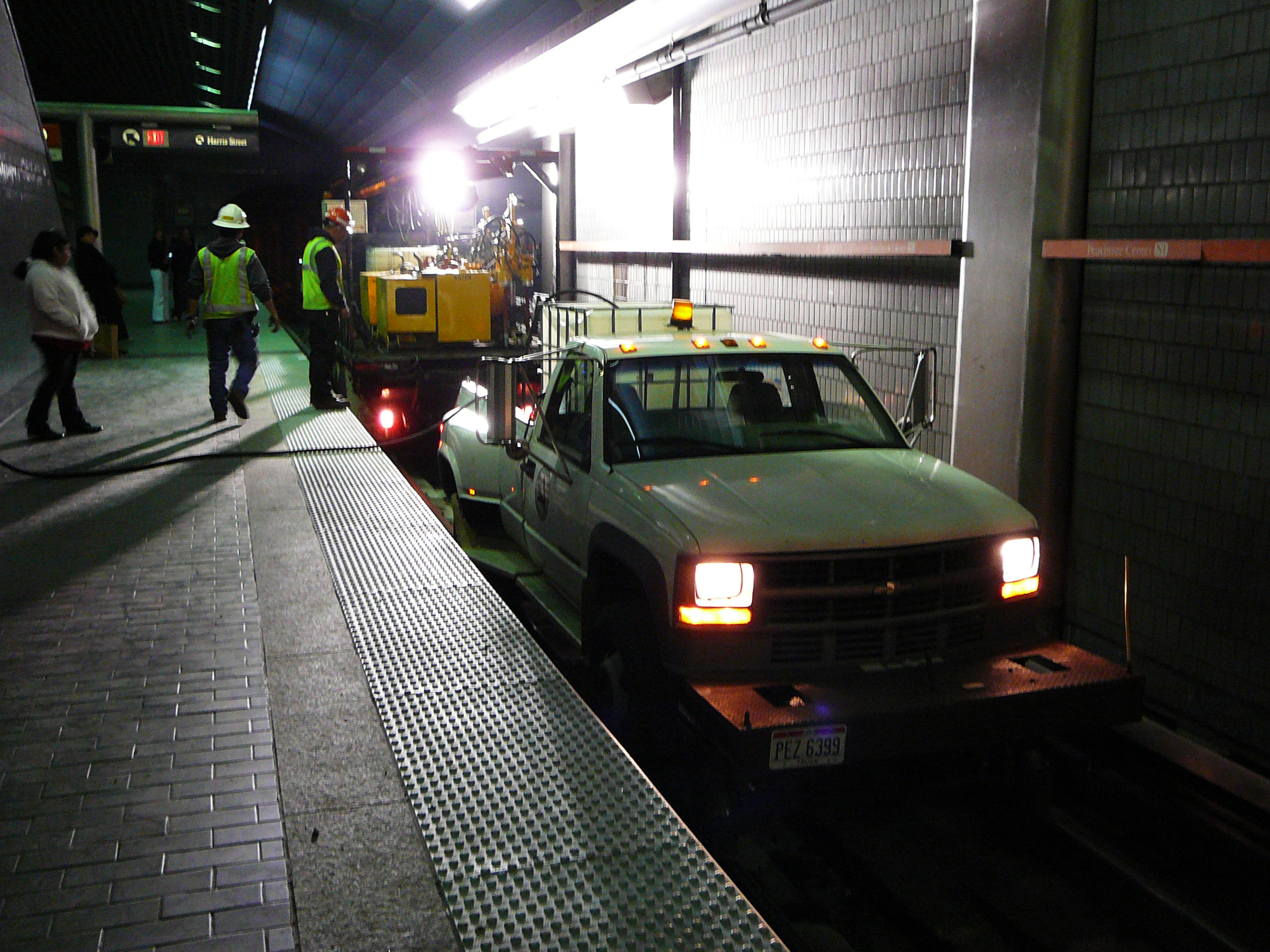
MARTA construction at Peachtree Center

During the 2005 fiscal year, MARTA had a customer satisfaction rate of 79%. On-time performance for rail service was 91.64%. The mean distance between rail service interruptions was 9,493 miles (15,278 km) and the mean distance between bus failures was 3,301 miles (5,312 km). For fiscal year 2007, MARTA had a farebox recovery ratio of 31.8%.

A 2024 analysis found that MARTA's rail lines had experienced a significant surge in weekend service cuts and delays due to single tracking, resulting in 5,500 canceled trains in 2023. This was especially problematic on the Gold and Red Lines, which were single-tracked 80% of weekends, while the Blue and Green Lines were single-tracked 50% of weekends.

=== Accidents and incidents ===
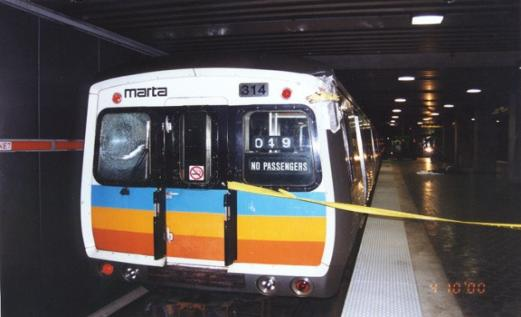
April 2000 MARTA accident at Lenox station

MARTA has had two fatal accidents that resulted in a formal investigation by the National Transportation Safety Board. On February 25, 2000, a train near Avondale station struck two technicians who were inspecting a signal relay box; one was fatally injured and the other suffered serious injuries. The workers had failed to apply for a safe clearance restriction for the track work. In addition, the rail system center controller, who was aware of the workers, failed to notify train drivers of the technicians' presence. A second accident occurred on April 10, 2000, when a train struck a bucket lift containing two contract workers at Lenox station, fatally injuring both. Although the MARTA employee who was accompanying the workers notified the rail control center of the work over the track, the control center employee failed to block off the section of the track in the automated rail control system and also failed to notify the unscheduled southbound train of the workers' presence. In 2001 MARTA settled with the families of the two killed workers for US$10.5 million.

In addition to these accidents, MARTA trains have derailed five times in recent years. The most recent incident occurred in January 2019 when an out of service train derailed between Airport station and College Park station. The operator was not injured. A previous derailment occurred on December 4, 2006 Medical Center station when a train carrying passengers was moved over a rail switch. No injuries were reported. In July 1996 during Atlanta's hosting of the Olympics, a paired car on a train that had developed mechanical problems was uncoupled from other cars at Indian Creek station (the last station on the east line). The train began rolling, crashing through the bumper at the end of the rail line and running off of the track. The train operator, the only person on board, received minor injuries. In June 1996 a minor derailment occurred at the junction between the North and Northeast lines; MARTA estimated 150 people were aboard. The derailment occurred when a rail supervisor told the train driver to reverse the train after realizing the train had gone the wrong way at a track split; a MARTA investigation of the incident showed the derailment caused $125,000 of damage to the train and track and caused injury to 16 passengers. And in August 1994 a minor derailment occurred at a switch between Candler Park and Inman Park. Approximately 20 passengers were on board and no one was injured.

In 2006, many MARTA rail cars became overheated due to unusually high summertime temperatures, damaging on-board propulsion equipment. As a result, many trains broke down and had to be taken out of service for repair. This was further compounded by MARTA's rail car rehabilitation project. To compensate for the reduced number of operating rail cars, MARTA shortened trains from six to four cars in length. This resulted in almost half of the trains being shortened, creating crowded conditions for passengers.

On December 31, 2007, MARTA had three separate escalator accidents that injured at least 11 people. The incidents occurred as large crowds were going to the Chick-fil-A Bowl. Two escalators failed at Five Points station, and one escalator failed at Dome/GWCC/Philips Arena/CNN Center station. MARTA initially blamed the incidents on rowdy patrons jumping on the escalator. A subsequent formal investigation showed that the braking systems and a weak motor were to blame for the incidents.

In September 2008, a Fulton County jury awarded a woman $525,000 for injuries received in an accident at the Peachtree Center station. MARTA has been criticized for its escalator maintenance policies after recent injuries due to escalators overloading, but has discussed plans to improve its policies and regulate passenger loads with posted station agents.

=== Criminal activity ===
Throughout MARTA's history, there have been recurring concerns about criminal activity on its trains and in and around its stations, even as historical comparisons have at times shown MARTA's crime rates in line with similar-sized systems. In the aftermath of a 1985 aggravated assault against the daughter of a Georgia State University professor, complaints were made that MARTA was underreporting its annual crime statistics. A 1986 review of the previous year's records by MARTA's audit office and the state legislature's MARTA Oversight Committee (MARTOC) showed no deliberate underreporting of crime, but rather over-reporting of crime because MARTA included crimes not related to the rail line and did not adhere to the Uniform Crime Reporting system (reporting multiple crimes by the same person instead of only the most serious crime).

According to Federal Transit Administration records, MARTA's crime statistics are in line with those of similar-sized systems, such as Bay Area Rapid Transit in the San Francisco Bay area. That same 2007 analysis found that, despite those comparatively low overall figures, individual high-profile incidents had repeatedly fueled public perceptions that MARTA was unsafe and lacked an adequate police presence, even though the system maintains its own police department. From 2005 to 2009, two homicides and one rape were reported on MARTA property. The most common crime reported was larceny. The most common area for crime was MARTA's rail service, followed by MARTA's parking lots. For fiscal year 2009, MARTA had a crime rate of 3.09 per 1 million riders, with 483 crimes reported during the entire year.

More recent figures show a continued decline: MARTA Police Department data show Part I crimes (a category including homicide, rape, aggravated assault, robbery, burglary, and larceny) fell from 283 in 2020 to 156 in 2025, a decrease of nearly 45 percent, including a drop in homicides from five to one. Crime had risen 15 percent in 2024 before declining again in 2025.

In May and June 2026, a series of violent incidents on the system — including two stabbings, one of them fatal, and a shooting — led the U.S. Department of Transportation to direct the Federal Transit Administration (FTA) to open a safety investigation into MARTA. The probe, part of a broader federal review that has also examined transit agencies in Chicago, Washington, and New York, required MARTA to submit historical crime and fare-evasion data and a breakdown of its security spending within 15 days. The FTA stated that MARTA's crime rate was nearly twice the national average for transit systems. MARTA officials disputed that characterization, citing the year-over-year and five-year crime declines described above. In response to the investigation, MARTA announced new security measures, including a dedicated "train patrol" unit, and reported an 8 percent year-over-year reduction in crime as of June 10, 2026. The investigation comes amid Atlanta's hosting of matches in the 2026 FIFA World Cup, and remained ongoing As of June 2026.

Voters in Cobb County and Gwinnett County have repeatedly rejected ballot measures to join or expand MARTA, citing the cost of expansion and doubts about its necessity in their areas. Some opponents have also argued that expanding MARTA's service area would increase crime in suburban communities; at a 2023 Cobb County Commission meeting, for instance, resident Pamela Reardon told commissioners that residents did not want MARTA because it would "increase our crime." Transit advocates and county officials have disputed that argument, pointing to the Washington Metro, which provides service to economically depressed areas with comparatively limited problems in suburban Washington, D.C., stops.

== Proposed expansions ==
MARTA was built with at least three stubs for rail lines that were never built. The Northwest Line towards Cobb County has a stub tunnel east of Atlantic Station, but that redevelopment has not been built with a MARTA station in mind, and Cobb County would instead most likely get a light rail or commuter rail system (neither of which have been studied) or a bus rapid transit service (see Northwest Corridor HOV/BRT). The Northwest line was reduced to two planned stations but was later dropped entirely.

The South Line's branch to Hapeville was considered for extension into Clayton County as far away as Forest Park, but this idea was also cut off when the voters of that county initially refused to approve tax funding for the line. Another idea for a rail spur line was for an above-ground line from near the International Airport for a spur line to the town of Hapeville, but no work has been initiated. The idea to revive expansion plans in the form of heavy rail and bus was approved to go once again before voters in November 2014 by the Clayton county commissioners in July 2014 with a 1% sales tax providing the funding for said expansion. This time, the referendum was approved and Clayton County voted to join MARTA, the system's first ever expansion outside of Fulton, Dekalb and the city of Atlanta.

Yet another proposed spur line would have branched off the Blue Line in DeKalb County, Called the Tucker-North Dekalb Line it would have run northeast to the area of North Druid Hills, Emory University, and the town of Tucker. Now under consideration is an idea for light rail line (rather than heavy rail) from Avondale Station to Lindbergh Center, via Emory/CDC.

The Northeast Line of the rail system, which has ended in Doraville for two decades, was considered for extension into Gwinnett County as far as northeast as Norcross, Georgia, but this idea was cut off when the voters of that county declined to approve sales-tax funding for it.

The Proctor Creek branch was also projected to go one more station northwestward to the West Highlands neighborhood, but no work has been done on that one either.

Expansion westward to Fulton Industrial Boulevard through the use of either heavy rail extension or bus rapid transit has been proposed as an extension of the West Line since the system was originally planned.

=== Clifton Corridor ===
Rapid transit alternatives are as of October 2011, under consideration for the Clifton Corridor, from Lindbergh Center, following the CSX rail corridor to Emory University and the Centers for Disease Control, with possible continuation along the northern edge of Decatur on to Avondale MARTA station. Bus, light rail and heavy rail rapid-transit options had been considered, with light rail being selected as the preferred option.

=== Mall at Stonecrest Expansion ===
Eastward expansion focuses on bus rapid transit from downtown Atlanta along I-20 and extension of heavy rail transit from Indian Creek station, south along I-285 to I-20, then east along the I-20 corridor to the Mall at Stonecrest. The current Green Line would also be extended east from its current terminus at Edgewood/Candler Park station to Mall at Stonecrest. This proposed extension has not been studied further since 2018.

=== Connect 400 ===
The Georgia 400 Transit Initiative (also known as "Connect 400") is a MARTA project to study options for expanding high-capacity transit along the Georgia State Route 400 corridor into the northern reaches of Fulton county. The initiative, kicked off in December 2011, envisages an 11.9-mile extension of rapid transit service, starting in the south at North Springs Transit Station, the current terminus of the existing MARTA Red Line. From there, such an extension would continue northward through the cities of Sandy Springs, Roswell, and Alpharetta, terminating in the vicinity of Windward Parkway.

As of the fifth public meeting on the subject on September 26, 2013, the study had narrowed the field of transit technology alternatives to three, all using existing right-of-way along SR 400: heavy-rail transit (HRT, extending the Red Line northward), light-rail transit (LRT), or bus rapid transit (BRT). Early designs for all three options include stations near Northridge Road, Holcomb Bridge Road, Mansell Road, North Point Mall, and Windward Parkway; initial sketches of the LRT and BRT options also include a station near Old Milton Parkway.

As of June 2015, the project is moving into the Environmental Impact study stage of the planning process. According to MARTA Representatives at the April 2015 meetings, the expansion could open in 2025 at the earliest assuming a best-case scenario. Federal funding is still not approved; the Environmental Impact study must be complete. By the April 2015 meeting, the LRT option has been discarded. The HRT option has been approved as the Locally Preferred Alternative, though two BRT options exist - one that would run in a dedicated bus guideway and the other to integrate with Georgia DOT's planned work for the corridor. The GDOT integrated option would include sharing normal traffic lanes at least in some parts of the route. The plans for stations at Mansell Rd. and Haynes Bridge Rd. have been merged into one station at North Point Mall.

As of June 2018, the project's adopted alternative is bus rapid transit (BRT) style bus service utilizing express lanes along new toll lanes. Heavy rail expansion will not be considered according to the signed House Bill (HB) 930.

=== Atlanta Beltline ===
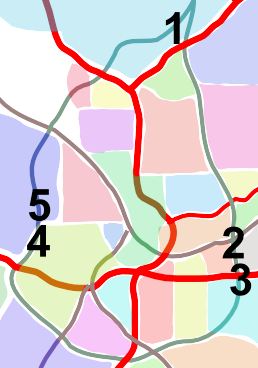
Map showing Beltline and connected neighborhoods; numbers represent discontinuities in current rights of way

The Atlanta Beltline is a 22-mile loop of multi-use trails, parks, and proposed transit circling Atlanta's central neighborhoods, planned for redevelopment on former freight rights-of-way. Although voters approved a dedicated sales tax for Beltline light rail as part of the 2016 More MARTA referendum, as of 2026 no construction has begun and no track has been laid.

In August 2025, Atlanta Beltline, Inc. (ABI) released a draft transit plan estimated at $3.5 billion in 2025 dollars, following a two-year, federally funded study. The plan calls for roughly 26 stations and approximately 24 miles of light rail, including crosstown connector segments, arranged as overlapping loops designed to provide an effective 10-minute headway at each station. The proposed cost includes $270 million for 42 rail vehicles and $210 million for support and maintenance facilities, with funding sources, an operating budget, and a construction schedule still undetermined as of the plan's release. The Northwest quadrant, running roughly 5.5 miles (8.9 km) from Bankhead to the Lindbergh area along an active CSX freight corridor, was identified as the most technically challenging and costly segment, at an estimated $800 million, since it lacks the abandoned rail right-of-way available elsewhere on the loop.

Implementation has been complicated by a dispute between Atlanta city officials and MARTA over which corridor to build first. A report published in January 2026 found that city, MARTA, and Beltline officials had voted in 2025 to quietly halt design work on the previously prioritized Eastside corridor without public disclosure, a decision that drew criticism after it became public. Atlanta Mayor Andre Dickens subsequently withdrew his support for extending the Atlanta Streetcar along the Eastside Trail and redirected priority toward a Southside corridor instead. As an interim measure, the Beltline and its partners began a free, autonomous shuttle pilot in the second quarter of 2026, connecting MARTA's West End station to the Beltline's Southwest Trail at the Lee + White development, funded by a $1.75 million grant from the Atlanta-region Transit Link Authority.

The Beltline's Southside Trail is also now served by MARTA's first bus rapid transit line, the Rapid A Line, which began operating in April 2026.

=== Proposed new infill stations ===
Adding another station to the existing line near Armour Yard (MARTA's main railyard, opened 2005) has also been discussed, as the Red and Gold MARTA lines, the northeast Beltline light rail, proposed commuter rail lines to points northeast such as Athens (the "Brain Train") and Gainesville, would all pass through Armour Yard. Other stations that have been proposed are; Mechanicsville, Boone, Murphy Crossing, and Krog.

The proposed Atlanta Multimodal Passenger Terminal (MMPT) would be built next to Five Points station, connecting MARTA to surface passenger rail, including commuter rail, future intercity rail, Amtrak, and possible high-speed rail in the Southeast Corridor.

Additional expansion plans for MARTA and other metro Atlanta transportation agencies are detailed in Mobility 2030 a timeline by the Atlanta Regional Commission for improving transit through the year 2030.

== See also ==
- List of United States rapid transit systems by ridership
- Transportation in Atlanta
