= The Mall at Stonecrest =

Shopping mall in Stonecrest, Georgia

Coordinates: 33.700°N 84.095°W

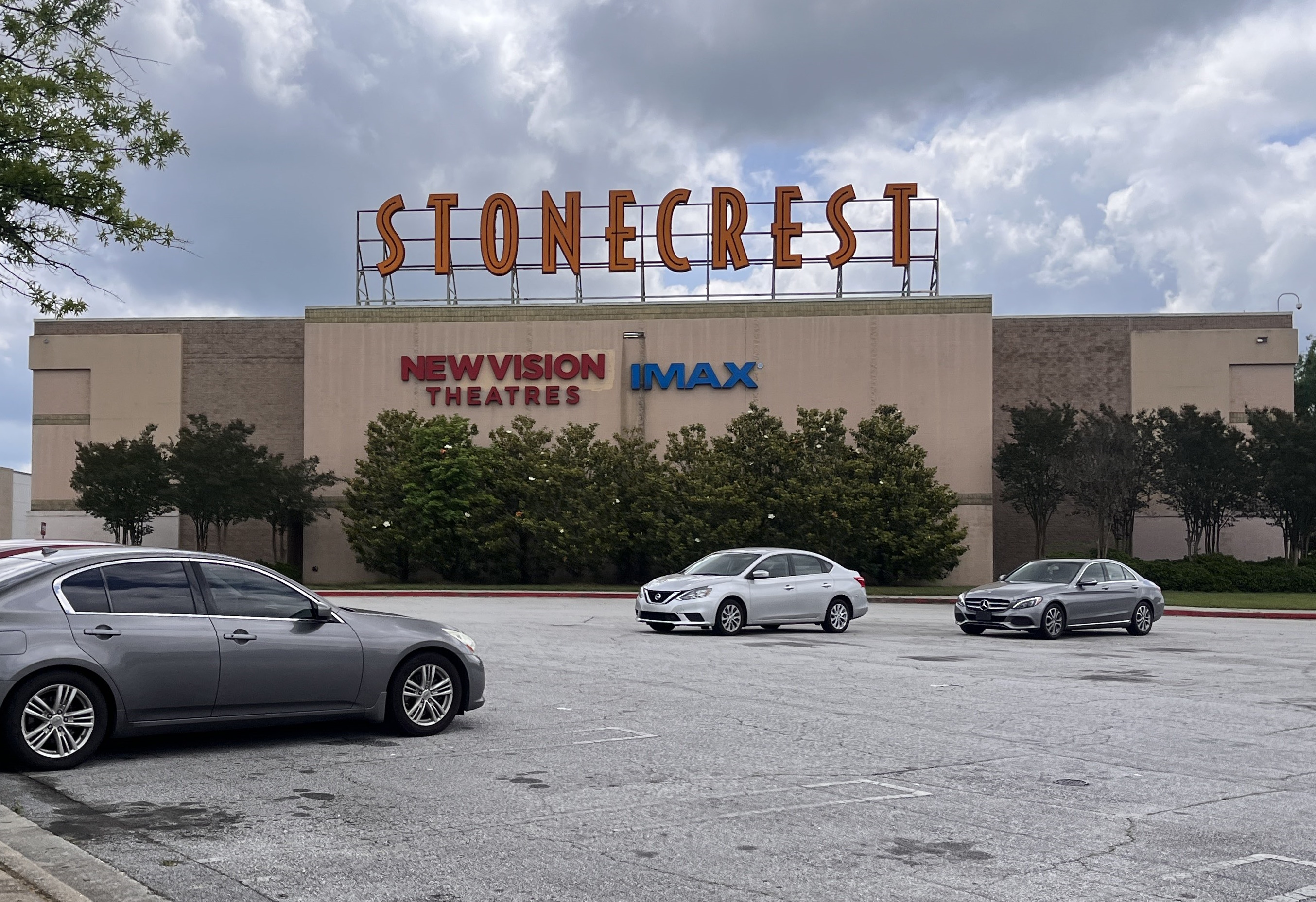
- One of the exteriors of The Mall at Stonecrest in May 2023.
- Location: Stonecrest, Georgia, U.S.
- Opened: October 24, 2001; 25 years ago
- Developer: Forest City Enterprises
- Manager: Urban Retail Properties
- Num. of stores: 120+
- Num. of anchor tenants: 5 (5 open)
- Floor area: 1,162,000 sq ft (108,000 m^{2})
- Floors: 2
- Website: mallatstonecrest.com

The Mall at Stonecrest (also referred to and often known as Stonecrest Mall) is a super regional shopping mall along Interstate 20 in eastern Metro Atlanta that opened in 2001 on the growing I-20 corridor. It is off exit 75 in Stonecrest, Georgia, which became a city in 2017.

The mall features the traditional retailers JCPenney, Macy's, and Dillard's. Attached to the mall on the second floor is a movie theater located in the outdoor plaza near the pavilion food court. Other stores and restaurants surround the mall. As of 2014 new restaurants were opening in the plaza as old ones closed. Apartments and condos are also slowly increasing in the area, making Stonecrest a mixed-use community.

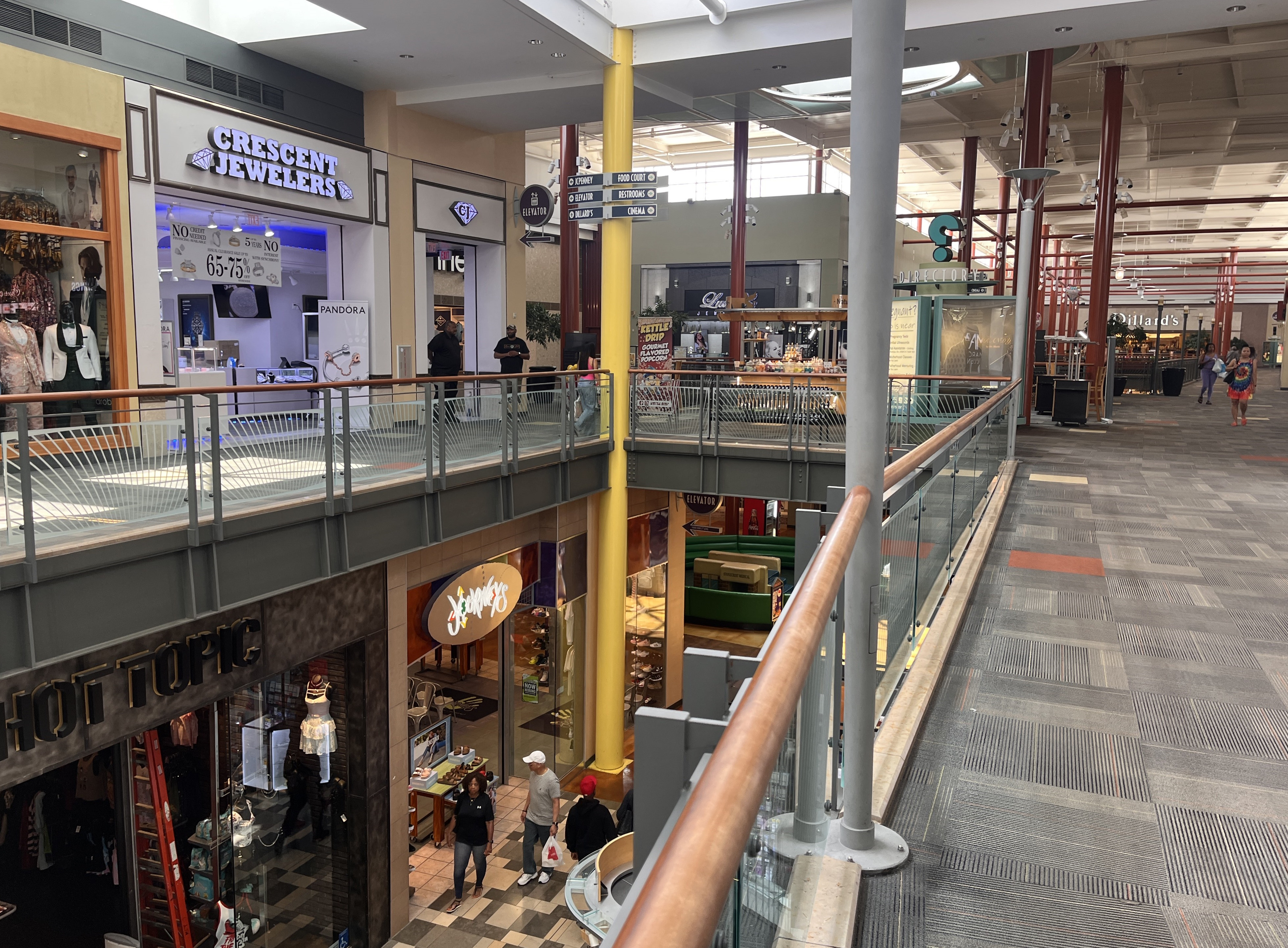
Interior of the Mall at Stonecrest in May 2023. One of the mall's anchor stores, Dillard's, is visible in the background right.

== History ==
=== Planning ===
The mall was envisioned and planned in the last quarter of the 20th century, with the Atlanta Journal-Constitution reporting projected opening dates in the late 1980s (after the dedications of Gwinnett Place and Town Center at Cobb) and early 1990s (when North Point Mall opened). Originally proposed names included Turner Hill Mall, Interstate East Mall, and Metro East. Several times the project stalled because of developer issues. One land developer had problems getting retailers to commit (at the time, South DeKalb Mall was still thriving).

=== Delays, alternative proposals, and opening ===
The land was cleared several times, and local residents often questioned whether the mall would be built. DeKalb County planners at various times envisioned other things for the area, including a convention center, an outdoor theatre, mid-rise to high-rise apartment units, a MARTA rail station (proposed terminus for the east line), and a satellite college campus. While the county did construct a library (Stonecrest Library), other developments did not go ahead. The mall finally opened on October 24, 2001, featuring Dillard's, JCPenney, Parisian, Rich's, and Sears.

In 2014, the Mayor of Lithonia, Deborah Jackson, proposed three successive plans to annex parts of what are now the City of Stonecrest. The earliest proposal included much of Lithonia Industrial Park, north of I-20. The final, and largest, proposal would have included much of what is now the City of Stonecrest, including Stonecrest Mall; much of the Stonecrest Regional Activity Center; and Lithonia Industrial Park. Numerous business owners in the Industrial Park banded together to fight the proposals. The City Council of Lithonia created a task force of stakeholders to study annexation. Members of the task force demanded that the mayor, at a minimum, obtain a feasibility study for annexation, as well as demonstrate to owners' satisfaction that annexation would not increase their property taxes. Mayor Jackson could not overcome the stakeholders' objections, and plans for annexation were dropped, thereby making possible creation of the new City of Stonecrest. The cityhood bill went through various legislative hurdles at the Georgia General Assembly and in November 2016 was approved by 59% of voters in a public referendum, with elections and official municipal incorporation in spring 2017.

The mall and business corridor were previously served by the South DeKalb Business Association. In 2011, the Stonecrest Business Alliance Incorporated was formed to focus on the Stonecrest Overlay District. With the advent of the new City of Stonecrest, the Business Alliance has extended its membership to all businesses in the city. The sprawling East Metro DeKalb Community Improvement District was created by the DeKalb County Board of Commissioners in 2014. That CID is chronically underfunded, and has undertaken no projects within the City of Stonecrest other than limited off-duty police patrols in the western fringe of the city. It is proposed to be replaced within the City of Stonecrest by the future Stonecrest CID.

In 2006 much of what is now the City of Stonecrest was included in the designation of the Arabia Mountain National Heritage Area by Act of Congress. The mall is accessible via the Arabia Mountain PATH, which runs throughout the 40,000-acre (160 km^{2}) area. Stonecrest Mall is one example of how businesses and residences can be included in a national heritage area unlike a national park.

=== Incidents ===
In May 2009, in response to sometimes violent disruption, the management instituted its Parental Involvement Program (derisively known in the community as the "anti-teenager policy"), whereby anyone under age 18 must be accompanied by an adult after a 4pm "curfew" on weekends, or be forced to leave by mall security.

In April 2010, an argument over a parking space led to a stabbing and a shooting.

In December 2011, police had to quell a disturbance at the mall on the day of the release of a new Air Jordan limited edition shoe. The mall was to open at 8 am but at about 7 AM already 200 people were waiting outside. The mall door was pried open and the crowd rushed inside to the door of the store selling the shoes.

=== Commercial performance ===
In January 2013, it was reported that that mall was "beset by debt issues that could leave it vulnerable to foreclosure".

On November 2, 2017, Sears announced the closure of its anchor store. The store closed in January 2018.

Kohl's, located in the former Parisian building, closed on November 1, 2016. The structure became offices for the Atlanta Sports City project on October 5, 2017; however, the $200 million project was abandoned in 2019, with litigation by investors ensuing.

On March 4, 2017, the mall opened Round One Entertainment, a bowling and amusement center featuring the latest Japanese arcade games, billiards, karaoke, ping pong, darts, and a restaurant with a full-service bar. The store closed on December 4, 2022.

In November 2021, a SeaQuest opened its largest aquarium in the former Sears store of the shopping mall. The aquarium closed for renovations in June 2023, with plans announced to reopen under new ownership and a new name.

In August 2021, the vacant Kohl's became a Lisa Young beauty supply store.

== Clientele ==
The mall serves a diverse clientele including blacks and Hispanics, and provides both black and white Santas in the period running up to Christmas.
