= Avondale station (MARTA) =

MARTA rail station

E7 Avondale
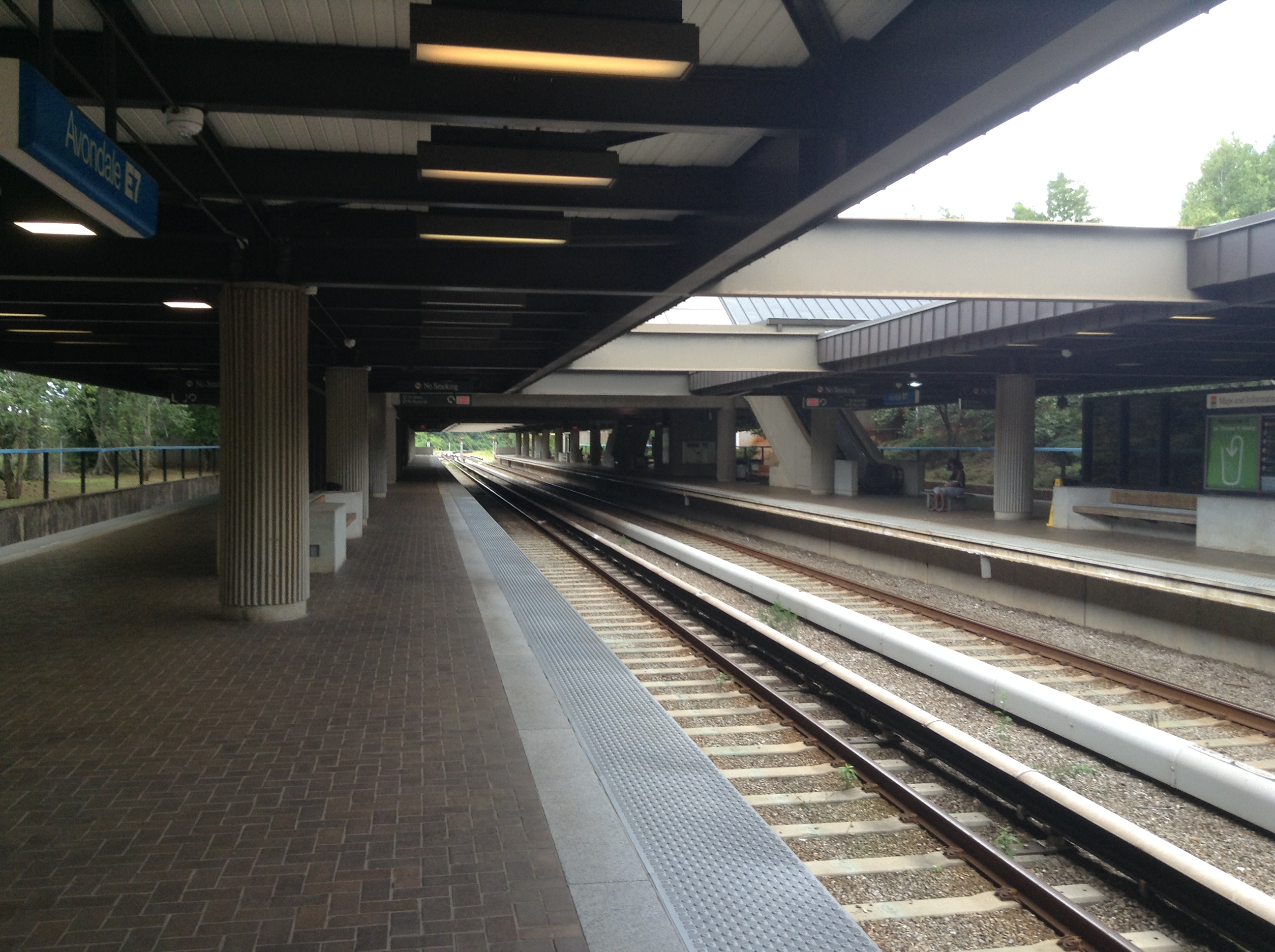
- Avondale MARTA station

General information
- Location: 915 East Ponce de Leon Avenue; Decatur, Georgia 30030; United States
- Coordinates: 33.775277°N 84.281903°W
- Platforms: 2 island platforms
- Tracks: 4
- Connections: MARTA Bus: 17, 75, 115, 118, 120, 127, 128

Construction
- Structure type: At-grade
- Parking: 734 spaces; Daily parking
- Cycle facilities: Yes
- Accessible: YES

Other information
- Station code: E7

History
- Opened: June 30, 1979; 47 years ago

Passengers
- 2013: 4,327 (avg. weekday) ▼5%

Services
Preceding station	MARTA	Following station
Decatur toward Hamilton E. Holmes	Blue Line	Kensington toward Indian Creek
Edgewood/Candler Park toward Bankhead	Green Line Limited Service	Terminus
Future Services
Preceding station	MARTA	Following station
Decatur toward Bankhead	Green Line	Terminus
Proposed service
DeKalb Farmers Market towards Lindbergh Center	Clifton Corridor	Terminus
Location

Avondale is an at-grade subway station in Decatur, Georgia. It is on the Blue Line of the MARTA rail system. The station is at-grade and has two island platforms, one for each direction. The center two tracks are not normally used for through service. Because of these middle tracks, it is not uncommon for trains to be bound for Avondale, having passengers change trains at Avondale. A limited number of Green Line trains originate and terminate at Avondale rather than at their normal terminus at Edgewood/Candler Park, though these trains bypass East Lake and Decatur.

Green Line service is expected to be extended to Avondale full-time when the platform at Bankhead station is expanded to accommodate 8-car trains, in order to increase service on the East-West trunk line.

This station opened on June 30, 1979; this was the original eastern terminus of the Blue Line. This station has parking (823 spaces) available on E. College Avenue.

This station mainly serves Avondale Estates and Decatur Heights, as well as the cities of Clarkston and Tucker, and communities in Scottdale, Northlake & North Decatur.

East of the station is Avondale Yard, a train yard used to service, clean, store, and test the fleet of rolling stock it services. Adjacent to the yard is Laredo Bus Facility.

== Station layout ==
M
Mezzanine
Crossover between street and platforms
G
Ground/
platform level
Westbound
← Blue Line toward H. E. Holmes (Decatur)
Island platform, doors will open on the left
Westbound
← Green Line limited service toward Bankhead (Edgewood/Candler Park)
Eastbound
Green Line limited service termination track →

Blue Line limited service toward Indian Creek (Terminus) →

Island platform, doors will open on the left
Eastbound
Blue Line toward Indian Creek (Kensington) →

== Clifton Corridor ==
Avondale station is a proposed terminus for rapid transit along the Clifton Corridor, a proposed public transportation corridor stretching from Lindbergh Center eastwards, following the existing CSX rail corridor to Emory University, with possible continuation along the northern edge of Decatur via Suburban Plaza on N. Decatur Rd. and on to Avondale. Bus, light rail and heavy rail rapid-transit options are under consideration.

== Landmarks and popular locations served ==
- Your DeKalb Farmers Market
- Avondale Estates Village
- Dekalb Veterans Administration Clinic
- Dekalb Department of Family and Children Services (DFACS)

== Bus service ==
The station is served by the following MARTA bus routes:

- Route 17 - Clairmont Road / North Druid Hills Road
- Route 75 - Lawrenceville Highway
- Route 115 - Covington Highway
- Route 118 - Rockbridge Road
- Route 120 - East Ponce de Leon Avenue
- Route 127 - Winn Way
- Route 128 - Valley Brook Road
