= Clifton Corridor =

Proposed transportation corridor in Georgia, US

Coordinates: 33.821995°N 84.367447°W

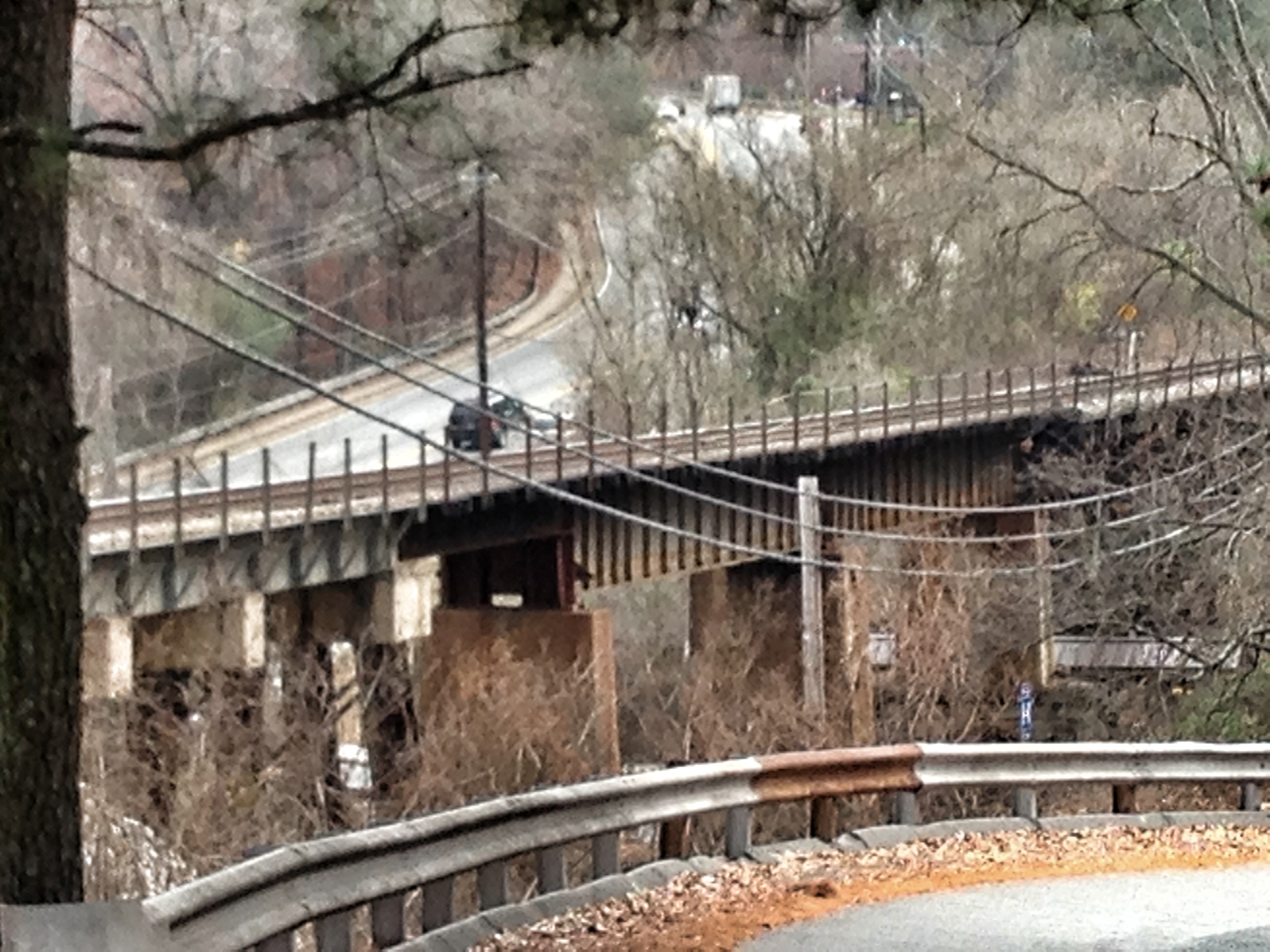
Clifton Corridor rail line parallel to Clifton Road, crossing Old Briarcliff Way just east of Sage Hill

The Clifton Corridor is a proposed public transportation corridor in and near Atlanta, Georgia, roughly connecting the Buckhead, Emory University, and Decatur areas.

== Proposed route ==
The proposed route stretches from:

- Lindbergh Center at the southern end of Buckhead
- Eastwards following the existing CSX rail corridor
- Stations near the CDC, Emory University and Veterans Administration campus
- Possible continuation along the northern edge of Decatur via Suburban Plaza on N. Decatur Rd.
- Terminus at the Avondale MARTA station

MARTA selected light rail as the preferred mode for the corridor in 2012. Emory strongly supports rapid transit in the corridor.

== History ==
A local rail service along the Clifton Corridor was envisioned as early as 1961, when the line was included on maps for a potential regional transportation system.

In March 2012, after considering bus, light rail and heavy rail rapid-transit options, MARTA recommended a light rail option. In Summer 2012, there was a referendum on a 1-cent sales tax (SPLOST) to fund traffic and road improvements. If approved, the tax would have provided $700 million to fund rapid transit along the Clifton Corridor. The measure was defeated by voters.

By the summer of 2018, MARTA updated the Clifton Corridor fact sheet with Alternative 6 shown as the selected routing split into two phases. At that time, MARTA estimated construction of first phase from Lindburgh to North Decatur / Clairmont to begin in 2022 and be complete and operational by 2026. The initial segment was estimated to cost between $900 million to $1.3 billion, with build-out of the full line running $1.8–2.1 billion.

However, as of January 2022 MARTA has not yet allocated funding for construction, which prevents the Federal Transit Administration from allocating matching funds. By February 2023, MARTA had eliminated the light rail option and was proceeding to plan a bus rapid transit line along the corridor.

== Stations ==
MARTA proposed stations at:

- Lindbergh Center
- Cheshire Bridge Road (near Faulkner Road and the Morningside Nature Preserve
- Sage Hill / Briarcliff (near the intersection of Briarcliff Road, Johnson Road, and Zonolite Road)
- CDC/Emory Conference Center
- Emory-Rollins
- Andrews Circle
- North Decatur / Clairmont
- Suburban Plaza
- DeKalb Medical Center
- Irwin Way
- Your Dekalb Farmers Market
- Avondale MARTA station
