= Morningside Nature Preserve =

Nature reserve in Atlanta, Georgia

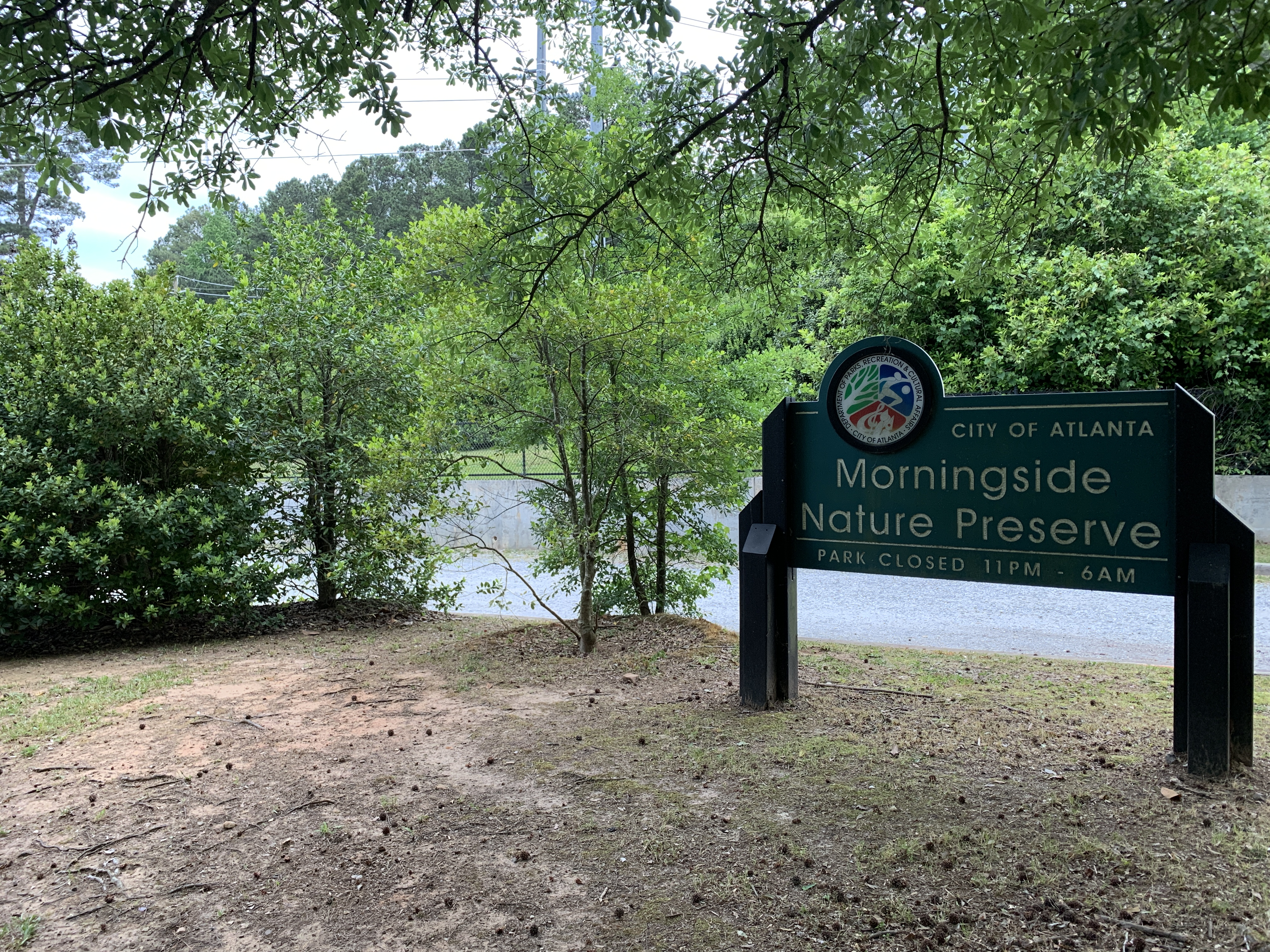
- Entry sign at the Lenox Road trailhead
- Interactive map of Morningside Nature Preserve
- Type: Nature reserve, city park
- Location: Atlanta, Georgia, U.S.
- Coordinates: 33.8069°N 84.35746°W
- Area: 33.1 acres (13.4 ha)
- Opened: January 2001
- Operator: Atlanta Department of Parks and Recreation
- Status: Open all year

Morningside Nature Preserve is a 33.1 acres (13.4 ha) municipal nature reserve located in the Morningside/Lenox Park neighborhood of Atlanta, Georgia. The preserve protects a critical urban woodland and riparian corridor bisected by the South Fork of Peachtree Creek, which plays an essential role in maintaining the water quality of the Chattahoochee River watershed.

== History ==
The property was originally known as the Wildwood Urban Forest. In the late 1990s, the tract of land was purchased by a local residential developer who proposed clear-cutting the forest to construct a single-family housing subdivision. In 1999, neighborhood volunteers organized the Wildwood Urban Forest Committee, led by local residents Rochelle Routman and Susan Robinson, to oppose the development and advocate for the preservation of the acreage.

The community partnered with The Nature Conservancy to negotiate a buyout with the developer. To fund the acquisition, local residents launched a grassroots fundraising campaign that secured $150,000 from approximately 600 individual households. This was matched by a $150,000 grant from the Arthur M. Blank Family Foundation and $300,000 from the Georgia Greenspace Fund. The remaining balance was covered when the Atlanta City Council approved the allocation of $1,336,125 in city park impact funds.

On January 31, 2001, the City of Atlanta's Finance/Executive Committee unanimously approved the purchase of the land from The Nature Conservancy, permanently protecting the forest from development. The property was officially renamed the Morningside Nature Preserve in 2006 to satisfy legal covenants attached to the sale.

The main trailhead on Lenox Road officially opened on December 14, 2009. Its construction required a collaborative compromise involving the city, neighborhood groups, and Georgia Power to mitigate the environmental impact of a nearby power substation, which included securing an easement across property owned by the Morningside Place Homeowners Association.

== Geography and features ==
The reserve consists of approximately two miles of unpaved multi-use trails suitable for hiking, walking, and running. The rolling forest canopy serves as a protected urban sanctuary for native wildlife, including foxes, beavers, turtles, raccoons, and numerous bird species. The trails can be accessed via two primary entry points: the main Lenox Road trailhead and a secondary western entrance on Wellbourne Road.

The eastern and western trail networks are connected by a large wooden suspension bridge spanning the South Fork Peachtree Creek, which was completed in October 2010. The bridge project was managed and co-funded by the PATH Foundation alongside Quality of Life funds provided by the City of Atlanta Department of Parks and Recreation.

Directly beneath the suspension bridge, the creek meanders sharply through the forest, slowing its flow and depositing a wide, sandy sediment bank on the eastern shore. This area is widely known among Atlanta residents by the nickname "Dog Beach," serving as a popular local destination for wading and pet recreation. Per City of Atlanta municipal ordinances, pets must remain leashed throughout the entirety of the preserve.
