= Gallery at South DeKalb =

The Gallery at South DeKalb
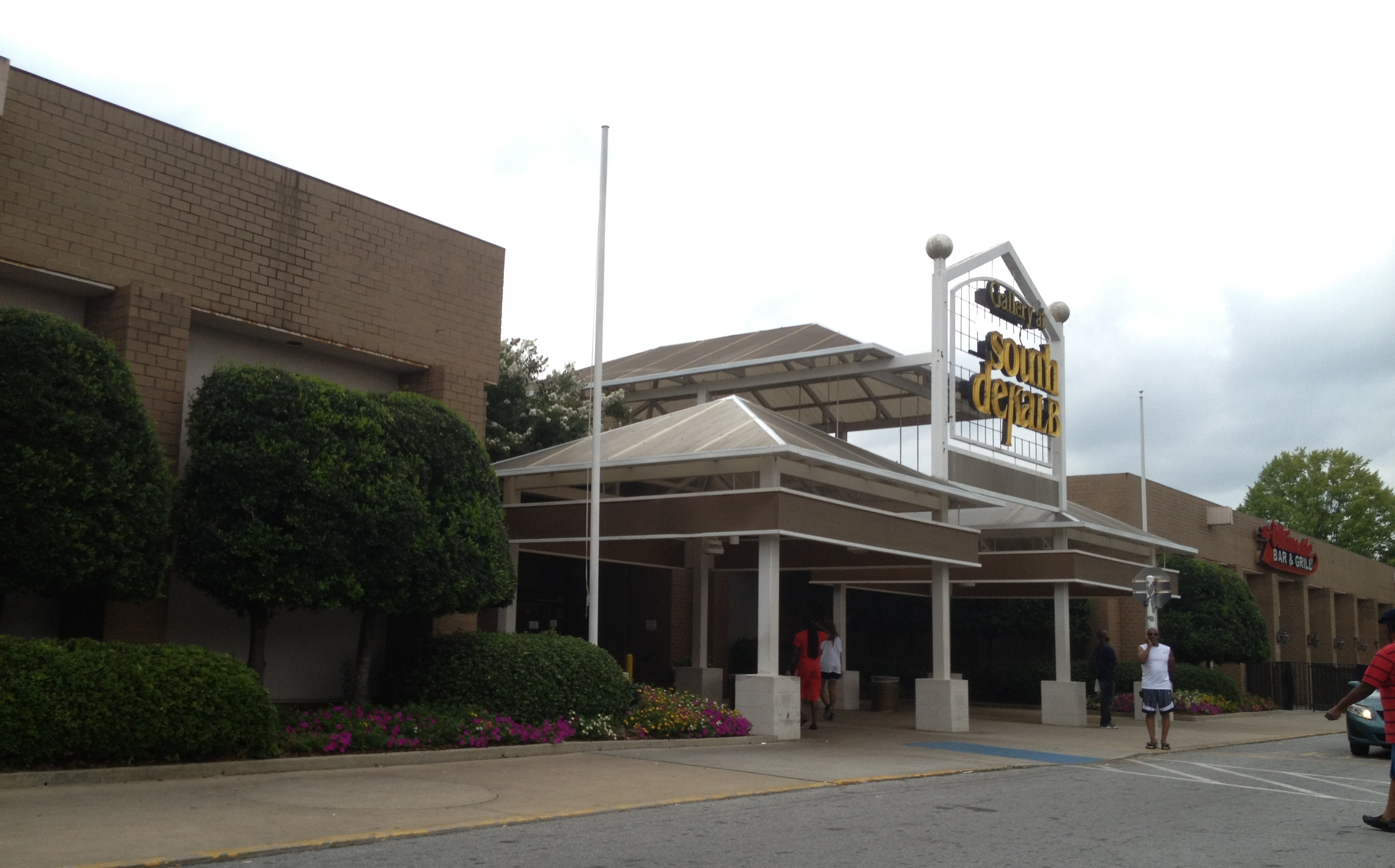
- Entrance to South DeKalb Mall, July 2012
- Location: Decatur, Georgia, United States
- Coordinates: 33°42′31″N 84°16′27″W
- Opened: 1968
- Developer: Fickling and Walker
- Manager: Namdar Realty Group
- Owner: Namdar Realty Group, Mason Asset Management
- Num. of stores: 100+
- Num. of anchor tenants: 3 (2 open, 1 vacant)
- Floor area: 800,000 sq ft (74,000 m^{2})
- Floors: 1, former Macy’s had 3 floors former JCPenney had 2 floors
- Website: galleryatsouthdekalb.com

The Gallery at South DeKalb, formerly South DeKalb Mall, is a shopping mall owned by Namdar Reality Group. The mall is located at the intersection of Candler Road and Interstate 20 in the Panthersville CDP of DeKalb County, Georgia.

== History ==
The mall opened in 1968 with anchors Rich's and JCPenney. This mall also faced competition from the beginning with several other malls in DeKalb County, mainly Northlake Mall. The Rich's also had an automotive center similar to most Sears of the time. During the early 1970s, the mall sported signage and a logo with the words South DeKalb Mall rendered in bas-relief SFIntellivised font, similar to the lettering used in the opening credits of the then-famous Mary Tyler Moore television series, only in the mall's version, accompanied by a bas-relief asterisk placed tightly among the letters of the mall's name. As of 2014, the mall's signage still pays homage to the original font. The modern signage is lighted. The former signage was dark brown and made of metal, and was not.

JCPenney left the mall in 2001 as it relocated to Stonecrest. The space left behind by the anchor has been occupied by a furniture store called Amazing Rooms. The Chick-Fil-A closed at the end of January 2012.

South DeKalb Mall became known as "The Gallery at South DeKalb" partly reflecting its new owners ideas to change the image of the mall. At the time the mall's anchor stores were Macy's (formerly Rich's), Amazing Rooms, and American Screen Works has built a 14-screen movie theater with stadium seating and an entertaining jazz lounge. The mall also has a Piccadilly Cafeteria and a small office center behind the mall.

American Scream Works would close in 2015 but was reopened by Satellite Cinemas on April 22, 2016. It was closed in 2017 permanently.

On January 7, 2020, it was announced that Macy's would close, as part of a plan to close 125 stores nationwide. The store closed on March 17, 2020.

As of 2026, Chapel Beauty currently operates out of the former JCPenney.

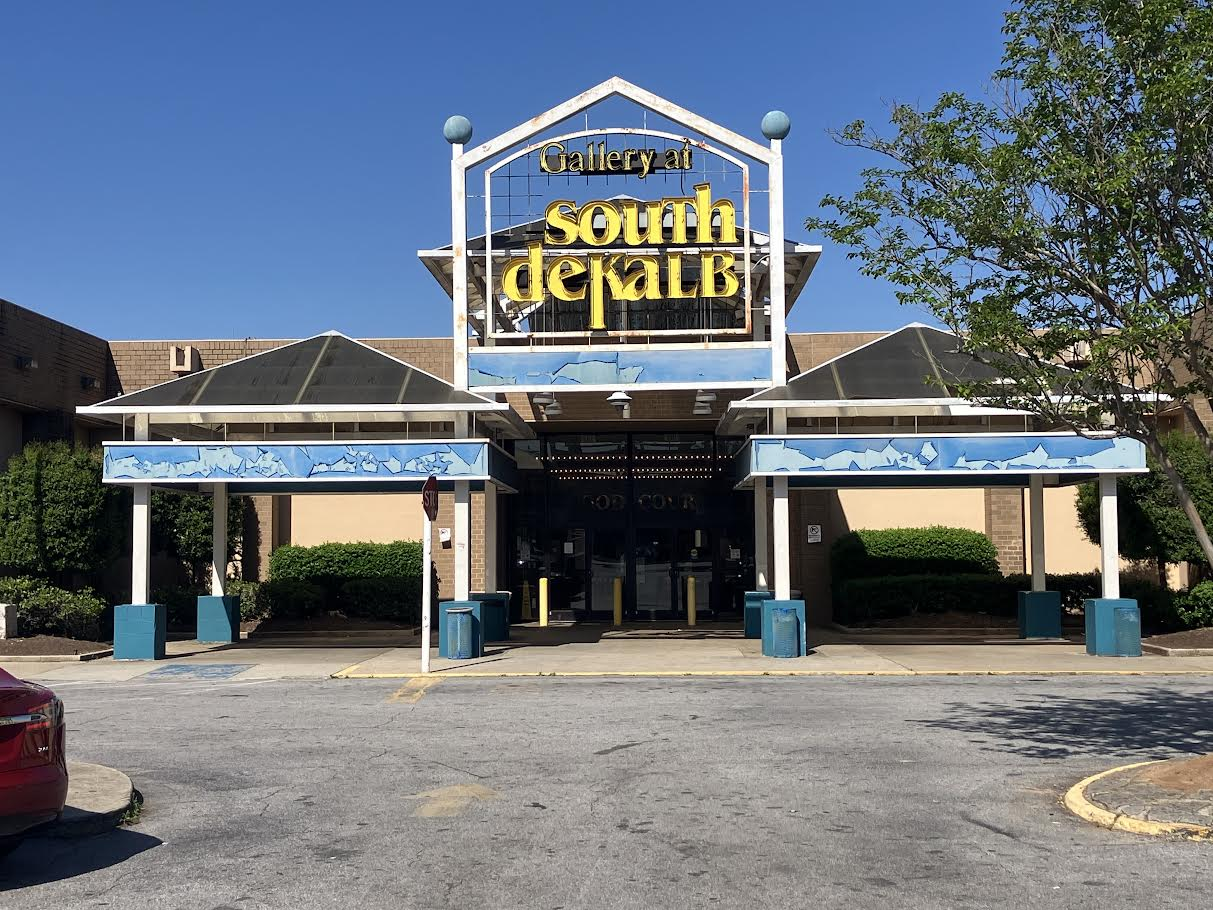
Entrance (April 2025)
