= Hamilton E. Holmes station =

MARTA rail station

W5 Hamilton E. Holmes
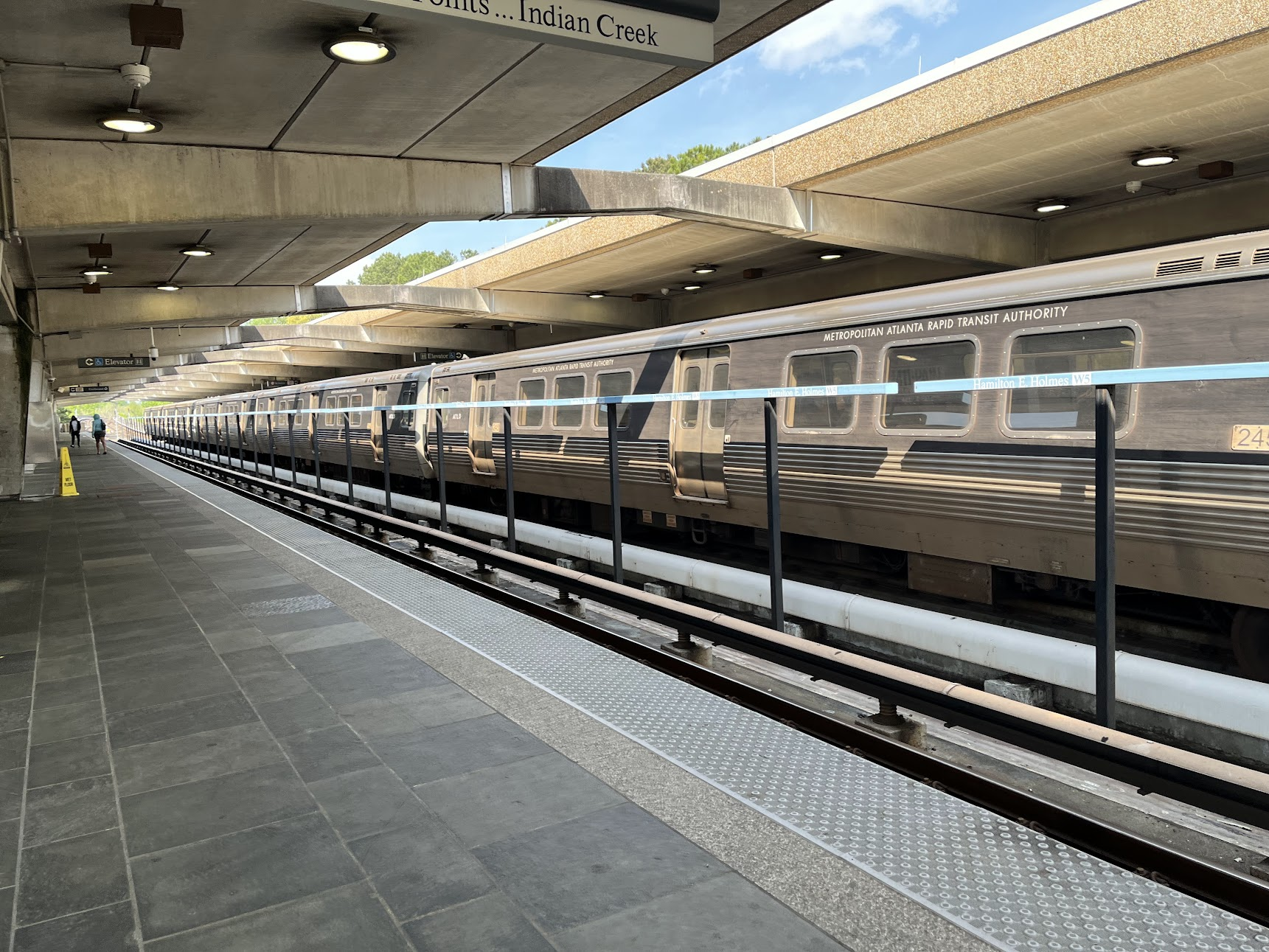
- An out of service train sitting at the station

General information
- Location: 70 Hamilton E. Holmes Drive NW; Atlanta, GA 30311
- Coordinates: 33.754638°N 84.46794°W
- Owner: Metropolitan Atlanta Rapid Transit Agency
- Platforms: 2 side platforms
- Tracks: 2
- Connections: MARTA Bus: 3, 51, 60, 66, 68, 73, 153, 165, 201, 850, 856, 865, 867; CobbLinc: 25, 30

Construction
- Structure type: elevated
- Parking: 1,436 spaces
- Cycle facilities: 10 bike racks
- Accessible: YES

Other information
- Station code: W5

History
- Opened: December 22, 1979; 46 years ago
- Former names: Hightower (1979–1997)

Passengers
- 2007: 10,600 (daily) 0%

Services
Preceding station	MARTA	Following station
Terminus	Blue Line	West Lake toward Indian Creek
Location

Hamilton E. Holmes, also known as H.E. Holmes, is a subway station in Atlanta, Georgia, the western terminus for the Blue Line in the Metropolitan Atlanta Rapid Transit Authority (MARTA) rail system. This is one of the busiest stations in the MARTA system, handling an average of 22,000 boardings per weekday. When the station opened in 1979 it was originally named Hightower station after Hightower Road (Georgia 280), but both the road and the station were later renamed to honor civil rights movement hero Hamilton E. Holmes.

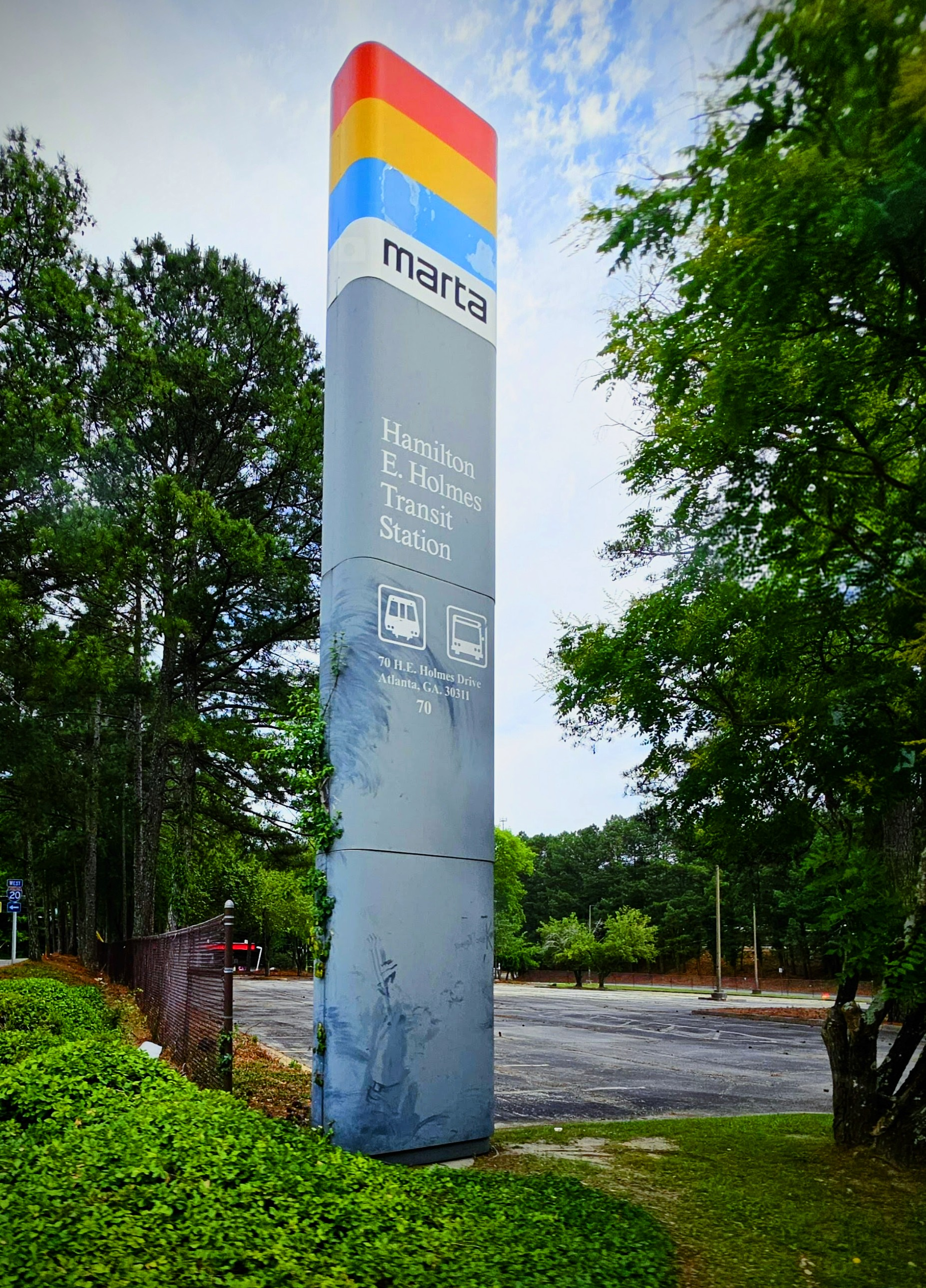
Hamilton E Holmes station sign

The station primarily serves areas near the junction of Interstate 20 and Georgia 280 east of Adamsville.

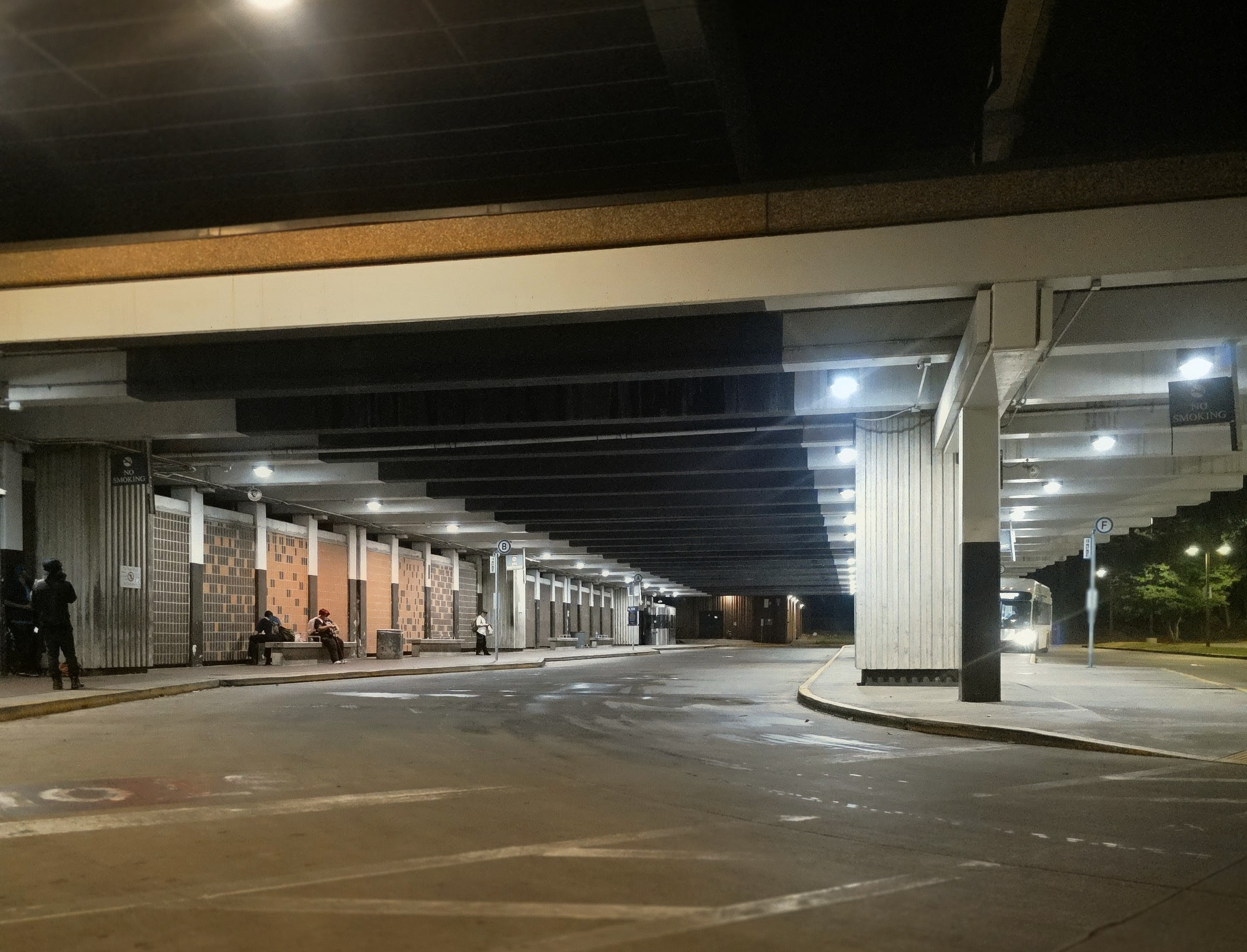
Station Bus Bay area.

== Station layout ==
P Platform level	Side platform, doors will open on the right
P Platform level	Westbound	← Blue Line alighting passengers only
P Platform level	Eastbound	Blue Line toward Indian Creek (West Lake) →
P Platform level	Side platform, doors will open on the left, right
G	Street Level	Exit/Entrance, station house

== Attractions ==
- Frederick Douglass High School
- Benjamin E. Mays High School
- Six Flags Over Georgia
- Greenbriar Mall

== Bus service ==
The station is served by the following MARTA bus routes

- Route 1 - Joseph E Boone Boulevard
- Route 3- Boulder Park Drive
- Route 66 - Lynhurst Drive / Princeton Lakes
- Route 68 - Benjamin E. Mays Drive
- Route 73 - Fulton Industrial Boulevard
- Route 153 - James Jackson Parkway
- Route 165 - Fairburn Road / Barge Road park/ride
- Route 850 - Carroll Heights / Fairburn Heights
- Route 856 - Baker Hills / Wilson Mill Meadows
- Route 867 - Harlan Road / Peyton Forest / Dixie Hills

The station is also served by the following CobbLinc bus routes:

- Route 25 - Hurt Road / Old Alabama Road
- Route 30 - Austell Road / Floyd Road
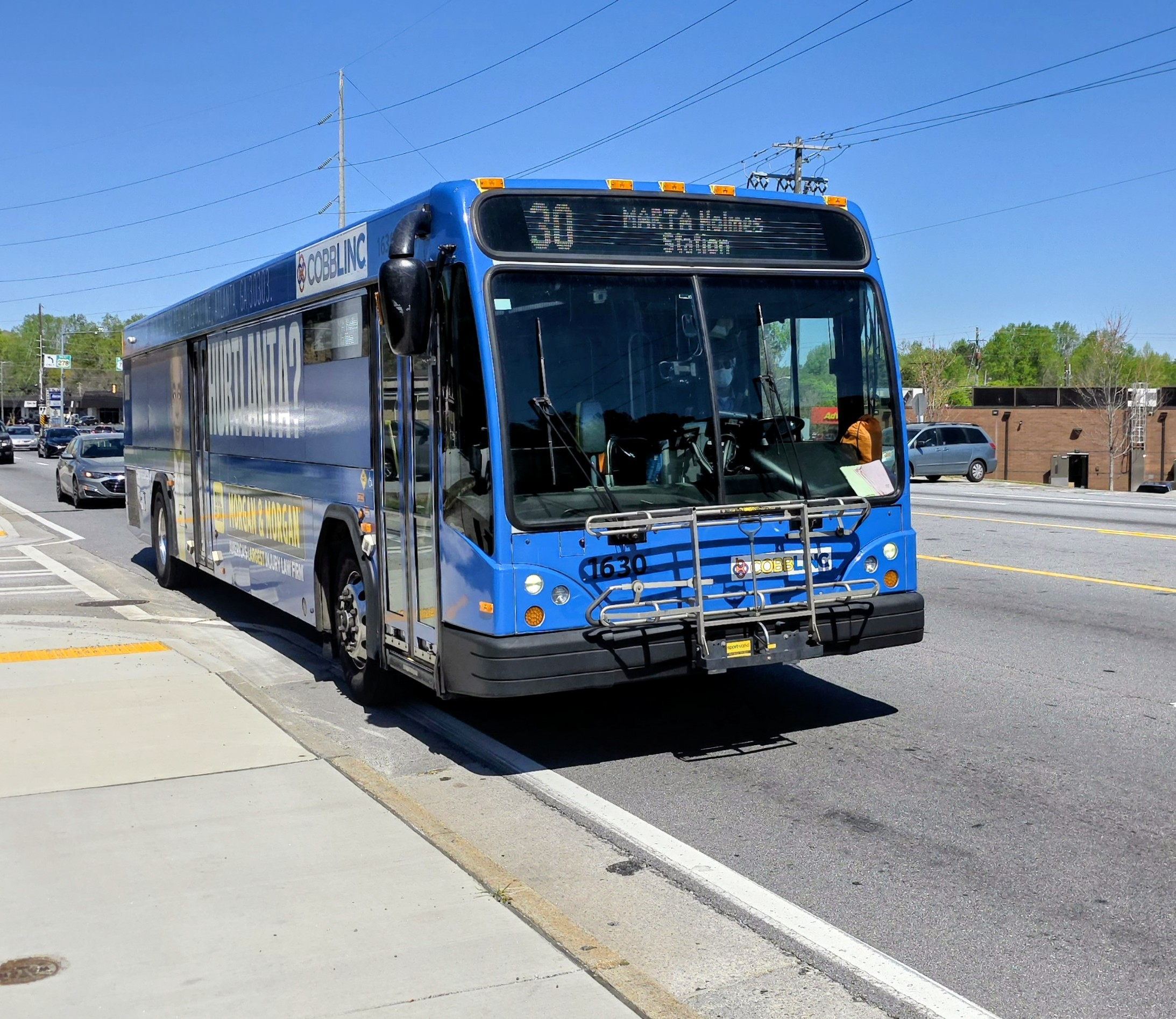
- Cobblinc to route 30 to Hamilton E Holmes station

== See also ==
- Cecil B. Moore station, a train station named after a civil rights leader Cecil B. Moore
- Martin Luther King station, a list of stations named after civil rights leader Martin Luther King Jr.
