= Arabia Mountain Path =

Hiking trail in Georgia, United States

Coordinates: 33°39′53.9″N 84°07′59.4″W

Arabia Mountain Path (AMP)

Arabia Mountain Path
- Length: 30+ miles
- Location: DeKalb, Henry, and Rockdale Counties, Georgia
- Established: 2006
- Use: Hiking, Cycling, Jogging, Skating, etc.
- Difficulty: Moderate
- Surface: Paved
- Website: http://pathfoundation.org/trails/arabia-mountain/

The Arabia Mountain Path (AMP) is a paved biking and hiking trail connecting sites within the Arabia Mountain National Heritage Area, Georgia, United States, built by the PATH Foundation. The trail covers more than 30 linear miles and features hills, sections of boardwalk, a serpentine bridge, and access to 13 free trail head parking areas. The AMP connects a number of visitor destinations and recreational areas including Panola Mountain State Park, the Monastery of the Holy Spirit, Davidson-Arabia Mountain Nature Preserve, the Mall at Stonecrest, and historic Lithonia, Georgia.

The AMP was designed to hug the landscape and connect various historical, ecological, and cultural landscapes within the Arabia Mountain National Heritage Area. Visitors to the trail will see diverse scenery including historic barns, lakes, unique plant life, and granite outcrops.

== History ==
Although there is little historical evidence about what existed in the lands currently traversed by the AMP, by the time of Anglo-American settlement in the early 19th century, the area was sparsely populated by Creek and Cherokee Tribes. it is believed that the area was a buffer between the two nations, used as a trade and transportation corridor. The land was ceded to the State of Georgia by the Creeks in 1821. The land was then distributed to settlers via the Georgia Land Lotteries. Throughout the rest of the 19th and most of the 20th centuries, the area remained very sparsely populated, with many of the roads remaining unpaved until the mid-1900s. Although the AMP is not a "rails to trails" project, there was a railroad that ran from Atlanta to Augusta that ran through the area, near the present day location of the trail. This railroad helped to support Lithonia's quarrying industry, fed by the granite gneiss of Arabia Mountain. Otherwise, the surrounding land was used for small-scale farming. Small settlements developed along crossroads, the South River (Ocmulgee River), and railroad.

The proximity of the trail and surrounding area to Atlanta, the second fastest-growing metropolitan area in the country during the 2000s leaves it vulnerable to overdevelopment. The area is now protected by the Arabia Mountain National Heritage Area and serves as a natural haven only 20 minutes away from the city.

Funding for the AMP was provided by the PATH Foundation, GADOT Transportation Enhancement Grants, and Georgia State Parks.

== Sites along the AMP ==
National Historic District of Lithonia: Lithonia, Georgia meaning "place of stone" features many historic buildings constructed from the locally quarried "Tidal Grey" granite of nearby Arabia Mountain. The city was just a crossroads until the Georgia Railroad arrived in 1845, linking Lithonia with Augusta and Atlanta. The city was incorporated in 1856, when the original town boundaries reached only one mile from the railroad station. The historic town center is currently the northernmost point on the AMP.

Vaughters Farm: This historic farmhouse and barn are part of the last remaining dairy landscape in DeKalb County, Georgia, a county that once was filled with dairy farms. S.B. Vaughters purchased the 144 acres in 1946. With the help of a seventh-grade student, he completed the granite farmhouse and barn across Klondike Road by 1947. Vaughters raised dairy and beef cattle on this farm through the 1980s, making it the last operational dairy farm in DeKalb County. The farm is currently a part of Panola Mountain State Park and has been rehabilitated to serve as the headquarters for the Arabia Mountain Heritage Area Alliance.

Horace King Commemorative Covered Bridge: The covered bridge over Stephenson Creek was created by the PATH foundation in 2004, honoring the lattice truss construction used by Horace King, a former slave and one of the most prominent 19th-century bridge architects in the American South, and also served in the Alabama State House.

Evans Mill Ruins: Just off the trail head parking lot are the ruins of a dam and millrace that was located on the Pole Bridge Creek. The Evans Family took advantage of the drop in elevation on the creek to grind wheat and corn without motors. The mill was in operation until the 1940s.

Historic District of Klondike: This historic district was listed on the National Register of Historic Places in 2007. The district includes granite commercial buildings as well as several antebellum homes. It is accessible on the path east of the Horace King Commemorative Bridge.

Flat Rock Community: Flat Rock is the oldest African American settlement in DeKalb County, beginning as an agricultural community bound by the large South, Lyon, and Johnson farms. After emancipation, many former slaves stayed in the area, building schools, churches, and civic organizations. The community remained intact through The Great Migration and is the site of Flat Rock Archives and a historic cemetery.

== Use ==
The Arabia Mountain Path is open seven days a week from dawn to dusk. All non-motorized wheeled vehicles are permitted, with the exception of motorized wheelchairs, which are also permitted on the trail. Pets are also permitted.
