= Arabia Mountain =

Mountain in Georgia, United States of America

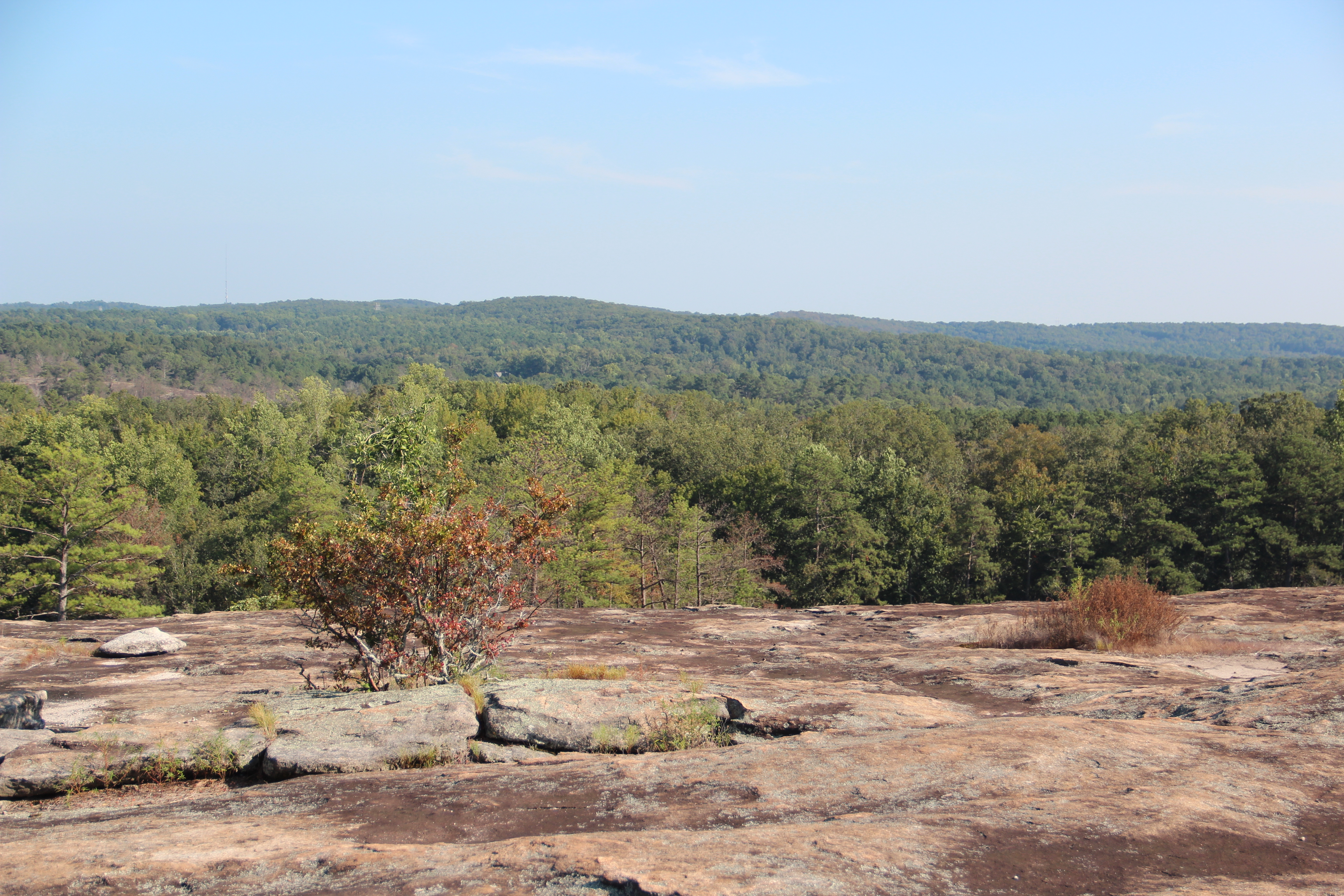
- View from the summit of Arabia Mountain

Highest point
- Elevation: 955 ft (291 m)
- Prominence: 172 ft (52 m)
- Coordinates: 33°39′54″N 84°7′6″W

Geography
- Location: DeKalb County, Georgia

Climbing
- First ascent: unknown
- Easiest route: Hike
Arabia Mountain National Heritage Area
- IUCN category III (natural monument or feature)
- Location within Georgia Location within the United States
- Location: Southeast of Atlanta, Georgia
- Nearest city: Lithonia, Georgia
- Coordinates: 33°39′54″N 84°7′6″W
- Established: 2006
- Governing body: Arabia Mountain Heritage Area Alliance

Arabia Mountain, a part of Arabia Mountain National Heritage Area, is the northern of two peaks in the Davidson-Arabia Mountain Nature Preserve, in DeKalb County, Georgia. A low saddle separates it from Bradley Mountain, several hundred feet to its south. The two form a monadnock. The peak is 955 feet (290 m) above sea level, rising 172 feet (52 m) above Arabia Lake reservoir. Bradley Mountain is closer to the visitor trails than Arabia Mountain and is often misidentified by visitors as Arabia Mountain.

The mountain is in a namesake National Heritage Area that encompasses natural, cultural, and historical elements to form a cohesive, nationally significant landscape. The area is due east of Atlanta and spans 40,000 acres (16,000 ha) reaching from the historic commercial center of Lithonia to the Monastery of the Holy Spirit in Conyers, including several sites in between, including Panola Mountain, Davidson-Arabia Mountain Nature Preserve, and the historic Flat Rock Community with the Flat Rock Archives. The National Heritage Area was established in 2006 and is coordinated by the Arabia Mountain National Heritage Area Alliance, which includes board members, representatives from the community and local organizations, and staff.

Davidson-Arabia Mountain Nature Preserve includes 2,550 acres with a multi-use bike path, hiking trails, and lakes for fishing. The park features large exposed granite formations, wetlands, pine forest, oak forest, streams habitat and two lakes. Plant species include the rare red diamorpha in the winter and yellow daisies in the fall. The area includes abandoned rock quarries and structures from the mining operations.

== History ==
Although there is little historical evidence about what existed in the lands that currently make up the National Heritage Area, by the time of Anglo-American settlement in the early 19th century, the area was sparsely populated by Muscogee (Creek) and Cherokee tribes. It is believed that the area was a buffer between the two nations, used as a trade and transportation corridor. The land was ceded to the state of Georgia by the Muscogee in 1821. The land was then distributed to settlers via the Georgia Land Lotteries. Throughout the rest of the 19th and most of the 20th centuries, the area remained very sparsely populated, with many of the roads remaining unpaved until the 1950s.

The existence of the Atlanta Augusta Railroad allowed the granite quarry industry in the area to flourish in the late 1800s. This railroad supported Lithonia's quarry industry, which was fed by the granite gneiss of numerous area quarries, including Arabia Mountain. Remnants of this industry can be seen throughout the Heritage Area in the form of quarry office ruins, rock ledges, and drill holes on the rock. Much of the surrounding land was used for small-scale farming. The remains of the agricultural landscape are still visible in the National Heritage Area, including at the Lyon Farm, Vaughters Farm, and Parker House. Small settlements developed along crossroads, the South River (Upper Ocmulgee River), and the railroad, such as the Klondike National Historic District, Flat Rock community, and downtown Lithonia.

Like Stone Mountain, Arabia Mountain was quarried for decades before the property was turned over to the DeKalb park system. Structures and excavations from the quarry operations can be seen throughout the park. The stone quarried from Arabia Mountain, officially called "Tidal Grey", was prized for its high structural density and compressive strength as well as its "swirl" pattern. Tidal Grey Arabia Mountain can be seen in the construction of buildings for the U.S. Naval Academy, the Brooklyn Bridge, and street curbing in Atlanta as well as many other Georgia cities. Prior to 1880, the stone was hand quarried, but starting in 1879 workers used drills, dynamite and air compressors to "raise a ledge" or sever a large block of stone from the mass. That allowed more control over the size of the stone, and large stones could be used for dimensional or building construction. The proximity to the railroad meant that the Tidal Grey could be easily transported across the country. In 1949, the Lithonia district produced nearly 1.5 million tons of granite valued at the time at $3 million.

Another advancement to the quarrying industry at Arabia Mountain was the discovery that adding granite grit to chicken feed helped with the birds' digestion. The Davidson family, which owned several quarries in the area, became the largest supplier of poultry grit in the world. They claimed that the sparkling particles of mica in the Stonemo grit attracted the eye and helped the chicken's gizzard break down food. The company was so successful in distributing their feed additive, a Time magazine article from 1941 reported the U.S. government allowed them to continue to operate during World War 2 in the name of national defense.

=== Preservation ===
In the 1970s, the Davidson family donated over 500 acres including Arabia Mountain and surrounding lands to DeKalb County as a nature preserve for local residents to enjoy. Since then, the Davidson-Arabia Mountain Nature Preserve has been expanded several times and now includes 2,550 acres, several granite outcrops and two lakes.

On October 12, 2006, the mountain and Davidson-Arabia Mountain Nature Preserve were designated as nationally significant as a part of the Arabia Mountain National Heritage Area in recognition of its cultural, historical and natural features.

The proximity to Atlanta, the second fastest-growing metropolitan area in the country during the 2000s, leaves it vulnerable to overdevelopment. This threat of encroaching sprawl was recognized after nearly a decade, as the area was determined to be a significant part of national history and earned congressional designation as a National Heritage Area in 2006. The Arabia Mountain purchase was initiated by DeKalb County Chief Executive Officer Vernon Jones. Jones recognized the need for additional parks and the importance of preservation of greenspace. He spearheaded a $125 million bond referendum in his first two months in office. In a special election, it passed overwhelmingly by the citizens of DeKalb County. The initial purchase was a 900 acre track that included Arabia Mountain. Additional joining acreage was acquired, creating a haven for the protection of natural wildlife, and resources. The Jones administration continued its efforts and collaborated with Congresswoman Denise Majette, Congressman Jack Kingston, and Senator Saxsby Chambliss in passage in both houses federal legislation authorizing and declaring Arabia Mountain a national heritage area.

The PATH Foundation has completed more than 30 miles of a 12-foot-wide (3.7 m) concrete road for pedestrian and bicycle use running from downtown Lithonia to Stonecrest Mall and thence through the Davidson-Arabia Mountain Nature Preserve to Panola Mountain State Park, ending at the Monastery of the Holy Spirit in Conyers. This includes a spur to a parking area on Klondike Road and a spur to the DeKalb County School System's Murphey Candler Elementary School and Arabia Mountain High School.

== Geology ==
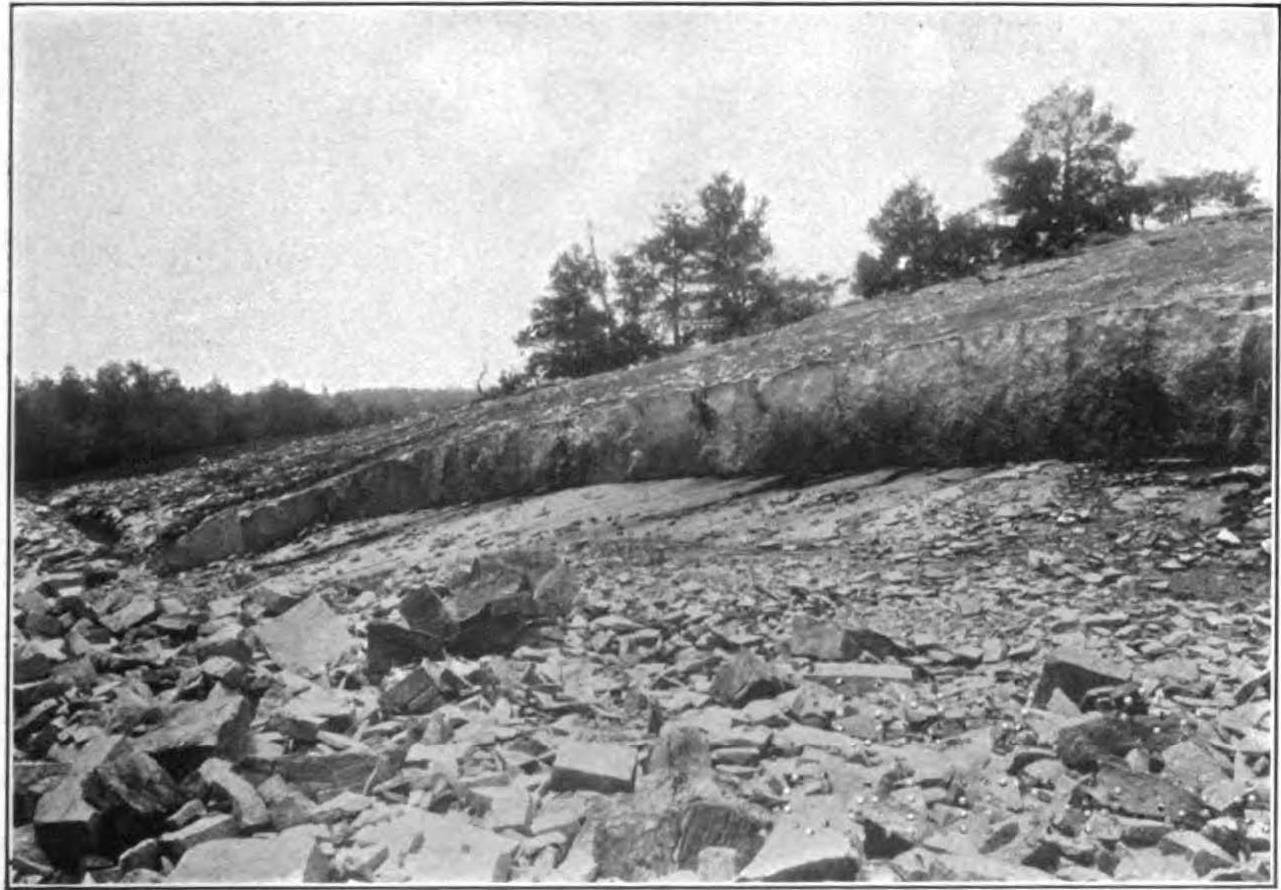
A quarry at Arabia Mountain, c. 1910

The defining feature that gives the area its significance at the national level is its granite outcroppings, called monadnocks. These monadnocks are composed of a granitoid rock and are interspersed with islands of plant life. The Metro-Atlanta area has multiple monadnocks, including Stone Mountain, Arabia Mountain and Panola Mountain. Arabia and Panola Mountains are located within the heritage area.

The monadnocks were formed when erosion-resistant rock was exposed after softer rock eroded over time. The individual characteristics of the monadnock are determined by the individual processes that form the granite. For example, Arabia Mountain features a unique "swirl" pattern because the heat and pressure caused the rock to have a taffy-like consistency when it was cooling over 400 million years ago. Bands of different minerals folded and twisted, creating the "tidal swirl" pattern seen today . By contrast, Panola Mountain has a flakier rock with less compressive strength because of differences in cooling rates. Panola Mountain also has a darker colored rock and different mineral grains. Differences in mineral composition between Panola and Stone Mountains indicated different magma sources at the time of formation.

Arabia Mountain appears to be composed of granite. Although made of metamorphic rock, the mountain is actually composed of migmatite, metamorphosed at higher temperatures than gneiss but not sufficiently melted to become granite. The resulting swirl pattern made the rock a popular building stone and many buildings in the region were constructed with stone quarried from the Lithonia district quarries.

== Botany ==
The seemingly barren landscape of Arabia Mountain is teeming with plant life specially adapted to live in the mountain's harsh environment. Arabia Mountain is one of five locations in the U.S. where black-spored quillwort (Isoetes melanospora) is found. It is one of 44 locations in the U.S. where little amphianthus (Amphianthus pusillus) is found. These are endangered species protected by Georgia and federal law. The largest and most important population of black-spored quillwort and one of the largest Amphianthus populations occur here. The U.S. Fish and Wildlife Service's five-year review of these species, completed in 2008, states "enforcement to protect sensitive areas needs improvement" in the Arabia Mountain area."

Arabia Mountain is one of a small number of locations in the southeastern United States where Small's stonecrop (Sedum smallii, syn. Diamorpha smallii) thrives (this plant is not listed as an endangered species in Georgia or the U.S. but is in Tennessee). When granite and similar stone outcrops are exposed to erosion, over time, small depressions called solution pools form where weaker rock wears away faster than surrounding rock (often assisted by lichen). Over time, these depressions fill with sand washed down from higher locations, which accumulates a small amount of organic content from decaying dead leaves and other detritus, as well as rain water. Small's stonecrop then takes hold in these sandy hollows.

It took thousands of years for plants and trees to grow in the granite outcroppings. The first plants on the mountains were lichens, which draw nutrients from dust and rainwater. Acids from these lichens and mosses gradually formed pits in the rock, called chemical erosion. This allowed shallow amounts of soil to accumulate, providing a place for more plant life to take root. This process is called primary succession as a succession of plants colonize the rock from lichen, to mosses, to diamorpha and larger plants, then gradually accumulating enough soil to support shrubs and trees. Not only does plant matter such as moss erode the rock and help to build soil levels in the pits, but the stone is also weathered by non-chemical factors. Wind, freeze-thaw cycles, and even lightning strikes cause the rock to fragment and break down. Cracks can form, giving another foothold to plant life, and the rock is broken into particles that add to the shallow soil. With the variety of ecosystems within the heritage area, the "edge effect" allows for greater biodiversity where two or more ecosystems intersect. For example, where the rock outcroppings border forests, the shallow soil retains more moisture from runoff and can support the species of both the rock outcropping and the forest.

== Gallery ==
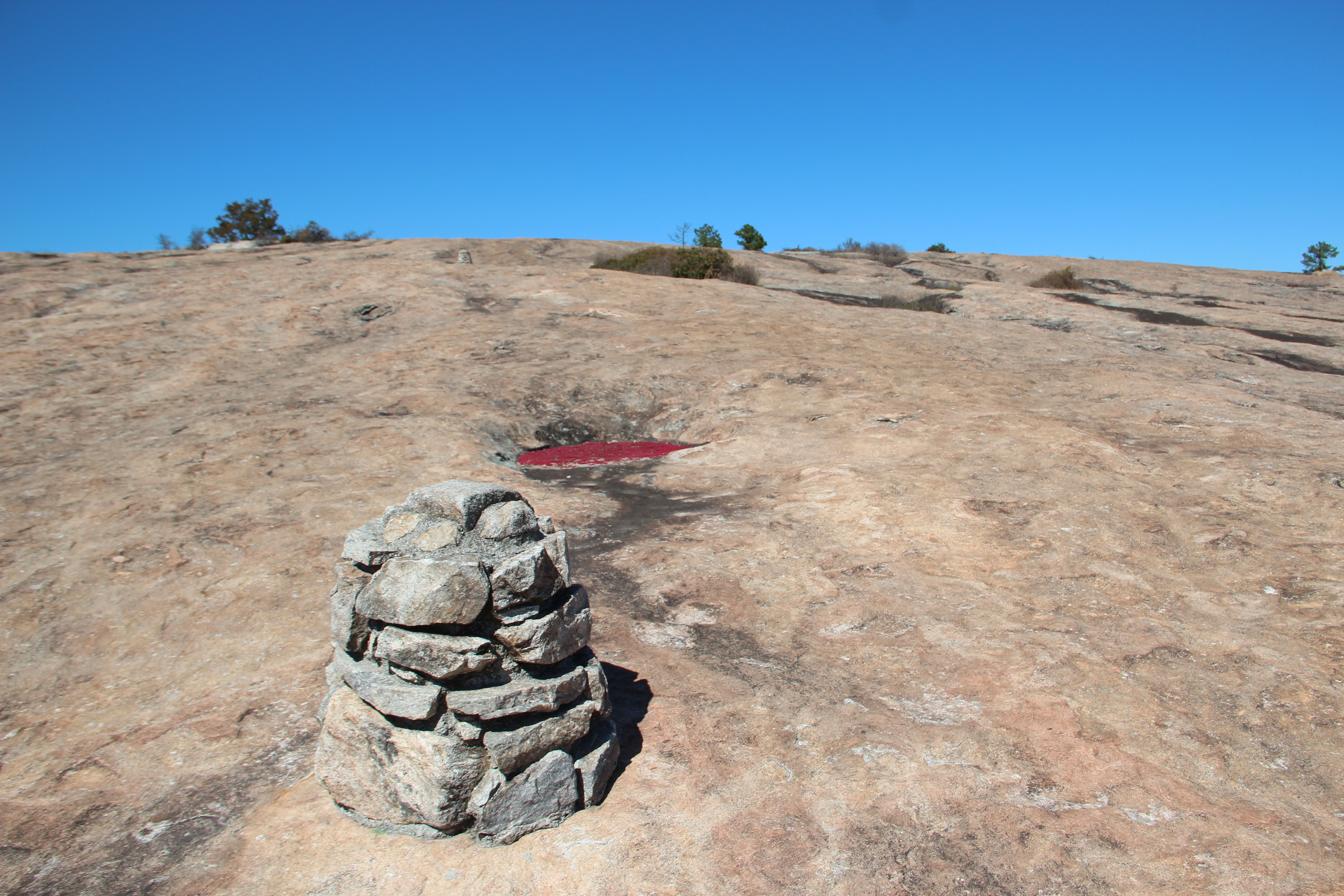
Cairn on Arabia Mountain

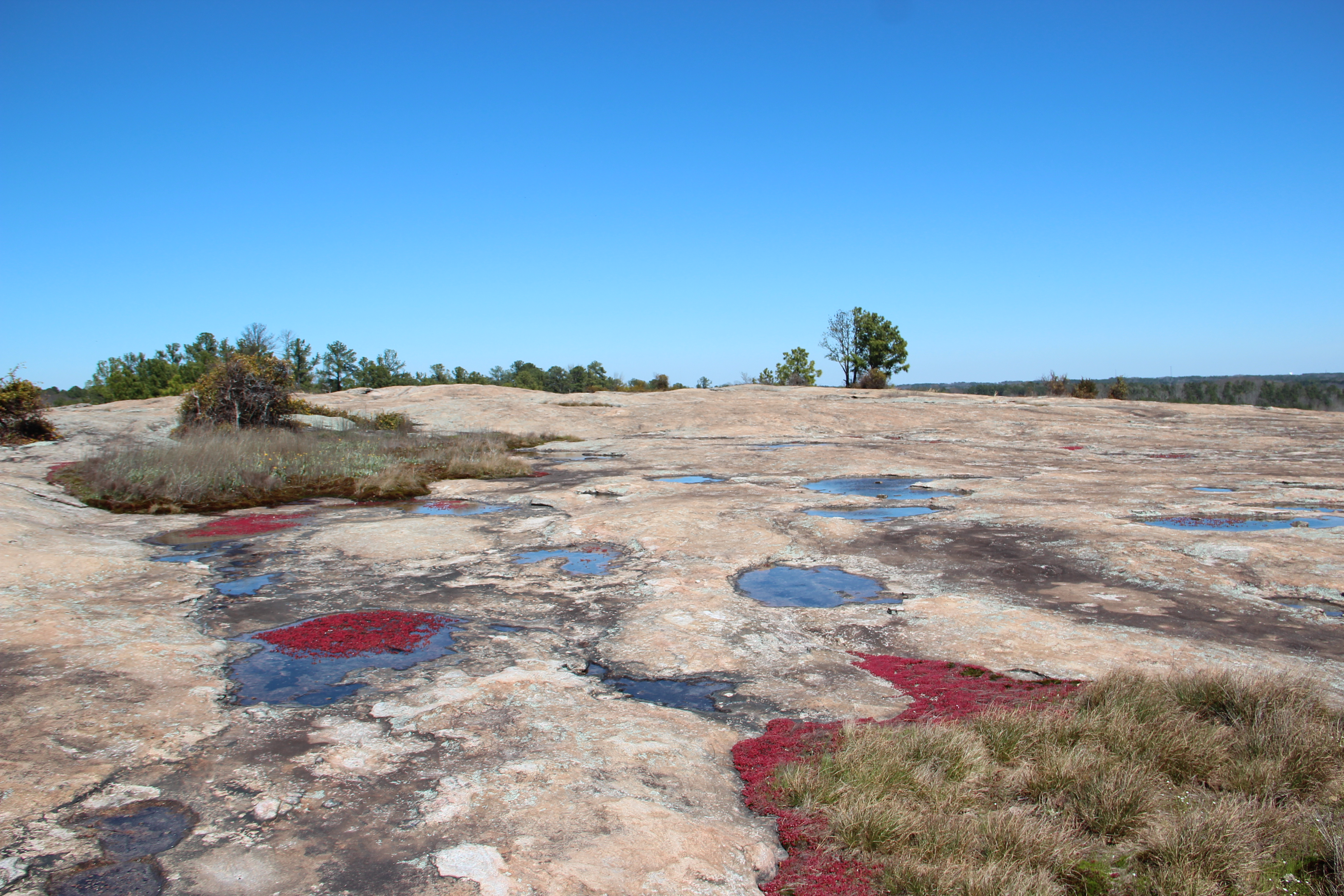
Arabia Mountain

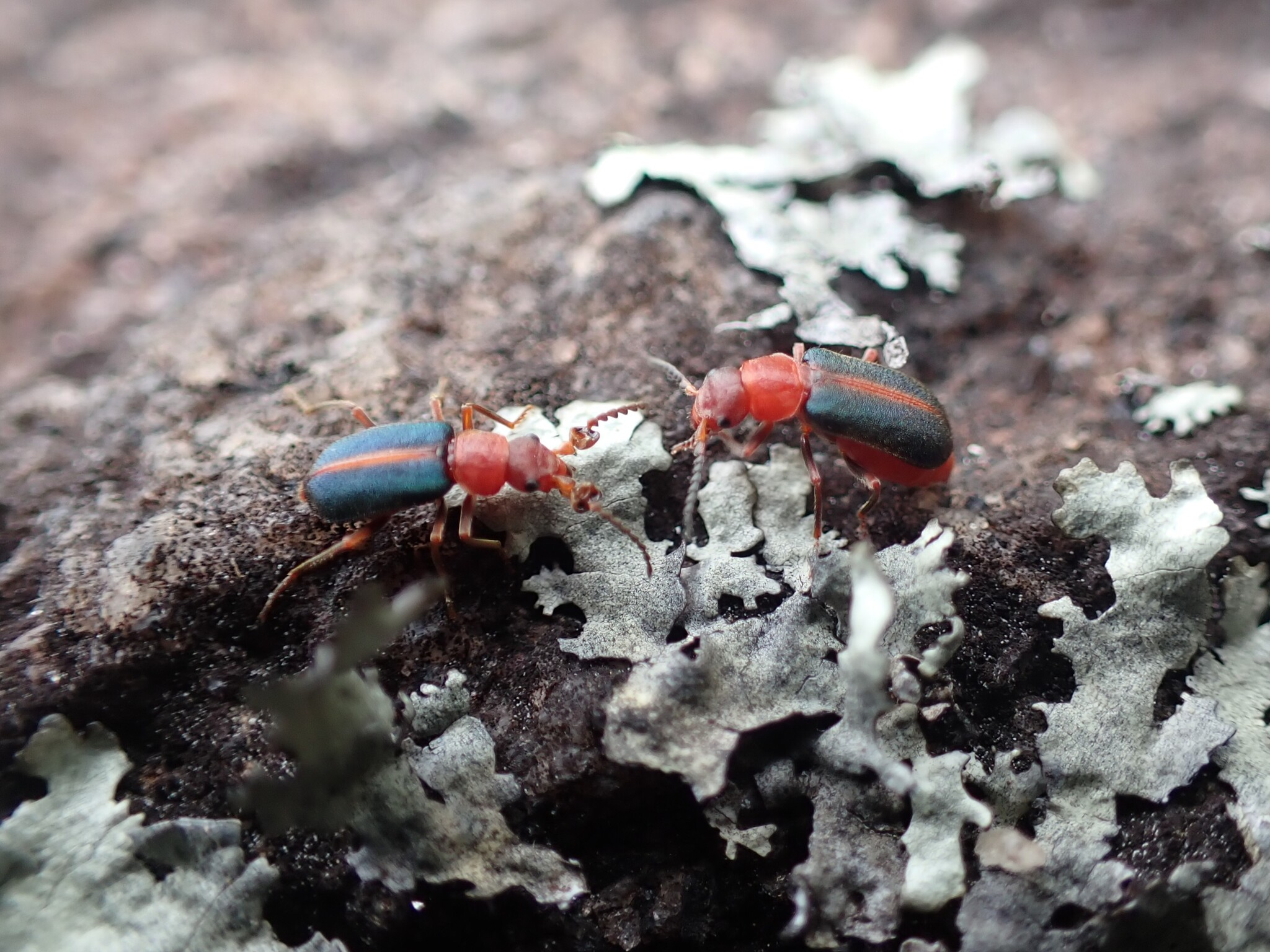
Collops georgianus on Arabia Mountain (endemic to such outcrops in Georgia)

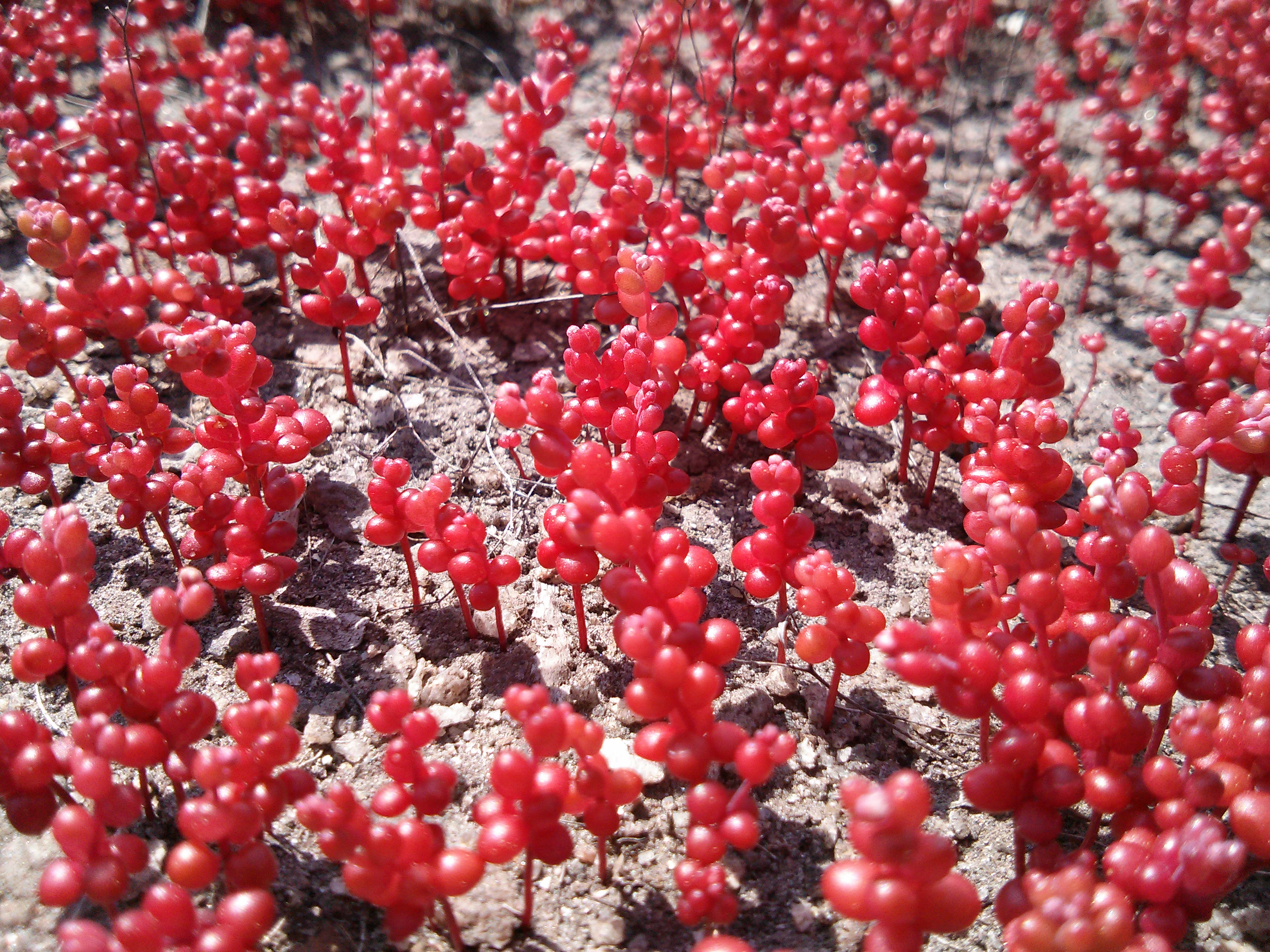
Sedum smallii (red diamorpha) on Arabia Mountain

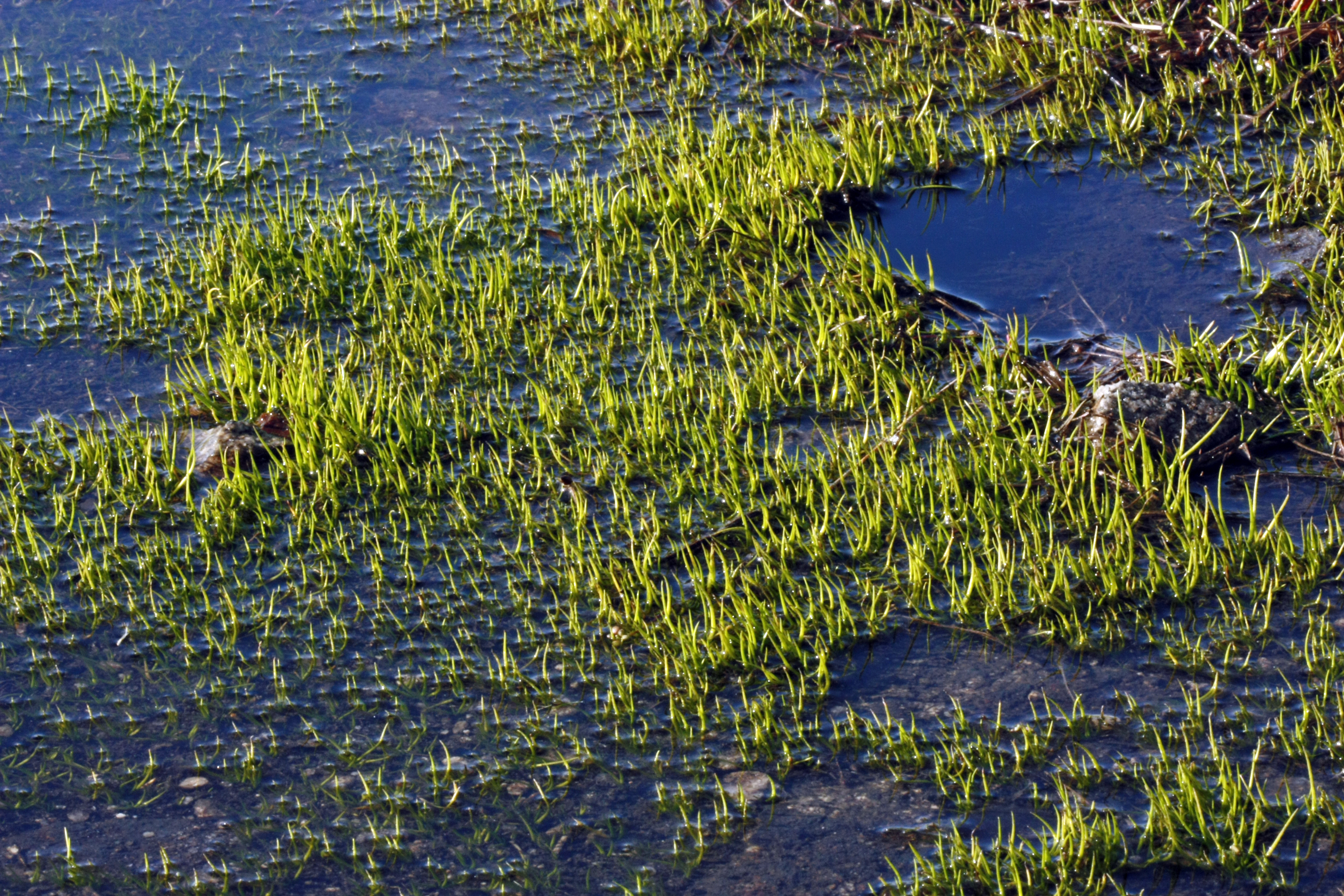
Colony of black-spored quillwort (Isoetes melanospora) in a granite pool on top of Arabia Mountain

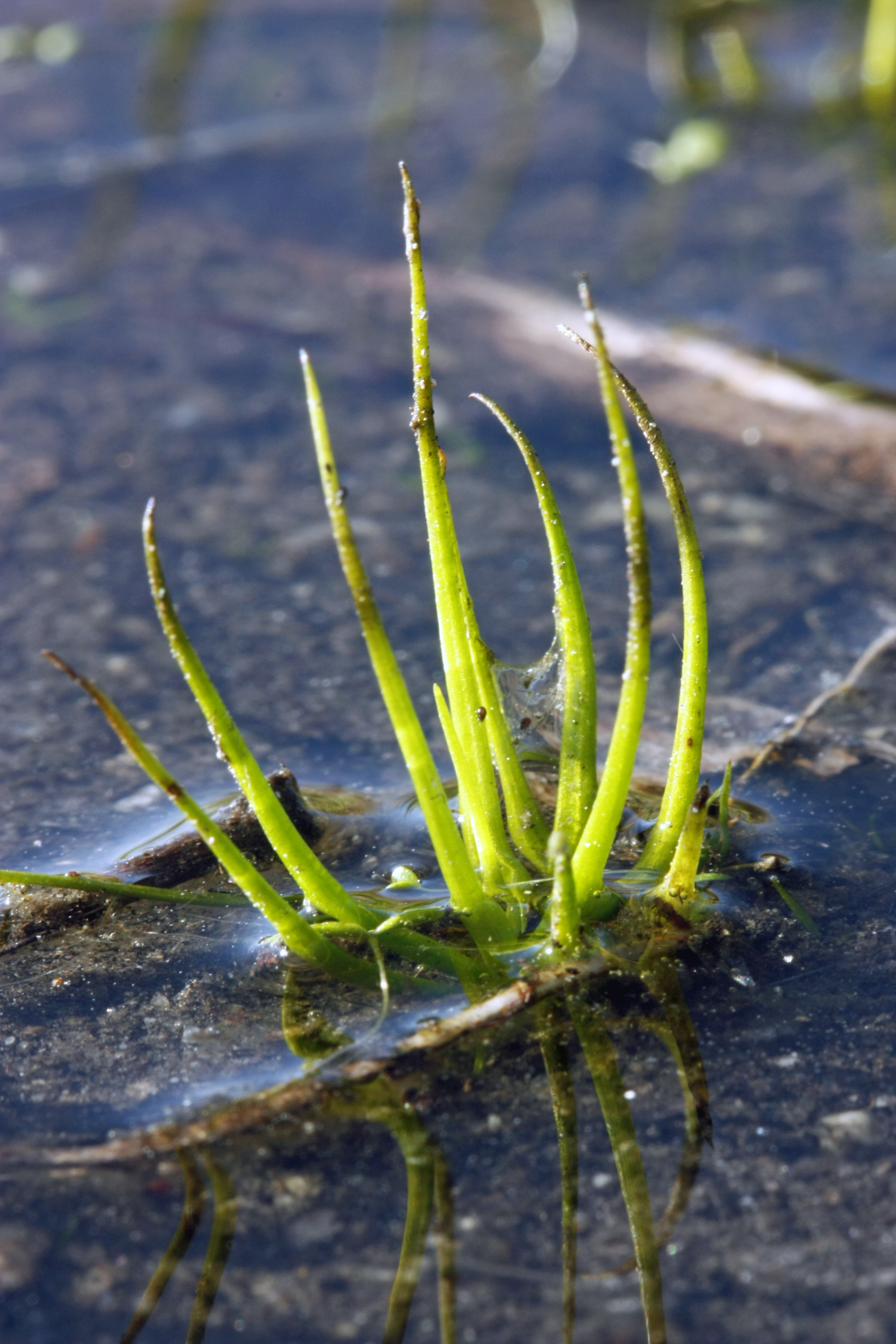
Closeup photograph of black-spored quillwort
