= Chandler Martin =

American football player (born 2002)

No. 55 – New York Giants
- Position: Linebacker
- Roster status: Practice squad

Personal information
- Born: December 11, 2002 (age 23); Lithonia, Georgia, U.S.
- Listed height: 6 ft 0 in (1.83 m)
- Listed weight: 229 lb (104 kg)

Career information
- High school: Arabia Mountain (Stonecrest, Georgia)
- College: East Tennessee State (2020–2022); Memphis (2023–2024)
- NFL draft: 2025: undrafted

Career history
- Baltimore Ravens (2025); Philadelphia Eagles (2026)*; New York Giants (2026–present)*
- * Offseason or practice squad member only

Awards and highlights
- 2× First-team All-AAC (2023, 2024)

Career NFL statistics
- Games played: 3
- Stats at Pro Football Reference

Chandler Martin (born December 11, 2002) is an American professional football linebacker for the New York Giants of the National Football League (NFL). He played college football for the East Tennessee State Buccaneers and Memphis Tigers.

== Early life ==
Martin attended Arabia Mountain High School located in Stonecrest, Georgia. Coming out of high school, Martin was rated as a two-star recruit, where he committed to play college football for the East Tennessee State Buccaneers.

== College career ==
=== East Tennessee State ===
In three years at East Tennessee State from 2020 to 2022, Martin appeared in 18 games with ten starts, where he totaled 103 tackles and three and a half sacks. After the 2022 season, he entered his name into the NCAA transfer portal.

=== Memphis ===
Martin transferred to Memphis. In his first season with the Tigers in 2023, he appeared in 13 games and notched 95 tackles with 17 being for a loss, three sacks, two pass deflections, two interceptions, two forced fumbles, a fumble recovery, and a touchdown. For his performance on the season, Martin was named first-team all-American Athletic Conference. In week 3 of the 2024 season, Martin notched eight tackles with two and a half being for a loss, a sack, and a fumble recovery, as he helped Memphis to a win over Florida State.

== Professional career ==
Pre-draft measurables
Height	Weight	Arm length	Hand span	Wingspan	40-yard dash	10-yard split	20-yard split	20-yard shuttle	Vertical jump	Broad jump	Bench press
5 ft 11 7/8 in (1.83 m)	229 lb (104 kg)	31 7/8 in (0.81 m)	10 in (0.25 m)	6 ft 4 3/8 in (1.94 m)	4.54 s	1.58 s	2.66 s	4.28 s	37.0 in (0.94 m)	10 ft 6 in (3.20 m)	17 reps
All values from Pro Day

=== Baltimore Ravens ===
Martin signed with the Baltimore Ravens as an undrafted free agent on May 4, 2025. He was waived on August 26 as part of final roster cuts and re-signed to the practice squad the next day. Martin made three appearances for Baltimore as a practice squad elevation, recording five combined tackles. In Week 13 against the Cincinnati Bengals, Martin suffered a torn ACL, ending his season.

=== Philadelphia Eagles ===
On March 31, 2026, Martin signed a two-year contract with the Philadelphia Eagles. He was waived by the Eagles on June 10.

=== New York Giants ===
On August 17, 2026, Martin signed with the New York Giants, reuniting himself with head coach John Harbaugh. He was waived by the Giants as a part of final roster cuts on August 30; he was re-signed to the team's practice squad the following day.
