= Flat Rock, Georgia =

Community in Georgia, U.S.

Flat Rock is a historic African American community in DeKalb County, Georgia. It is located within the city of Stonecrest. Flat Rock is believed to be one of the oldest African American settlements in DeKalb County. In 1820, the area rested along the border of the Creek and Cherokee Nation hunting grounds when it was settled during the Georgia Land Lottery. In 1865, after the end of the Civil War, the era of Reconstruction provided an opportunity for former enslaved people to stay in the area to build schools, churches, and civic organizations, and create the tight-knit African American Flat Rock Community. The community has continued to live in the area and has experienced the Black Codes, Jim Crow, and the Great Migration. The area currently houses the Flat Rock Archives, which specializes in preserving African American rural history in Georgia.

== History ==
=== Early history ===
In 1821, Revolutionary war soldiers and others acquired land through the Georgia Land Lottery and began to move into the area as Creek, Cherokee, and other natives were displaced. During this time, this area was described as a typical antebellum establishment and was located along the stagecoach route between Nashville and Augusta. Early settler, William Latimer established a stage coach stop in the area and incorporated a post office stop known as Latimer's Store April 26, 1832.

Early settlers have passed down stories of living along the border of the Creek and Cherokee Nation. It is recalled that the South River used to go by the name Weelaunee. It is also noted that before the 1821 Creek cession that resulted in Henry and then DeKalb County, trails crisscrossed the area between the South and Chattahoochee Rivers.

Flat Rock, Georgia, incorporated a post office in 1836. Henry Terry McDaniel (1810–1880) became the first postmaster of the Flat Rock post office in Henry County, Georgia. Henry T. McDaniel and his brother Ira O. McDaniel operated the post office along with a small antebellum general store. Ira O. McDaniel took the role as post master of the Flat Rock post office February 6, 1844. According to Ira McDaniel's unpublished manuscript, his father, Philip McDaniel was the first of the McDaniel family to move to the area where he owned a country residence situated on a high romantic hill near several acres of naked rock sprinkled with cedar trees. Ira stated that this area was called Flat Rock and gave name to the place and to the post office.

In the antebellum days, this area was a desirable location for farm and plantation owners, and many included the practice of slavery. Some of these families include the paternal ancestors of Margaret Mitchell, author of Gone with the Wind, who moved into the Flat Rock area in the 1830s. Her great grandfather sold the initial farm to Ira O. McDaniel, father of Georgia Governor Henry Dickerson McDaniel (1836-1926). Revolutionary war veteran Joseph Emmanuel Lyon built a cabin on his property in the 1820s and the Lyon family continuously owned their farm and land until descendants transferred ownership of the still standing home to DeKalb county. And early settler Charles Latimer is the father of controversial figure Rebecca Latimer Felton.

During this time, country farms peppered the landscape and Ira O. McDaniel lived near many of his sisters, brothers, and parents at the center of the Flat Rock area from 1842 to 1848. In 1848, the Georgia Railroad reached Marthasville and Atlanta was born. Ira, along with A.W. Mitchell and Daniel William Herring built houses in the early Atlanta area of Whitehall and Hunter Streets. This is when Atlanta saw her first brick home built and Ira split his store merchandise between the Flat Rock store and Atlanta on a joint account. Two years later, the Flat Rock store and farm was losing profit, so Ira sold his stock in the area and moved the Flat Rock store merchandise to the Atlanta store and also took his slaves with him. At this time A.W. Mitchell, Edwin McDaniel, Henry McDaniel, Dr. Cheek, and George Key all moved out of the area in search of better financial opportunities.

=== During the Civil War ===
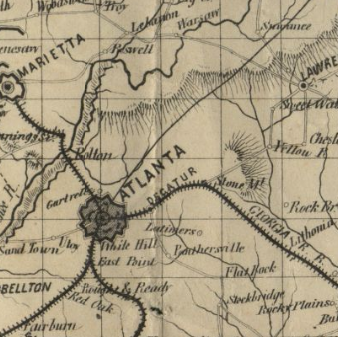
Civil War map used by the Union Army showing Flat Rock, Georgia

During the Civil War, General George Steone Jr, sent Kenner Garrid's Division to the Flat Rock area in order to protect the Union rear during the Atlanta Campaign. Garrard's Raid to South River, Georgia, included the 7th Penn. Cavalry heading to Flat Rock Bridge, Georgia, July 28, 1864. Union foraging parties also searched the area for supplies to bring back to the Union army while they occupied Atlanta. There was a skirmish between the Union and Confederate armies, on November 16, 1864, after Sherman's armies successfully defeated the Southern Confederate armies in the Battle of Atlanta, the March to the Sea, which included about 26,000 Union soldiers heading East traveled through the Flat Rock area where they crossed Snow Finger Creek and continued through Lithonia and Conyers. Some Union soldiers described what they witnessed as they traveled the countryside in Sherman's March to the Sea which included the following: the area was peppered with freed slaves, venturing out of their cabins and plantations to meet the singing soldiers to celebrate what seemed to former slaves as the day of the Jubilee. Some freed souls claimed that Sherman was the Great Deliver, as one man claimed he had been waiting for this "Angel of the Lord since he was knee high", as he had come and freed them all. So many freed peoples overwhelmed the soldiers as they recalled seeing every type of person imaginable from old to young, mulatto to black, males and females. The soldiers wrote about seeing toothless aunties, old souls with gray heads, woman carrying their babies in their arms wearing old torn clothing and all running to thank the soldiers and embrace the flags which were flown by the many regiments and companies. The newly freed slaves, which seemed like thousands to the Union soldiers, ran after the troops to join the Army of the Lord to freedom. At every crossroad and plantation more freed people joined the crowds signing with the bands playing their instruments.

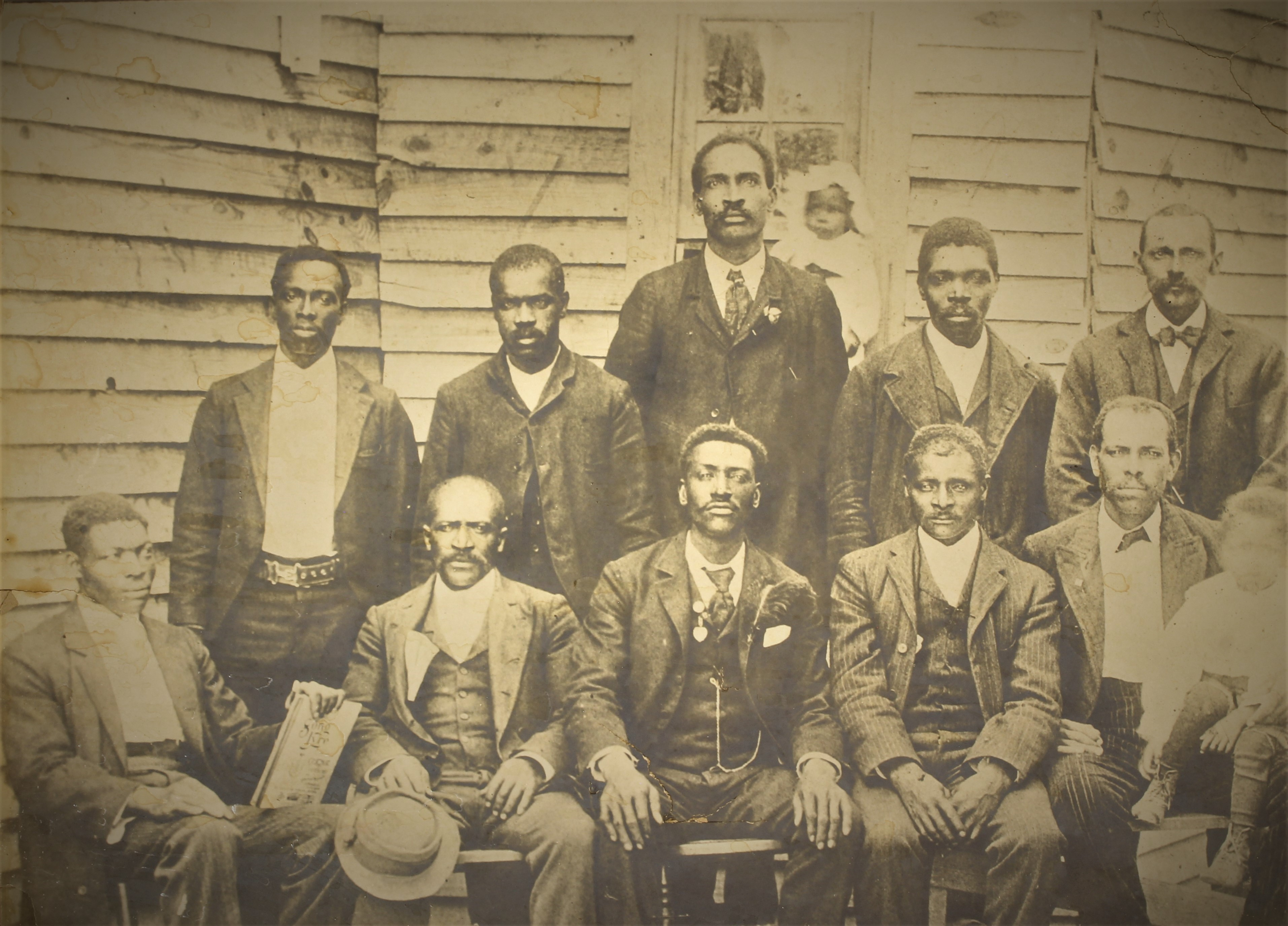
Early trustees of the Flat Rock United Methodist Church. Seated: Will Tanner, Tom Christian, Spencer Bryant-Chairman, Jerry Sypho, Rance Baily. Standing: James Wise, Hill Lyons, Rev. Jim Davis-Pastor, Henry Shumake, and Andrew Waits.

=== The Creation of the Flat Rock African American Community ===
After the Civil War ended and the enslaved received word of their freedom, many African Americans stayed in the area and banded together into a tight-knit community which would prove successful and be later recognized as the African American Flat Rock Community. According to the Flat Rock Community Church, formerly known as the Flat Rock United Methodist church, the Flat Rock Community expanded rapidly during 1870s-1880s bringing in more African American families which included the Shumake, Hellums, Christians, and Syphos families from Morgan County and the Waits and Wise families from Butts county in 1887.

The earliest known Flat Rock Methodist Episcopal church deed is from 1896, 16th District, DeKalb County and lists the church trustees as Samuel Folds, George Holt, Early Reed "and their Successors" acquiring land from a white landowner to own the land for the Flat Rock church. Later on July 7, 1909, the Flat Rock church trustees are listed as Flat Rock school trustees as shown in an agreement/deed signed by Burgress, Clerk and reads: "State of Georgia, DeKalb County, there is an agreement with trustees of the Flat Rock School, S.B. Bryant, H. Lyons and …. And they are acquiring land from white landowner Mr. South."

During the Great Migration, Flat Rock resident, T.A. Bryant Sr. saw the need to keep the community together by encouraging others to stay in Flat Rock. He purchased 40 acres for $600 and sold it in pieces to family members and others so they could stay in the area. In an interview for NPR, Henry Louis Gates stated that "[Bryant] was trying to give them a stake in the South, a reason to stay, 'cause they were not going to own property in Pittsburgh, Detroit or Cincinnati, in Philadelphia or New York."

Electricity and telephone did not come to the Flat Rock area until the 1940s. As a result, cold drinks and ice were considered a luxury. Community member Joe Kelly owned a small store next to the Flat Rock Ball Field. The luxury items that came out of his store included cold drinks, ice, snuff tobacco, cigarettes and cigars, sardines and crackers, potted meat, moon pies, and lots of candy. The Kelly's also had fresh cantaloupe and watermelon, sweet potatoes and white dirt (to white wash).

Baseball had a huge presence within the community, with stories stemming from the days of the Early Flat Rock Church trustees like Spencer Bryant who lived during the late 19th century until the 1940s. Mr. Spencer Bryant had an area in their pasture that they leveled and drew a baseball diamond. This field would draw crowds from neighboring communities during weekends in the summertime. The communities would play baseball and picnic in the field. Being the businessman that he was, Mr. Spencer Bryant also rented out the area to churches in Atlanta. These congregations would come out and spend the day picnicking and playing in the field.

Many main roads remained unpaved until the 1980s.

== Flat Rock Archive ==
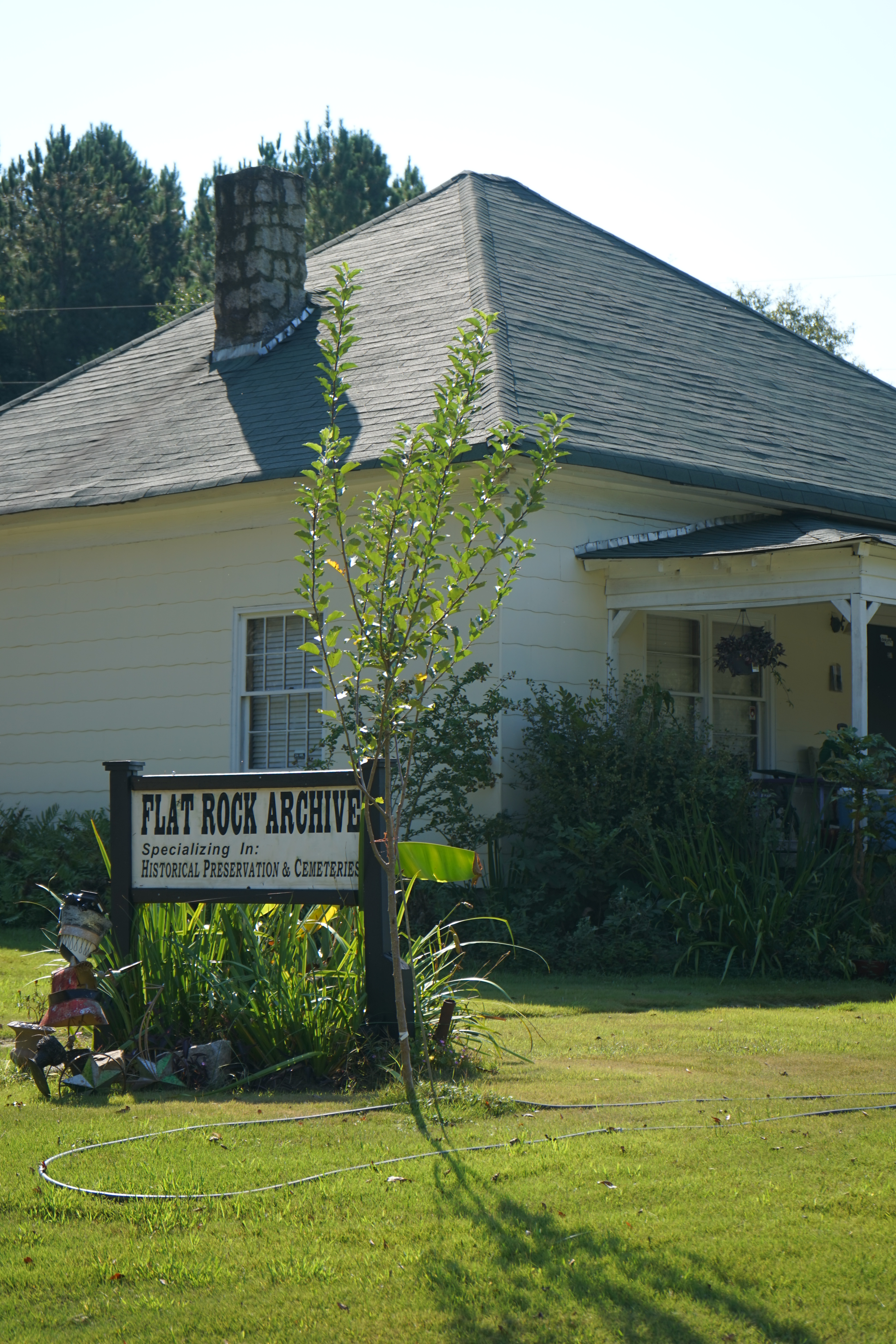
The Flat Rock Archive in Stonecrest, Georgia

The Flat Rock Archive, located in Stonecrest, Georgia, is currently working to preserve the African American story in this area. One example is that after looking at the Lyon family that lived in the area, the archive concluded that in 1860, the Lyon farm had three slave houses located on the knoll east of the main house. According to Slave Schedules of 1860, the Lyon family had seventeen slaves. One of these slaves is identified as Mary Lyon, who had a son by the name of Thee Lyon.

The Flat Rock Archive strives to preserve African American rural history in Georgia and is located in the home built by T.A. Bryant Sr., and donated by Reverend T.A. Bryant, Jr. The archive was established as a museum and resource to genealogical and historic research, as well as a heritage tourism site. In addition to preserving and cataloging artifacts, records, and oral histories related to the slaves, former slaves, and descendants in the community, the Flat Rock Archive maintains the nearby Flat Rock Historic Cemetery as a part of their mission.

=== Significant sites ===
The Flat Rock Archives consists of a variety of historic sites within the Flat Rock community.

==== The T. A. Bryant, Sr. House & Homestead ====
The T. A. Bryant, Sr. House and surrounding homestead are a centerpiece of the Flat Rock Archive and key to the story of the Flat Rock Community. The House was built in 1917. After Bryant, Sr. bought the land subsequently sold or leased small parcels off to other members of the Flat Rock community. In doing so, Bryant, Sr. gave people a stake in the South and kept the people of Flat Rock together.

==== The Historic Flat Rock Cemetery ====
The Historic Flat Rock Cemetery is an important part of the Flat Rock community, with numerous people from throughout the community's history buried at the historic cemetery site. A list of interred can be found on the Flat Rock Archives website. This list only includes those that have been definitively placed in the cemetery. There are many more that do not have historical records.

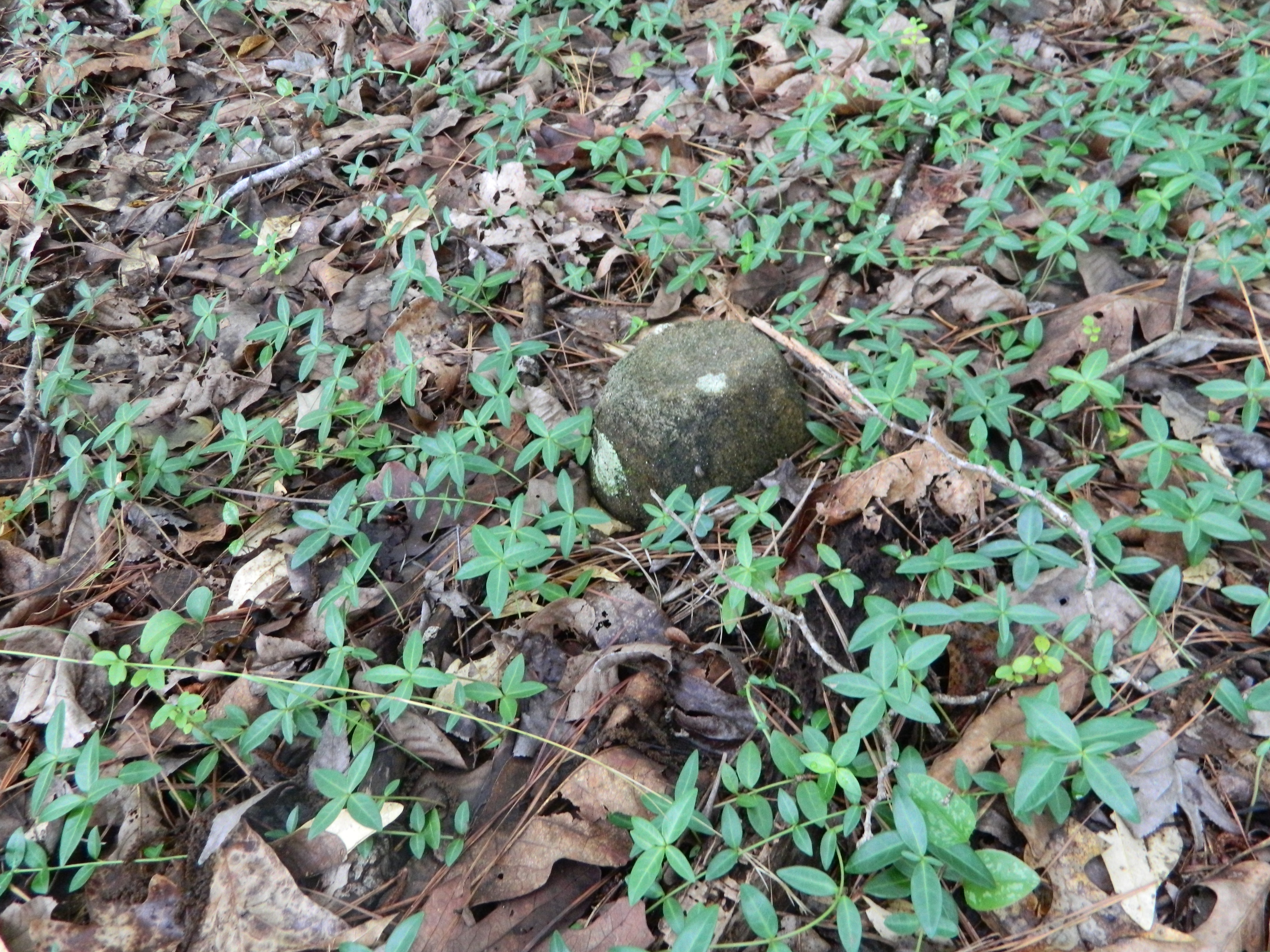
Unidentified Fieldstone grave. Photo is a Footstone of an unidentified grave located within the Historical Flat Rock Cemetery. Material is Lithonia, Georgia, granite.

In 2008, Dr. Jeffrey Glover of Georgia State University organized a cemetery mapping project with his Fall Archaeological Methods course students. Glover's class worked with the local Flat Rock community and the Greater Atlanta Historical Society (GAAS) to clear the overgrowth from the cemetery. After the clearing, students documented the graves using standardized forms, digital cameras, and some stone rubbings. The graves were then mapped using a total station to create accurate GPS points within the cemetery. The project documented 202 graves total and of those 107 were unidentified fieldstones.

==== Lyon House ====
Built in the 1820s by former British soldier Joseph Emmanuel Lyon, the Lyon House and homestead are key to Flat Rock's beginnings: people were enslaved here. The Lyon House underwent a stabilization effort in 2019-2019 and today is a part of Flat Rock tours.

==== Flat Rock Church ====
The Flat Rock Church was an important meeting place for the community for decades. While it is no longer standing, a new church has been built on the site and archaeologists and historians with the Flat Rock Archive are working to preserve its role in the community.

== Notable residents and descendants ==
Name	Known for	Association to the Flat Rock Area
Lee Brown	59th Mayor of Houston, criminologist and businessman	Direct descendant of early Gault family Flat Rock community members
Willie Gault	NFL football player and track and field athlete	Direct descendant of early Flat Rock community members Reece Gault and Agnes Waits (born a slave)
Warren Moon	NFL and CFL football player	Direct descendant of Early Flat Rock Methodist Church Trustee John Waits and Agnes Wise Waits
Chris Tucker	Actor and stand-up comedian	Direct descendant of early Flat Rock Methodist Church trustee Spencer Bryant
Ernest J Waits, Sr. 'Ernie'	Civil Rights pioneer, first African-American DJ in Cincinnati, Ohio	Direct descendant of Agnes Wise Waits
Robert E. Wooten, SR.	Founded the Wooten Choral Ensemble in 1949	Direct descendant of Floral Waits and early Flat Rock Methodist Church trustee John Waits
Bobby Wooten	Music Producer	Direct descendant of Floral Waits and early Flat Rock Methodist Church trustee John Waits
