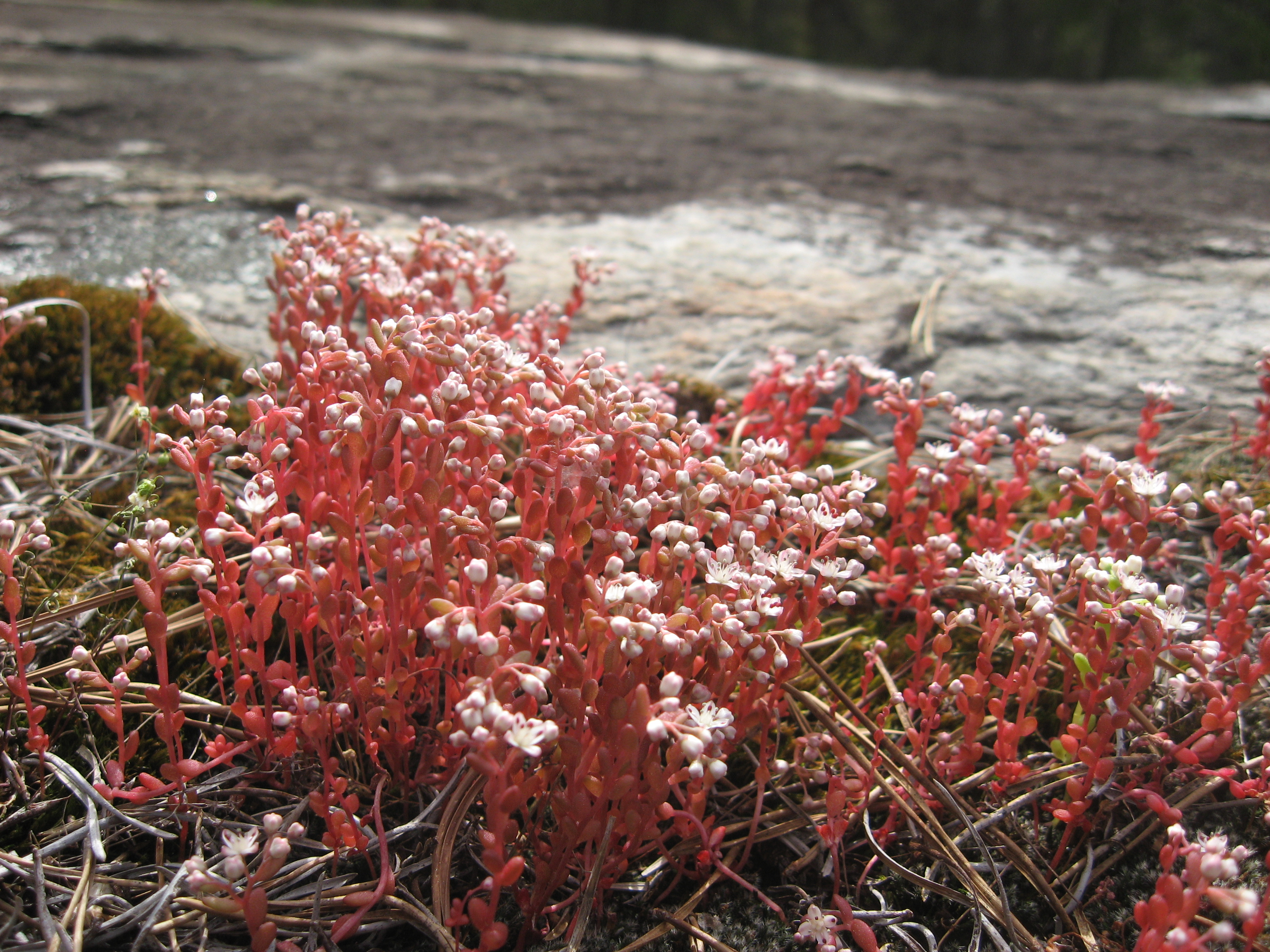

Scientific classification
- Kingdom: Plantae
- Clade: Tracheophytes
- Clade: Angiosperms
- Clade: Eudicots
- Order: Saxifragales
- Family: Crassulaceae
- Genus: Sedum
- Species: S. smallii

Binomial name
- Sedum smallii (Britton) H.E.Ahles

Synonyms
- Diamorpha cymosa (Nutt.) Britton ex Small; Diamorpha smallii Britton; Sedum cymosum var. smallii (Britton) Fröd.; Sedum cymosum (Nutt.) Fröd., nom. illeg.; Tillaea cymosa Nutt.

= Sedum smallii =

Genus of succulents

Sedum smallii, synonym Diamorpha smallii, is a species of plants in the family Crassulaceae. It is known as elf orpine and Small's stonecrop. As Diamorpha smallii it was considered to be the only species in the genus Diamorpha.

Sedum smallii is endemic to the southeastern United States. It becomes active in late fall and winter, blooms in late March, then dies. It has red succulent leaves that act to reflect light and hold water. It is found primarily on solution pools, shallow basins on rocky outcrops that contain seasonal pools. The plant is mainly found in Georgia, though populations have also been noted in Alabama, South Carolina, North Carolina, Tennessee, and Virginia. It is listed as an endangered species by the Tennessee Department of Environment and Conservation.

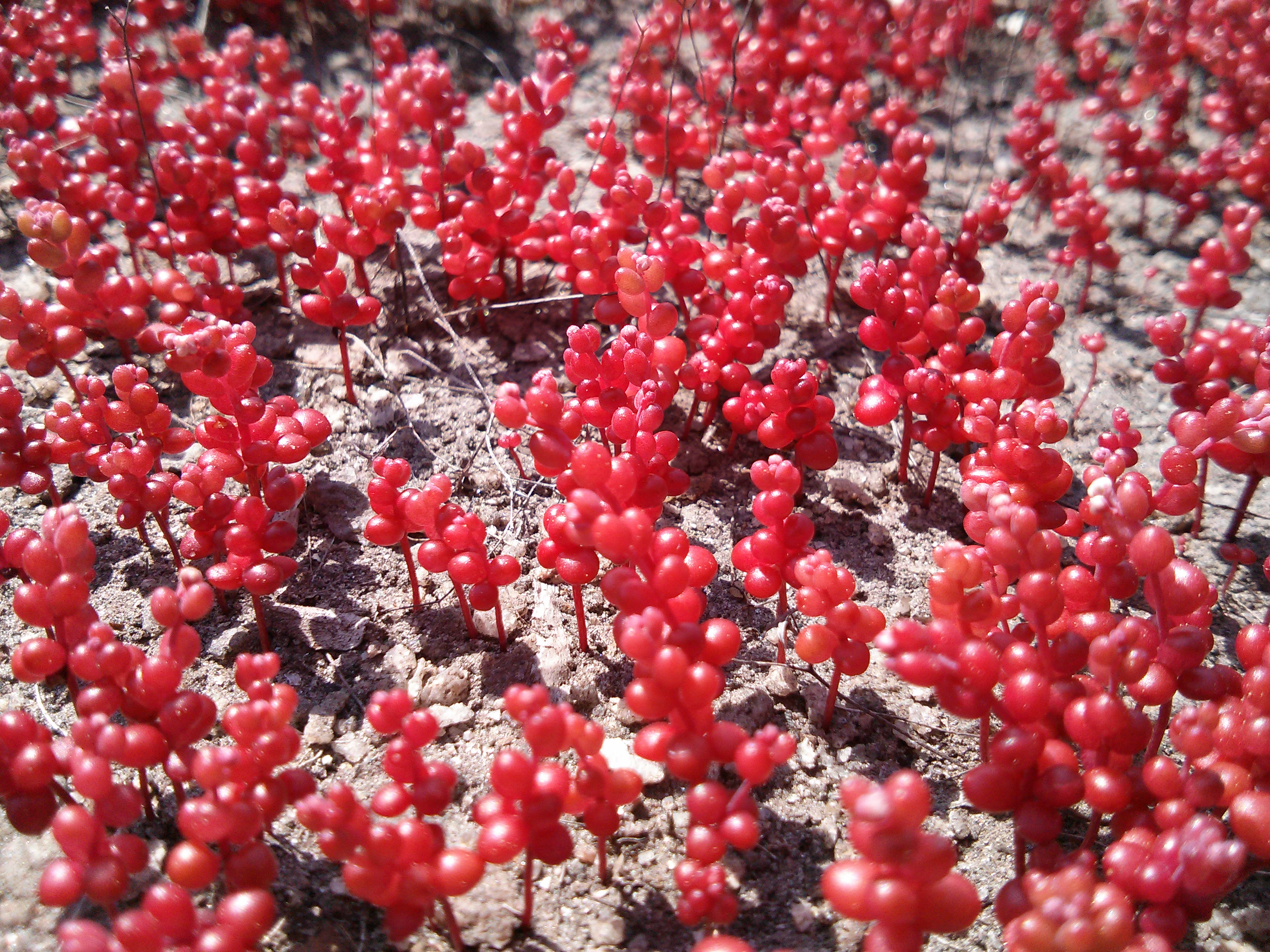
In early spring

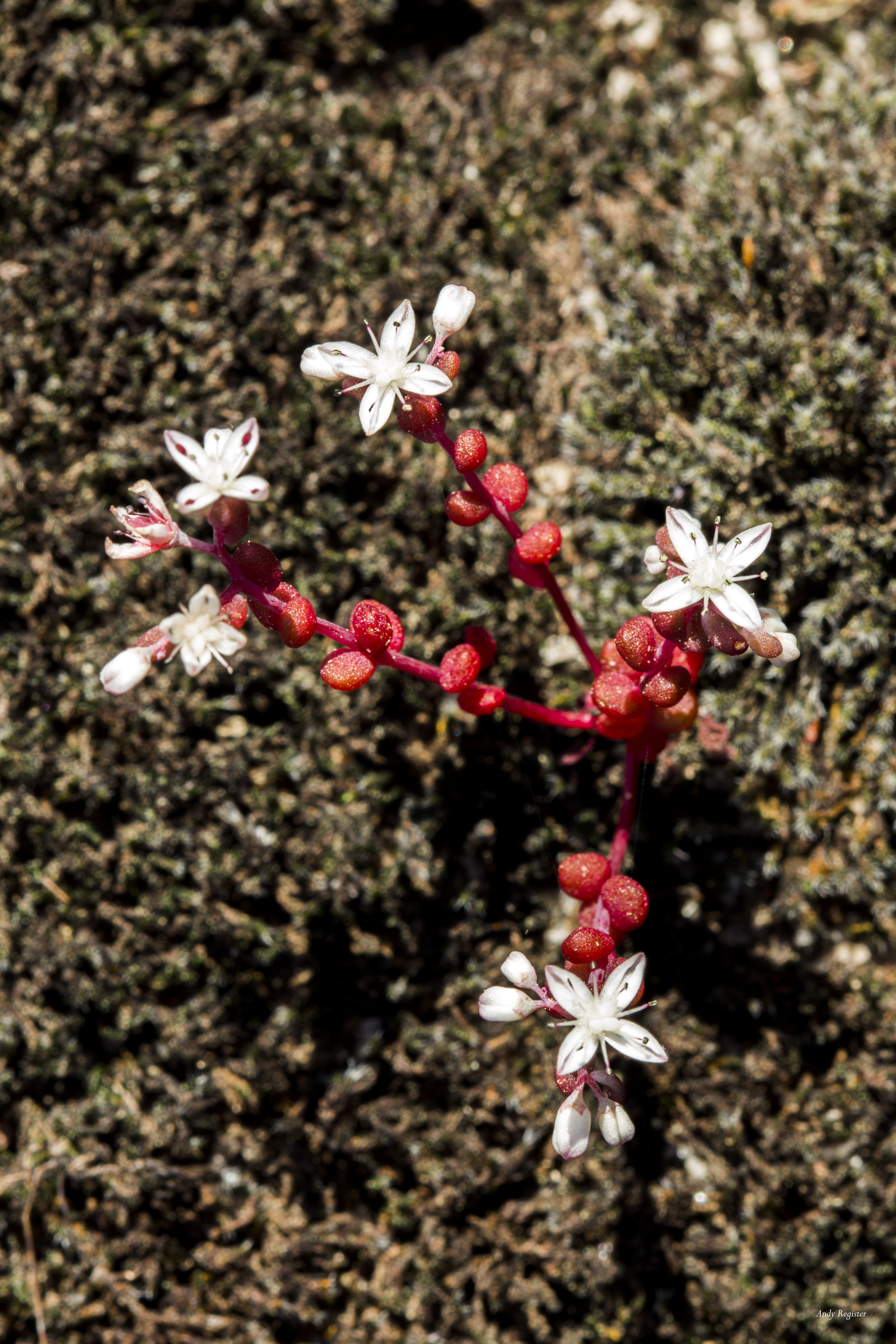
In bloom at Arabia Mountain, Georgia
