= Breshad Perriman =

American football player (born 1993)

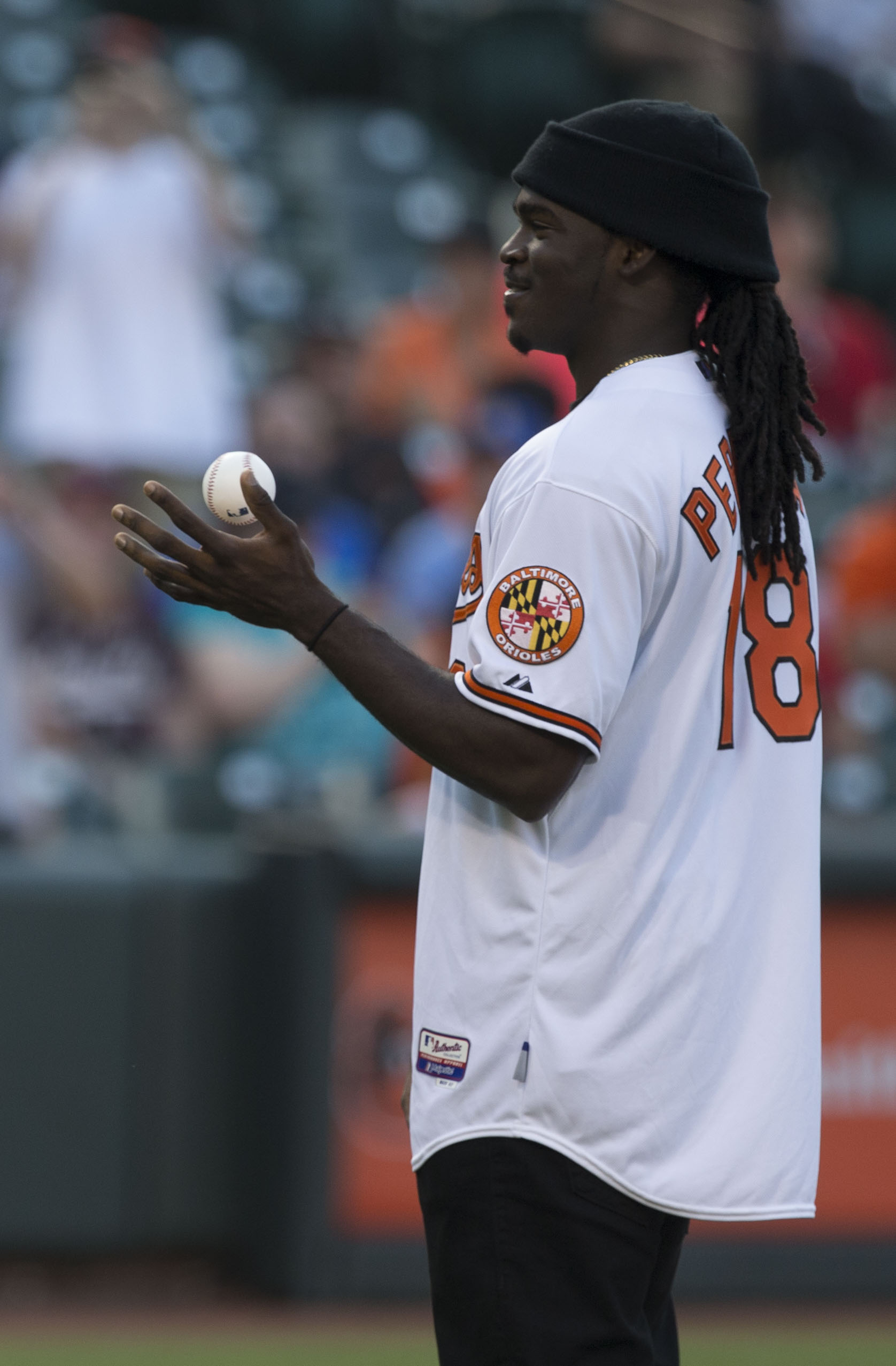
- Perriman in 2015

No. 18, 11, 19, 16
- Position: Wide receiver

Personal information
- Born: September 10, 1993 (age 33); Miami, Florida, U.S.
- Listed height: 6 ft 2 in (1.88 m)
- Listed weight: 215 lb (98 kg)

Career information
- High school: Arabia Mountain (Lithonia, Georgia)
- College: UCF (2012–2014)
- NFL draft: 2015: 1st round, 26th overall pick

Career history
- Baltimore Ravens (2015–2017); Washington Redskins (2018); Cleveland Browns (2018); Tampa Bay Buccaneers (2019); New York Jets (2020); Detroit Lions (2021)*; Chicago Bears (2021); Tampa Bay Buccaneers (2021–2022); Indianapolis Colts (2023)*
- * Offseason or practice squad member only

Awards and highlights
- First-team All-AAC (2014)

Career NFL statistics
- Receptions: 145
- Receiving yards: 2,343
- Receiving touchdowns: 16
- Stats at Pro Football Reference

Breshad Raynard Perriman (born September 10, 1993), is an American former professional football player who was a wide receiver in the National Football League (NFL). He played college football for the UCF Knights and was selected by the Baltimore Ravens in the first round of the 2015 NFL draft. He was also a member of the Washington Redskins, Cleveland Browns, Tampa Bay Buccaneers, New York Jets, Detroit Lions, Chicago Bears, and Indianapolis Colts.

== Early life ==
Perriman attended Arabia Mountain High School in Lithonia, Georgia, where he played high school football for the Rams. As a junior, he had 27 catches for 512 yards and six touchdowns. As a senior, he had 13 catches for 301 yards and three touchdowns in only four games played. Arguably the top receiver in DeKalb County during his senior season, Perriman participated in the 2010 DeKalb County Coaches Association Senior All-Star Football Game and was the MVP of the Elite One Performance Football Camp. Perriman finished his high school career for new Class 5A Arabia Mountain in Lithonia, after playing for Lithonia's Martin Luther King and Conyers' Heritage high schools.

Perriman was rated by Rivals.com as a two-star recruit. He committed to the University of Central Florida (UCF) to play college football.

== College career ==
Perriman attended UCF from 2012 to 2014. In UCF's final conference game of 2014, against East Carolina, Perriman had a game winning 51-yard touchdown reception. which gave the Knights a share of the American Athletic Conference Championship.

After his junior season, Perriman decided to forgo his senior season and entered the 2015 NFL draft. He finished his collegiate career with 115 receptions for 2,243 yards and 16 touchdowns.

== Professional career ==
=== Pre-draft ===
Perriman did not participate at the NFL Combine due to a hamstring injury. He did, however, show impressive physical ability at UCFs Pro Day at the end of March 2015, where he ran two sub-4.4 40-yard dashes. This sent him climbing in several mock drafts, and some projected him to be a mid-first round pick of the 2015 NFL Draft.

Pre-draft measurables
Height	Weight	Arm length	Hand span	40-yard dash	10-yard split	20-yard split	Vertical jump	Broad jump	Bench press
6 ft 2 in (1.88 m)	212 lb (96 kg)	32 in (0.81 m)	9 1/4 in (0.23 m)	4.26 s	1.51 s	2.35 s	36.5 in (0.93 m)	10 ft 7 in (3.23 m)	18 reps
All values from NFL Combine/UCF's Pro Day

=== Baltimore Ravens ===
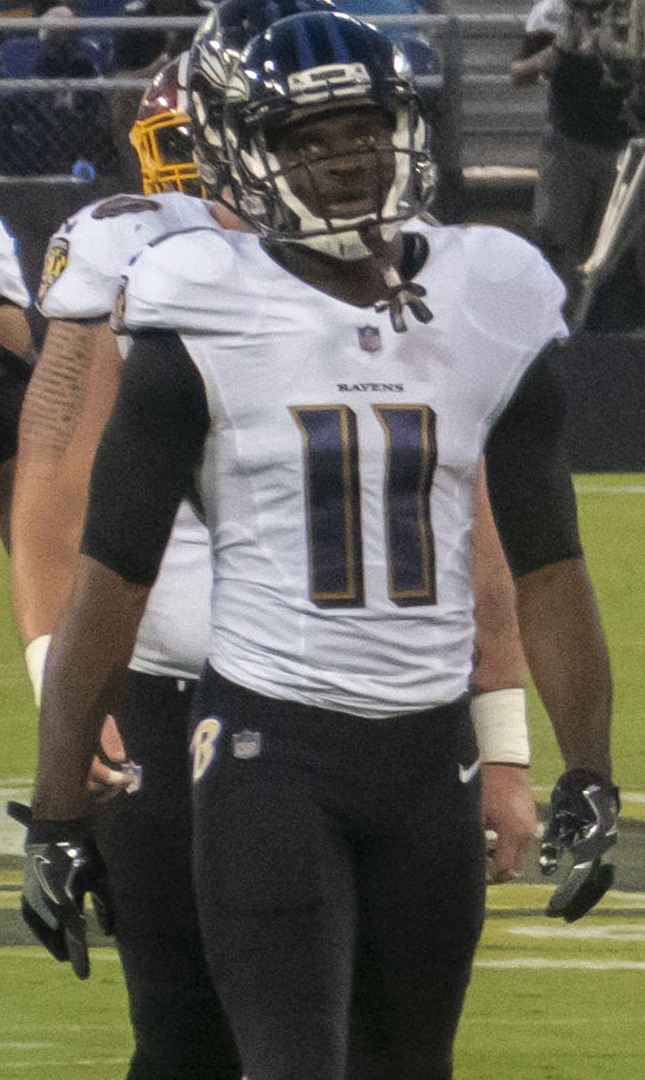
Perriman with the Baltimore Ravens in 2018

On April 30, 2015, Perriman was selected in the first round with the 26th overall pick by the Baltimore Ravens. On May 11, he signed a rookie contract with the Ravens. The deal was reportedly worth $8.7 million over four years with a $4.6 million signing bonus. On November 17, Perriman was placed on season ending injured reserve.

In his NFL debut on September 11, 2016, Perriman had one reception for 35 yards against the Buffalo Bills. Perriman's first start in the NFL came on October 23. He caught one pass for 11 yards in a 16–24 loss to the New York Jets.

On May 1, 2017, the Ravens announced that Perriman would switch from No. 18 to No. 11 for the season. Perriman wore No. 11 at UCF and was able to switch after the previous owner and fellow former UCF receiver, Kamar Aiken, left to the Indianapolis Colts during free agency.

On May 2, 2018, the Ravens declined the fifth-year option on Perriman's contract, making him a free agent in 2019. On September 1, he was released by the Ravens.

=== Washington Redskins ===
On September 17, 2018, Perriman signed with the Washington Redskins, but was waived five days later on September 22.

=== Cleveland Browns ===
On October 13, 2018, Perriman signed with the Cleveland Browns. He finished the season with 16 catches for 340 yards and two touchdowns.

=== Tampa Bay Buccaneers (first stint) ===
On March 13, 2019, Perriman signed a one-year $4 million contract with the Tampa Bay Buccaneers. In Week 13, during a 28–11 win over the Jacksonville Jaguars, Perriman had a career-best five catches for 87 yards. In Week 14, during a 38–35 win over the Indianapolis Colts, Perriman caught three passes for 70 yards and a game clinching touchdown. In Week 15, during a 38–17 win over the Detroit Lions, Perriman caught five passes for a career high 113 yards and three touchdowns. In the following week's game against the Houston Texans, Perriman caught seven passes for 102 yards during the 23–20 loss. In Week 17 against the Atlanta Falcons, Perriman caught five passes for 134 yards and a touchdown during the 28–22 overtime loss. Overall, Perriman finished the 2019 season with 36 receptions for 645 receiving yards and six receiving touchdowns.

=== New York Jets ===
On April 1, 2020, Perriman signed a one-year contract with the Jets worth $8 million with $6 million guaranteed. In Week 9, on Monday Night Football against the New England Patriots, he had five receptions for 101 receiving yards and two receiving touchdowns in the 30–27 loss. In the 2020 season, Perriman appeared in and started 12 games. He finished with 30 receptions for 505 receiving yards and three receiving touchdowns.

=== Detroit Lions ===
On March 22, 2021, Perriman signed a one-year contract with the Detroit Lions. On August 30, the Lions cut Perriman.

=== Chicago Bears ===
On September 6, 2021, Perriman signed a one-year, $900,000 contract with the Chicago Bears. He was waived on November 7, without playing a snap for the team.

=== Tampa Bay Buccaneers (second stint) ===
On November 9, 2021, Perriman was signed to the Buccaneers practice squad. He was promoted to the active roster in December. On December 12, Perriman caught a 58-yard touchdown from Tom Brady; the touchdown was a walk—off in overtime against the Buffalo Bills. The pass was Brady’s 700th touchdown pass. Perriman played in six games in the 2021 season and had 11 receptions for 167 yards and one touchdown.

On March 24, 2022, Perriman re-signed with the Buccaneers. Perriman appeared in 11 games in the 2022 season, finishing the year with nine receptions for 110 receiving yards and one receiving touchdown.

=== Indianapolis Colts ===
On June 5, 2023, Perriman signed with the Indianapolis Colts. He was released by Indianapolis on August 29.

== Career statistics ==
=== NFL ===
Year	Team	Games		Receiving					Rushing					Fumbles	
Year	Team	GP	GS	Rec	Yds	Avg	Lng	TD	Att	Yds	Avg	Lng	TD	Fum	Lost
2015	BAL	0	0	Did not play due to injury											
2016	BAL	16	1	33	499	15.1	53T	3	1	2	2.0	2	0	0	0
2017	BAL	11	3	10	77	7.7	14	0	0	0	0.0	0	0	0	0
2018	CLE	10	2	16	340	21.3	66	2	4	2	0.5	7	0	0	0
2019	TB	14	4	36	645	17.9	44	6	2	16	8.0	13	0	0	0
2020	NYJ	12	12	30	505	16.8	53	3	1	6	6.0	0	0	0	0
2021	TB	6	0	11	167	15.2	58	1	1	−3	−3.0	−3	0	0	0
2022	TB	11	3	9	110	12.2	28	1	2	−7	−3.5	0	0	2	1
Career		80	25	145	2,343	16.2	66	16	11	16	1.5	13	0	2	1

=== College ===
Season	Team	Conf	Class	Pos	GP	Receiving			
Season	Team	Conf	Class	Pos	GP	Rec	Yds	Avg	TD
2012	UCF	CUSA	FR	WR	14	26	388	14.9	3
2013	UCF	American	SO	WR	12	39	811	20.8	4
2014	UCF	American	JR	WR	13	50	1,044	20.9	9
Career					39	115	2,243	19.5	16

== Personal life ==
His father, Brett Perriman, played ten years in the NFL as a wide receiver for four teams.
