= Arabia Mountain High School =

Public high school in Stonecrest, Georgia, United States

Coordinates: 33°39′2″N 84°7′51″W

Location
- 6610 Browns Mill Road; Stonecrest (Lithonia), Georgia, 30038; United States

Information
- Type: Public
- Opened: 2009
- School district: DeKalb County School District
- Principal: Tanya Mason
- Teaching staff: 62.00 (on an FTE basis)
- Grades: 9-12
- Enrollment: 1,272 (2023–2024)
- Student to teacher ratio: 20.52
- Colors: Hunter green, navy and white
- Song: "Arabia Mountain High"
- Team name: Rams
- Website: arabiamtnhs.dekalb.k12.ga.us

Arabia Mountain High School Academy of Engineering Medicine and Environmental Studies is located on the edge of the Arabia Mountain green space in Stonecrest, Georgia, United States, with a Lithonia post office address. This public high school opened in August 2009. It is a LEED-certified building and uses the "Environment as an Integrating Context for learning" (EIC) curriculum. It is connected to the nature preserve via a spur bicycle path.

== Athletics ==
Arabia Mountain students compete in baseball, basketball, cross country, football, golf, gymnastics, soccer, softball, swimming, tennis, track, volleyball, and wrestling.

In 2015, the Baltimore Ravens drafted Arabia Mountain alumnus Breshad Perriman as the 26th pick in the first round of the NFL draft.

== Marching Band ==
Led by Karalda Perkins, the Arabia Mountain Marching Rams have performed in the High Stepping Nationals, Atlanta Football Classic Parade, Clark Atlanta University Homecoming Parade, Florida Classic Parade, and Magic City Classic Parade. The Marching Rams have also swept accolades in regional and state competitions showcased in the Metro Atlanta area.

== Notable alumni ==
- Chandler Martin (Class of 2020) - college football player
- Jakobi Meyers (Class of 2015) - NFL player
- Breshad Perriman (Class of 2011) - NFL player
