= PATH Foundation =

- PATH Foundation logo since 1991
- Abbreviation: PATH
- Formation: 1991; 35 years ago
- Founders: Ed McBrayer; Pete Pellegrini; Maxine Rock
- Type: 501(c)(3) nonprofit organization
- Purpose: Trail and greenway development
- Headquarters: 1601 West Peachtree Street, Atlanta, Georgia
- Region served: Metro Atlanta and the State of Georgia
- Chairman: Austin Stephens
- Executive Director: Greta deMayo
- Website: www.pathfoundation.org

PATH Foundation is a non-profit organization that builds off-road trails in and around the metro Atlanta area for walking, running, skating, and cycling. The foundation was established in 1991 by Ed McBrayer, Pete Pellegrini, and Maxine Rock, with the goal of developing a network of off-road trails in Atlanta in time for use during the 1996 Summer Olympics. The trails are also a way to connect neighborhoods and preserve the regional character. The first demonstration trails were built near Clarkston in DeKalb County. As of 2026, PATH has built more than 340 miles of trail throughout Georgia, with trails in Atlanta, Smyrna, Decatur, Stone Mountain, Conyers, and elsewhere in the state.

Co-founder Ed McBrayer led PATH as executive director until his retirement, when he was succeeded by Greta deMayo, the organization's second executive director.

== Mission statement ==
According to the PATH Foundation, their mission statement is "To transform Metro Atlanta into the most trail-connected city in the United States and to share knowledge and experience with other communities to promote trail development."

== PATH Foundation trails ==
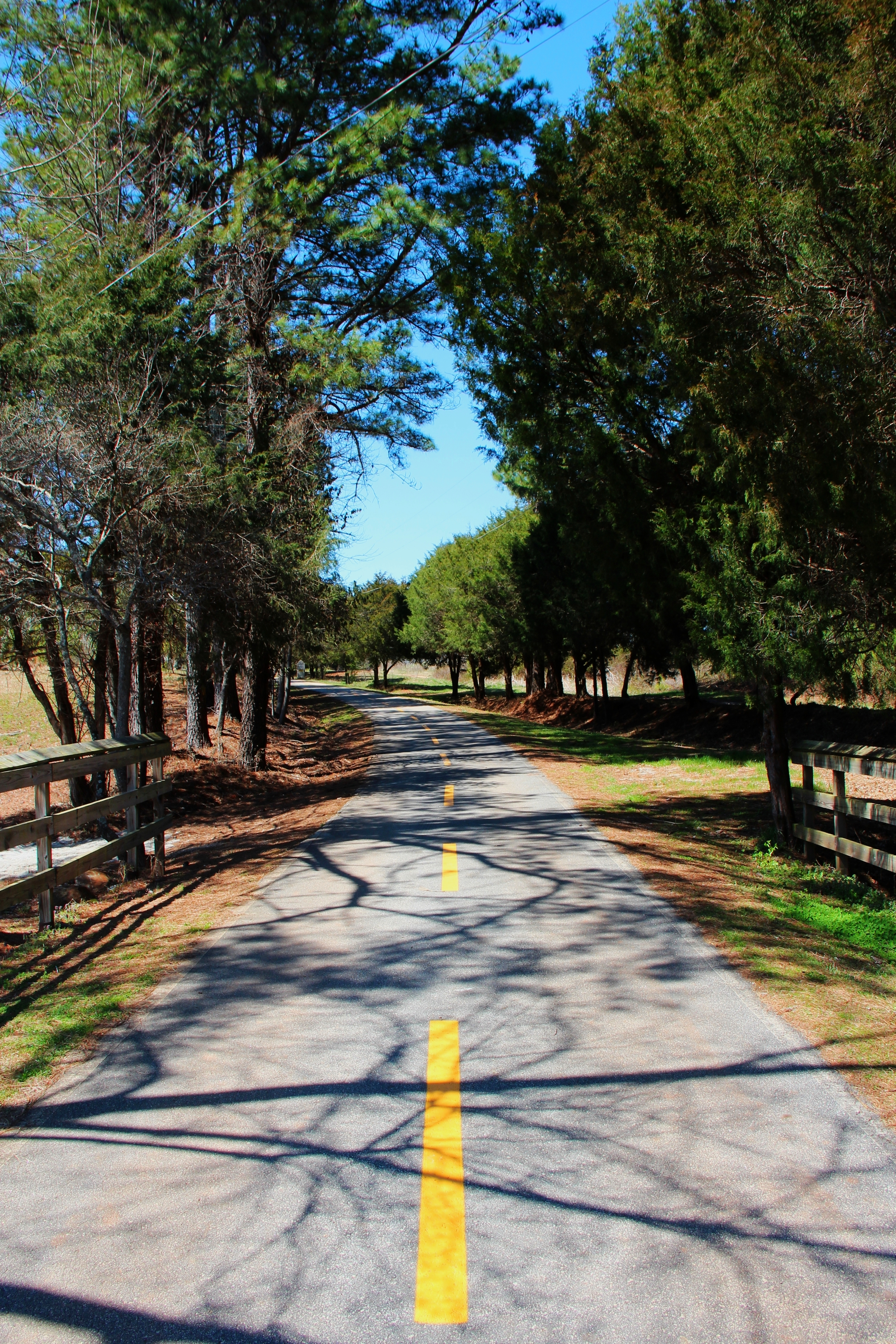
PATH Foundation trail in Panola Mountain State Park

=== Metro Atlanta trails ===
==== West Trails ====
- Lionel Hampton Trail
- PATH Parkway
- Proctor Creek Greenway
- Silver Comet Trail
- Southwest BeltLine Connector
- Westside BeltLine Connector
- Westside BeltLine Trail
- Westside Trail
- Whetstone Creek Trail

==== North Trails ====
- Nancy Creek Greenway
- Northwest BeltLine Connector — Tanyard Park
- PATH400
- Chastain Park Trail
- Peachtree Creek Greenway

==== East Trails ====
- Decatur PATH
- East Decatur Greenway
- Eastside BeltLine
- Emory PATH
- Freedom Park Trail
- South Peachtree Creek Trail
- Stone Mountain Trail
- Eastside Trolley Trail

==== South Trails ====
- East Point PATH
- Southtowne Trail
- South River Trail (West)

=== Georgia regional trails ===
- Arabia Mountain PATH
- Carrollton Greenbelt
- Clayton Connects
- Columbus Dragonfly Trail
- Covington Cricket Frog Trail
- LaGrange Thread
- Island Wide Trail System
- Newnan LINC
- Olde Town Conyers Trail
- Panola Mountain Greenway
- Silver Comet Trail
- South River Trail (East)
- Wilkins Greenway

=== Additional trails ===
- Spanish Moss Trail — Beaufort, South Carolina

== PATH board ==
=== Chairman ===
- Austin Stephens

=== Vice chairman ===
- Alexander C. Taylor

=== Secretary ===
- Tree McGlown

=== Treasurer ===
- Stephen Lanier

=== Board members ===
- Harry L. Anderson
- B. Harvey Hill, Jr.
- Jaime Hockin
- Ciannat Howett
- James C. Kennedy
- Sarah K. Kennedy
- Scott Kitchens
- E. Cody Laird, Jr.
- Lyle Ross
- Lauren Shepard

=== Emeritus members ===
- W. Douglas Ellis, Jr.
- Bill Fowler
- Carol Muldawer
- R. Charles Shufeldt
- John W. Somerhalder II
- Stephanie Stephens

The foundation's board has changed substantially since the early 2010s. Sam Friedman, PATH's founding chairman, transitioned to chairman emeritus in 2021 and died in January 2024 at age 83. Jennifer Dorian and Charles Shufeldt previously served as secretary and chairman, respectively, before the leadership changes reflected above.

== 20th anniversary and triPATHlon ==
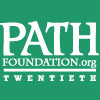
PATH Foundation's 20th Anniversary logo

In 2011, PATH celebrated its 20th anniversary. In May 2011, PATH created Atlanta's first in-town triathlon called "triPATHlon" and sanctioned by USA Triathlon. The triPATHlon benefited Chastain Park.
