= Stonecrest, Georgia =

City in Georgia, United States

- City
- Flag Seal Logo
- Coordinates: 33°42′04″N 84°10′19″W
- Country: United States
- State: Georgia
- County: DeKalb

Government
  - Type: Mayor-Council
  - Mayor: Jazzmin Cobble

Area
  - Total: 37.97 sq mi (98.34 km^{2})
  - Land: 37.40 sq mi (96.87 km^{2})
  - Water: 0.57 sq mi (1.47 km^{2})
- Elevation: 883 ft (269 m)

Population (2020)
  - Total: 59,194
  - Density: 1,582.6/sq mi (611.05/km^{2})
- Time zone: UTC-5 (Eastern (EST))
  - Summer (DST): UTC-4 (EDT)
- FIPS code: 13-73784
- GNIS feature ID: 2786722
- Website: stonecrestga.gov

Stonecrest is a city in DeKalb County, Georgia, United States. The boundaries of the city generally lie in the far southeastern corner of the county, with a smaller portion just north of Interstate 20. The city borders Lithonia, as well as Rockdale and Henry counties.

The city's population was 59,194 at the 2020 census, which makes it the 15th-largest city in the state as well as the largest city that is entirely within DeKalb County, as Atlanta, the state capital, is located mostly within Fulton County.

== History ==
Residents in the area voted in the November 2016 General Election to approve the city. In March 2017, elections were held to elect representatives for five city council districts as well as mayor. Jason Lary, a former insurance executive, concert promoter, and advocate of incorporation was elected the city's first mayor.

The area is home to the Mall at Stonecrest, for which it is named, as well as the Davidson-Arabia Nature Preserve, Flat Rock Archives, and Arabia Mountain National Heritage Area.

The city had voted a plan to deannex 345 acres of its territory so that the Georgia Legislature could create a new city, to be called Amazon, Georgia, if Stonecrest had been selected to host Amazon's new corporate headquarters, a project which would result in billions of dollars of investment and the creation of 50,000 jobs, a number equal to the estimated population of Stonecrest.

Jason Lary, the former Mayor of Stonecrest pleaded guilty in federal court to stealing COVID-19 relief funds that were supposed to go to struggling businesses. Jason Lary, whose resignation went into effect at 10 a.m. Wednesday, January 5, 2022, pleaded guilty to three counts involving wire fraud, theft of government funds and conspiracy. Lary agreed that he diverted at least $650,000 in relief money by requiring Stonecrest churches and businesses to kick back a portion of their grant money to companies he controlled.

== Demographics ==
Historical population
Census	Pop.	Note	%±
2020	59,194		—
2025 (est.)	61,337	▲	3.6%
U.S. Decennial Census; 1850-1870 1870-1880; 1890-1910 1920-1930; 1940 1950 1960; 1970 1980 1990; 2000 2010 2020; 2025

=== 2020 census ===
As of the 2020 census, Stonecrest had a population of 59,194 and contained 23,071 households and 11,759 families. The median age was 35.2 years. 24.2% of residents were under the age of 18 and 10.7% of residents were 65 years of age or older. For every 100 females there were 78.4 males, and for every 100 females age 18 and over there were 72.2 males age 18 and over.

98.4% of residents lived in urban areas, while 1.6% lived in rural areas.

There were 23,071 households in Stonecrest, of which 33.7% had children under the age of 18 living in them. Of all households, 26.4% were married-couple households, 19.0% were households with a male householder and no spouse or partner present, and 47.9% were households with a female householder and no spouse or partner present. About 30.7% of all households were made up of individuals and 6.8% had someone living alone who was 65 years of age or older.

There were 24,452 housing units, of which 5.6% were vacant. The homeowner vacancy rate was 1.9% and the rental vacancy rate was 6.4%.

Stonecrest city, Georgia – Racial and ethnic composition Note: the US Census treats Hispanic/Latino as an ethnic category. This table excludes Latinos from the racial categories and assigns them to a separate category. Hispanics/Latinos may be of any race.
Race / Ethnicity (NH = Non-Hispanic)	Pop 2020	% 2020
Black or African American alone (NH)	54,099	91.39%
Native American or Alaska Native alone (NH)	67	0.11%
Asian alone (NH)	220	0.37%
Native Hawaiian or Pacific Islander alone (NH)	10	0.02%
Other race alone (NH)	298	0.50%
Mixed race or Multiracial (NH)	1,471	2.49%
Hispanic or Latino (any race)	1,635	2.76%
White alone (NH)	1,394	2.35%
Total	59,194	100.00%

=== 2019 estimates ===
Stonecrest in 2019 had a median household income of $49,865, 18.6% of the population lived in poverty, the median property value in the city was $111,400, and 43.3% of the population owned homes.

== Places of interest ==
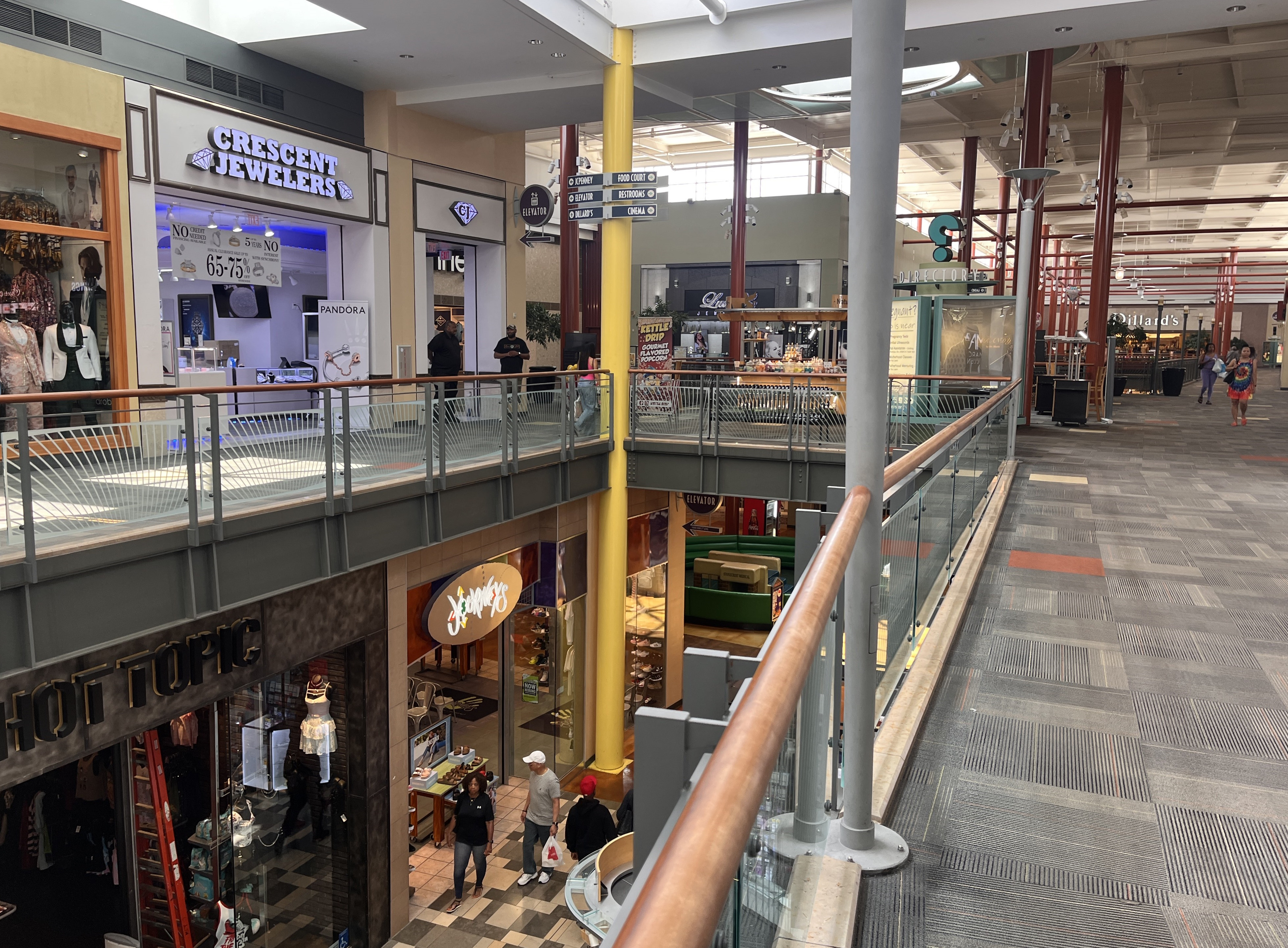
Stonecrest Mall 2023

=== The Mall at Stonecrest ===
The Mall at Stonecrest opened in 2001 and is home to over 100 stores and eateries.

=== Flat Rock Archives ===
The Flat Rock Archives is an African American museum which mission is to preserve the rural African American history in Georgia.

=== Arabia Mountain ===
Arabia Mountain is a part of the Arabia Mountain National Heritage Area and is the northern of two peaks in the Davidson-Arabia Mountain Nature Preserve.

== Education ==
The DeKalb County School District is the area school district.

Elementary schools serving parts of Stonecrest and located in Stonecrest include: Murphy Candler, Fairington, Flat Rock, Panola Way, and Stoneview. Parts are also in the Redan, Princeton, and Rock Chapel elementary zones.

Middle schools serving parts of Stonecrest include Salem Middle School (in Stonecrest), Lithonia Middle School (in Lithonia), and Miller Grove Middle School (near Stonecrest).

High schools serving parts of Stonecrest include Lithonia High School (in Stonecrest), Miller Grove High School (in Stonecrest), and Martin Luther King High School (across from Stonecrest).

A magnet school, Arabia Mountain High School, is in Stonecrest.

Luther Rice College & Seminary is in Stonecrest.
