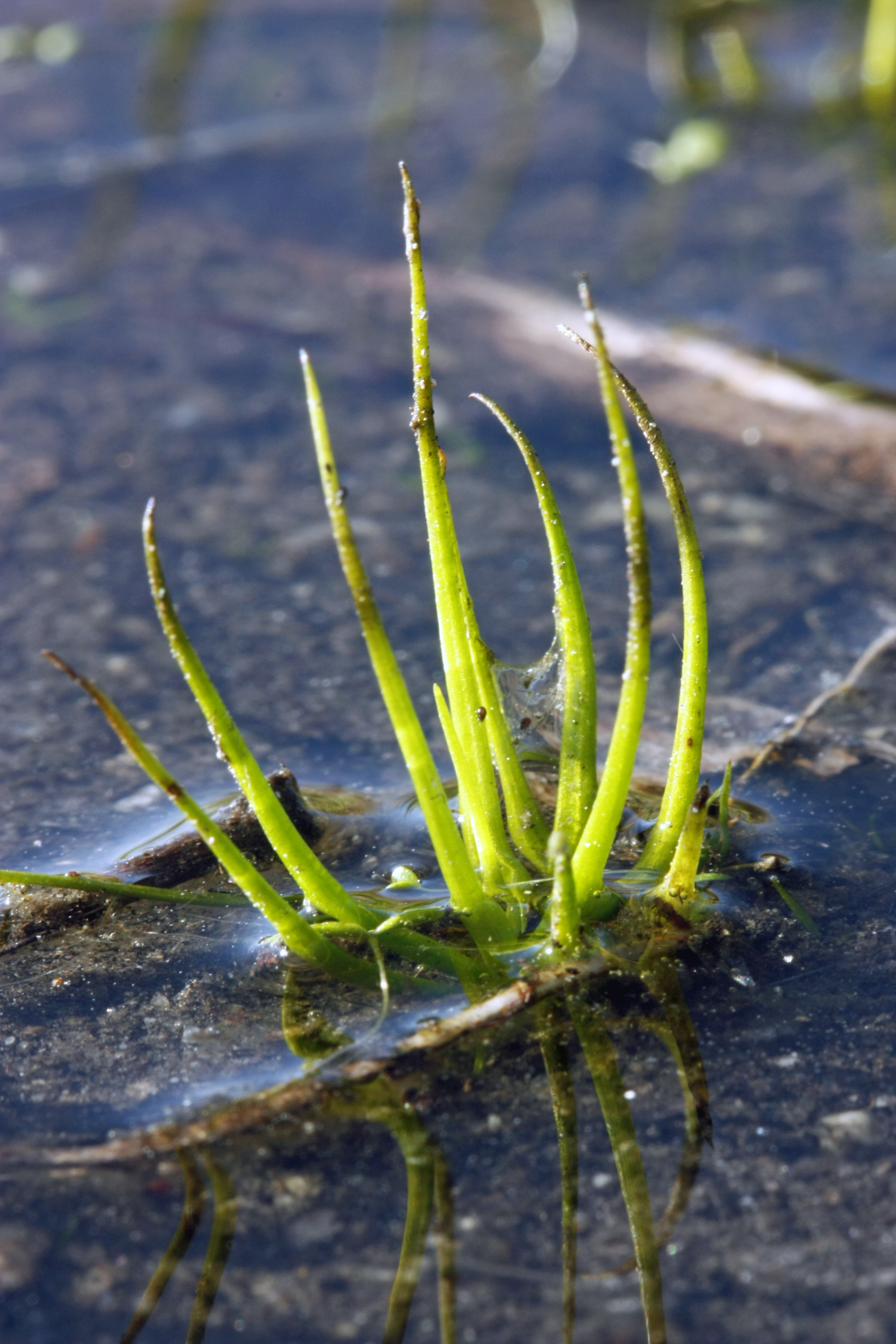

Conservation status
- Critically Imperiled (NatureServe)

Scientific classification
- Kingdom: Plantae
- Clade: Tracheophytes
- Clade: Lycophytes
- Class: Lycopodiopsida
- Order: Isoetales
- Family: Isoetaceae
- Genus: Isoetes
- Species: I. melanospora

Binomial name
- Isoetes melanospora Engelm.

Synonyms
- Isoëtes melanospora Engelm.; Calamaria melanospora (Engelm.) Kuntze

= Isoetes melanospora =

Southeastern US species of quillwort

Isoetes melanospora, commonly known as black-spored quillwort or black-spored Merlin's grass, is a rare and endangered aquatic lycophyte endemic to the U.S. states of Georgia and South Carolina.

== Habitat ==
It grows exclusively in shallow, temporary pools on granite outcrops, often with only 2 cm of soil. 11 populations are known to exist in Georgia, while only one has been recorded in South Carolina, though this population is believed to be extirpated. The number of sites has dropped from 18 following its discovery due to habitat destruction caused by quarrying, trash dumping and trampling. New leaves quickly sprout after fall and winter rains, but during the dry summer months these typically shrivel.

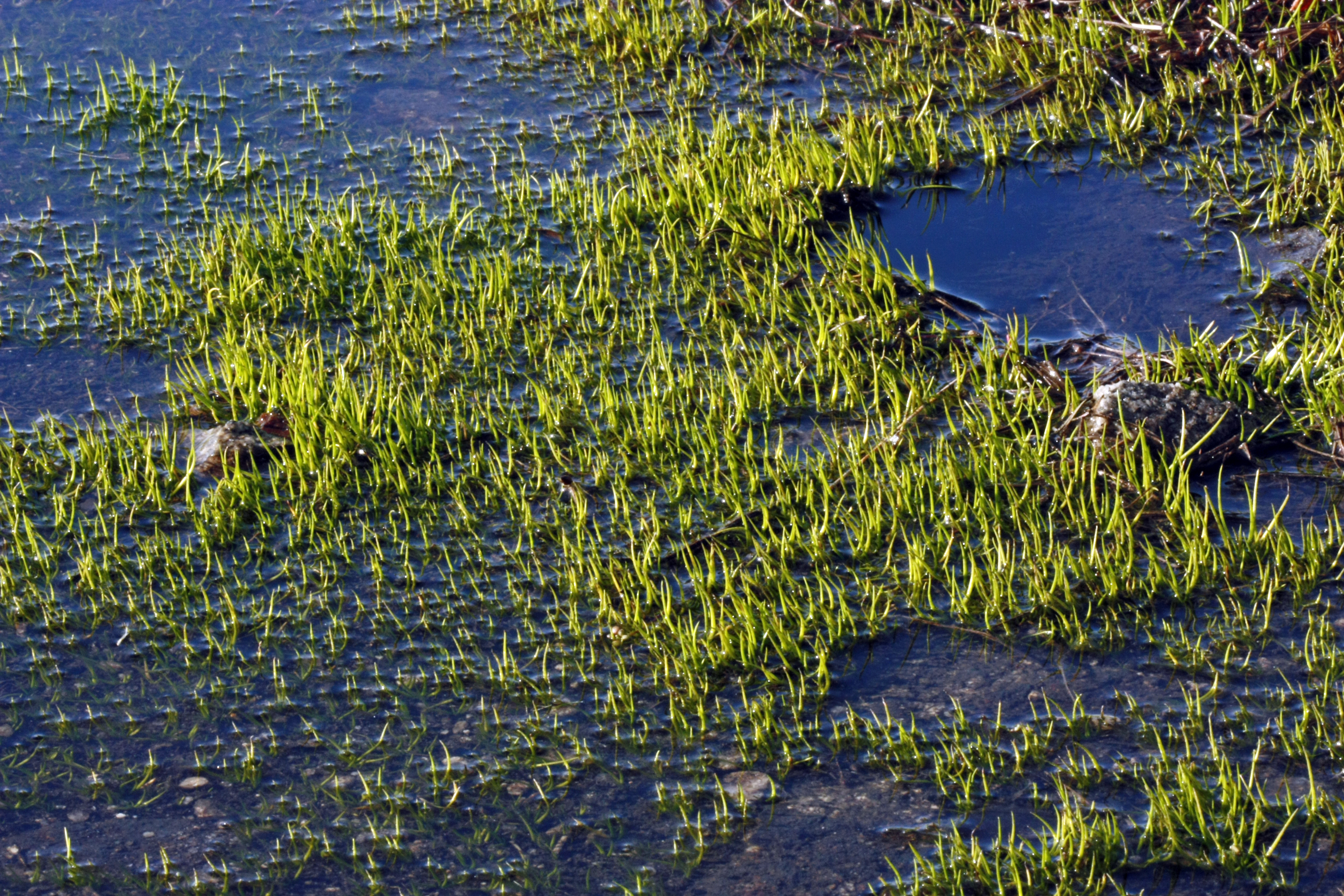
Colony of black-spored quillwort on Arabia Mountain, GA

The black-spored quillwort, a federally listed endangered species, is sometimes found growing with pool sprite (Amphianthus pusillus), another imperiled plant species. Both are protected at Stone Mountain in Georgia.

== Description ==
Isoetes melanospora is a small plant growing in mud or shallow water but becoming terrestrial as the ground dries. Rootstock is nearly spherical. Leaves are up to 7 cm (2.8 inches) long, spirally arranged, tapering to the tip. Megaspores are gray or black, 350-480 μm in diameter. Microspores appear brown, each 26-31 μm across.
