= Flat Rock Archives =

Archives in Stonecrest, Georgia, USA

Coordinates: 33°39′53.4″N 84°9′42.4″W

The Flat Rock Archive is an African American historical museum located in the city of Stonecrest, Georgia. The mission of the archive is to preserve rural African American history in Georgia. The archive is located in a historic home built by T.A. Bryant, Sr., and was donated in 2005, by Rev. T.A. Bryant, Jr. and his sister, Zudia Guthrie, to preserve and store all the Flat Rock records and documents. It was established as a museum and resource to genealogical and historical research, as well as a heritage tourism site. The Flat Rock Archives consists of a variety of historic sites, including the Flat Rock African American Historic Cemetery.

== History ==
Since 1981, inspired by the stories of elders, a vision emerged to preserve the African American history of the Flat Rock community. In December 2006, the Flat Rock Archives opened to the public. Cheryl Moore-Mathis is the current president of the Archives.

In 2006, the Flat Rock Archives was part of a segment on African American Lives, episode "Listening to Our Past," featuring Chris Tucker.

== The Flat Rock Archive Goal of Preserving Memories ==
One goal of the Flat Rock Archives is to preserve the memories of the Flat Rock community. President of the archive, Cheryl Mathis-Moore wants the sounds, memories, and stories to be preserved and heard for generations to come.

In an Atlanta Journal Constitution article from 2005, Cleveland McMullen (aged 83 at the time) shared that he grew up in Flat Rock and joined the exodus of thousands of Southern blacks who fled to the North during the Great Depression to find jobs in factories and escape enforced segregation. He recalled that Flat Rock had its own "scout" team (baseball), which played rivals from nearby communities, such as Lithonia, and, toward Atlanta, Edgewood. But McMullen can't recall the team name of the home nine; it was just that "it was a big deal, people came from all over. They'd have a barbecue, make a whole day of it."

== The Flat Rock Historical Landscape ==
The Archive sits within a historical landscape and currently maintains the 20th-century Georgian Cottage known as the T.A. Bryant, Sr. House, built in 1917. The T.A. Bryant, Sr. house was donated to the Archives by T.A. Bryant, Sr.'s son and Co-Founder T.A. Bryant, Jr. The site also includes a barn, smokehouse, and outhouse constructed throughout the 20th century.

The historical landscape also includes the Historical African American Flat Rock Cemetery. According to Dr. Jeffrey Glover of Georgia State University's 2008 cemetery mapping project, there are approximately 202 graves, with 107 being unidentified fieldstones.

== Community outreach ==
The Flat Rock Archive is collecting and preserving a wide range of archival material, including genealogical records, newspaper articles, photographs, maps, church records, school records, rare books, and tangible artifacts related to African-American history in the rural South.

The Archive also owns and maintains the Historic African American Flat Rock Cemetery located in Stonecrest, GA.
