= Panola Mountain =

Mountain in Georgia, United States

Panola Mountain State Park
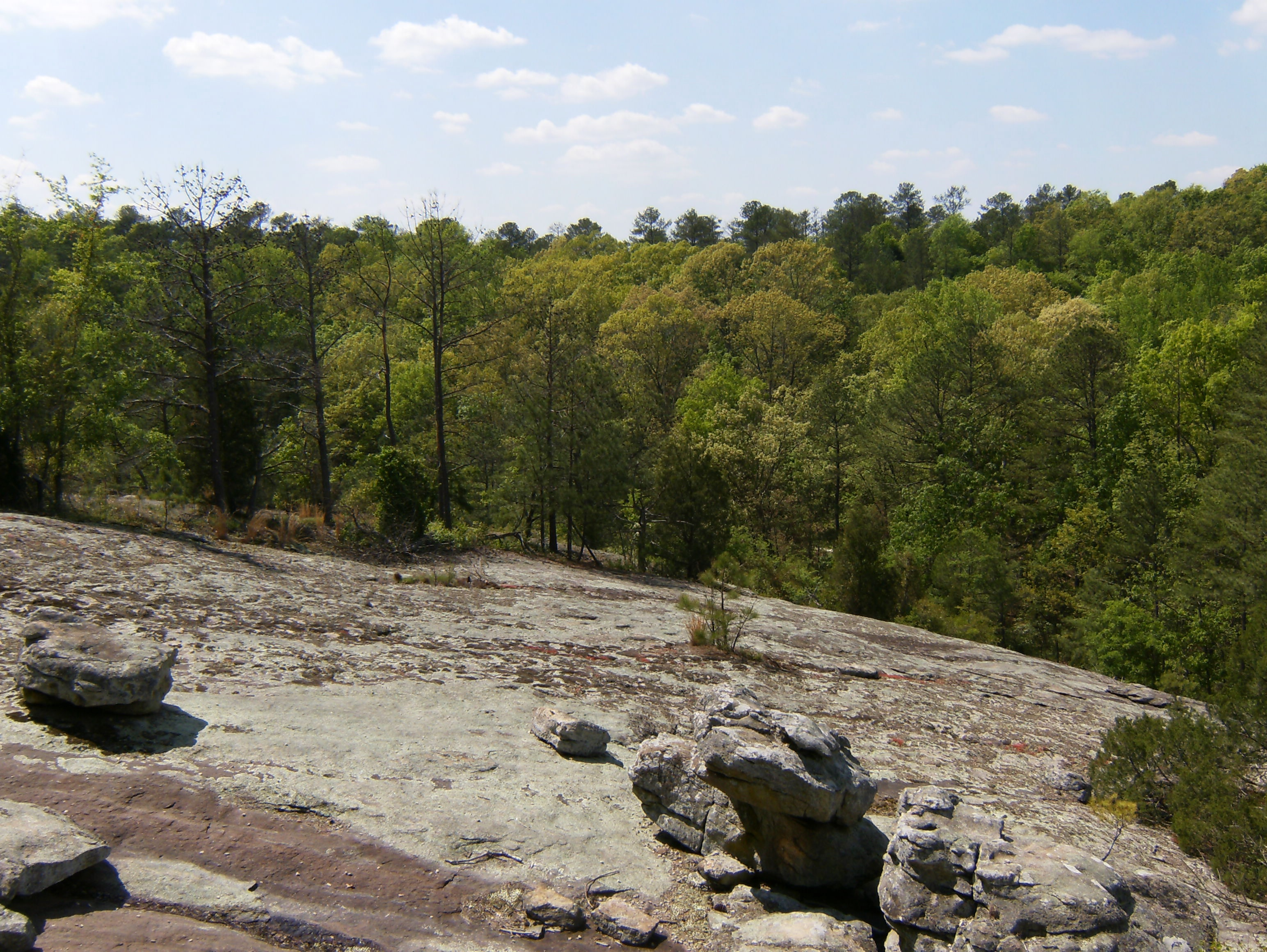
- Granite outcrop, Panola Mountain

- Location within Metro Atlanta Location within Georgia Location within the United States
- Location: Stockbridge, Georgia
- Coordinates: 33°38′7″N 84°10′13″W
- Area: 1,635 acres (6.62 km^{2})
- Website: http://gastateparks.org/info/panolamt/

U.S. National Natural Landmark
- Designated: 1980

Panola Mountain is a 100-acre (40 ha) granite monadnock in Rockdale County, Georgia. The peak is 946 feet (288 m) above sea level, rising 260 feet (79 m) above the South River. The South River marks the boundary between Henry, Rockdale, and DeKalb counties. Due to its delicate ecological features, Panola Mountain was designated a National Natural Landmark on December 16, 1980.
