= MLW =

MLW, or mlw, may refer to:

== Professional Wrestling ==
- Maple Leaf Wrestling
- Major League Wrestling

== Transportation ==
- Maximum landing weight, the maximum weight at which an aircraft is permitted to land
- MLW, the IATA code for Spriggs Payne Airport near Monrovia in Liberia
- MLW, the National Rail code for Marlow railway station in the county of Buckinghamshire, UK
- Montreal Locomotive Works, a former Canadian railway locomotive manufacturer

== Other uses ==
- Major League Wiffle (MLW)
- Malawi, UNDP country code
- Master of Labour Welfare, a postgraduate degree course offered by some Indian Universities
- mlw, the ISO 639-3 code for the Moloko language spoken in northern Cameroon
