= Wiffle ball =

Variation of baseball using a plastic bat and ball

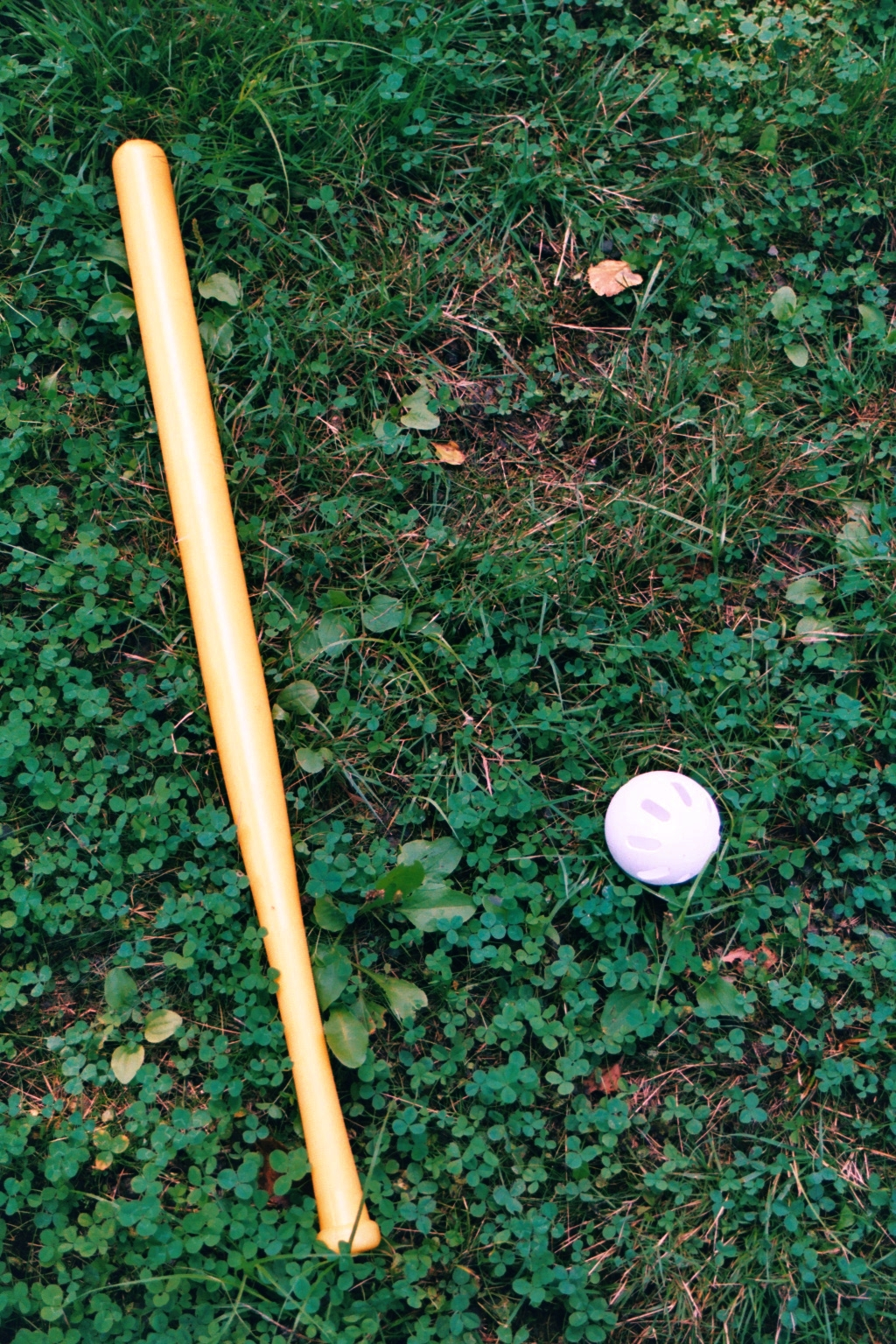
A Wiffle bat and ball

Wiffle ball is a scaled back variation of baseball that was developed in 1953 in Fairfield, Connecticut. Originally, it was intended to be played in confined space or otherwise small area, but became a popular outdoor activity. The sport is played using a perforated light-weight plastic ball and a long hollow plastic bat. Two teams of one to five players each attempt to advance runners to home plate, and score, based on where each batter places the ball on the field. The term Wiffle ball may refer to the sport as a whole, or the ball used in the sport. Wiffle is a registered trademark of Wiffle Ball, Inc. and was derived from the slang word whiff meaning to strike out swinging.

== History ==
Miniature versions of baseball have been played for decades, including stickball, improvised by children, using everything from rolled up socks to tennis balls. The ball most commonly used in the game was invented by David N. Mullany at his home in Fairfield, Connecticut, in 1953 when he designed a ball that curved easily for his 12-year-old son. It was named when his son and his friends would refer to a strikeout as a "whiff". The Wiffle Ball is about the same size as a regulation baseball, but is hollow, lightweight, of resilient plastic, and no more than 1/8 inch (3.2 mm) thick. One half is perforated with eight .75-inch (19 mm) oblong holes; the other half is non-perforated. This construction allows pitchers to throw curveballs and risers.

In April 2011, the Health Department of the State of New York included wiffle ball on a list of recreational activities that present a "significant risk of injury" to children. Under a state law passed in 2009, any program for children that included two or more such activities would be defined as a "summer camp" subject to government regulation. The story became a frequent source of ridicule and amusement, with Parenting.com sarcastically commenting, "According to new legislation introduced in New York State, to survive classic schoolyard games like capture the flag is to cheat death." Wiffle Ball executives originally thought the order was a joke, because the company has never been sued over any safety issues in its 50+ year history. The disapproval of people from across the nation pressured the New York legislature to remove wiffle ball and other items such as archery and scuba diving from the list of risky activities.

== Game ==
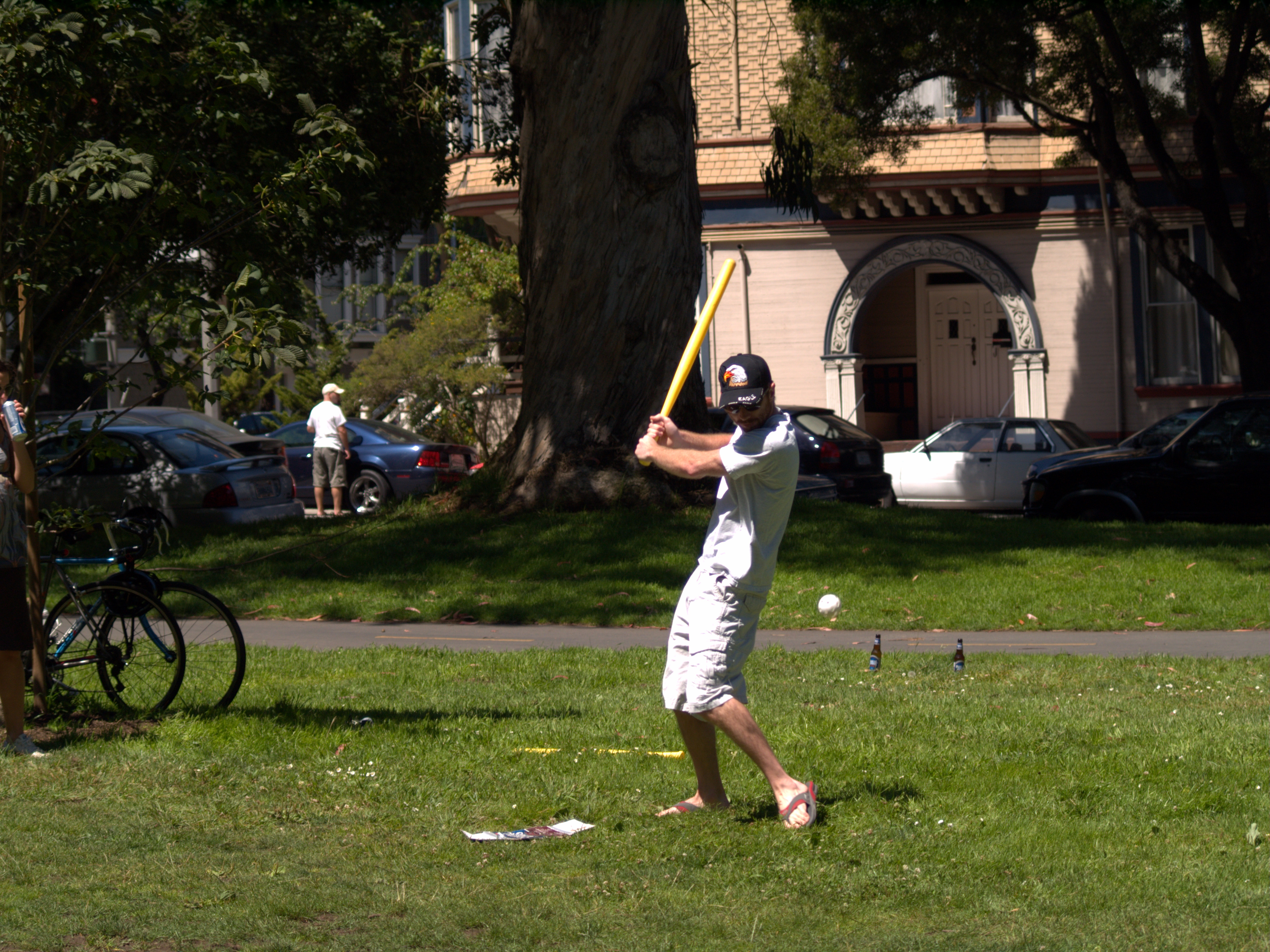
Wiffle ball being played in a park

Wiffle ball is a simplified version of the game of baseball that is designed to be a miniature version of the game that is suitable to be played both indoor and outdoors, often in confined spaces. Because of this, the rules of wiffle ball are very alike to baseball. A single game of wiffle ball consists of however many innings the players set.

A playing field is not necessary, but if a field is marked, it is shaped like an isosceles triangle. The batter stands at the top of the triangle looking down the two equal sides that are about 60 feet in length. A ball hit about thirty feet counts as a "single" and a ball hit about 45 feet counts as a "double". When a ball is hit outside of the sides of the triangle, it counts as a foul ball. The line across the bottom of the triangle is about twenty feet in length, and a ball hit across this line counts as a "home run". Scoring of this game is similar to scoring in baseball as are the terms used, i.e., "single", "double", "foul ball" and "home run". However, there is no running around bases for the batter(s), and there is no chasing the ball for the pitcher and fielders.

The objective for each team in Wiffle ball is to score more runs than their opponent, thus winning the game. Once both teams have completed their agreed number of innings (usually six) or time limit has been reached, the team with the highest number of runs will be declared the winner. Should the number of runs be the same at the end of the game then the game is drawn. Some Wiffle ball leagues allow tied games and the points are shared equally by the two teams whereas others will insist on one more innings each, with the highest score being declared the winner.

=== Wiffle beer ===
Another version of the game, called wiffle-beer, has become increasingly popular among college students. All regular wiffle ball rules apply, with the main difference being each player must hold a can of beer while batting and while in the outfield, with the runner needing to finish the beer before reaching home plate or the run does not count. Wiffle-beer is usually played 18 innings instead of the traditional 9 innings.

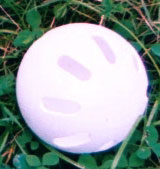
A wiffle ball, showing the perforated half

== Tournaments ==
Wiffle ball tournaments have been held in the United States and Europe since 1977. That year, Rick Ferroli began holding tournaments in his backyard tribute to Fenway Park in Hanover, Massachusetts. In 1980, the World Wiffle Ball Championship was established in Mishawaka, Indiana by Jim Bottorff and Larry Grau. With the explosion of the Internet in the 1990s, there are now hundreds of Wiffle ball tournaments played in the United States, most in the same place every year, with a few tournament "circuits".

The NWLA (National Wiffle League Association) tournament is held in various Midwestern and Mid-Atlantic locations, which change on an annual basis. The tournament crowns a champion from a field of all-star teams from leagues across the country.

Several organizations such as FastPlastic and Golden Stick have hosted recognized tournaments in the past. Currently, United Wiffle has held a tournament since 2020 in York, Pennsylvania.

The World Wiffle Ball Championship remains the oldest tournament in the nation, having moved to the Chicago suburbs in 2013, and to Crown Point, Indiana in 2024, after introducing regional stops over three decades in Baltimore; Los Angeles; Indianapolis; Eugene, Oregon; and Barcelona, Spain. The tournament is featured at #27 in the book, 101 Baseball Places to Visit Before You Strike Out.

== Leagues ==
There are many competitive Wiffle ball leagues in the United States, including Major League Wiffle Ball at the forefront. Other prominent leagues include AWA Wiffle Ball, Bay City Wiffle Ball, United States Wiffle League, Kalamazoo Wiffle Ball League, Skibbe Wiffle ball League, The HRL, NWA Wiffle Ball, Big League Wiffle Ball, Mid-Atlantic Wiffle, and Windy City Wiffleball, Minor league wiffle ball located in Rochester.

AWA Wiffle Ball launched in 2020 in a backyard in Edmonds, Washington, where the eight-team league remains based; over the course of the next four years, it expanded in popularity through its social media presence, airing live games on TikTok and later YouTube.

MLW was established by Kyle Schultz in Brighton, Michigan in 2009. The league consists of eight teams, which are the Coastal Cobras, Downtown Diamondbacks, Eastern Eagles, Great Lakes Gators, Metro Magic, Midwest Mallards, Pacific Predators, and Western Wildcats.

MLW has a strong following on social media, uploads highlights of all of their games to YouTube, and has also hosted open public tournaments in 8 different states (Michigan, Ohio, Arizona, Texas, Illinois, New York, Massachusetts, and Pennsylvania). The league gained significant attention throughout its 2020 season, after several other professional sports were postponed or cancelled due to the COVID-19 pandemic. The league has been featured by TBS, The Athletic, Whistle Sports, and twice been highlighted on ESPN's SportsCenter Top 10 Plays. They also have played games in states other than Michigan, in which they have played games in Oklahoma, Ohio, Vermont, California, Pennsylvania, Missouri, Georgia, Florida, New York, Illinois, Texas, and Maryland. Notable venues they have played in include Fifth Third Field, home of the Toledo Mud Hens, and a Wiffle ball field at Citizens Bank Park in Philadelphia, home of the Phillies. In 2022, MLW began playing their World Series games at neutral sites, where they played at SoFi Stadium in Los Angeles, home of the NFL's Los Angeles Rams and Los Angeles Chargers, for the 2022 World Series, where the Diamondbacks swept the Cobras in 3 to win their second straight title. That event was without fans unlike the 2023 World Series, which was held at Mercedes-Benz Stadium in Atlanta, home of the NFL's Atlanta Falcons and the MLS Atlanta United. In that series, the Magic came back from a 2–0 deficit in the series to win their first World Series title over the Eagles. In 2024, the World Series was held at AT&T Stadium in Dallas. In that series, the Eagles got revenge from their 2023 World Series loss when they swept the Predators in three games to win their first title since 2016. In 2025, the World Series was held at George C. Page Stadium on the campus of Loyola Marymount University in Los Angeles. In that series, the Mallards defeated the Gators in five games to win their first title since 2017. Most recently, in 2026, the World Series was held at Lindsey Nelson Stadium on the campus of the University of Tennessee in Knoxvile. In that series, the Magic defeated the Cobras in four games to win their second title in four years.

The name has also been associated with a small league in the southwestern Illinois city of Granite City, which has come to be a hub of the sport with the Lakeside Kings having won multiple world championships in the Wiffle Ball National Championship Series. The League's inaugural national championship was held in October 2001 in Granite City, whose wiffle only stadium has long been known for its similarity to Fenway Park and Busch Stadium. The national championship was launched following a decade long increase in interest in the sport, among fans and players of all ages.

As of 2015, there was also a sixty player league in Havre de Grace, Maryland, which featured former NBA player Gary Neal.

Big League Wiffle Ball, based out of Arizona, started a league in 2025 that would be played over the course of several of their tournaments, which would have teams owned by many famous individuals, including Kevin Costner and Dude Perfect. The league would later get a sponsorship from Fanatics.

== Fields ==
Some wiffle ball players have built fields to resemble major league ballparks. Thomas P. Hannon, Jr. authored a book, Backyard Ball, on his experiences building a smaller version of Ebbets Field. Patrick M. O'Connor wrote a book, Little Fenway, about building his versions of Fenway Park and Wrigley Field. But not all Wiffle ball fields have been modeled from major league ball parks. Some have created original fields, Strawberry Field in Encino, California being the most exquisite. Rick Messina spent over $700,000 constructing Strawberry Field, which features lights for night games, bleachers, and a press box. He also converted a neighboring house into a clubhouse/pub.

Building fields can lead to controversy and legal issues. In 2008, The New York Times published an article about Greenwich, Connecticut teenagers who were forced by the city to tear down a Wiffle ball field they had built because of neighbor complaints.

== In popular culture ==
In 1965 a Wiffle ball was initially used when developing the sport of pickleball, but it was eventually replaced with a more durable ball.

In his 2003 book The Complete Far Side, cartoonist Gary Larson reproduces a letter he received after including a "wiffle swatter" in his cartoon. The letter contains language from Wiffle Ball Incorporated's attorneys: "In the future, when you use the brand name WIFFLE, the entire brand should be capitalized, and it should only be used in reference to a product currently manufactured by The Wiffle Ball, Inc." In 2009, video game developer Skyworks Technologies released a game based on Wiffle ball, simply titled Wiffle Ball.

In science, a Wiffle ball is frequently used by marine biologists as a size reference in photos to measure corals and other objects.

ESPN8 The Ocho has carried Wiffle ball contests from various leagues, including the MLW, AWA, National Wiffle Leagues Association and Big League Wiffleball.

== See also ==
- Blitzball (sport)
