= Mercedes-Benz Stadium =

Stadium in Atlanta, Georgia, U.S.

- The Benz

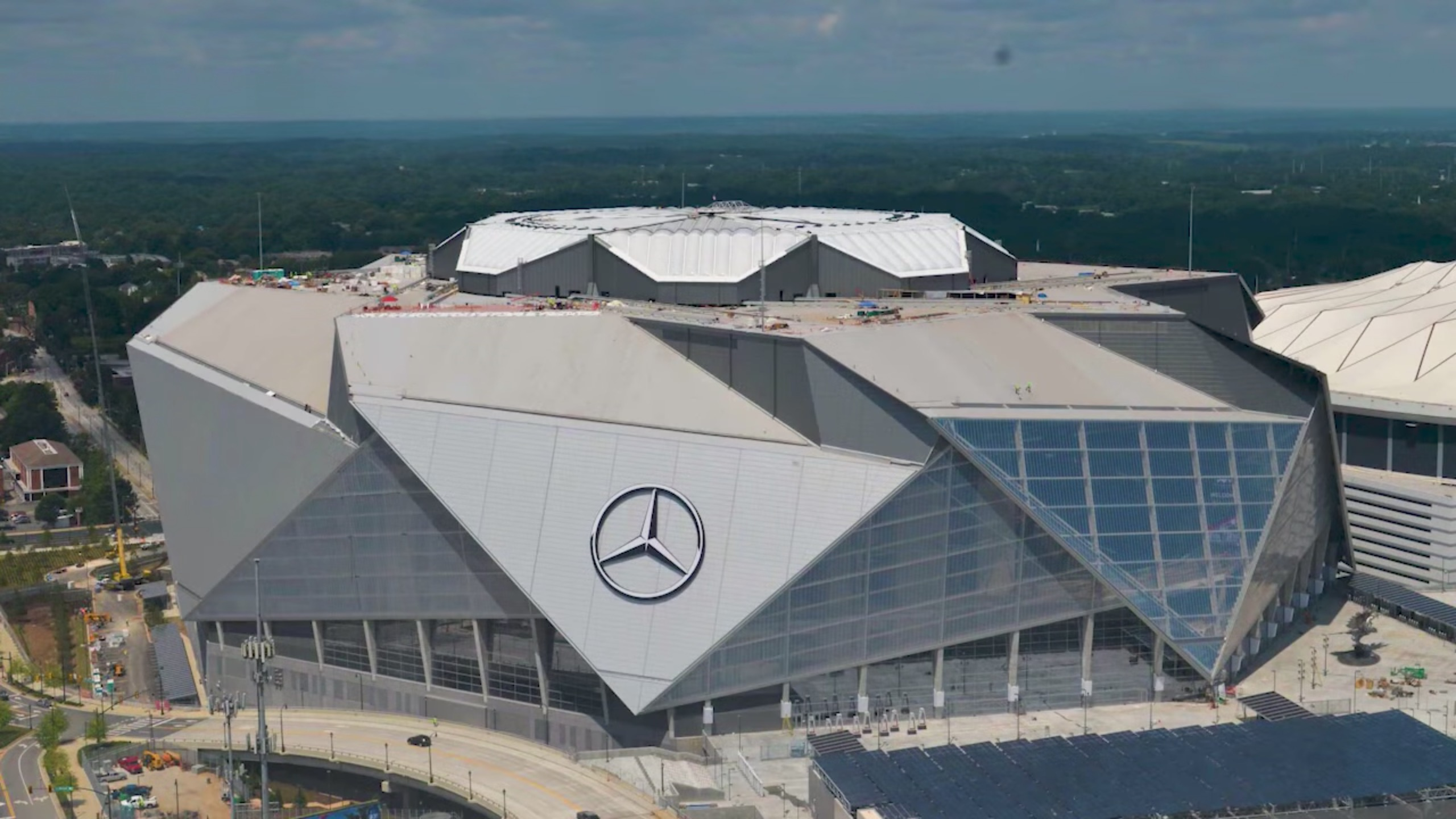
- The stadium in 2017

- Location in Atlanta Location in the Atlanta metro area Location in Georgia Location in the United States
- Former names: New Atlanta Stadium (construction); Atlanta Stadium (2026 FIFA World Cup)
- Address: 1 AMB Drive Northwest
- Location: Atlanta, Georgia, U.S.
- Coordinates: 33°45′20″N 84°24′00″W
- Owner: Georgia World Congress Center Authority
- Operator: AMB Sports and Entertainment Group
- Capacity: American football: 71,000 (Expandable to 75,000); Soccer: 42,500 (Expandable to 71,000, standing room to at least 73,019)
- Executive suites: 190
- Roof: Retractable
- Surface: FieldTurf CORE
- Record attendance: American Football: 79,330 (2022 Peach Bowl, December 31, 2022); Soccer: 73,019 (2018 MLS Cup, December 8, 2018)
- Field size: American football: 120 yd × 53.333 yd (109.7 m × 48.8 m); Soccer: 115 yd × 75 yd (105 m × 69 m)
- Public transit: MARTA Green Line Blue Line at Vine City and SEC District

Construction
- Groundbreaking: May 19, 2014; 12 years ago
- Opened: August 26, 2017; 9 years ago
- Cost: US$1.6 billion (projected)($2.1 billion in 2025 dollars)
- Architects: HOK subsidiary 360 Architecture tvsdesign Goode Van Slyke; Stanley Beaman & Sears
- Project managers: Darden & Company
- Structural engineer: BuroHappold Engineering/Hoberman
- Services engineer: WSP
- General contractors: HHRM JV (Comprising Hunt Construction Group, Holder Construction, H. J. Russell & Co. & C. D. Moody Construction Co.)

Tenants
- Atlanta Falcons (NFL) 2017–present; Atlanta United FC (MLS) 2017–present; Peach Bowl (NCAA) 2017–present; Celebration Bowl (NCAA) 2017–present; Aflac Kickoff Game (NCAA) 2017–present

Website
- mercedesbenzstadium.com

Mercedes-Benz Stadium is a retractable roof stadium in Atlanta, Georgia, United States. Opened in 2017 as a replacement for the Georgia Dome, it is the home to the Atlanta Falcons of the National Football League (NFL), Atlanta United FC of Major League Soccer (MLS), and Atlanta City FC of the National Women's Soccer League (NWSL) in 2028. The stadium is owned by the state of Georgia through the Georgia World Congress Center Authority, and operated by AMB Group, the parent organization of the Falcons and Atlanta United FC. In 2016, the total cost of its construction was estimated at US$1.6 billion.

The stadium officially opened on August 26, 2017. Several events formerly held at the Georgia Dome moved to Mercedes-Benz Stadium following its completion, including multiple college football events, such as the SEC football championship game, the Peach Bowl, and the College Football Playoff National Championship (2018, 2025). Other professional events included the MLS Cup (as Atlanta United FC held home field advantage) in 2018, and Super Bowl LIII in 2019. Mercedes-Benz Stadium will host Super Bowl LXII in 2028. It also hosted several matches during the 2026 FIFA World Cup, most notably the semi-final match between England and Argentina.

== Design ==
=== Roof ===
Atlanta Falcon sculpture outside the stadium

The stadium's signature feature is its retractable roof, which features a "pinwheel" consisting of eight translucent, triangular panels. Each of the eight panels operates on two straight, parallel rails; one rail is responsible for moving the panel while the other rail stabilizes the panel. Closing the roof takes slightly less time than opening the roof, since the roof has to disengage the seals at the start of the opening procedure and slow down towards the end to prevent the panels from getting derailed. When opened, the panels are designed to create the illusion of a bird's wings extended.

Architect Bill Johnson explained that the circular opening in the roof was inspired by the Roman Pantheon ("Pantheon" was also the working name for the building design). The roof was designed to be made of a clear, lightweight polymer material that can adjust its opacity to control light, and much of the exterior is clear polymer or glass to allow views to the outside. The middle concourse and upper bowl were eliminated in the east end zone to allow for an unobstructed view of the Atlanta skyline.

Below the roof is the "Halo", a 58-by-1,100-foot (18 by 335 m), ring-shaped video board around its rim. Covering a total area of 62,350 square feet (5,793 m^{2}), it was described by manufacturer Daktronics as being "three times as large as the current largest single display board in the NFL" installed at EverBank Stadium in Jacksonville (also built by Daktronics). Daktronics also installed more than 20,000 square feet (1,900 m^{2}) of other LED boards, including field-level advertising boards for soccer games.

The stadium's roof can be kept open under light precipitation, as the electrical systems for all video boards in the stadium are outdoor-rated, and the field has a drainage system. AMB Group senior executive Mike Egan went as far as describing Mercedes-Benz Stadium as "an outdoor stadium with a roof over it" due to these characteristics, but that other factors such as humidity and outside temperatures would be taken into consideration on whether or not the roof would be opened.

=== Interior ===
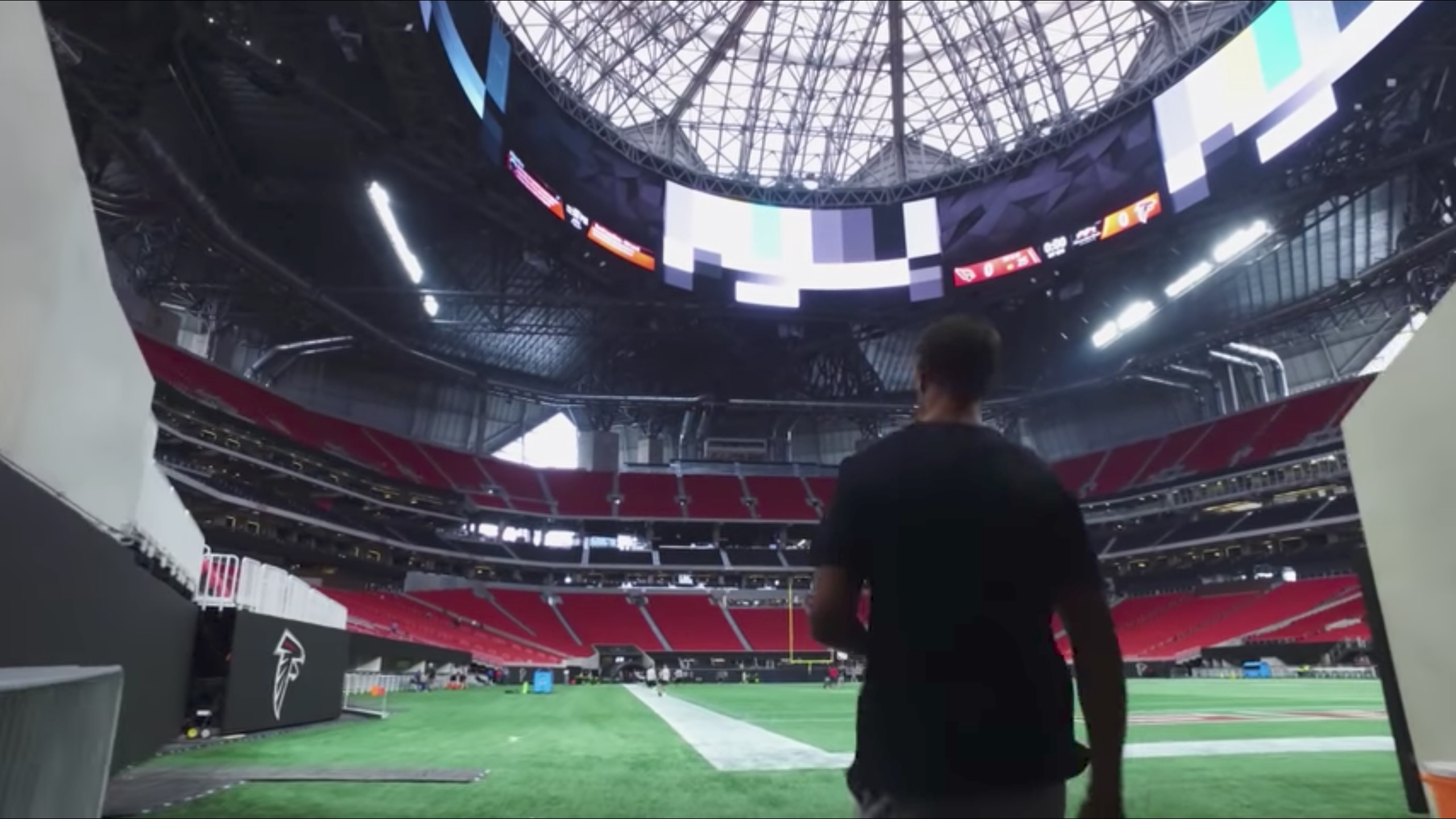
Interior of the stadium in August 2017

The stadium also includes features specific for college football use. It opened with two oversized locker rooms, each capable of housing 100 players, reflecting the much larger size of college football rosters compared to those of the NFL. However, the stadium did not initially include another feature important in that context—staircases connecting the seats to the field, making it difficult for bands to enter the field for halftime shows (most NFL teams, including the Falcons, do not have bands). It also has a soccer-specific configuration, with retractable lower bowl seats to widen the field, and mechanized curtains that limit the capacity to about 42,500.

The stadium incorporates contemporary art into its interior and exterior design, with over 180 commissioned works, including pieces by Nari Ward, Hank Willis Thomas, Gregory Eltringham, and Steven and William Ladd. The centerpiece of the art collection is Gábor Miklós Szőke's stainless steel sculpture The Atlanta Falcon, which the artist said is the largest freestanding bird sculpture in the world. The falcon, perched atop a 13 foot (4.0 m) tall bronze football, is 41 feet (12 m) high with a wingspan of 70 feet (21 m). The sculpture stands in front of the stadium, weighs over 73,000 pounds (33,000 kg), and is as tall as a four-story building.

=== Amenities ===
The upper concourse includes an area known as the "100 Yard Club", a concession and gathering area that stretches the length of the football field. Other noted areas include the "AT&T Perch"—a gathering area with televisions and video walls airing other games (designed as being of interest to fantasy football players), and the "Budweiser Biergarten". Several "neighborhood bars" also operate within the stadium. The former Georgia Dome site between the stadium and the Georgia World Congress Center was redeveloped as "The Home Depot Backyard"—an 11-acre (4.5 ha) green space used as a tailgating area. It also features a 3-tier, dual-level, shaded deck pavilion.

For its concessions, Mercedes-Benz Stadium focused primarily on the quality and speed of service, variety, and pricing; the stadium includes at least 670 points-of-sale, and has a policy of "fan first pricing" for all concessions—with lower menu prices in comparison to other sports facilities during all events regardless of stature, such as a US$2 beverage cup with free refills, and a $5 beer. To increase the speed of service, all items were priced at whole dollars only, with the 9.3% sales tax already included in the posted menu prices (rather than added at the time of purchase). The practice helped to increase the venue's revenue, as the lower prices have been offset by increased spending on concessions by attendees.

In March 2019, following a trial in 2018, the stadium became one of the first major professional sports venues in the United States to only accept "cashless" payment methods for transactions at concessions inside the stadium, such as credit or debit cards, and mobile payments. This only applies to concessions; cash is still accepted for ticket sales and any third-party merchandising that may operate during events, and kiosks are provided for loading cash onto prepaid debit cards (with no transaction fees charged). At the same time, the stadium raised all menu prices, by adding tax at the time of purchase but maintaining the same posted price values as before (besides five items, such as hot dogs, whose list prices were discounted by 50 cents).

To reflect local culture, the stadium also partnered with Atlanta-based restaurants, chains, and chefs to have presences as concessions under the "Best of Atlanta" banner, including Chick-fil-A, The Varsity, Kevin Gillespie, and others. In keeping with the fan first pricing policy, these partners agreed to not mark up their prices in comparison to their standalone locations. As with all other locations under a long-standing corporate policy, the Chick-fil-A does not operate on Sundays despite the stadium's main tenant primarily playing on Sundays. During Sunday events, the Chick-fil-A stand is replaced by an unbranded "Fries Up" stand operated by Levy Restaurants.

In 2023, the stadium adopted the NFL's clear bag policy. An advisory was issued detailing permissible sizes for clear bags, including diaper bags.

== History ==
=== Planning ===
In May 2010, it was reported by multiple news outlets that the Atlanta Falcons were interested in replacing the Georgia Dome with a newly constructed open-air stadium, although at the time it was planned to retain the Georgia Dome to continue hosting non-NFL events. The team was pursuing a new stadium because of the team's desire to play outdoors, as well as Falcons team owner Arthur Blank's interest in hosting another Super Bowl. The stadium was also pursued as a possible bid for a venue of an upcoming FIFA World Cup. Kansas City-based architectural firm Populous released comprehensive plans for the proposed stadium in February 2011. Populous' early cost estimate for the project was US$700 million. According to the master plan, the stadium would have a regular capacity of 71,000, but could expand to 75,000 for special events such as the Super Bowl. It would also feature multiple club levels, suites and exhibition area.

In April 2012, Populous released a new price estimate of US$947.7 million, which was significantly higher than the previous proposal of US$700 million. In April 2012, The Atlanta Journal-Constitution reported that if a deal was reached, the new stadium's construction would be expected to begin in 2014, with the Falcons to begin regular-season play in 2017. The proposed location of the new stadium was a large parking lot in Atlanta's Vine City neighborhood, which was less than a mile north of the Georgia Dome's location. Once construction was complete, the Georgia Dome would subsequently be demolished.

On August 24, The Atlanta Journal-Constitution reported that an official deal could be reached on the construction of a new stadium by the end of 2012. They also reported on September 10 that Atlanta mayor Kasim Reed said site improvements could likely bump the total cost to US$1.2 billion; however, that did not increase the actual building cost, which still remained at an estimated US$948 million.

The future site of Mercedes-Benz Stadium, then a parking lot for the Georgia Dome, in 2011

On December 10, the Georgia World Congress Center Authority, in a unanimous decision, approved the blueprint and most of the agreement terms for the new stadium plans. According to The Atlanta Journal-Constitution article, the term sheet is non-binding and changes could be made at any time as regards stadium construction. Stadium location, however, is yet to be worked out; proposed locations being reported are within walking distance of the Georgia Dome, with one site located one-half mile north, and the other one block directly south, at one of the stadium's existing parking lots. The project made national headlines for the first time in 2012 on December 15, with team owner Arthur Blank stating in The New York Times that he would rather have a new stadium be constructed than a "remodeling job" of the Georgia Dome. During a January 10, 2013, press conference, mayor Reed expressed his optimism and confidence in the construction of the new stadium; he also mentioned the possibility of the new stadium helping the city compete for its first Major League Soccer team.

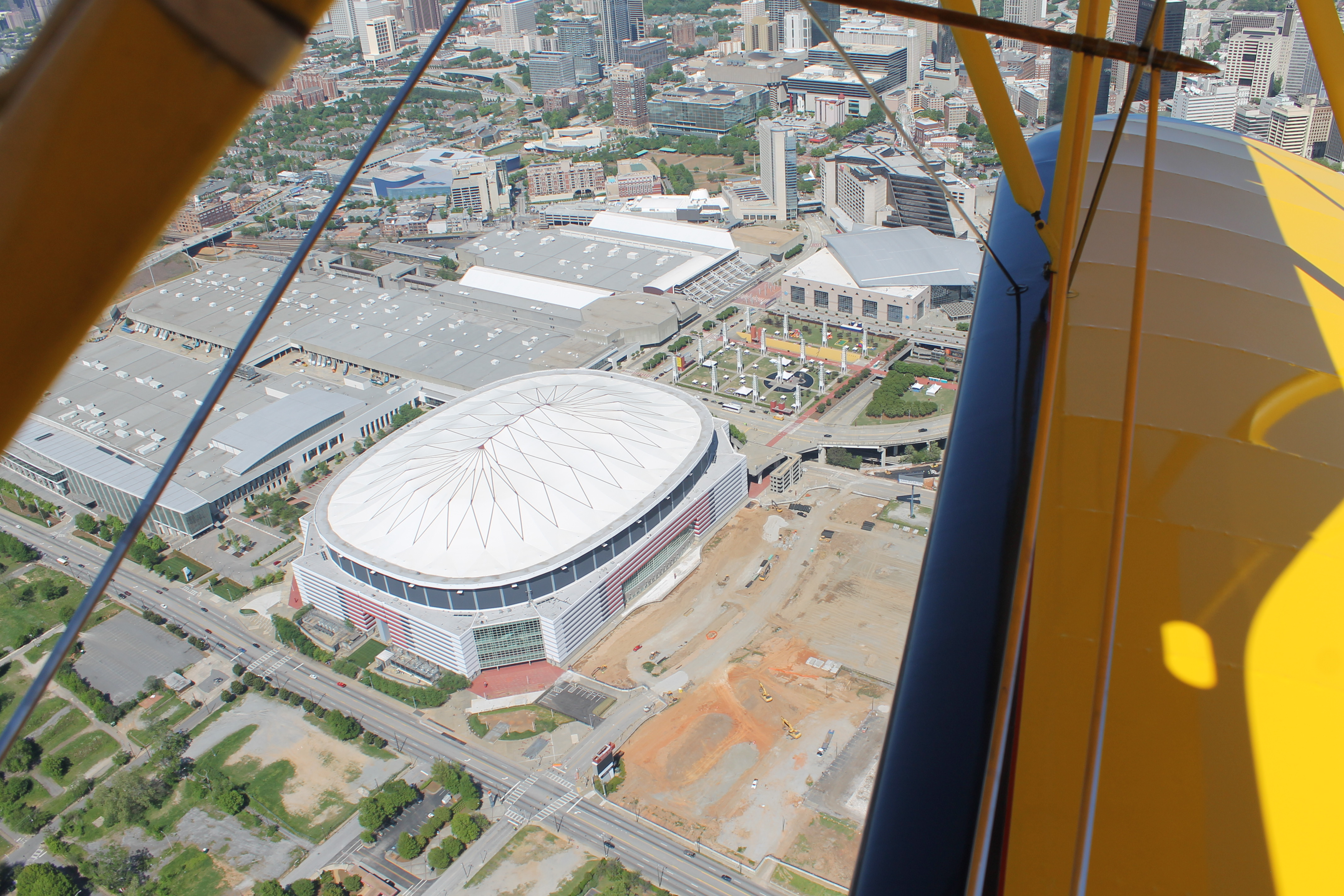
Aerial photo showing land next to Georgia Dome cleared for construction of the new stadium.

On March 7, 2013, the Falcons and the city of Atlanta agreed to build the new downtown stadium. The maximum public contribution for the project was US$200 million, coming from the hotel-motel tax in Atlanta and unincorporated Fulton County. The Atlanta City Council officially approved the stadium on March 19, 2013. The council voted, 11–4, in favor of the use of city hotel-motel taxes to pay US$200 million toward construction costs and potentially several times that toward costs of financing, maintaining and operating the stadium through 2050. On May 21, 2013, the NFL approved a US$200 million loan to the Falcons organization for the purpose of building the stadium.

The Falcons unveiled a conceptual design for the new stadium on June 18, 2013, with a proposed capacity of 70,000 spectators, 7,500 club seats, and 180 luxury suites.

Arthur Blank indicated the groundbreaking of the stadium would be conducted the last week of March 2014. Just after Martin Luther King Jr. Drive was closed permanently, the Mount Vernon Baptist Church held its last Sunday service on March 9 before the historic church was demolished in April. Friendship Baptist, the birthplace of both Spelman College and Morehouse College, was also demolished and relocated to make room for the stadium. Due to legal issues surrounding the issuing of bonds, the stadium did not break ground until May 19, 2014.

Construction site in November 2015.

=== Construction delays, opening ===
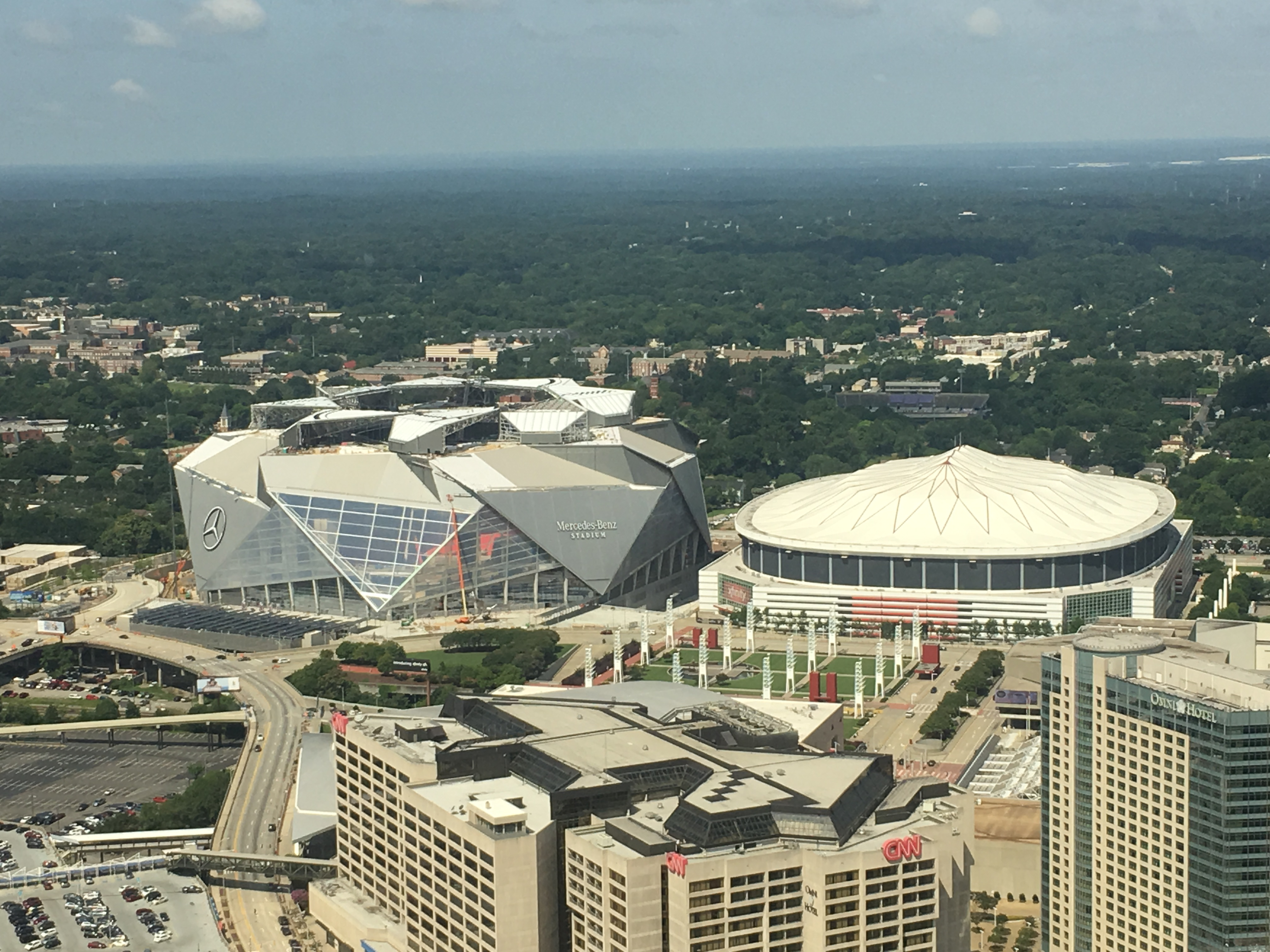
The Georgia Dome (right) and Mercedes-Benz Stadium on July 2, 2017

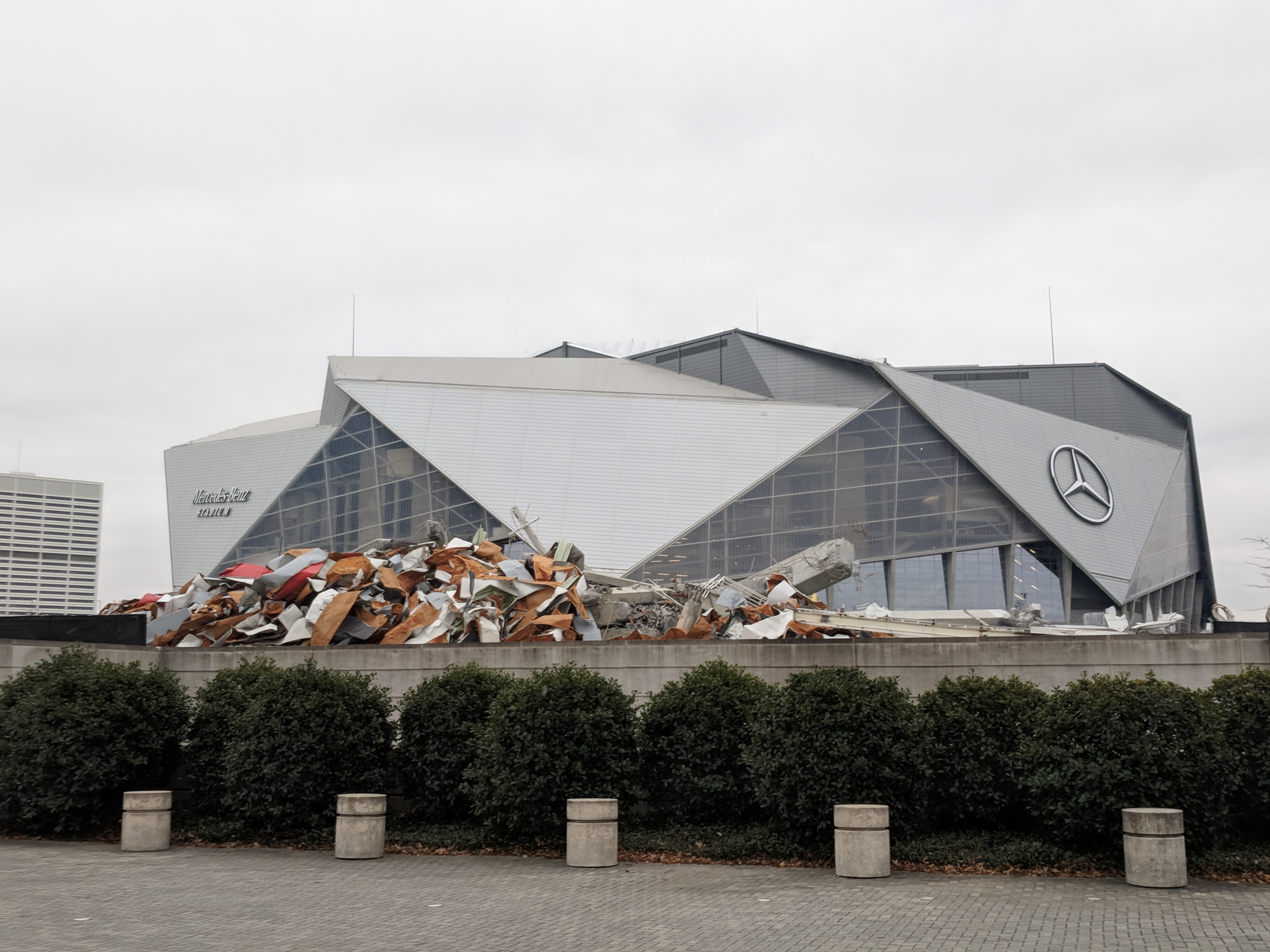
The remains of Georgia Dome with the Mercedes-Benz Stadium in the foreground

The stadium's projected opening date was delayed three times due to the complexity of the eight-panel retractable roof. The stadium was originally intended to open on March 1, 2017; however, the opening date was later delayed to June 1, 2017, then to July 30, 2017, and then to August 26, 2017. Steve Cannon, CEO of the Atlanta Falcons' parent company AMB Group, stated that the Falcons' preseason schedule and the Chick-fil-a Kickoff Games would not be affected by the new opening date; however, three Atlanta United FC matches would be affected. The July 30 game against Orlando City SC was moved to the team's interim home of Bobby Dodd Stadium for July 29 while two home matches scheduled in August were moved to later dates. Additionally, the Georgia Dome's demolition was put on hold until the new stadium's certificate of occupancy could be issued. On June 9, 2017, stadium officials announced that they were confident that Mercedes-Benz Stadium would open as scheduled, and demolition of the Georgia Dome had resumed, and the Dome was imploded on the morning of November 20, 2017.

On July 25, 2017, stadium officials reported that the roof would be in the closed position during the Falcons' preseason games and the Chick-fil-A Kickoff games while contractors continue to fine tune the roof to allow all eight panels to work in sync. Falcons' President Rich McKay also stated that the roof would remain closed whenever outside temperatures exceed 80 °F (27 °C). On August 16, 2017, WXIA reported that construction of the retractable roof system was intentionally delayed by stadium and construction officials to ensure the roof's long term operability and to ensure that other parts of the stadium would be completed on time.

On September 10, 2017, the Falcons announced that, contrary to earlier plans, the stadium roof would in fact be open during the Falcons home opener on September 17 against the Green Bay Packers if weather permitted. On October 6, 2017, stadium officials announced that the roof would be opened, weather permitting, for Atlanta United FC's regular season finale against Toronto FC on October 22; stadium officials also stated that the roof would remain closed for the remainder of the Falcons' regular season as well as for any home matches hosted by Atlanta United FC during the 2017 MLS Cup Playoffs as contractors continued to work on fully mechanizing the roof.

=== Additional construction and renovations ===
Hoping to address concerns of overcrowding at the ingress and egress areas of the stadium, stadium officials announced that they plan to add several more doors to the stadium. Overcrowding and congestion was a frequent concern and complaint from fans attending major events during the stadium's first year of operation. Fans attending the College Football National Championship game reported significant delays in both entering and exiting the stadium, with some reporting wait times that exceeded 45 minutes to get out of the stadium at the completion of the game, most of which was caused because of additional security measures imposed by the US Secret Service due to the President's attendance at the game.

==== Pedestrian bridge ====
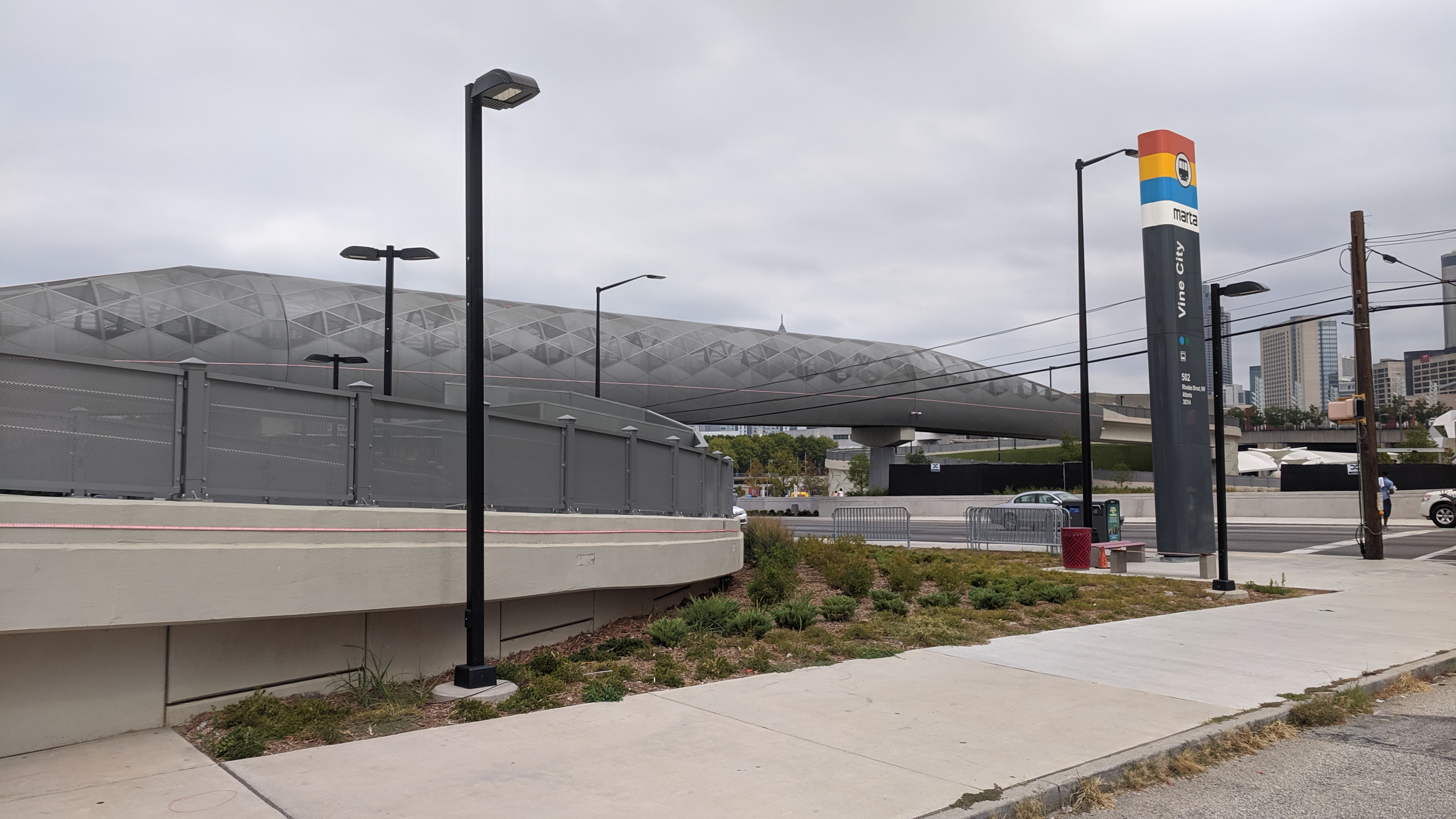
The $33 million pedestrian bridge on the west side of the stadium, spanning over Northside Drive

A pedestrian bridge was planned but not originally opened when the stadium first opened. The bridge was completed in January 2019 at a cost of ~$33 million. It features a serpentine like structure on both ends, and a cover over the main span with customizable LEDs. The bridge connects gameday parking lots and the Vine City MARTA Station to the northwest side of the stadium and The Home Depot Backyard, allowing pedestrians to avoid crossing the busy, 6 lane Northside Drive.

The bridge is criticized for its immense cost, originally only planned to cost $13 million, but swelling to $33 million in part to expedite construction so it would be completed for Super Bowl LIII. However, the bridge was not open for the Super Bowl as it was deemed a security risk. The bridge is also criticized for its inequity and siphoning funds from the 2016 Renew Atlanta TSPLOST; the bridge was not originally on the project lists, so other projects originally on the list had to be removed. Critics argue the original projects would have accomplished more and served more people. It has been also criticized for its lack of accessibility as the ramp is too steep, and there is no elevator.

==== Playing surface ====
On February 7, 2019, stadium officials stated that the artificial turf would be replaced prior to the Falcons' 2019 season as part of nearly $2 million in capital improvements to the stadium; stadium officials also noted that the turf would be replaced approximately every two years given the number of events, both private and public, held annually at Mercedes-Benz Stadium.

For the 2024 Copa América, natural grass sod was placed on top of the stadium's usual artificial turf. Following the first match of the tournament, Argentina's manager Lionel Scaloni criticized the quality of the grass turf.

=== Retractable roof ===
Several reports of the roof leaking during the stadium's inaugural season caused some issues for the stadium's design team. During the College Football National Championship Game in January 2018, several media outlets reported a significant leak that appeared to be occurring just over the field of play near the 25-yard line. Bill Hancock, College Football Playoff Executive Director, said that he and his team had been made aware of the issue concerning water leaking from the roof and that he believed that the issue did not affect the field of play during the game. Neither team competing in the game reported any issues with the playing surface.

Stadium officials clarified after the initial leaks that were reported back in October 2017 that the issue was not a "leak" but rather a "few drops of water" that were falling from the roof around isolated parts of the stadium. Officials stated that the issue was due to the fact that the roof was still not fully mechanized yet, and that the issues would be fixed before the Falcons' 2018 season. They also stated that the issues were common for newly constructed stadiums with retractable roofs.

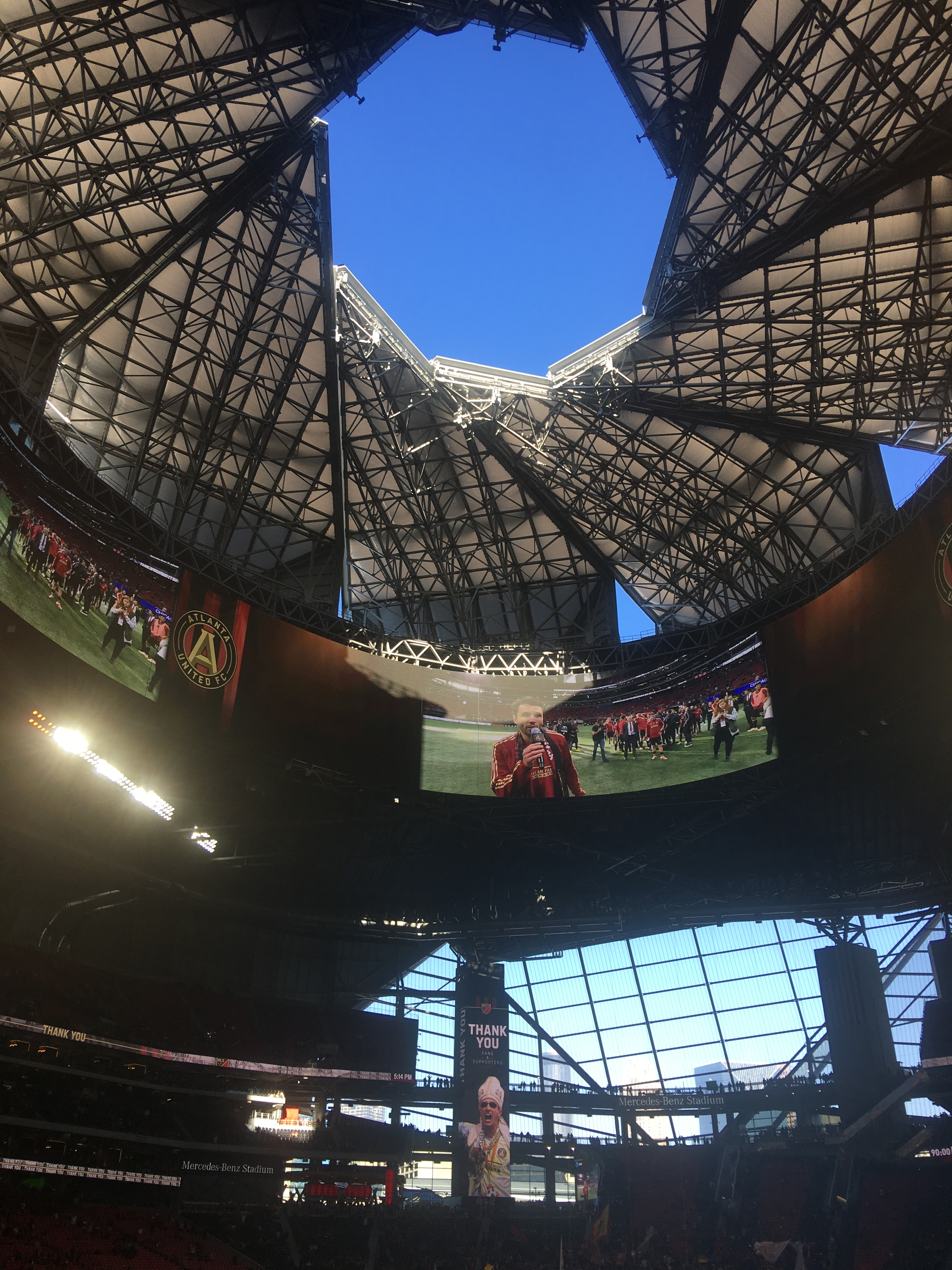
Mercedes-Benz Stadium roof in October 2018

Since the retractable roof was one of the major features and design points of the stadium, some of the problems with the roof were magnified in the stadium's first year of operation. The roof, which is supposed to open in as little as 12 minutes with the push of a button, was not fully operational by the time the stadium's primary tenants, the Atlanta Falcons and the Atlanta United FC, began their regular seasons. The roof was required to be mechanically opened, which was a very time-consuming process. As such, the roof was only opened twice in its first year of use, once for an Atlanta Falcons game – a Sunday Night Football game against the Green Bay Packers on September 17, 2017, and a nationally televised MLS soccer game, when the Atlanta United FC hosted Toronto FC in a sold-out game of more than 70,000 fans on October 22, 2017.

Falcons president Rich McKay told the Atlanta Journal-Constitution that he expected all issues with the roof to be completely resolved before the 2018 season. On May 29, 2018, the roof was opened for the first time since October 2017 for construction purposes. Stadium officials stated that the roof would be open for 10 days, regardless of weather, to complete work on automating the roof. After the 10-day construction period, an unspecified time frame would be required for final commissioning work, after of which, operation of the roof would be turned over to stadium officials. Work on the roof was completed on July 14, 2018. On July 25, 2018, in a demonstration to members of the media, the roof was opened and closed for the first time as intended, with both procedures taking approximately eight minutes each.

== Costs and funding ==
In December 2014, the Georgia World Congress Center's board of governors approved a resolution to raise the cost of the stadium to US$1.2 billion. The stadium was initially slated to cost US$1 billion, then rose to US$1.2 billion in October 2013.

The city has agreed to contribute US$200 million in stadium bonds, but with additional tax revenues and with the state of Georgia contributing US$40 million for parking expansion, public spending is expected to eclipse US$700 million.

In January 2015, the Falcons announced the sale of personal seat licenses (PSL) costing up to US$45,000 per seat, depending on the section of the stadium. The most expensive tickets are priced at US$385 per game, in addition to one-time PSL fees, for the first three years. The total revenue generated from PSL sales was $273 million.

On August 21, 2015, the Atlanta Journal-Constitution reported that Mercedes-Benz, whose American headquarters are in Atlanta, would acquire the naming rights for the stadium, and this was later confirmed by a press conference at the stadium site on August 24. Under the stadium deal with the city of Atlanta and the Georgia World Congress Center Authority, the Falcons organization controls the stadium's naming rights and receives all related revenue. Then-Mercedes-Benz USA CEO Steve Cannon, who would subsequently join the Falcons' organization in 2016 as CEO of AMB Group, stated that the sponsorship would last 27 years, calling it the largest marketing deal in Mercedes-Benz's history, but Cannon would not disclose the full value of the deal; however, Sports Business Daily reported in February 2016 that the naming rights contract was valued at US$324 million. Mercedes-Benz also held a 10-year naming rights contract for the Louisiana Superdome signed in 2011.

Total sponsorship sales for Mercedes-Benz Stadium have reached $900 million.

While the stadium is owned by the state, it is operated by AMB Group, the parent organization of the Falcons and Atlanta United FC. All operating profits of Mercedes-Benz Stadium go to AMB Group and not to the state. In addition, AMB Group does not currently pay any property tax on the stadium.

== Major events ==
=== NFL ===
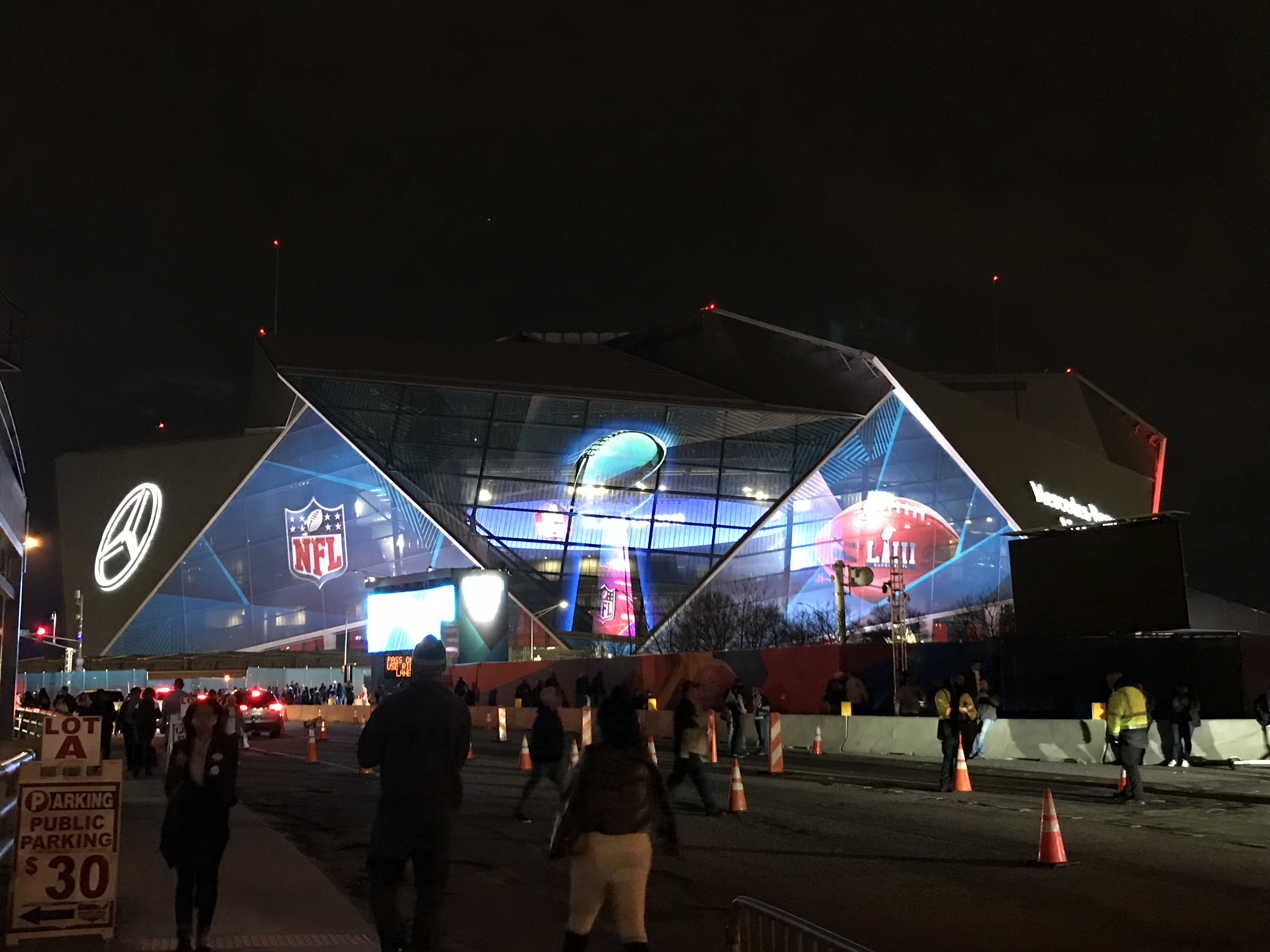
Mercedes-Benz Stadium is decorated for Super Bowl LIII in Atlanta, Georgia

On May 19, 2015, Mercedes-Benz Stadium was awarded Super Bowl LIII in 2019, marking Atlanta's first time hosting the game since Super Bowl XXXIV in 2000.

The stadium would have served as a neutral site for the 2022 AFC Championship on January 29, 2023, if the Buffalo Bills and Kansas City Chiefs both advanced past the divisional round in the NFL playoffs, with the Chiefs serving as the home team as the AFC's top seed. The neutral site placement was arranged because of an unbalanced schedule, due to the Week 17 game between the Bills against the Cincinnati Bengals at Paycor Stadium being cancelled after Bills safety Damar Hamlin went into life-threatening cardiac arrest on the field. The Bengals would win in their Divisional matchup against the Bills (with quarterback Joe Burrow quipping that the Bills and Chiefs 'better send those refunds (back)' after the game in reference to their upset), thus the AFC Championship would be played at Arrowhead Stadium instead.

On October 15, 2024, the NFL announced that the stadium will host Super Bowl LXII in 2028.

=== College basketball ===
The stadium was scheduled to host the 2020 NCAA Final Four. On March 12, 2020, the tournament was completely cancelled outright due to the COVID-19 pandemic, though it would have likely shifted to a smaller Atlanta venue (either the State Farm Arena or the McCamish Pavilion, home of the Final Four's host school, Georgia Tech) in any case, as the tournament was closed to spectators the day before. The NCAA announced on August 20, 2024, that the event was rescheduled to 2031.

=== College and high school football ===
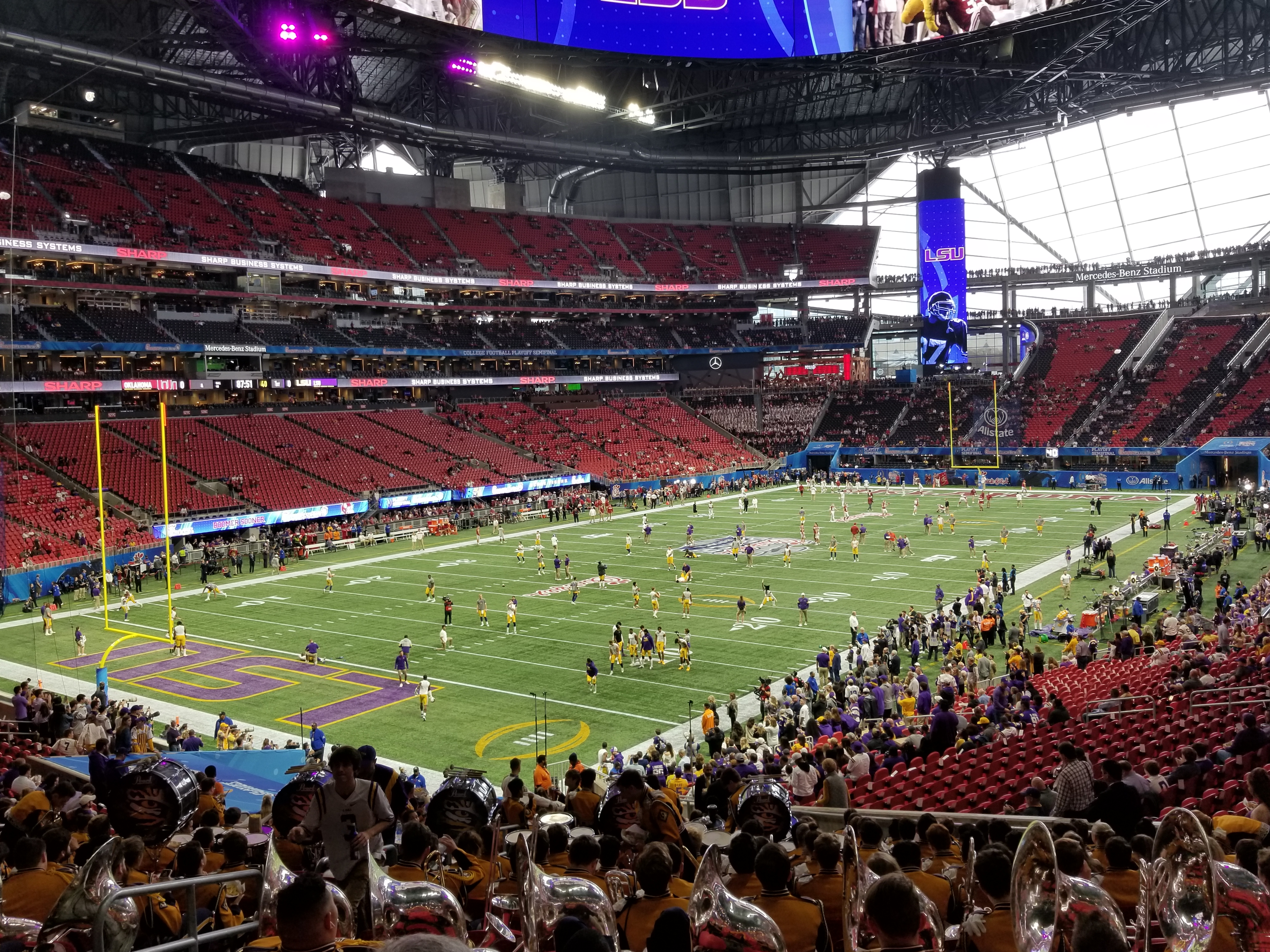
College Football Playoff Semifinal (Oklahoma vs LSU) on December 28, 2019

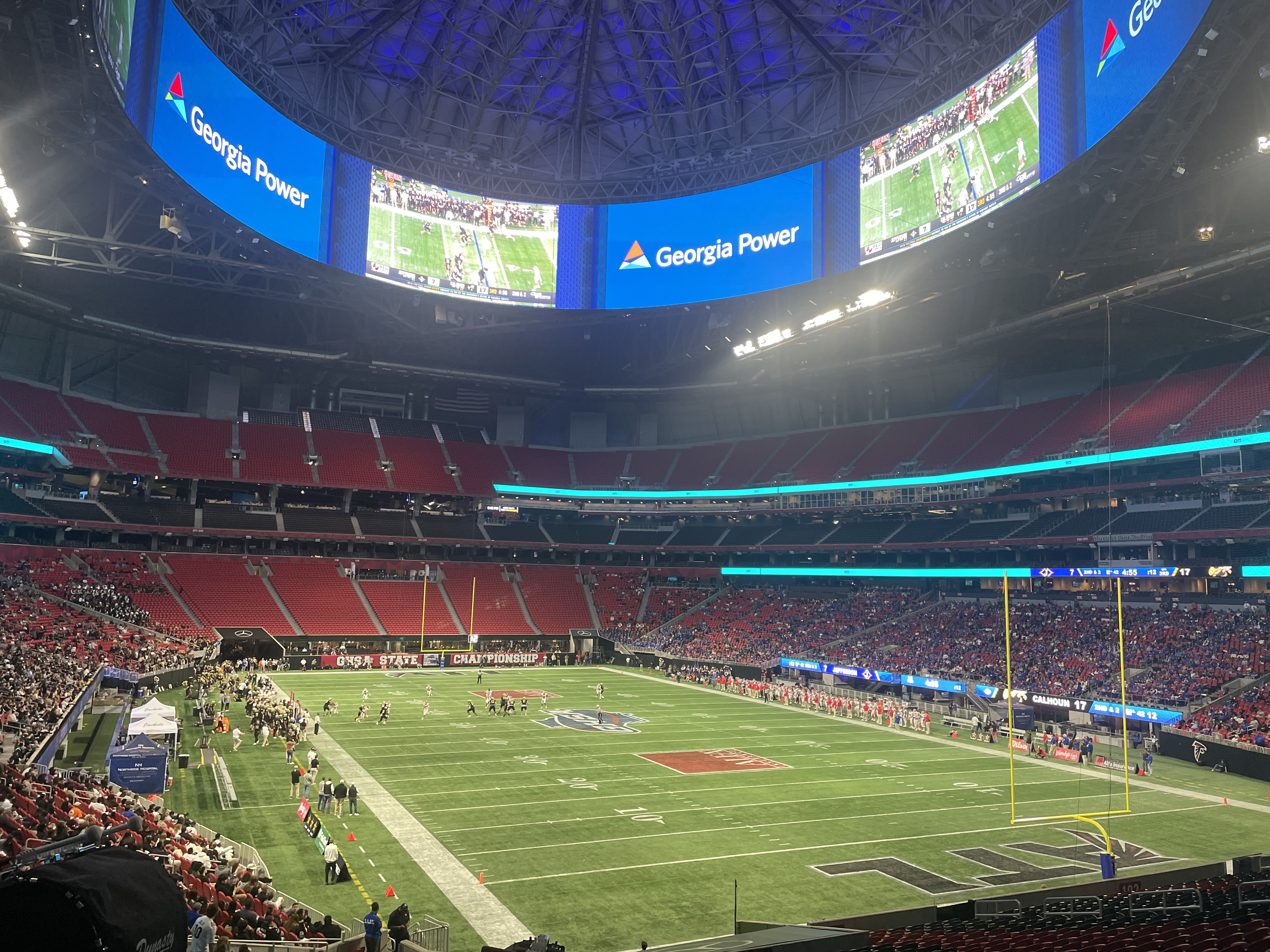
2024 GHSA football championship game

The Peach Bowl, Celebration Bowl, SEC Championship Game, and Chick-fil-A Kickoff Game moved from the Georgia Dome to Mercedes-Benz Stadium in the 2017 season. The SEC Championship has a long-term deal with Mercedes-Benz Stadium through 2027. On February 26, 2019, it was announced that the Georgia Tech Yellow Jackets had agreed to play one home game annually at Mercedes-Benz Stadium from 2021 through 2026.

The 2018 College Football Playoff National Championship was hosted by Atlanta and Mercedes-Benz Stadium. In their first national championship game since 1982, the Georgia Bulldogs were defeated in overtime by the Alabama Crimson Tide. The stadium hosted the national championship again in 2025, where Ohio State defeated Notre Dame.

On December 8, 2017, the stadium hosted the Georgia High School Association (GHSA) football championship games for Class 1A Private School and Class 3A. The remaining two championship games scheduled for that day, Class 5A and Class 6A, as well as the four games originally scheduled for the next day were postponed and relocated to campus sites due to light snow hitting Atlanta and North Georgia that weekend. The 2018 GHSA football championships were held on December 11 and 12 due to Atlanta United FC hosting MLS Cup 2018 on December 8 as well as the 2018 Celebration Bowl scheduled for December 15. In May 2019, the GHSA announced that the football finals would be moved from Mercedes-Benz Stadium to Center Parc Stadium (a redevelopment of Turner Field) starting in 2019, citing the higher costs of renting Mercedes-Benz Stadium compared to the former Georgia Dome. The GHSA Football Championships returned to Mercedes-Benz Stadium in 2023, along with the GHSA Flag Football Championships playing at the stadium for the first time the same year. It will also host the Florida-Georgia football rivalry in 2026 due to renovations of EverBank Stadium.

=== Soccer ===
- On October 22, 2017, Atlanta United FC played an MLS regular season match against Toronto FC at Mercedes-Benz Stadium in front of 71,874 spectators, beating the record they set for the largest crowd in a stand-alone MLS match in September against Orlando City (which also marked the first time the roof was opened for a soccer game). Atlanta United FC also set the single-season record for attendance.
- On March 11, 2018, Atlanta United FC played an MLS regular season match against D.C. United at Mercedes-Benz Stadium in front of 72,035 spectators, setting the record for the largest crowd in MLS history.
- On October 23, 2017, it was announced that the 2018 MLS All-Star Game would take place at Mercedes-Benz Stadium against Italian club Juventus. It was held on August 1, 2018, and set a new record for attendance at an MLS All-Star game, with 72,317 spectators.
- On December 8, 2018, Atlanta United FC hosted the Portland Timbers in the MLS Cup final after they earned home field advantage by virtue of their regular season record over Portland. Atlanta defeated Portland 2–0, winning their first-ever MLS championship, and the city's first major sports championship in over 20 years. The game set a single-game attendance record for Major League Soccer, with 73,019 spectators.
- On August 14, 2019, Atlanta United hosted Club América in the 2019 Campeones Cup. Atlanta defeated América 3–2, winning their first-ever Campeones Cup in front of 40,128 supporters. This attendance set an attendance record for Campeones Cup.

| Date | Winning team | Result | Losing team | Tournament | Attendance |
|---|---|---|---|---|---|
| October 22, 2017 | (United States) Atlanta United FC | 2–2 | (Canada) Toronto FC | 2017 Major League Soccer season | 71,874 |
| March 11, 2018 | (United States) Atlanta United FC | 3–1 | (United States) D.C. United | 2018 Major League Soccer season | 72,035 |
| August 1, 2018 | (Italy) Juventus | 1–1 (5–3 pen.) | (United States) (Canada) MLS All-Stars | 2018 MLS All-Star Game | 72,317 |
| December 8, 2018 | (United States) Atlanta United FC | 2–0 | (United States) Portland Timbers | 2018 MLS Cup | 73,019 |
| June 5, 2019 | Mexico | 3–1 | Venezuela | International Friendly | 51,834 |
| August 14, 2019 | (United States) Atlanta United FC | 3–2 | (Mexico) Club América | 2019 Campeones Cup | 40,128 |
| August 27, 2019 | (United States) Atlanta United FC | 2–1 | (United States) Minnesota United FC | 2019 U.S. Open Cup Final | 35,709 |
| June 12, 2021 | Mexico | 0–0 | Honduras | International Friendly | 70,072 |
| August 31, 2022 | Paraguay | 1–0 | Mexico | International Friendly | 51,387 |
| July 26, 2023 | (England) Brighton & Hove Albion | 2–0 | (England) Brentford | 2023 Premier League Summer Series | 70,789 |
| July 26, 2023 | (England) Chelsea | 1–1 | (England) Newcastle United | 2023 Premier League Summer Series | 70,789 |
| September 12, 2023 | Mexico | 3–3 | Uzbekistan | International Friendly | 33,817 |
| April 6, 2024 | United States | 2–1 | Japan | 2024 SheBelieves Cup | 50,644 |
| April 6, 2024 | Canada | 1–1 (4–2 pen.) | Brazil | 2024 SheBelieves Cup | 50,644 |
| July 31, 2024 | (England) Chelsea | 3–0 | (Mexico) Club América | Club Friendly | 38,000 |
| August 3, 2025 | (England) West Ham United | 2–0 | (England) Bournemouth | 2025 Premier League Summer Series | |
| August 3, 2025 | (England) Manchester United | 2–2 | (England) Everton | 2025 Premier League Summer Series | |
| March 28, 2026 | Belgium | 5–2 | United States | International Friendly | 66,867 |
| March 31, 2026 | Portugal | 2–0 | United States | International Friendly | 72,297 |

==== 2024 Copa América ====
The stadium hosted two matches during the 2024 Copa América, including the opening match of the tournament.

| Date | Winning team | Result | Losing team | Round | Attendance |
|---|---|---|---|---|---|
| June 20, 2024 | Argentina | 2–0 | Canada | Group A | 70,564 |
| June 27, 2024 | Panama | 2–1 | United States | Group C | 59,145 |

==== 2025 FIFA Club World Cup ====
The stadium hosted six matches for the 2025 FIFA Club World Cup.

| Date | Time (UTC−4) | Team #1 | Res. | Team #2 | Round | Attendance |
|---|---|---|---|---|---|---|
| June 16, 2025 | 15:00 | Chelsea (England) | 2–0 | (United States) Los Angeles FC | Group D | 22,137 |
| June 19, 2025 | 15:00 | Inter Miami CF (United States) | 2–1 | (Portugal) Porto | Group A | 31,783 |
| June 22, 2025 | 19:00 | Manchester City (England) | 6–0 | (United Arab Emirates) Al Ain | Group G | 40,392 |
| June 29, 2025 | 12:00 | Paris Saint-Germain (France) | 4–0 | (United States) Inter Miami CF | Round of 16 | 65,574 |
| July 1, 2025 | 21:00 | Borussia Dortmund (Germany) | 2–1 | (Mexico) Monterrey | Round of 16 | 31,442 |
| July 5, 2025 | 12:00 | Paris Saint-Germain (France) | 2–0 | (Germany) Bayern Munich | Quarter-finals | 66,937 |

==== 2026 FIFA World Cup ====
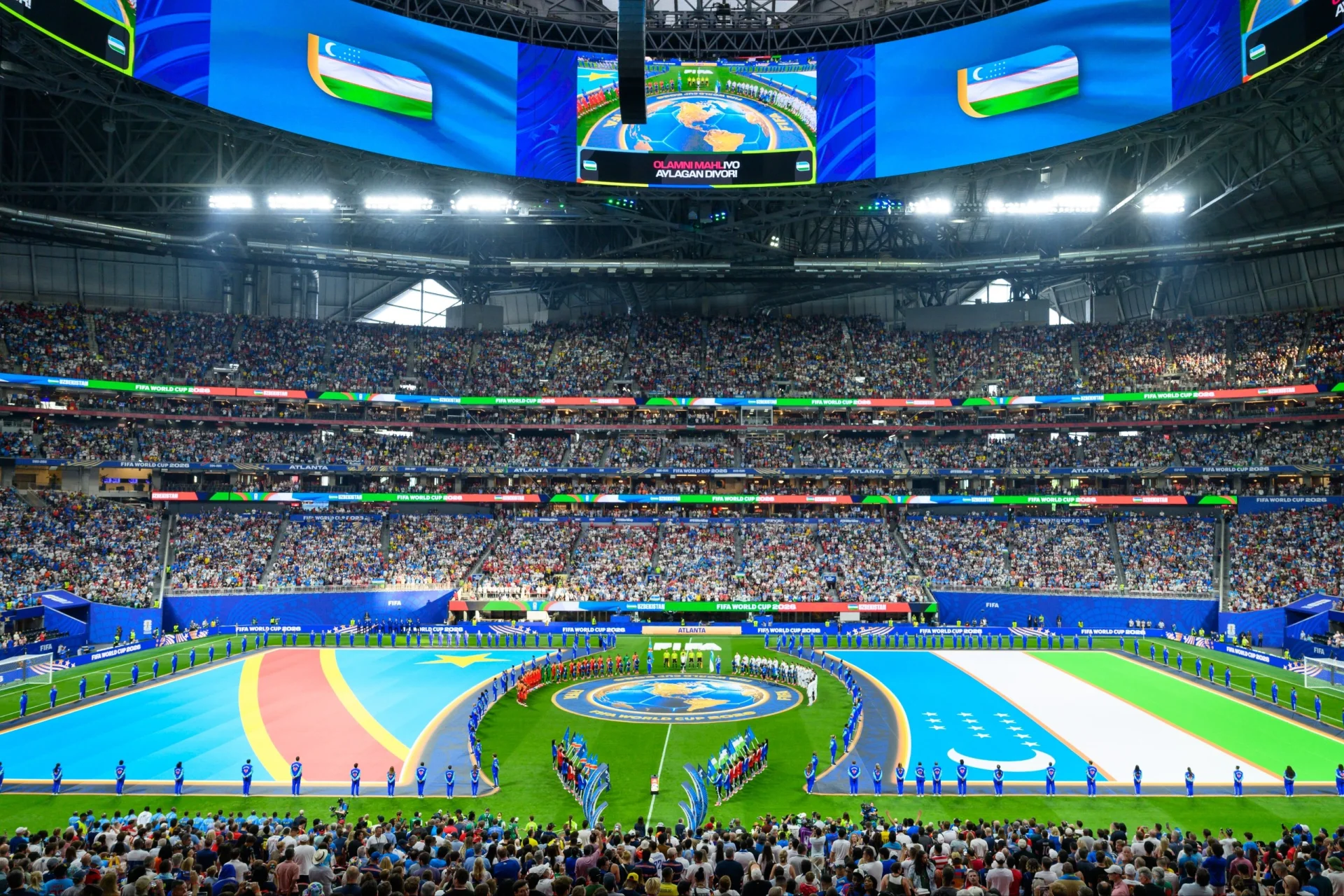
Inside Mercedes-Benz Stadium prior to a match between DR Congo and Uzbekistan at the 2026 FIFA World Cup.

Mercedes-Benz Stadium hosted several matches during the 2026 FIFA World Cup, making it one of the eleven American venues as well as one of five MLS venues to host matches. During the event, the stadium was temporarily renamed to "Atlanta Stadium" in accordance with FIFA's policy on corporate sponsored names. The stadium hosted eight matches: five group stage matches, one Round of 32 match, one Round of 16 match, and one semifinal match.

===== List of matches =====
| Date | Time (UTC−4) | Team #1 | Res. | Team #2 | Round | Attendance |
|---|---|---|---|---|---|---|
| June 15, 2026 | 12:00 | Spain | 0–0 | Cape Verde | Group H | 67,640 |
| June 18, 2026 | 12:00 | Czech Republic | 1–1 | South Africa | Group A | 67,442 |
| June 21, 2026 | 12:00 | Spain | 4–0 | Saudi Arabia | Group H | 68,239 |
| June 24, 2026 | 18:00 | Morocco | 4–2 | Haiti | Group C | 68,239 |
| June 27, 2026 | 19:30 | DR Congo | 3–1 | Uzbekistan | Group K | 68,239 |
| July 1, 2026 | 12:00 | England | 2–1 | DR Congo | Round of 32 | 68,239 |
| July 7, 2026 | 12:00 | Argentina | 3–2 | Egypt | Round of 16 | 68,239 |
| July 15, 2026 | 15:00 | England | 1–2 | Argentina | Semi-final | 68,239 |

=== 2031 and 2033 Rugby World Cups ===
Atlanta is among the cities being considered for hosting matches during the 2031 Men's Rugby World Cup and 2033 Women's Rugby World Cup.

=== Concerts ===
The stadium often accommodates major music events.

| Date | Artist | Opening act(s) | Tour / Concert name | Attendance | Revenue | Notes |
|---|---|---|---|---|---|---|
| October 12, 2017 | Garth Brooks | Mitch Rossell; Karyn Rochelle | World Tour (Garth Brooks) | N/A | N/A | First concert at the stadium. |
| May 26, 2018 | Kenny Chesney | Thomas Rhett; Old Dominion; Brandon Lay | Trip Around The Sun Tour Tour | 51,312 / 51,312 | $5,068,880 | |
| August 10, 2018 | Taylor Swift | Camila Cabello; Charli XCX | Taylor Swift's Reputation Stadium Tour | 116,746 / 116,746 | $18,089,415 | First music act to headline two shows on a single tour at the stadium. |
| August 11, 2018 | Taylor Swift | Camila Cabello; Charli XCX | Taylor Swift's Reputation Stadium Tour | 116,746 / 116,746 | $18,089,415 | First music act to headline two shows on a single tour at the stadium. |
| August 25, 2018 | Beyoncé; Jay-Z | Chloe x Halle; DJ Khaled | On the Run II Tour | 105,170 / 105,170 | $14,074,692 | |
| August 26, 2018 | Beyoncé; Jay-Z | Chloe x Halle; DJ Khaled | On the Run II Tour | 105,170 / 105,170 | $14,074,692 | |
| November 9, 2018 | Ed Sheeran | Snow Patrol; Lauv | ÷ Tour | 50,906 / 50,906 | $5,021,395 | |
| March 30, 2019 | George Strait | Chris Stapleton; Chris Janson; Ashley McBryde | N/A | 55,255 / 55,255 | $11,999,961 | |
| November 6, 2021 | Metallica | N/A | 2021–2022 Tour | N/A | N/A | |
| November 11, 2021 | The Rolling Stones | Zac Brown Band | No Filter Tour | 49,915 / 49,915 | $11,125,641 | |
| May 21, 2022 | Kenny Chesney | Dan + Shay; Old Dominion; Carly Pearce | Here and Now Tour | 47,925 / 47,925 | $4,902,829 | |
| June 11, 2022 | Coldplay | H.E.R. | Music of the Spheres World Tour | 54,059 / 54,059 | $5,913,613 | |
| July 30, 2022 | Luke Combs | Cody Johnson; Zach Bryan; Morgan Wade | N/A | N/A | N/A | |
| August 11, 2022 | The Weeknd | Snoh Aalegra; Mike Dean | After Hours til Dawn Stadium Tour | 46,836 / 46,836 | $6,539,838 | |
| September 22, 2022 | Elton John | N/A | Farewell Yellow Brick Road Tour | 47,156 / 47,156 | $7,843,802 | |
| April 28, 2023 | Taylor Swift | Beabadoobee; Gracie Abrams | The Eras Tour | | | |
| April 29, 2023 | Taylor Swift | Beabadoobee; Gracie Abrams | The Eras Tour | | | |
| April 30, 2023 | Taylor Swift | Muna; Gayle | The Eras Tour | | | |
| May 27, 2023 | Ed Sheeran | Khalid; Dylan | +–=÷× Tour | 76,335 | N/A | First concert performed in-the-round |
| August 11, 2023 | Beyoncé | – | Renaissance World Tour | 156,317 / 156,317 | $39,849,890 | Highest-grossing boxscore report in the stadium's history. |
| August 12, 2023 | Beyoncé | – | Renaissance World Tour | 156,317 / 156,317 | $39,849,890 | Highest-grossing boxscore report in the stadium's history. |
| August 14, 2023 | Beyoncé | – | Renaissance World Tour | 156,317 / 156,317 | $39,849,890 | Highest-grossing boxscore report in the stadium's history. |
| September 21, 2023 | Karol G | Agudelo; Young Miko | Mañana Será Bonito Tour | | | |
| May 18, 2024 | Kenny Chesney; Zac Brown Band | Megan Moroney; Uncle Kracker | Sun Goes Down 2024 Tour | | | |
| June 7, 2024 | The Rolling Stones | Ghost Hounds | Hackney Diamonds Tour | | | |
| April 29, 2025 | Kendrick Lamar; SZA | Mustard | Grand National Tour | | | |
| May 11, 2025 | Post Malone; Jelly Roll | Sierra Ferrell | Big Ass Stadium Tour | | | |
| June 3, 2025 | Metallica | Pantera; Suicidal Tendencies | M72 World Tour | | | |
| July 10, 2025 | Beyoncé | | Cowboy Carter Tour | 205,909 / 205,909 | $55,424,228 | First music act to headline four shows on a single tour at the stadium. Highest-grossing artist in the stadium's history. |
| July 11, 2025 | Beyoncé | | Cowboy Carter Tour | 205,909 / 205,909 | $55,424,228 | First music act to headline four shows on a single tour at the stadium. Highest-grossing artist in the stadium's history. |
| July 13, 2025 | Beyoncé | | Cowboy Carter Tour | 205,909 / 205,909 | $55,424,228 | First music act to headline four shows on a single tour at the stadium. Highest-grossing artist in the stadium's history. |
| July 14, 2025 | Beyoncé | | Cowboy Carter Tour | 205,909 / 205,909 | $55,424,228 | First music act to headline four shows on a single tour at the stadium. Highest-grossing artist in the stadium's history. |
| August 21, 2025 | The Weeknd | Playboi Carti; Mike Dean | After Hours til Dawn Tour | | | |
| August 21, 2026 | Chris Stapleton | Lainey Wilson Ashley McBryde | | | | |
| August 27, 2026 | AC/DC | The Pretty Reckless | Power Up Tour | | | |
| September 24, 2026 | Karol G | | Viajando Por El Mundo Tropitour | | | |
| October 3, 2026 | Ed Sheeran | Lukas Graham; Aaron Rowe | Loop Tour | | | Macklemore was removed as an opening act as Mercedes-Benz Stadium and other venues would not allow him to perform. |
| November 7, 2026 | Usher; Chris Brown | | The R&B Tour | | | |
| November 8, 2026 | Usher; Chris Brown | | The R&B Tour | | | |
| November 10, 2026 | Usher; Chris Brown | | The R&B Tour | | | |
| May 29, 2027 | Zach Bryan | John Fogerty; Fey Fili | Young Manhood and Other Donatable Organs Tour | | | |
| June 8, 2027 | Stray Kids | | Run It World Tour | | | |

=== Other major events ===
- On March 3, 2018, the stadium hosted a round of the AMA Supercross Championship, replacing the Georgia Dome which had been part of the schedule since 1993.
- On July 28, 2018, and July 27, 2019, the stadium hosted the Drum Corps International Southeastern Championship which was previously held in the Georgia Dome. On November 17, 2021, DCI announced that the Southeastern Championship would not return to the stadium for the 2022 tour, instead opting for Center Parc Stadium due to scheduling conflicts.
- On December 31, 2019 – January 2, 2020, Mercedes-Benz Stadium hosted its first ever Passion Conferences. The event made history by becoming the largest youth-centered Christian conference ever held in the United States with over 50,000 students in attendance. It is higher than Passion's 2017 event in the Georgia Dome, which held an estimated 40,000 people. Mercedes-Benz Stadium hosted its third Passion Conference from January 3–5, 2024.

== In popular culture ==
On January 4, 2018, the stadium was the subject of the premiere episode of Building Giants on Science Channel. Using footage of the construction along with CGI, the building process is explored in detail. It was noted during the episode that the heaviest truss sections were erected by the largest conventional crawler crane ever built in North America, a Manitowoc Model 31000 which is rated at a capacity of 2,535 US tons (2,300 metric tons).

A train horn blares every time the Atlanta Falcons or Atlanta United teams score or win – a nod to Atlanta's railroad history.

During the rollout for Kanye West's 2021 album Donda, the stadium hosted two listening parties for the album, with West living inside the stadium and working on the album for two weeks, paying $1 million per day.

Major League Wiffle Ball hosted their 2023 World Series at the stadium, a year after hosting their 2022 World Series at SoFi Stadium. Unlike 2022, MLW played the series with fans in attendance, marking the first time MLW has played a World Series with fans in attendance.

== See also ==
- Truist Park
- Lists of stadiums

Events and tenants
| Preceded by Georgia Dome | Home of the Atlanta Falcons; 2017–present | Succeeded by Current |
| Preceded by Bobby Dodd Stadium | Home of Atlanta United FC; 2017–present | Succeeded by Current |
| Preceded by Raymond James Stadium | Home of the College Football Playoff National Championship; 2018 | Succeeded by Levi's Stadium |
| Preceded by Georgia Dome | Home of the Chick-Fil-A Peach Bowl; 2017–present | Succeeded by Current |
| Preceded by Georgia Dome | Home of the SEC Championship Game; 2017–present | Succeeded by Current |
| Preceded by U.S. Bank Stadium; SoFi Stadium | Host of the Super Bowl; LIII 2019; LXII 2028 | Succeeded by Hard Rock Stadium; TBD |
| Preceded by AT&T Stadium | NCAA Men's Division I Basketball Tournament; Finals Venue; 2031 | Succeeded by TBD |
