= Wiffle Ball (video game) =

2009 video game

- The prototype box art of Wiffle Ball, showing its title as Wiffle Ball Advance
- Developer: Skyworks Technologies
- Publishers: NA: Destination Software Inc.; EU: Zoo Digital Publishing
- Director: Bill Wentworth
- Producer: Garry Kitchen
- Artists: Adam Hayes; Julie Chase
- Composer: Chris Kelly
- Platform: Nintendo DS
- Release: WW: March 12, 2009
- Genre: Sports
- Modes: Single-player, multiplayer

Wiffle Ball is a 2009 Wiffle ball sports game developed by Skyworks Technologies and published by Destination Software Inc. in the United States. The game was also released in Europe, where it was published by Zoo Digital Publishing. Released on March 12, 2009, Wiffle Ball received "generally unfavorable" reviews from critics, who stated that "every step of [the game's] execution [was] a failure".

== Gameplay ==
The gameplay of Wiffle Ball is highly similar to the sport with the same name. The game is divided into two main modes: Quick-Play and Tournament. The Quick-Play mode was designed to be played for short amounts of time, while the Tournament mode is meant to be played for longer. The game also features a wireless multiplayer mode, where two players compete in a game of Wiffle ball.

== Development and release ==
Wiffle Ball was developed by Skyworks Technologies and was published by Destination Software Inc. in North America, and by Zoo Digital Publishing in Europe. The game was referred to as Wiffle Ball Advance prior to its release. The game was directed by Bill Wentworth, produced by Garry Kitchen, and composed by Chris Kelly.

Wiffle Ball was first announced by Nintendo in 2006, with a slated release date of Q1 2007. The game later released worldwide on March 12, 2009.

== Reception ==
Reception

Aggregate score
Aggregator	Score
Metacritic	22/100

Review scores
Publication	Score
AllGame	2.5/5
GameZone	5.6/10
IGN	1.5/10
NGamer	1.2/10
Nintendojo	3/10

Wiffle Ball received "generally unfavorable" reviews from critics according to review aggregator Metacritic. Critics were negative towards how the game requires players to use the Nintendo DS stylus, which some deemed as unnecessary. GameZone's Louis Bedigian felt that the use of the stylus complicated the game's gameplay.

GameZone was positive towards the idea of making a video game based on the Wiffle ball sports, but felt that Wiffle Ball "missed the mark". The game's audio and soundtrack received mixed reception from critics; GameZone called it "bad", while Nintendojo was more positive to it, calling the song used during gameplay "relaxing".
