= Master of Labour Welfare =

Master of Labour Welfare is a Master's degree in the subject of Labour Welfare offered by some Indian Universities.
