= Major League Wiffle Ball =

North American wiffle ball league

- Sport: Wiffle ball
- Founded: Major League Wiffle Ball (MLW), 2009; 17 years ago
- First season: 2010
- Commissioner: Kyle Schultz, Patrick Baalman (Assistant)
- No. of teams: 8
- Countries: United States (8 teams)
- Headquarters: Brighton, Michigan
- Most recent champions: Metro Magic (2nd title)
- Most titles: Western Wildcats (6 titles)
- Website: mlwwiffleball.com

Major League Wiffle Ball (MLW) is a semi-professional wiffle ball league based in Brighton, Michigan consisting of eight permanent teams. The league was founded in 2009 and mainly operates a channel on YouTube, but can also be seen on other platforms such as Instagram, ESPN, and MLB Network.

The Western Wildcats are the most successful team in Major League Wiffle Ball with six championships. The Metro Magic are the most recent champions after beating the Coastal Corbas in 4 games to win their second overall championship in their team history.

== History ==
The league was founded in 2009 in Brighton, Michigan by brothers Kyle, Brendan, and Daniel Schultz and their neighbors Tommy and Rachel Coughlin. They played their games originally at the front lawn of the Schultz family house, known as "Cultz Field". The league now plays most games at "The Meadows" at the Huron Clinton Metropark in Brighton, Michigan.

The league first ventured into playing at locations outside of Brighton beginning with the 2021 Oklahoma Series at the Shangri-La Resort in Afton, Oklahoma. Starting from 2022, MLW began playing their World Series games at neutral sites, when the Downtown Diamondbacks and Coastal Cobras played at SoFi Stadium in Los Angeles, though that event was without fans. They have also hosted special games in Ohio, Vermont, California, Pennsylvania, Georgia, and New York. The 2026 MLW World Series was held at Lindsey Nelson Stadium in Knoxville, Tennessee, the home of the University of Tennessee Volunteers baseball team.

== Teams ==
Team	Manager
Coastal Cobras	Caden Irwin
Downtown Diamondbacks	Jimmy Knorp
Eastern Eagles	Daniel Schultz
Great Lakes Gators	Chris Cheetam
Metro Magic	RJ Walgate
Midwest Mallards	Tommy Coughlin III
Pacific Predators	Ryan Kracht Alec Warda
Western Wildcats	Kyle Schultz

== Media coverage ==
Major League Wiffle Ball primarily cover games on the league's YouTube channel, which as of October 2026 has around 660,000 subscribers. MLW also owns accounts on other platforms such as Instagram and TikTok. The league has also been featured on ESPN Sports Center and MLB Network.
